= Fossane =

Fossane may refer to:

- fossa, (the animal)
- Fossane, a locality in Sogn og Fjordane, Norway
