= Bioparc Valencia =

Zoo in Valencia, Spain

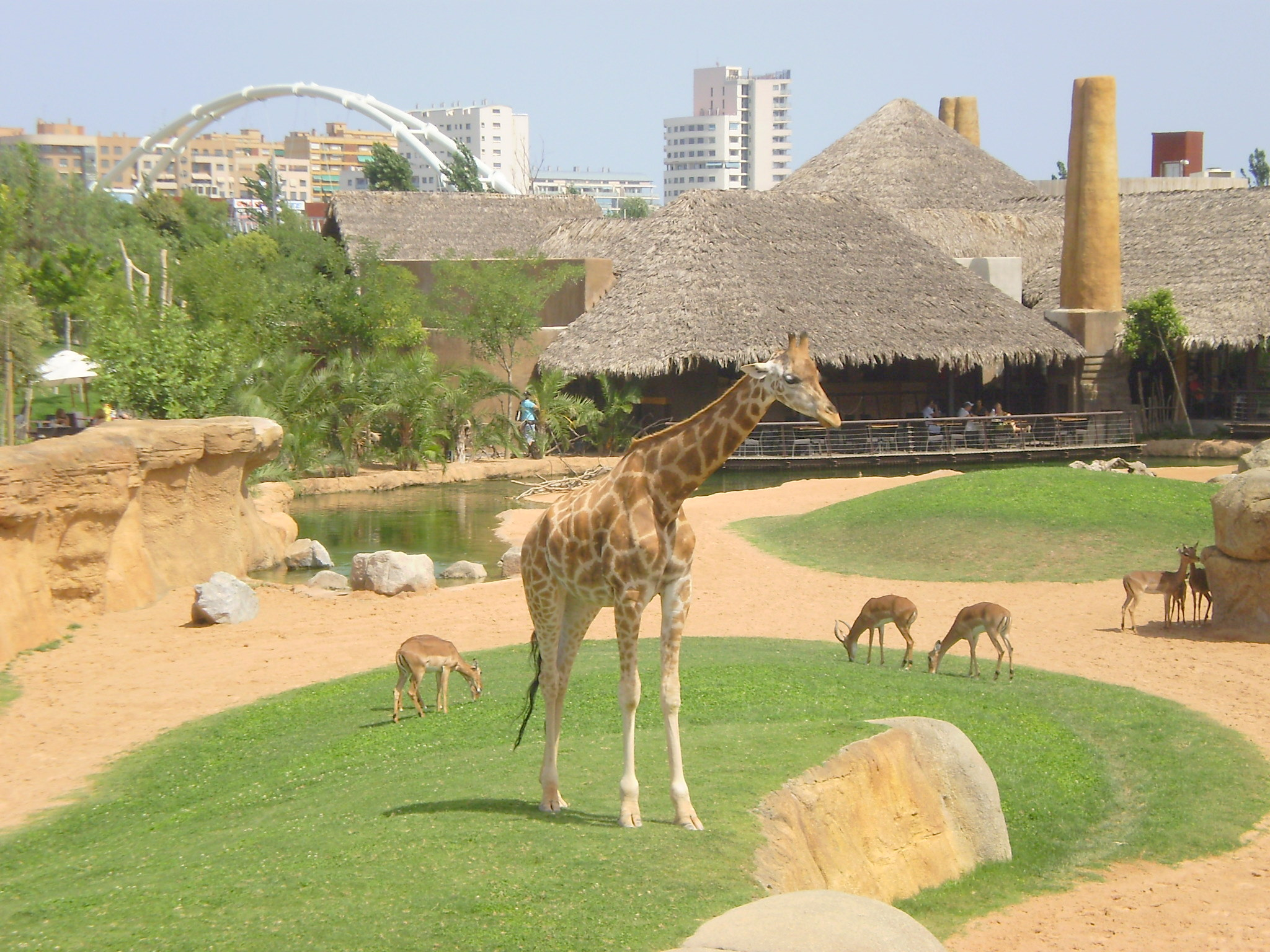
- Interactive map of Bioparc Valencia
- 39.478°N 0.407°W
- Date opened: 2008
- Location: Valencia, Spain
- Land area: 10 ha (25 acres)
- No. of animals: 4,000
- No. of species: 200
- Annual visitors: 1.5 million
- Website: www.bioparcvalencia.es

Bioparc Valencia is a 10-hectare (25-acre) zoo park in Valencia, Spain. The zoo is owned by the City Council of Valencia and designed and managed by Rainforest (a private Spanish company devoted to building and managing zoos). It has a large collection of African fauna.

Most of the animals moved to the new Bioparc facilities, located in Valencia's Turia riverbed, from the old city's zoo when the park opened in 2008.

The concept of the zoo, called Zooimersion in Spanish, consists of immersing visitors into the animals' habitat and not vice versa. This is achieved by not using the traditional railings and cages that are common in many zoos, using instead rivers, ponds, streams and rocks to separate visitors from the animals. Also, great care has been taken in reproducing the eco-systems, including an important collection of African flora.

The zoo is the birthplace of Makena, the first elephant born in the Valencian Community.

== Exhibits ==
As of 2022:

Sabana

- Aardvark
- Abdim's stork
- African bush elephant
- African pygmy mouse
- African rock python
- African sacred ibis
- Ball python
- Banded mongoose
- Blesbok
- Bush stone-curlew
- Cairo spiny mouse
- Cape porcupine
- Cape teal
- Common dwarf mongoose
- Common ostrich
- Common warthog
- Crested guineafowl
- Gambian pouched rat
- Golden-breasted starling
- Grant's zebra
- Grey crowned crane
- Impala
- Kirk's dik-dik
- Klipspringer
- Lion
- Marabou stork
- Meerkat
- Mhorr gazelle
- Naked mole-rat
- Purple starling
- Rock hyrax
- Rothschild's giraffe
- Saddle-billed stork
- Southern white rhinoceros
- Speckled pigeon
- Spotted hyena
- Superb starling
- Thomson's gazelle
- Waterbuck
- White-cheeked turaco

Selva Ecuatorial

- African black duck
- African forest buffalo
- Black crowned crane
- Chimpanzee
- De Brazza's monkey
- Drill
- Dumeril's boa
- Dwarf crocodile
- Eastern bongo
- Emperor scorpion
- Gabon talapoin
- Leopard
- Leopard tortoise
- Madagascar day gecko
- Madagascar hissing cockroach
- Panther chameleon
- Pygmy hippopotamus
- Red forest duiker
- Red river hog
- Sitatunga
- Spotted-necked otter
- Western lowland gorilla
- White-naped mangabey

Humedales

- African spoonbill
- Golden mantella
- Hippopotamus
- Nile crocodile
- Pink-backed pelican

Madagascar

- Black-and-white ruffed lemur
- Fossa
- Great white pelican
- Greater flamingo
- Mongoose lemur
- Red-bellied lemur
- Red-fronted lemur
- Red ruffed lemur
- Ring-tailed lemur

== Gallery ==
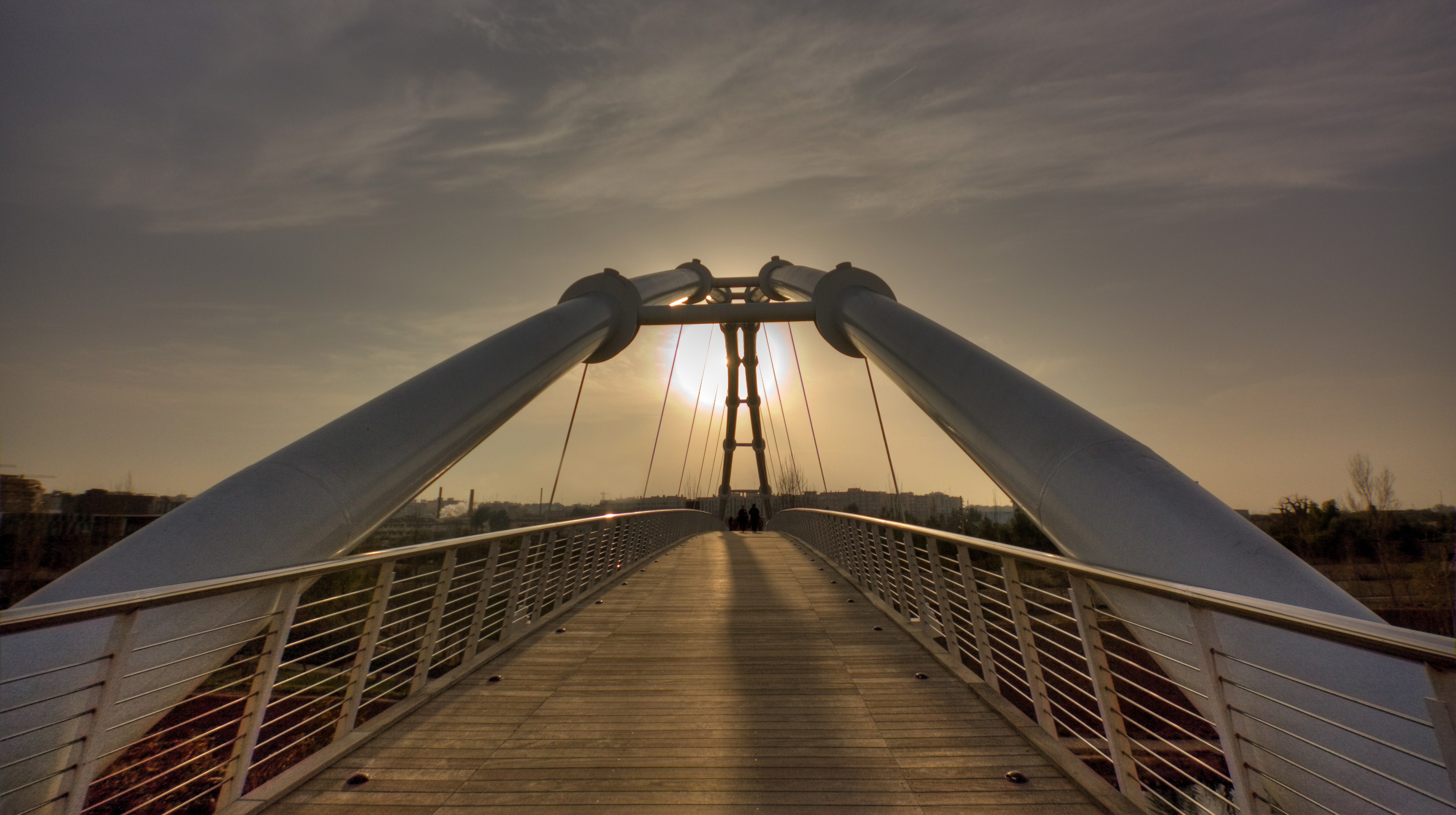
Bridge entrance.

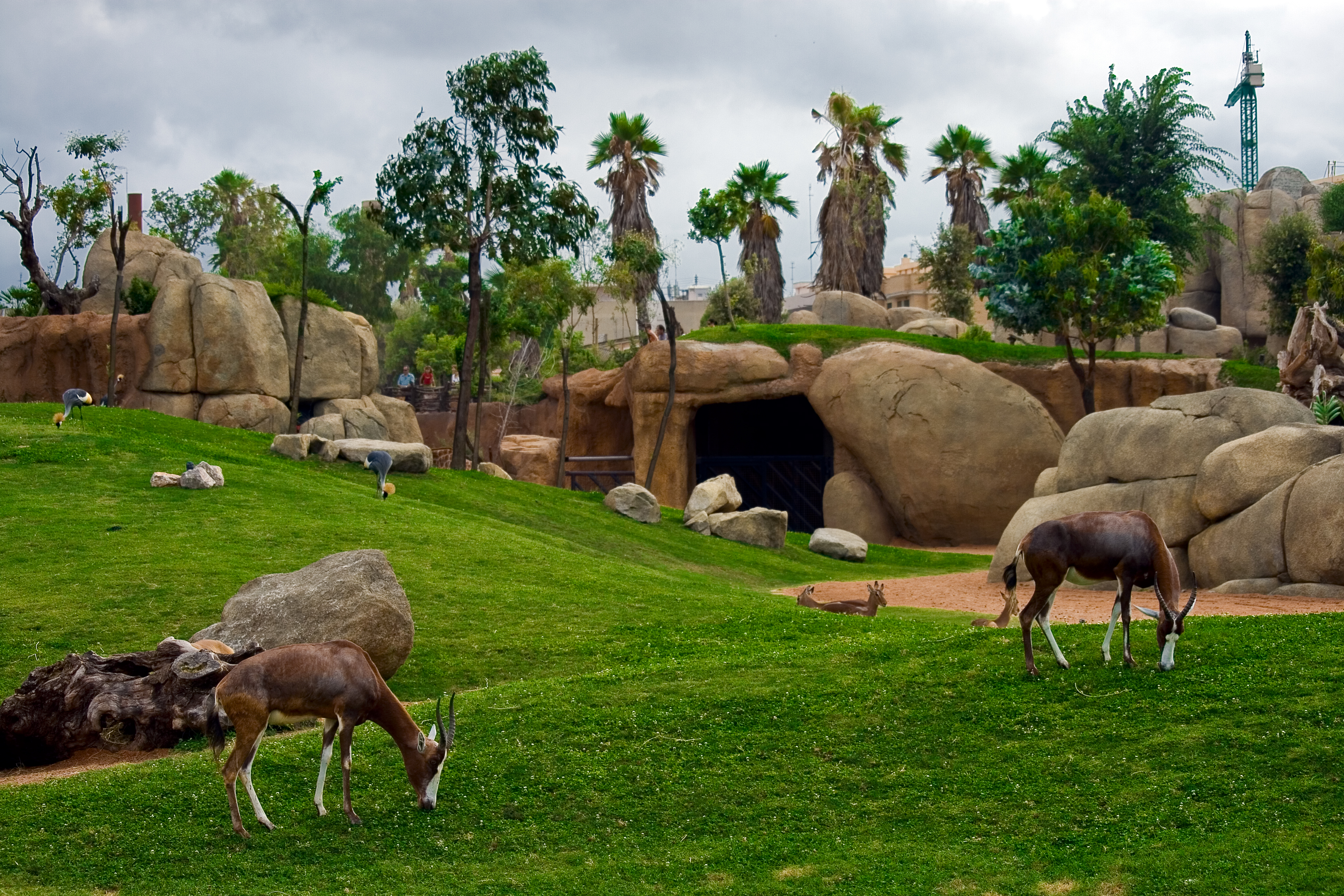
Natural settings for the habitats.

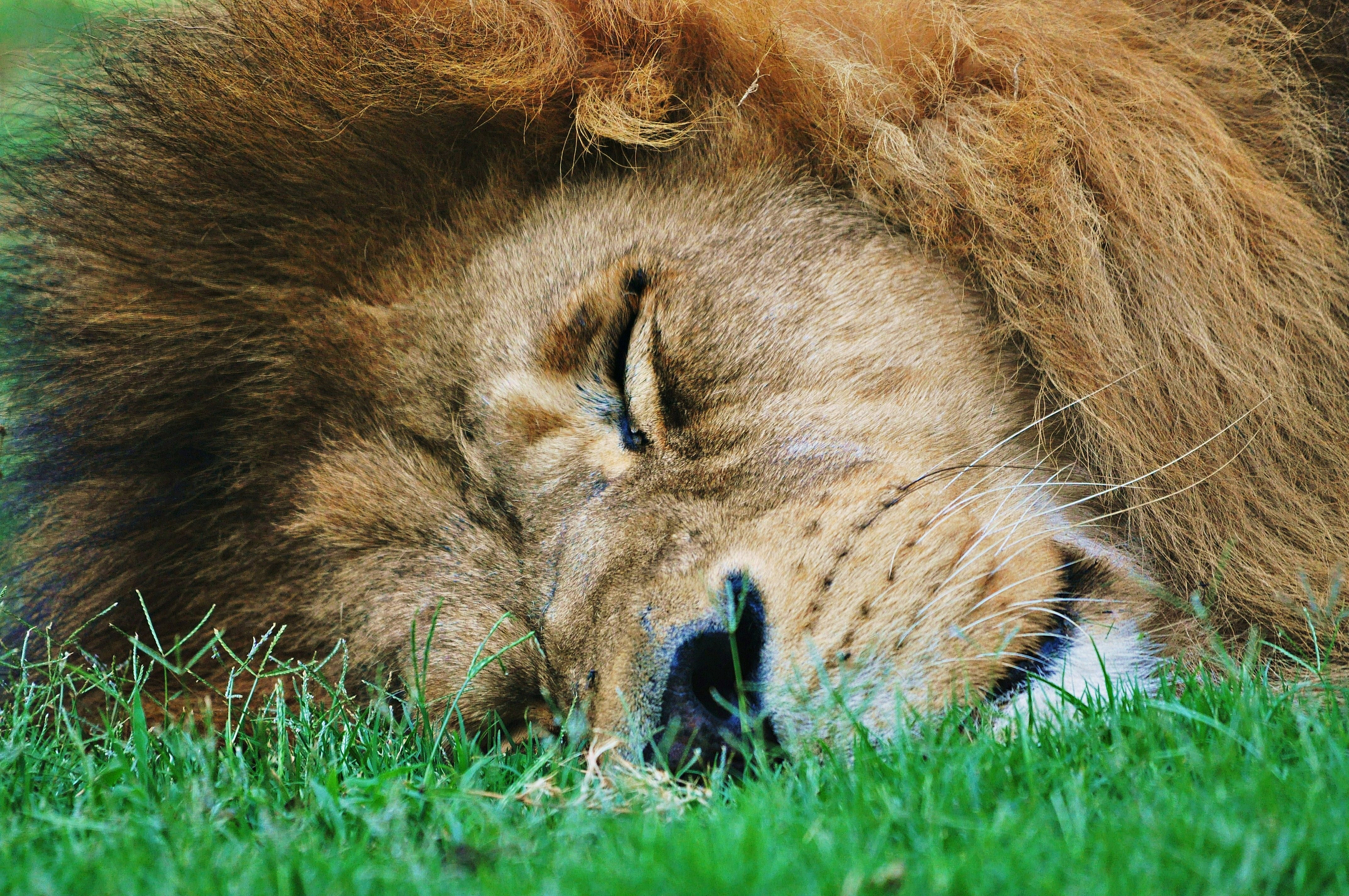
A lion resting.

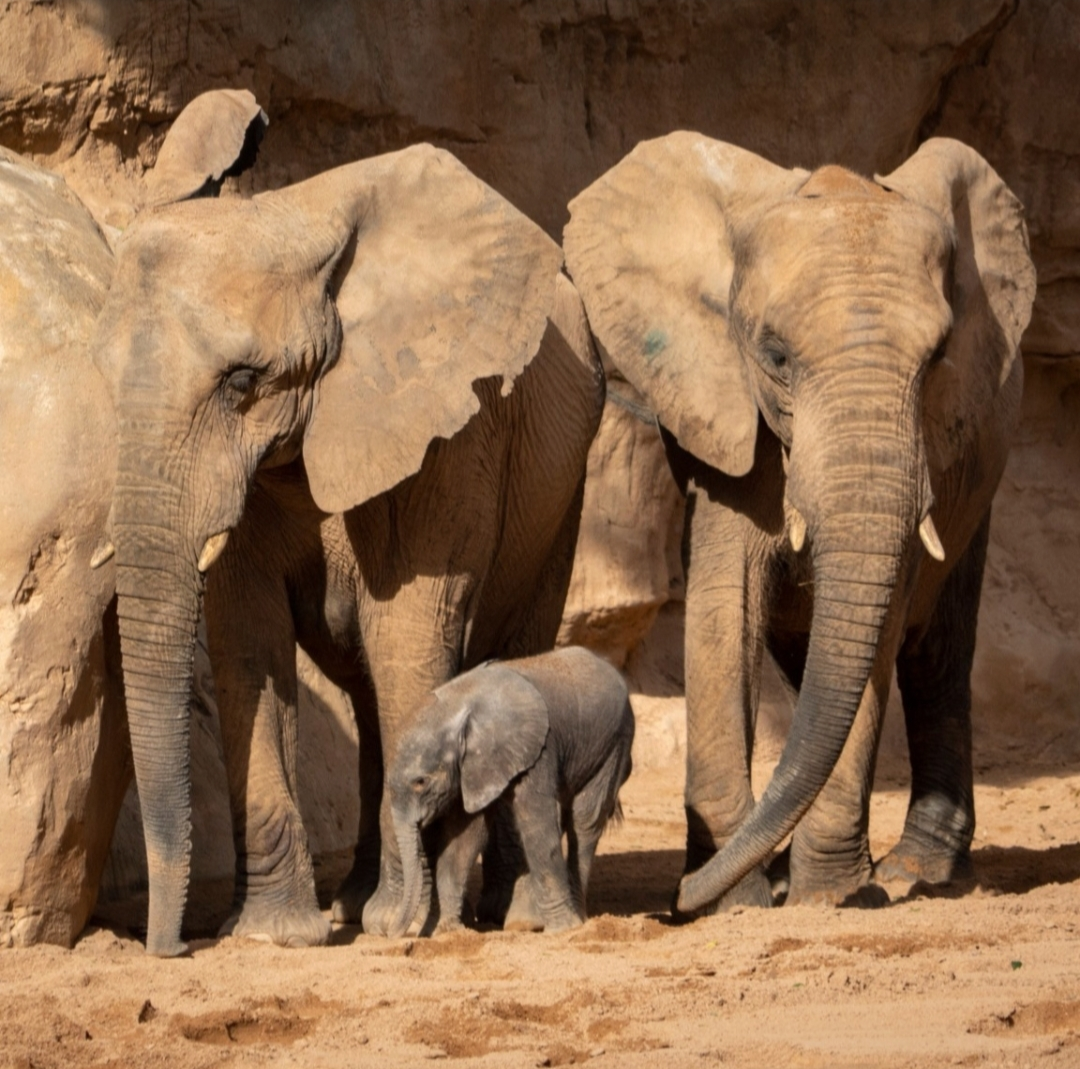
Elephants with a baby.

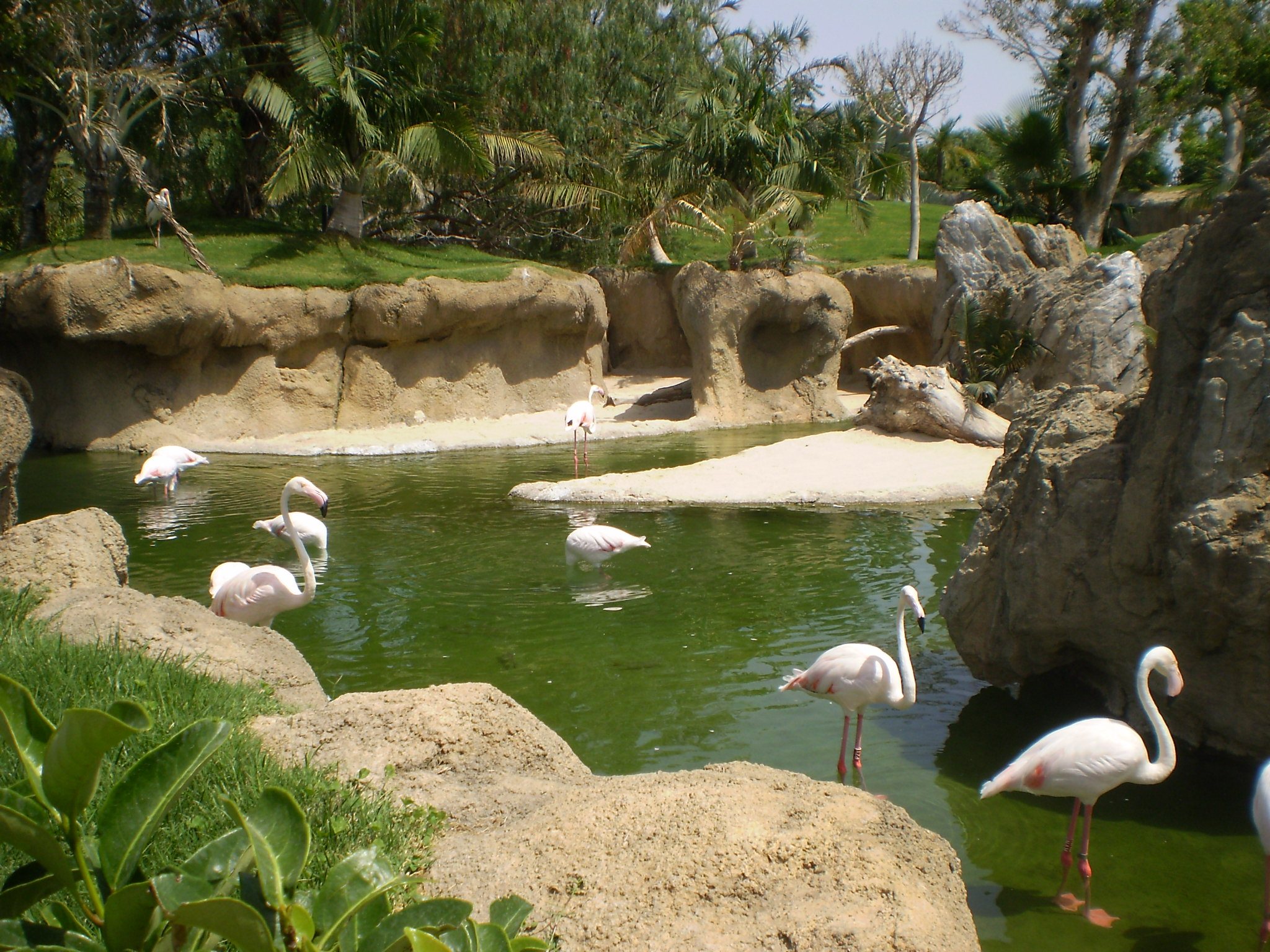
Flamingos habitat.

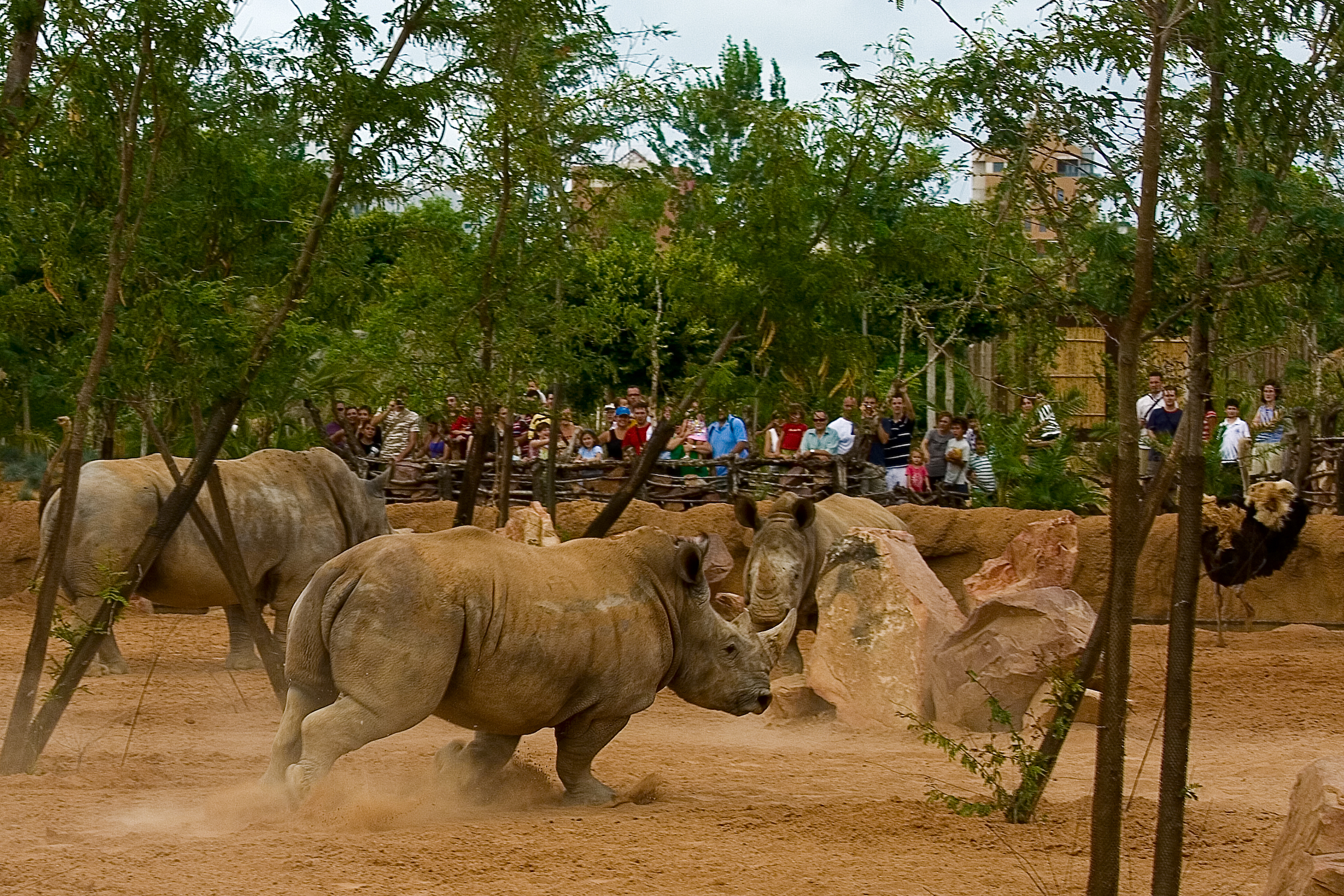
Rhinoceros running.

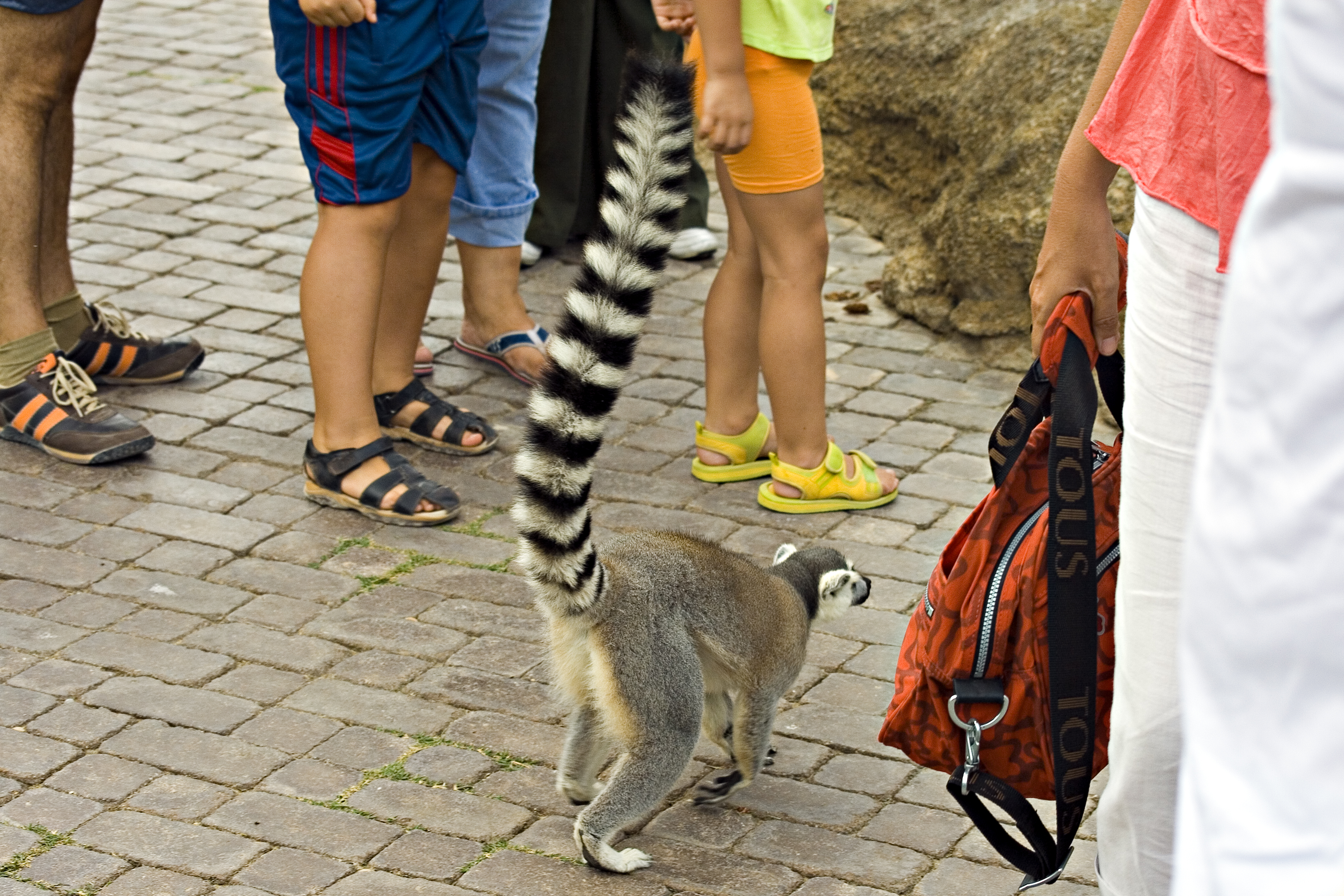
Lemur in public.

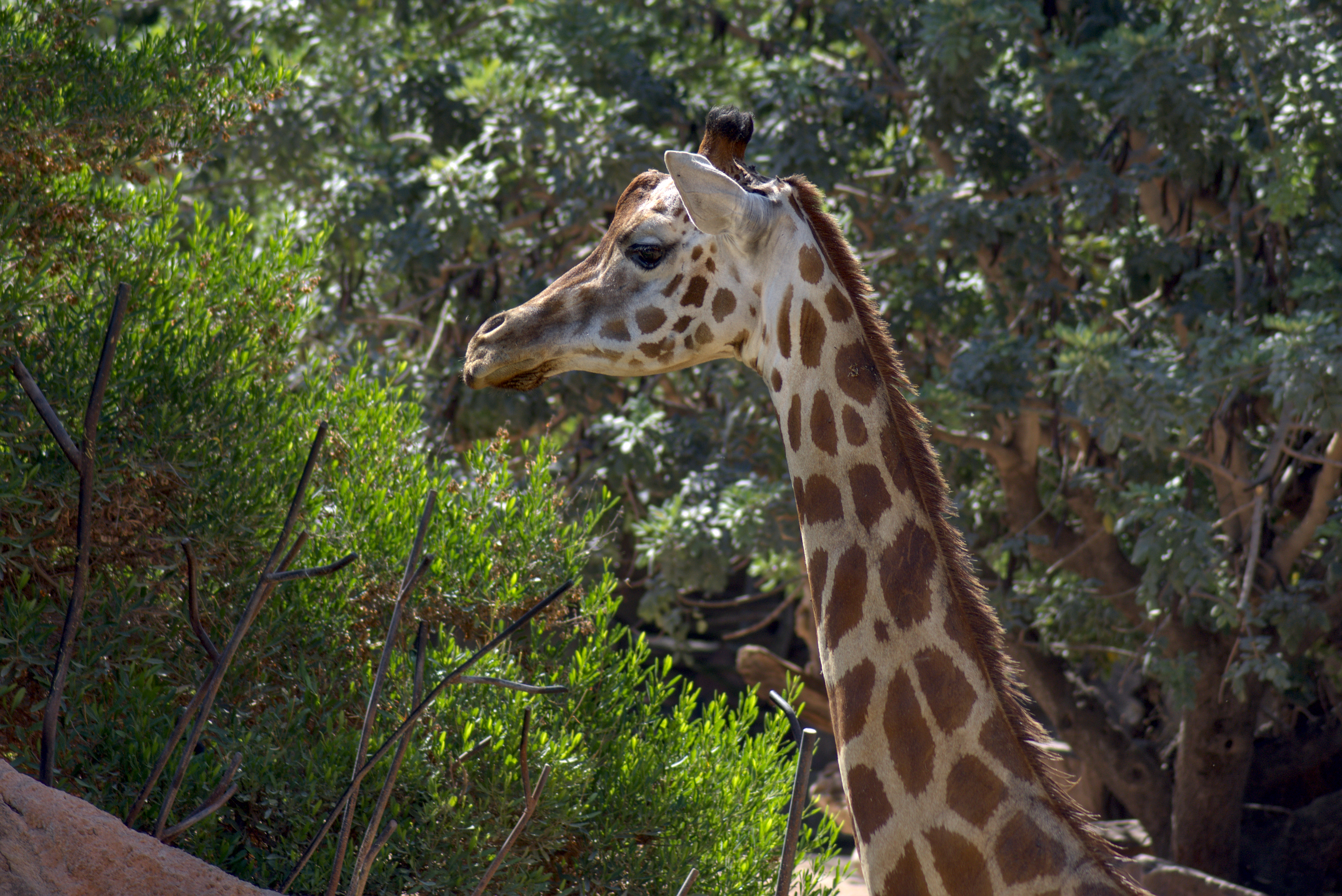
Rothschild Giraffe.

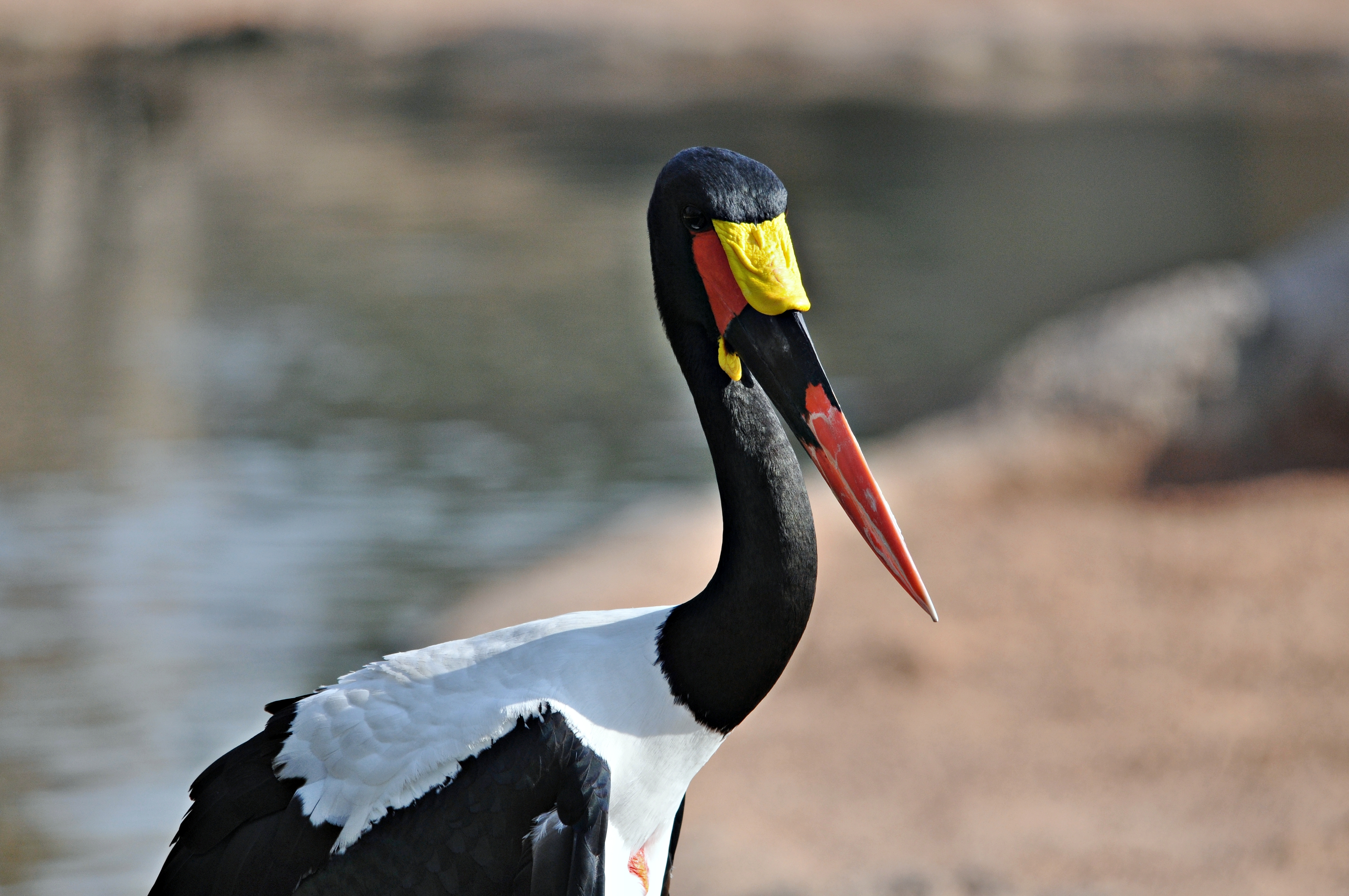
Saddle-billed stork (Ephippiorhynchus senegalensis).

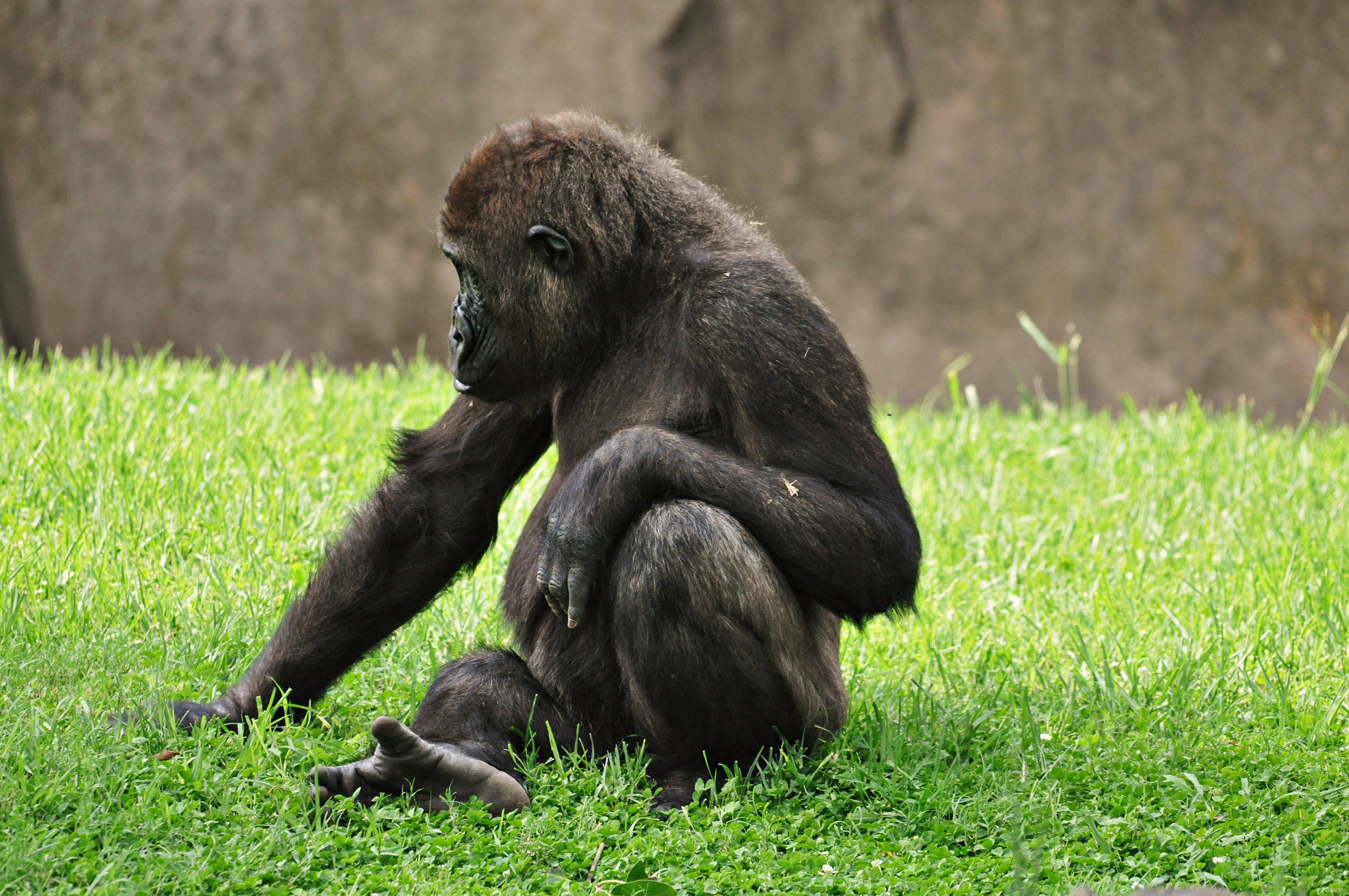
Gorilla
