= Makena (elephant) =

First elephant born in the Valencian Community (born 2022)

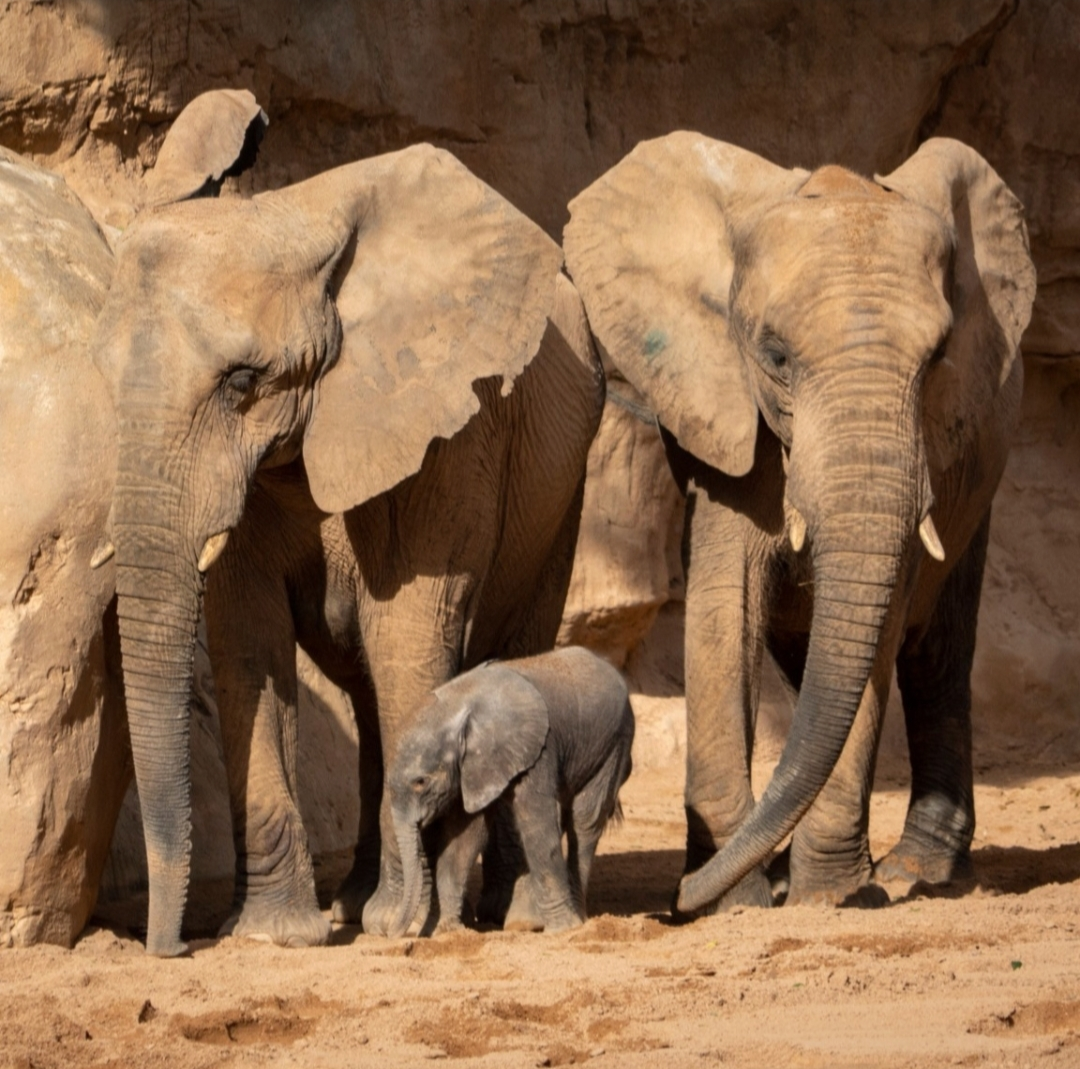
- Species: Loxodonta africana
- Sex: female
- Born: November 9, 2022 (age 3); Valencia, Spain

Makena (born November 9, 2022) is an African elephant born at Bioparc Valencia in Valencia, Spain. It is the first elephant born in the Valencian Community.

The elephant was born on day 653 of pregnancy, after 21 1/2 months of gestation; the mother, Matla, had been inseminated in January 2021 by a team of German technicians with semen from a wild male. This operation was carried out as part of the European Program for the Conservation of the African Elephant, after the previous year the International Union for Conservation of Nature listed this species as endangered. On November 9, 2022, between 1:00 and 1:30 Matla started having contractions and at 4:20 she gave birth. The birth occurred naturally without complications and with great anticipation from the zoo team.

On the 28th of the same month, a vote was opened to choose her name, the winning option was Makena, which means "the one who is happy" in the Kikuyu language.
