= Étienne de Flacourt =

French governor of Madagascar

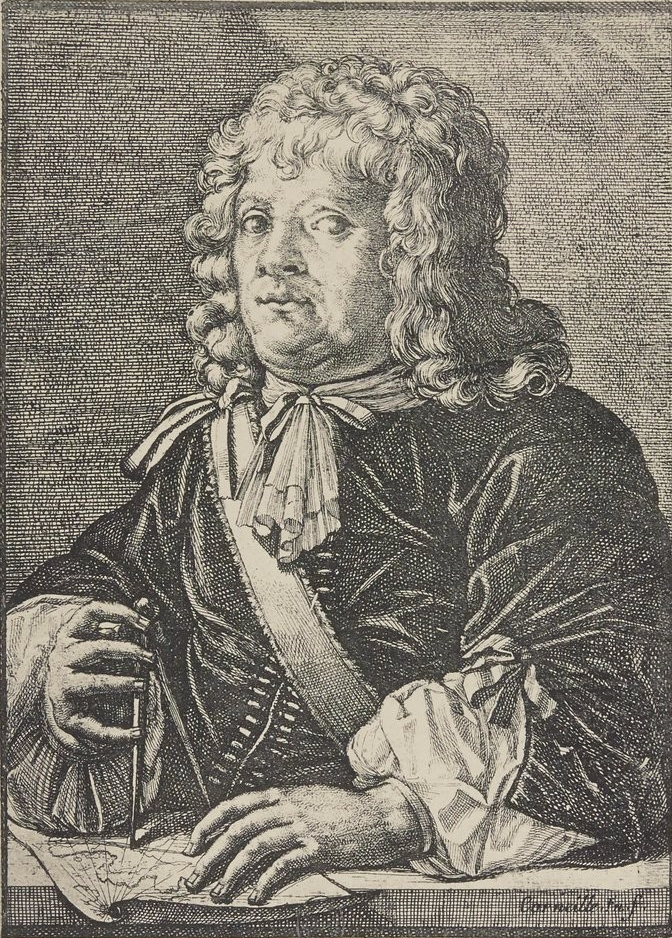
Étienne de Flacourt

Étienne de Flacourt (1607–1660) was a French governor of Madagascar, born in Orléans in 1607. He was named governor of Madagascar by the French East India Company in 1648.

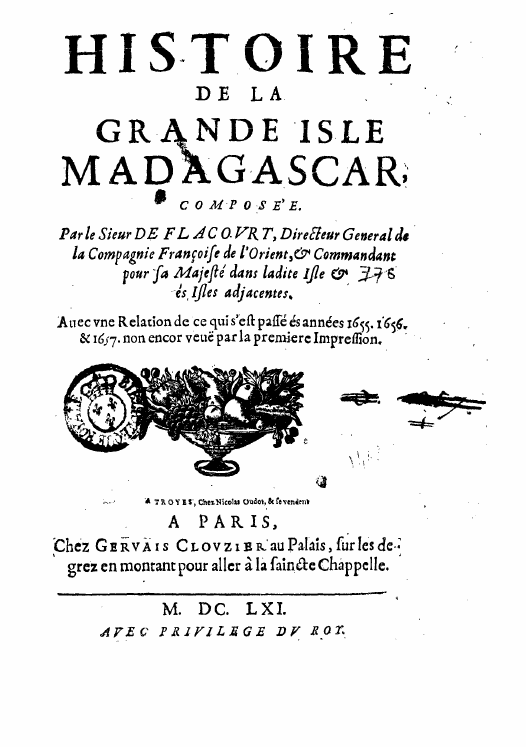
l'Histoire de la Grande Isle Madagascar

Flacourt restored order among the French soldiers, who had mutinied. In his dealings with the Malagasy, he was less successful; he was continually harassed by their intrigues and attacks during his entire term of office.

In 1655, he returned to France and, not long after, he was appointed director general of the company; after again returning to Madagascar, he drowned on his voyage home on the 10th of June 1660. He is the author of a Histoire de la grande isle de Madagascar (1st edition 1658, 2nd edition 1661).

Flacourt was one of the few, if not the only, Westerners to have recorded knowledge of the elephant birds, sloth lemurs, giant fossas, and dwarf hippopotamus of Madagascar when they were possibly still extant.

Flacourtia, a genus of flowering plants in the willow family, Salicaceae, was named in his honor .
