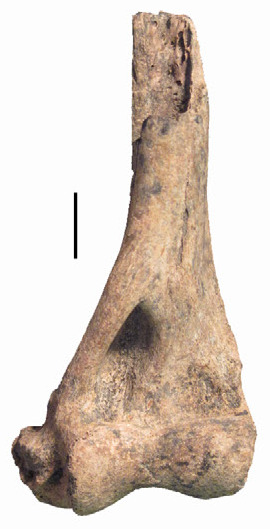
- Left distal humerus of C. spelea

Conservation status
- Extinct (pre 1658) (IUCN 3.1)

Scientific classification
- Kingdom: Animalia
- Phylum: Chordata
- Class: Mammalia
- Order: Carnivora
- Family: Eupleridae
- Genus: Cryptoprocta
- Species: †C. spelea

Binomial name
- †Cryptoprocta spelea Grandidier, 1902
- Subfossil sites for Cryptoprocta species: blue—C. spelea; green—C. ferox and C. spelea; red—C. ferox

Synonyms
- Cryptoprocta ferox var. spelea Grandidier, 1902; Cryptoprocta spelea Petit, 1935; Cryptoprocta antamba Lamberton, 1939

= Cryptoprocta spelea =

Cryptoprocta spelea Temporal range: Holocene

Extinct species of carnivoran from Madagascar

Cryptoprocta spelea, also known as the giant fossa or the cave fossa, is an extinct species of carnivore from Madagascar in the family Eupleridae which is most closely related to the mongooses and includes all Malagasy carnivorans.

It was first named in 1902, and was subsequently recognized as a separate species in 1935 from its closest relative, the living fossa (Cryptoprocta ferox). C. spelea was larger than its extant relative but otherwise similar. The two have not always been recognized as distinct species. When and how C. spelea became extinct remains unknown; however, some researchers suggest that the species may have gone extinct much more recently or possibly survived to this day based on anecdotal evidence including reports of unusually large fossas.

The species is known from subfossil bones found in a variety of caves in northern, western, southern, and central Madagascar. In some sites, it occurs with remains of C. ferox, but there is no evidence that the two lived in the same places at the same time. Living species of comparably sized, related carnivores in other regions are able to coexist, suggesting that C. spelea and C. ferox may have done the same. Due to its larger size, C. spelea likely preyed on animals too large for its smaller relative, including the recently extinct giant lemurs. The oldest known subfossils of C. spelea date to 8,300 years ago, although the timing of the extinction is unclear.

== Taxonomy ==
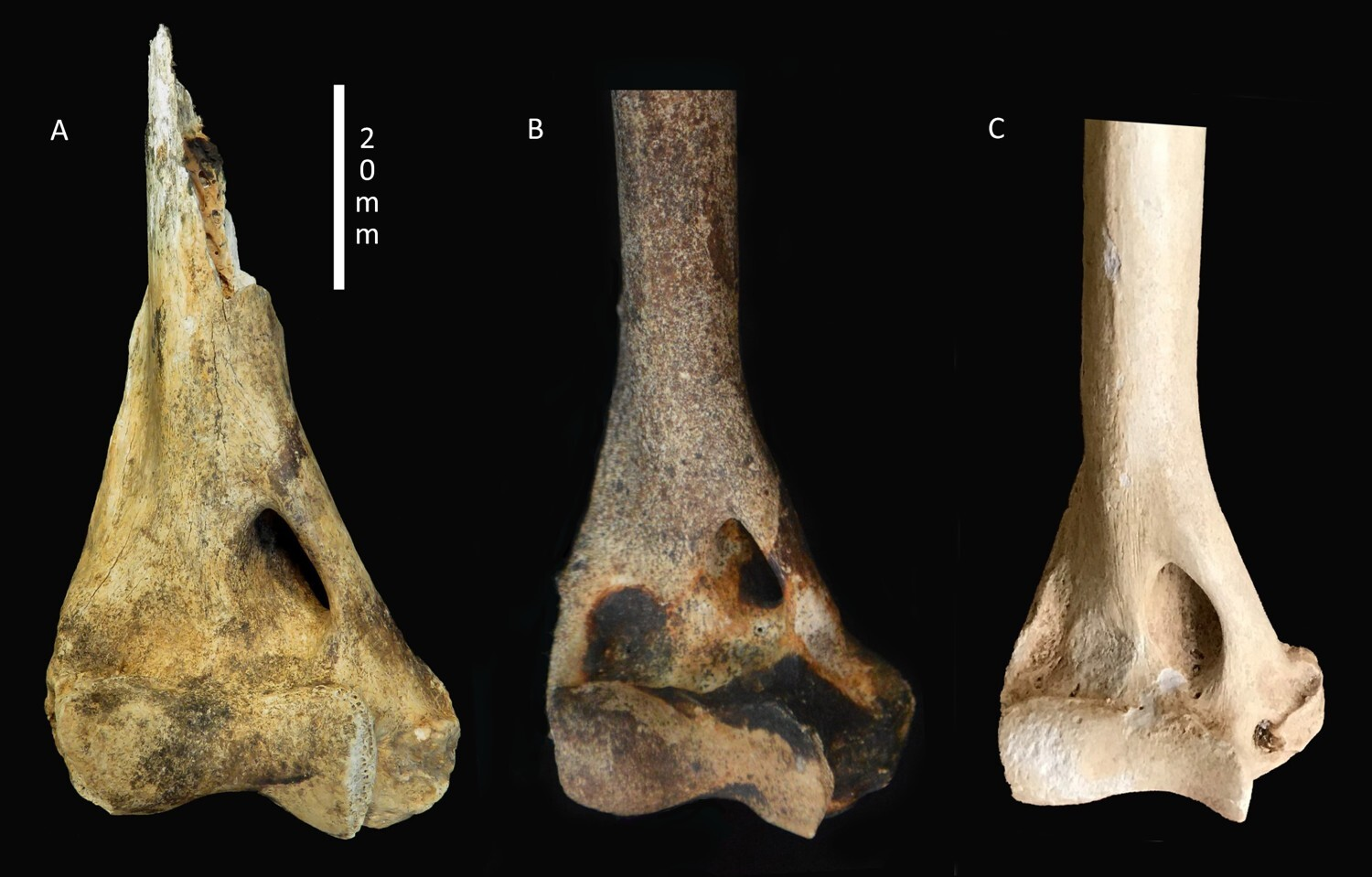
Distal humerus of C. spelea (middle) compared to that of C. bevatabe (left) and C. ferox (right)

In 1902, Guillaume Grandidier listed subfossil carnivoran remains from two caves on Madagascar as a larger "variety" of the living fossa (Cryptoprocta ferox), C. ferox var. spelea, without a detailed description or holotype designation. In 1935, Gabriel Petit considered spelea to represent a distinct species, but did not assign any specimen as the holotype. Charles Lamberton reviewed the subfossil and living Cryptoprocta remains in 1939, and assigned other specimens found in different localities to C. spelea, agreeing with Petit in the recognition of two species. The generic name Cryptoprocta translates to "hidden anus" referring to the fact that the anus is hidden by anal sacs in C. ferox. The specific name spelea means "cave" and was given because of the location of its discovery. However, Lamberton apparently had at most three skeletons of the living fossa, not nearly enough to capture the range of variation in that species, and some later authors did not separate C. spelea and C. ferox as two distinct species.

Steven Goodman and colleagues, using larger samples, compiled another set of Cryptoprocta measurements that was published in a 2004 article. They found that some subfossil Cryptoprocta fell outside the range of variation of living C. ferox, and identified those as representing C. spelea. Grandidier had not designated a type specimen for the species, and no material described by Grandidier that is associated with the name spelea can be located in the collections of the National Museum of Natural History, France (MNHN). To maintain C. spelea as the name for the larger form of the fossa, Goodman and colleagues proposed a well-preserved specimen MNHN CG 1977.755 to be designated as the neotype.

Lamberton recognized a third species, Cryptoprocta antamba, on the basis of a mandible (lower jaw) with abnormally broad spacing between the condyloid processes at the back. He also referred two femora (upper leg bones) and a tibia (lower leg bone) intermediate in size between C. spelea and C. ferox to this species. The specific name refers to the "antamba", an animal allegedly from southern Madagascar described by Étienne de Flacourt in 1658 as a large, rare, leopard-like carnivore that eats men and calves and lives in remote mountainous areas; it may have been the giant fossa.

Goodman and colleagues could not locate Lamberton's material of Cryptoprocta antamba, but suggested that it was an abnormal C. spelea based on the existing photograph. This synonymy was later supported by the describers of the largest known species of the genus, C. bevatabe, who also reviewed the same photograph independently. Together, the modern fossa, C. spelea and C. bevatabe form the genus Cryptoprocta within the family Eupleridae, which also includes the other Malagasy carnivorans—the falanouc, the fanalokas, and the Galidiinae. DNA sequence studies suggest that the Eupleridae form a single natural (monophyletic) group and are most closely related to the mongooses of Eurasia and mainland Africa.

== Description ==
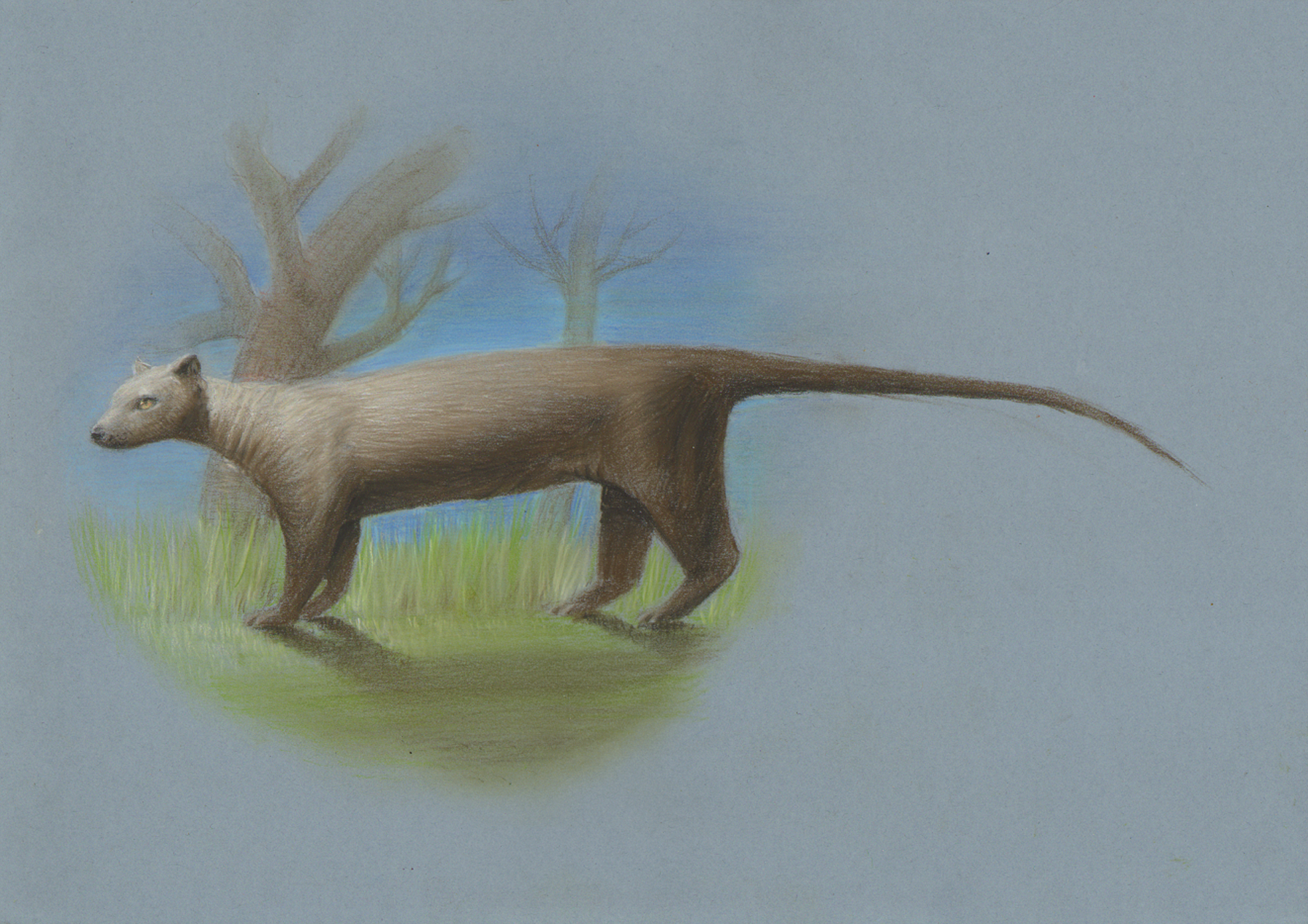
Hypothetical life restoration

Although some morphological differences between the two fossa species have been described, these may be allometric (growth-related), and in their 1986 Mammalian Species account of the fossa, Michael Köhncke and Klaus Leonhardt wrote that the two were morphologically identical. However, remains of C. spelea are larger than any living C. ferox.

Goodman and colleagues found that spelea were 1.07 to 1.32 times as large as in adult C. ferox, and postcranial measurements were 1.19 to 1.37 times as large. The only specimen of C. spelea in which condylobasal length (a measure of total skull length) could be ascertained measured 153.4 mm (6.04 in), compared to a range of 114.5 to 133.3 mm (4.51 to 5.25 in) in adult C. ferox. Humerus (upper arm bone) length in twelve C. spelea is 122.7 to 146.8 mm (4.83 to 5.78 in), averaging 137.9 mm (5.43 in), compared to 108.5 to 127.5 mm (4.27 to 5.02 in), averaging 116.1 mm (4.57 in), in the extant fossa. Body mass estimates for C. spelea varied based on methods of body mass used. Fossil evidence suggests C. spelea had a geographic variation in size as Mitoho specimens were larger than specimens from other localities. Burnes et al. (2001) estimated C. spelea weighed range 17 kg (37 lb) based on an unknown method. Wroe et al. (2004) suggested the species weighed 20 kg (44 lb) based on skull regressions. Meador et al. (2019) estimated C. spelea weighed 12.6 kg (28 lb) based on postcranial remains. Lewis et al. (2026) estimated that the Mitoho specimens weighed 15–27 kg (33–60 lb) based on humeral regressions, with other C. spelea weighing 11–24 kg (24–53 lb). In comparison, adult C. ferox range from 5 kg (11 lb) to 10 kg (22 lb). C. spelea is considered to be one of the largest carnivores of the island.

== Distribution and ecology ==
Collection sites
Site	spe.	fer.
Ankazoabo	+	
Antsirabe	+	+
Behova	+	+
Beloha	+	+
Belo sur Mer	+	+
Bemafandry	+	
Betioky	+	
Lakaton'ny akanga	+	
Lelia		+
Manombo	+	+
Tsiandroina	+	
Tsiravé		+
Abbreviations: spe.: C. spelea; fer.: C. ferox

Subfossil remains of the giant fossa have been found in Holocene cave sites from the northern end of Madagascar along the west coast to the far south, and in the central highlands. The known radiocarbon dated subfossil specimens of C. spelea and modern C. ferox suggest that the two species overlapped in age. The size ratio between the two species is within the range of ratios seen between similar-sized living cats and mongooses found in the same areas, suggesting that the two species may have been able to occur together.

With its large size and massive jaws and teeth, C. spelea was a formidable, "puma-like" predator, and in addition to smaller prey it may have eaten some of the big, now extinct subfossil lemurs that would have been too large for C. ferox. This is further supported by bone collagen isotopic values which found evidence niche partitioning between C. spelea and C. ferox. No subfossil evidence has been found to definitively show that lemurs were its prey; this assumption is based on the diet of the smaller, extant species of fossa. Isotopic analysis by Lewis et al. (2026) confirms C. spelea was targeting large-bodied extinct lemurs. Other possible prey include tenrecs, smaller euplerids, and even young Malagasy hippopotamuses.

Much like C. ferox, it has been hypothesized that C. spelea may have hunted cooperatively to hunt larger prey. Furthermore, it has been hypothesized cooperative hunting within C. spelea was more common in the Mitoho, as the locality larger specimens. This has been noted in C. ferox, with cooperative individuals going larger than solitary individuals. Prior to 8.3 Ka, it may have competed with the larger C. bevatabe in the coastal southwest region, although niche partitioning was still possible by preferring prey of different body sizes.

== Extinction ==
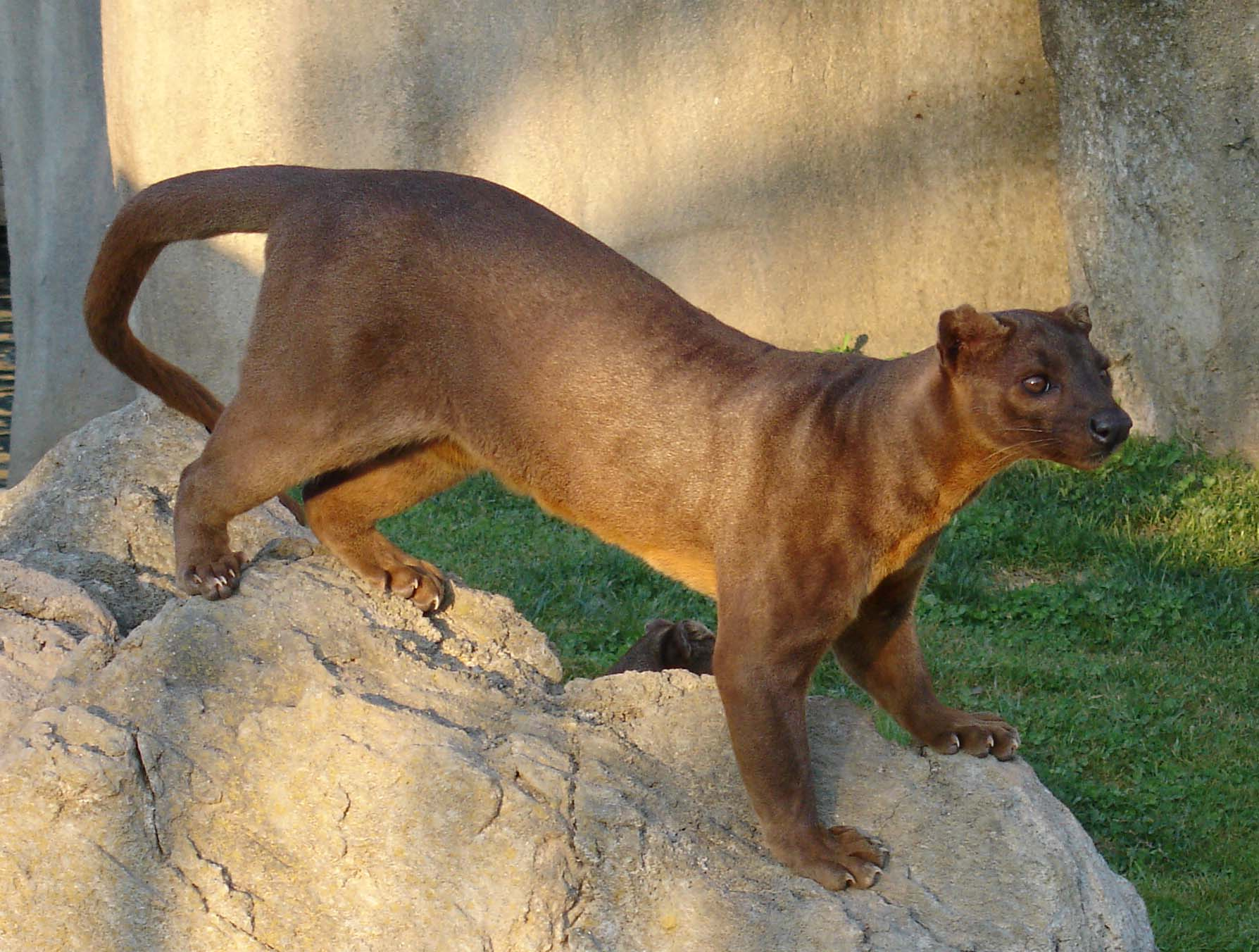
The fossa (Cryptoprocta ferox) is a smaller relative of C. spelea that still survives.

The specific reason and time for the extinction of C. spelea is not known. Of the three known radiocarbon dated subfossils of C. spelea, the youngest record is represented by a single femur (UA 10556) dated to 1740 ± 120 years calibrated BP. Goodman et al. (2004) suggested that C. spelea went extinct before 1400, while the IUCN Red List listed its time of extinction as before 1658.

Local people on Madagascar often recognize two forms of fossa, a larger fosa mainty (or "black Cryptoprocta") and a smaller fosa mena (or "reddish Cryptoprocta"). There are also some anecdotal records of very large living fossas, such as the alleged record of a 2 m (6 ft 7 in), 30 kg (66 lb) fossa captured at Morondava in 1954. Goodman and colleagues suggested that further research may demonstrate that there is more than one species of fossa yet alive.

In 2021, Eva Stela Nomenjanahary and colleagues interviewed 90 local people in the Montagne d’Ambre, 42 of whom shared knowledge of a large carnivoran mammal. Among the 42 collected cases, 91% claimed to have seen the animal personally with dates ranging from 1980 to 2020, and more than half mentioned consistent body proportions with euplerids and size similar to or larger than that of a dog. The authors suggested that these anecdotal evidence likely suggest a more recent extinction or current presence of C. spelea in Madagascar. The second author, Benjamin Freed, also claimed to have seen a large, dark fossa in 1989, which he suspected as an encounter with C. spelea.

C. spelea, as well as C. bevatabe, were the only extinct carnivoran mammals known from Madagascar; recently extinct (non-carnivoran) Madagascan animals also include large lemurs, elephant birds, and Malagasy hippopotamuses. The extinction of C. spelea may have changed predation dynamics on Madagascar due to Madagascar's larger terrestrial vertebrates experiencing the lack of predator pressure.
