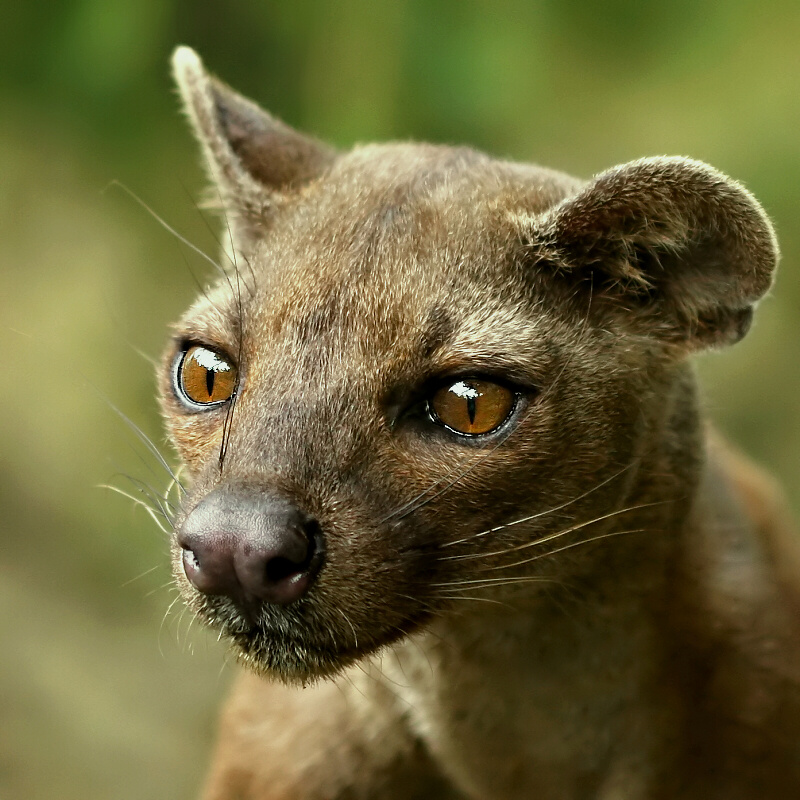
- Fossa (Cryptoprocta ferox)

Scientific classification
- Kingdom: Animalia
- Phylum: Chordata
- Class: Mammalia
- Order: Carnivora
- Family: Eupleridae
- Subfamily: Euplerinae
- Genus: Cryptoprocta; Bennett, 1833

Species
- Cryptoprocta ferox Bennett, 1833; †Cryptoprocta spelea Grandidier, 1902; †Cryptoprocta bevatabe Lewis et al., 2026

= Cryptoprocta =

Cryptoprocta Temporal range: Holocene - Recent

Genus of mammals

Cryptoprocta is a genus of carnivoran endemic to Madagascar. It contains the living fossa and its two larger, recently extinct relatives, Cryptoprocta spelea and Cryptoprocta bevatabe. The fossa is the largest of Madagascar's mammalian carnivores; the extant fossa is a generalist carnivore, capable of hunting even the largest living lemurs. The two extinct species are thought to have hunted the extinct lemurs that once inhabited the island, both of which were larger than the extant species.

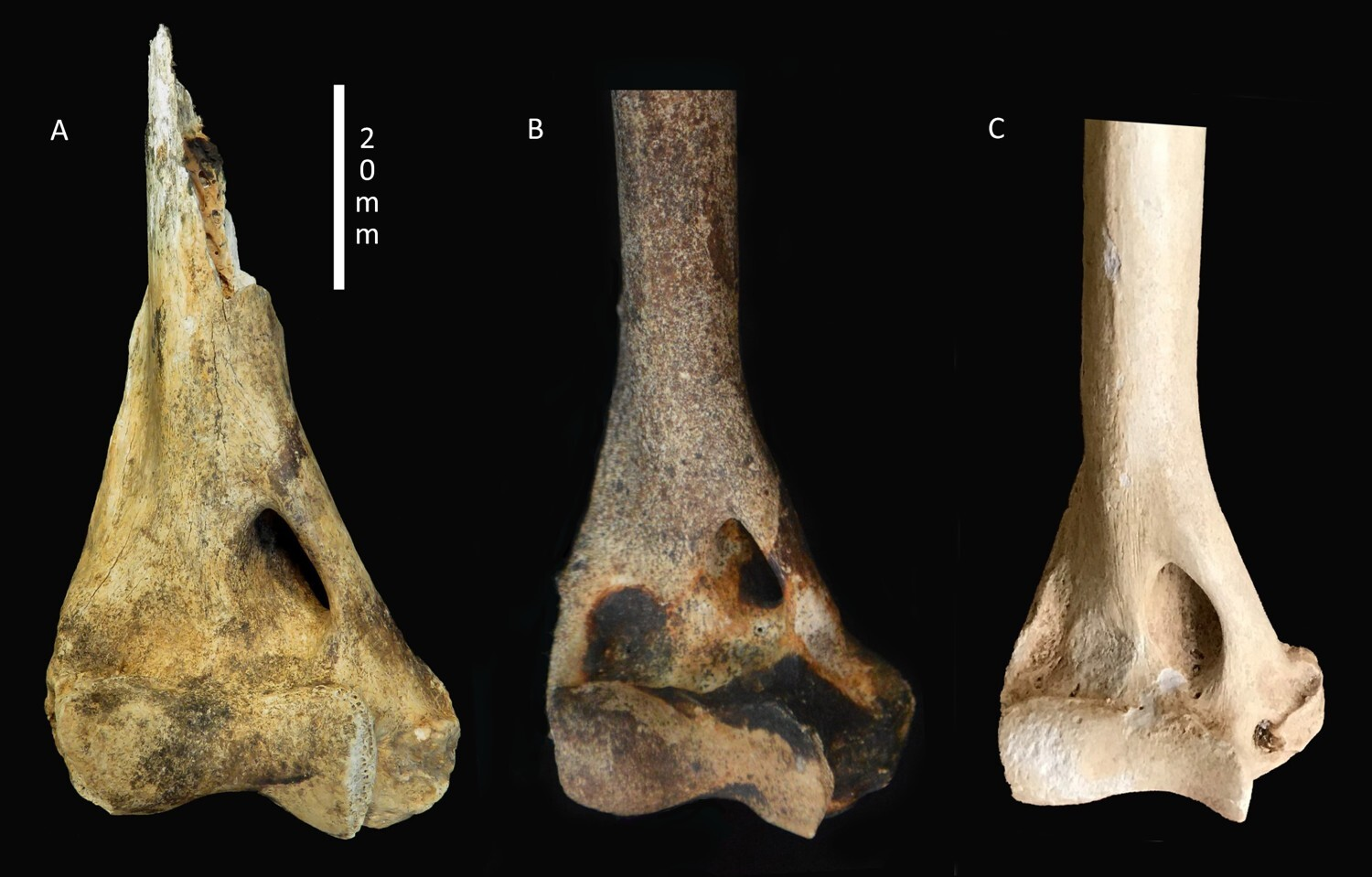
Humeri of †C. bevatabe (A), †C. spelea (B), and C. ferox (C)
