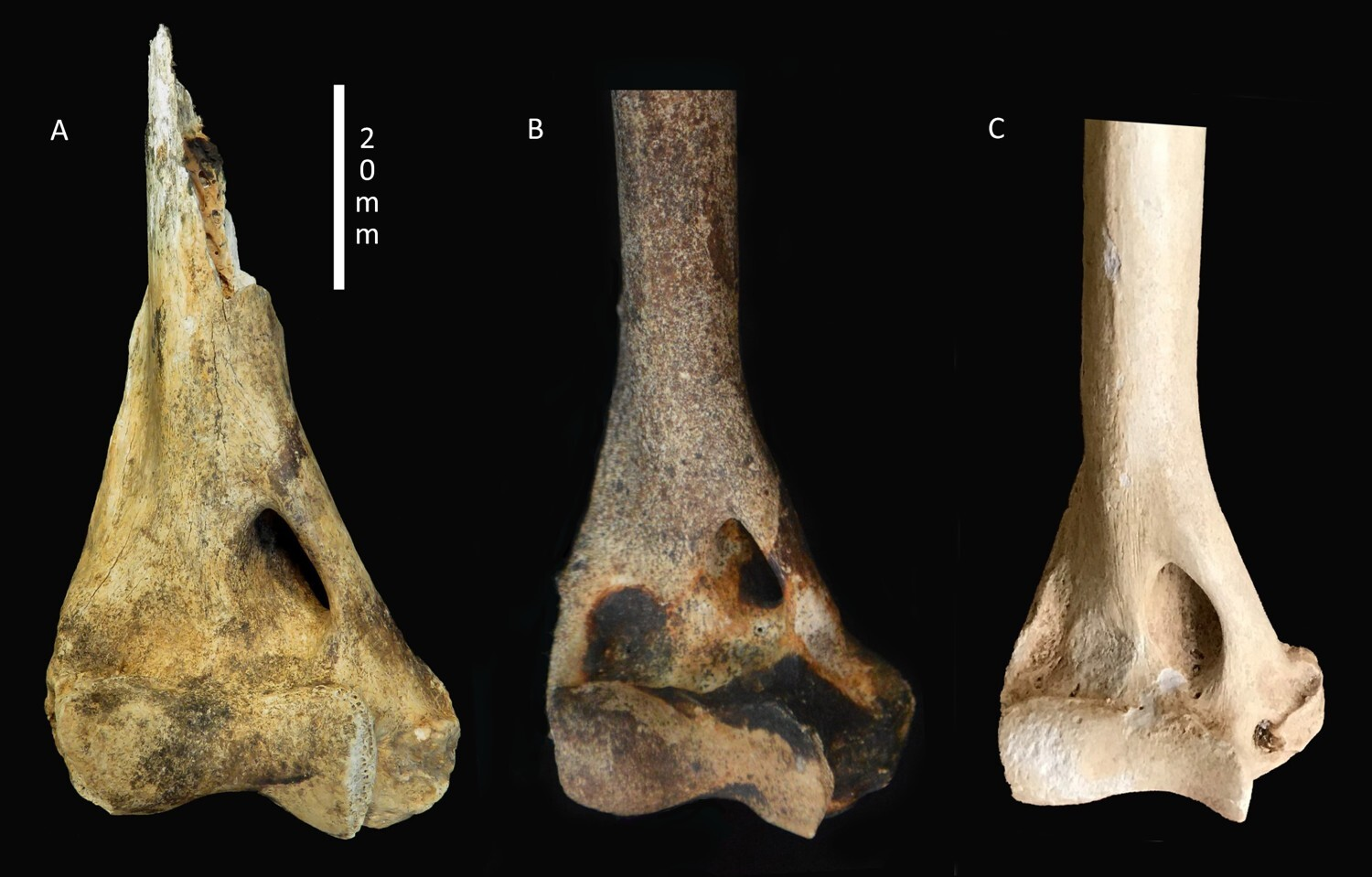
- The holotype of Cryptoprocta bevatabe (A) compared to C. spelea (B) and C. ferox (C)

Scientific classification
- Kingdom: Animalia
- Phylum: Chordata
- Class: Mammalia
- Order: Carnivora
- Family: Eupleridae
- Genus: Cryptoprocta
- Species: †C. bevatabe

Binomial name
- †Cryptoprocta bevatabe Lewis et al., 2026

= Cryptoprocta bevatabe =

Cryptoprocta bevatabe Temporal range: Holocene

Extinct carnivoran species from Madagascar

Cryptoprocta bevatabe is an extinct species of Cryptoprocta that lived in Madagascar prior to 8,300 years ago. Cryptoprocta (which includes the living fossa) is part of a family of carnivorans known as Eupleridae, which includes every endemic Malagasy carnivoran and were closely related to mongooses. This species of Crpytoprocta is noted to have been significantly larger than C. spelea, with a mean body mass of 29 kg (64 lb). Despite its larger size, it was still just as proficient at climbing compared to the extant fossa.

Due to its large size, C. bevatabe was thought to have been an apex predator hunting giant lemurs such as Megaladapis. Much like the modern fossa, males could've hunted cooperatively to take down prey larger than itself.

== Taxonomy ==
=== Discovery ===
The holotype of Cryptoprocta bevatabe was first discovered in a underwater cave system in Mitoho, Tsimanampesotse National Park, in Madagascar. The holotype was collected in depths of 22m from a crevice in a water-filled chimney. This species is only known from one specimen being UABEC 0039 with it composing of a single distal third of the right humerus.

=== Etymology ===
Cryptoprocta bevatabe was first mentioned by Godfrey et al. (2021), with the authors referring it as "a new, much larger species of extinct Cryptoprocta". Lewis et al. (2026) classified the large Cryptoprocta species as C. bevatabe, which was a combination of two Malagasy words, 'bevata' and 'be'. 'Bevata' meant 'heavy' or 'big', with 'be' meaning 'very' or 'a lot'. When used together, 'bevatabe' means enormous.

== Description ==
Cryptoprocta bevatabe was the largest known euplerid and likely an apex predator. Humeral regressions estimate C. bevatabe to weigh between 27.88–42.92 kg (61–95 lb), with a median mass of 29 kg (64 lb), making it significantly larger than C. spelea. The authors estimated it had a head-body length of 113 cm (3.71 ft), with its tail measuring 104 cm (3.41 ft). Similar to the other species of Cryptoprocta, the capitulum was relatively round, medial epicondyle projects posteromedially from the trochlea, a large entepicondylar foramen, and the absence of the supratrochlear foramen.

However, it differs from other species with a greater distance between the entepicondylar foramen and anterosuperior edge of the trochlea, as well as the more rounded capitulum projecting more posteriorly, and a shallower olecranon fossa. The humerus was significantly more robust than C. ferox, and more robust than C. spelea in some dimensions.

== Paleobiology ==
=== Locomotion ===
Despite the larger size of Cryptoprocta bevatabe, the anatomy of its humerus suggests it was just as proficient at climbing as its extant cousins. The posterior lateral crest was less distinct and projects less in C. bevatabe compared to C. ferox, which can be associated with arboreal locomotion. Additionally, the humeral trochlea was slightly deeper, suggesting a more stable humeroulnar joint with greater supinatory abilities. The area of brachioradialis muscle attachment was larger in C. bevatabe, suggesting the species had the ability to place palms on either side of the tree branch.

=== Predatory behavior ===
Skull of Megaladapis madagascariensis, bite trace evidence suggests C. bevatabe predated upon these giant lemurs.

Evidence of predation on giant lemurs such as Megaladapis by Cryptoprocta was reported in 2019; though originally suspected to be caused by C. spelea, Lewis et al. suggested C. bevatabe may have been the more likely candidate due to its larger size. C. bevatabe and C. spelea likely competed for prey in the coastal southwest region, although they niche partitioned with C. spelea hunting smaller giant lemurs. This would have allowed the two extinct species, as well as the extant fossa, to coexist in the same area. Much like the extant fossa, it is possible that male C. bevatabe would've hunted cooperatively to take down larger prey.
