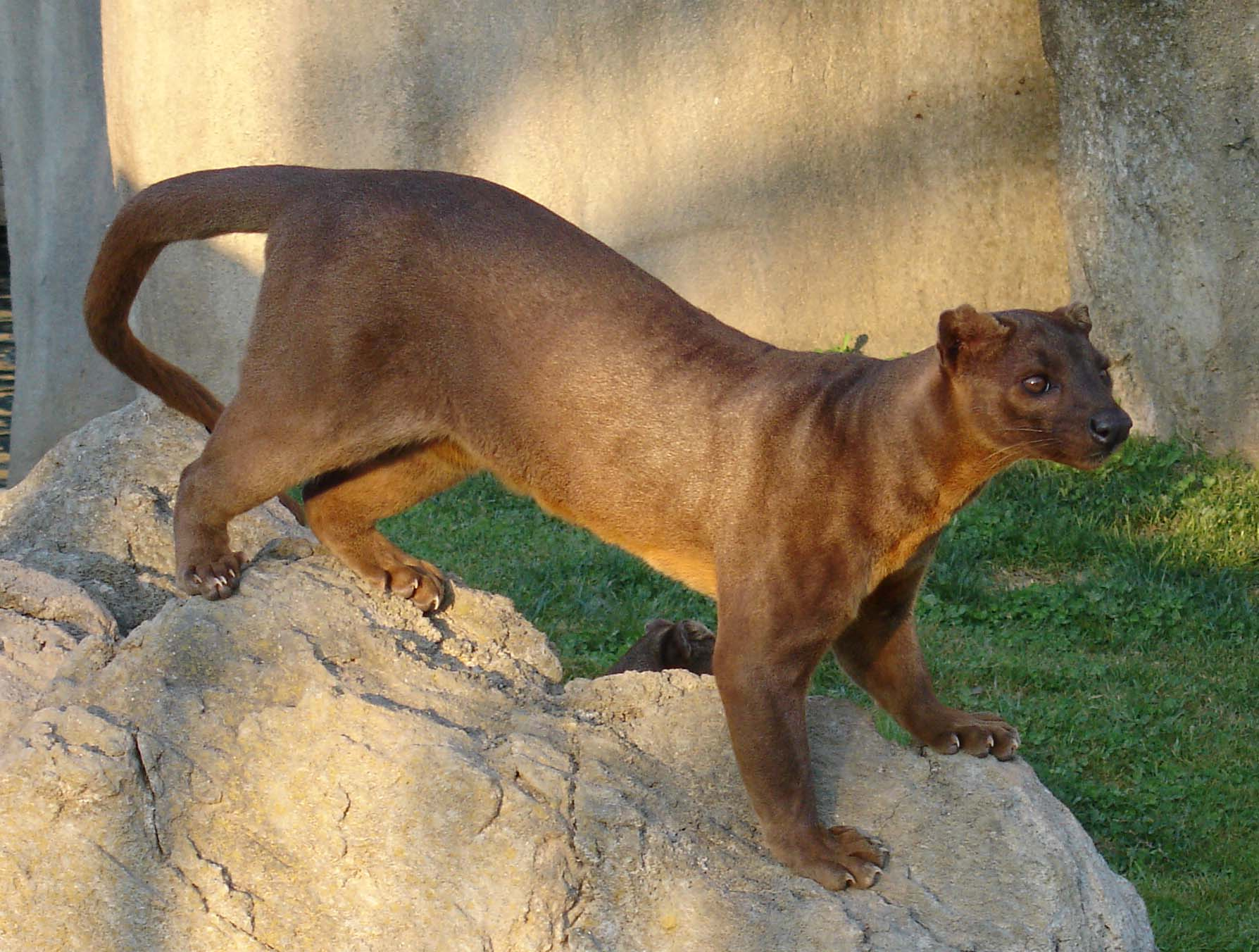
- At the Valencia Bioparc

Conservation status
- Vulnerable (IUCN 3.1)
- CITES Appendix II

Scientific classification
- Kingdom: Animalia
- Phylum: Chordata
- Class: Mammalia
- Order: Carnivora
- Family: Eupleridae
- Genus: Cryptoprocta
- Species: C. ferox

Binomial name
- Cryptoprocta ferox Bennett, 1833
- Distribution of Cryptoprocta ferox (red-shaded area)

Synonyms
- C. typicus A. Smith, 1834

= Fossa (animal) =

Cat-like species of mammal from Madagascar

The fossa (Cryptoprocta ferox; /ˈfɒsə/ FOSS-ə or /ˈfuːsə/ FOO-sə; Malagasy: [ˈfusə̥]) is a slender, long-tailed, cat-like mammal that is endemic to Madagascar. It is a member of the carnivoran family Eupleridae.

The fossa is the largest mammalian carnivore on Madagascar and has been compared to a small cougar, as it has convergently evolved many cat-like features. Adults have a head-body length of 70–80 cm (28–31 in) and weigh between 5.5 and 8.6 kg (12 and 19 lb), with the males larger than the females. It has semi-retractable claws (meaning it can extend but not retract its claws fully) and flexible ankles that allow it to climb up and down trees head-first, and also support jumping from tree to tree. Two larger extinct relatives of the species are known, Cryptoprocta spelea and Cryptoprocta bevatabe, with the former probably becoming extinct before 1400.

The species is widespread, although population densities are usually low. It is found solely in forested habitat, and actively hunts both by day and night. Over 50% of its diet consists of lemurs, the endemic primates found on the island; tenrecs, rodents, lizards, birds, and other animals are also documented as prey. Mating usually occurs in trees on horizontal limbs and can last for several hours. Litters range from one to six pups, which are born altricial (blind and toothless). Infants wean after 4.5 months and are independent after a year. Sexual maturity occurs around three to four years of age, and life expectancy in captivity is 20 years. The fossa is listed as a vulnerable species on the IUCN Red List. It is often protected by Malagasy fady taboo. The greatest threat to the fossa is habitat destruction.

Its taxonomic classification has been controversial because its physical traits resemble those of cats, yet other traits suggest a close relationship with viverrids. Its classification, along with that of the other Malagasy carnivores, influenced hypotheses about how many times mammalian carnivores have colonized Madagascar. With genetic studies demonstrating that the fossa and all other Malagasy carnivores are most closely related to each other forming a clade, recognized as the family Eupleridae, carnivorans are now thought to have colonized the island once, around 18–20 million years ago.

== Etymology ==
The generic name Cryptoprocta refers to how the animal's anus is hidden by its anal pouch, from the Ancient Greek words crypto- "hidden", and procta "anus". The species name ferox is the Latin adjective "fierce" or "wild". Its common name comes from the word fosa Malagasy pronunciation: [ˈfusə̥] in Malagasy, an Austronesian language, and some authors have adopted the Malagasy spelling in English.

The word is similar to posa (meaning "cat") in the Iban language (another Austronesian language) from Borneo, and both terms may derive from trade languages from the 1600s. However, an alternative etymology suggests a link to another word that comes from Malay: pusa refers to the Malayan weasel (Mustela nudipes). The Malay word pusa could have become posa for cats in Borneo, while in Madagascar the word could have become fosa to refer to the fossa.

== Taxonomy ==
The fossa was formally described by Edward Turner Bennett on the basis of a specimen from Madagascar sent by Charles Telfair in 1833. The common name is the same as the generic name of the Malagasy civet (Fossa fossana), but they are different species. Because of shared physical traits with viverrids, mongooses, and Felidae, its classification has been controversial. Bennett originally placed the fossa as a type of civet in the family Viverridae, a classification that long remained popular among taxonomists. Its compact braincase, large eye sockets, retractable claws, and specialized carnivorous dentition have also led some taxonomists to associate it with the felids. In 1939, William King Gregory and Milo Hellman placed the fossa in its own subfamily within Felidae, the Cryptoproctinae. George Gaylord Simpson placed it back in Viverridae in 1945, still within its own subfamily, yet conceded it had many cat-like characteristics.

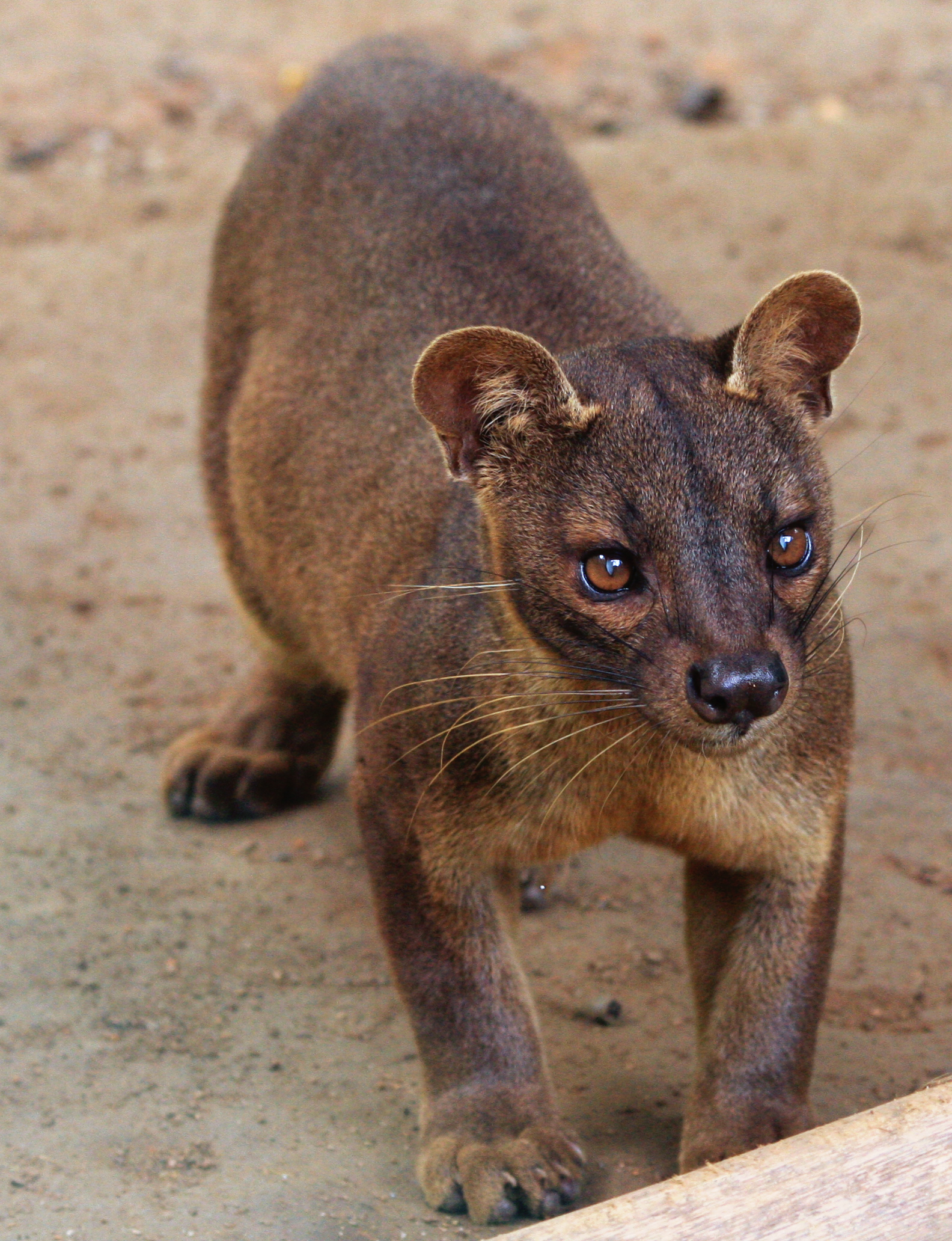
The fossa has a cat-like appearance, resembling a small cougar.

In 1993, Géraldine Veron and François Catzeflis published a DNA hybridization study suggesting that the fossa was more closely related to mongooses (family Herpestidae) than to cats or civets. However, in 1995, Veron's morphological study once again grouped it with Felidae. In 2003, molecular phylogenetic studies using nuclear and mitochondrial genes by Anne Yoder and colleagues showed that all native Malagasy carnivorans share a common ancestry that excludes other carnivores (meaning they form a clade, making them monophyletic) and are most closely related to Asian and African Herpestidae. To reflect these relationships, all Malagasy carnivorans are now placed in a single family, Eupleridae. Within Eupleridae, the fossa is placed in the subfamily Euplerinae along with the falanouc (Eupleres goudoti) and Malagasy civet, but its exact relationships are poorly resolved.

An extinct relative of the fossa was described in 1902 from subfossil remains and recognized as a separate species, Cryptoprocta spelea, in 1935. This species was larger than the living fossa (with a body mass estimate of around 10–20 kg), but otherwise similar. An even larger extinct species, Cryptoprocta bevatabe, was described in 2026. Robustly-built and with greater derivity in its climbing adaptations, it was Madagascar's largest terrestrial mammalian carnivore (with a body mass of around 27–43 kg). Across Madagascar, people distinguish threes kinds of fossa—a large fosa mainty ("black fossa"), a mid-sized fosa ondry ("off-white fossa"), and the small fosa mena ("reddish fossa"). It is unclear whether this is purely folklore or individual variation—related to sex, age or instances of melanism and leucism—or whether there is indeed more than one species of living fossa.

Phylogeny of Eupleridae within Feliformia

- Feliformia
  - (other feliforms)
  - - Viverridae (civets, genets, and their relatives)
    - - Hyaenidae (hyenas)
      - - Herpestidae (mongooses)
        - - Eupleridae (Malagasy carnivores)

Phylogeny of Malagasy carnivorans (Eupleridae)

- Eupleridae
  - - Cryptoprocta
      - C. ferox (Fossa)
      - †C. spelea (giant cave fossa)
    - Fossa (Malagasy civet)
  - Eupleres
  - - Galidia (ring-tailed mongoose)
    - - Galidictis
      - - Salanoia
        - Mungotictis (narrow-striped mongoose)

== Description ==
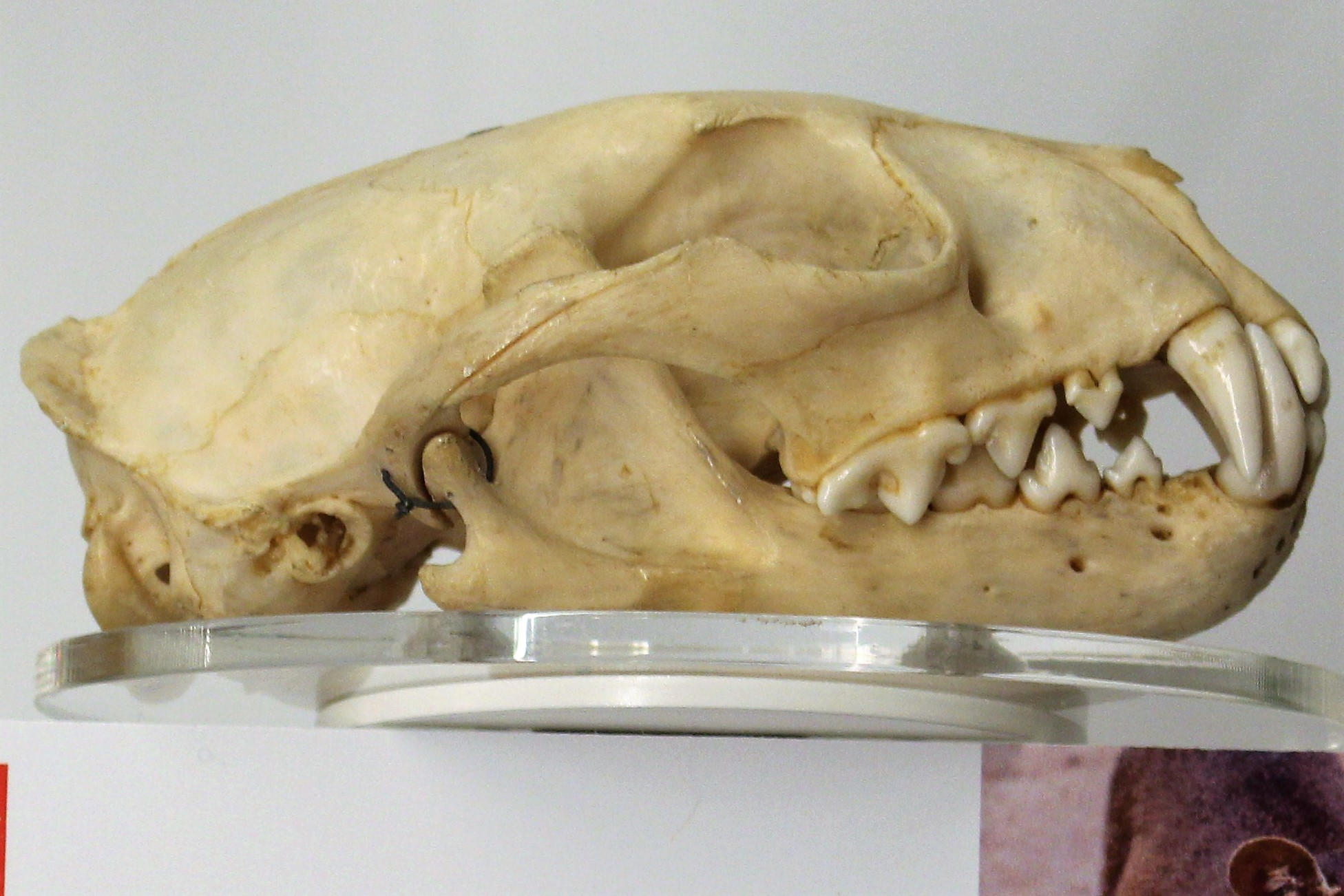
Skull of a fossa

The fossa appears as a diminutive form of a large felid, such as a cougar, but with a slender body and muscular limbs, and a tail nearly as long as the rest of the body. It has a mongoose-like head, relatively longer than that of a cat, although with a muzzle that is broad and short, and with large but rounded ears. It has medium brown eyes set relatively wide apart with pupils that contract to slits. Like many carnivorans that hunt at night, its eyes reflect light; the reflected light is orange in hue. Its head-body length is 70–80 cm (28–31 in) and its tail is 65–70 cm (26–28 in) long. There is some sexual dimorphism, with adult males (weighing 6.2–8.6 kg or 14–19 lb) being larger than females (5.5–6.8 kg or 12–15 lb). Smaller individuals are typically found north and east on Madagascar, larger ones to the south and west. Unusually large individuals weighing up to 20 kg (44 lb) have been reported, but there is some doubt as to the reliability of the measurements. The fossa can smell, hear, and see well. It is a robust animal and illnesses are rare in captive fossas.

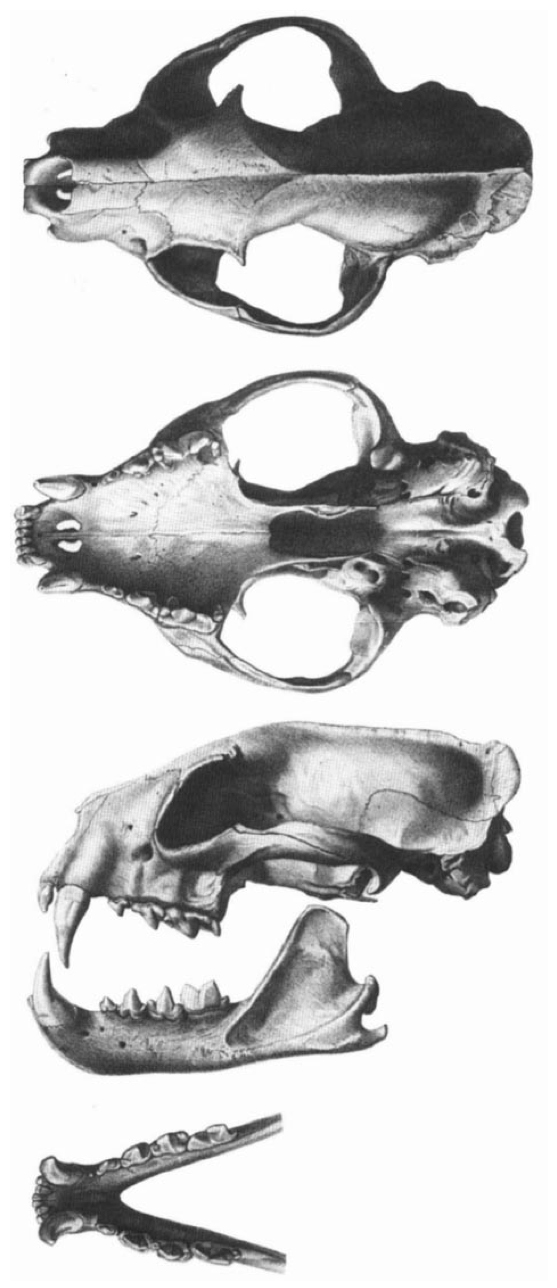
Cranium (dorsal, ventral, and lateral views) and mandible (lateral and dorsal views)

Both males and females have short, straight fur that is relatively dense and without spots or patterns. Both sexes are generally a reddish-brown dorsally and colored a dirty cream ventrally. When in rut, they may have an orange coloration to their abdomen from a reddish substance secreted by a chest gland, but this has not been consistently observed by all researchers. The tail tends to be lighter in coloration than the sides. Juveniles are either gray or nearly white.

Several of the animal's physical features are adaptions to climbing through trees. It uses its tail to assist balance and has semi-retractable claws that it uses to climb trees in its search for prey. It has semiplantigrade feet, switching between a plantigrade-like gait (when arboreal) and a digitigrade-like one (when terrestrial). The soles of its paws are nearly bare and covered with strong pads. The fossa has very flexible ankles that allow it to readily grasp tree trunks so as to climb up or down trees head first or to leap to another tree. Captive juveniles have been known to swing upside down by their hindfeet from knotted ropes.

The fossa has several scent glands, although the glands are less developed in females. Like herpestids it has a perianal skin gland inside an anal sac which surrounds the anus like a pocket. The pocket opens to the exterior with a horizontal slit below the tail. Other glands are located near the penis or vagina, with the penile glands emitting a strong odor. Like the herpestids, it has no prescrotal glands.

=== External genitalia ===
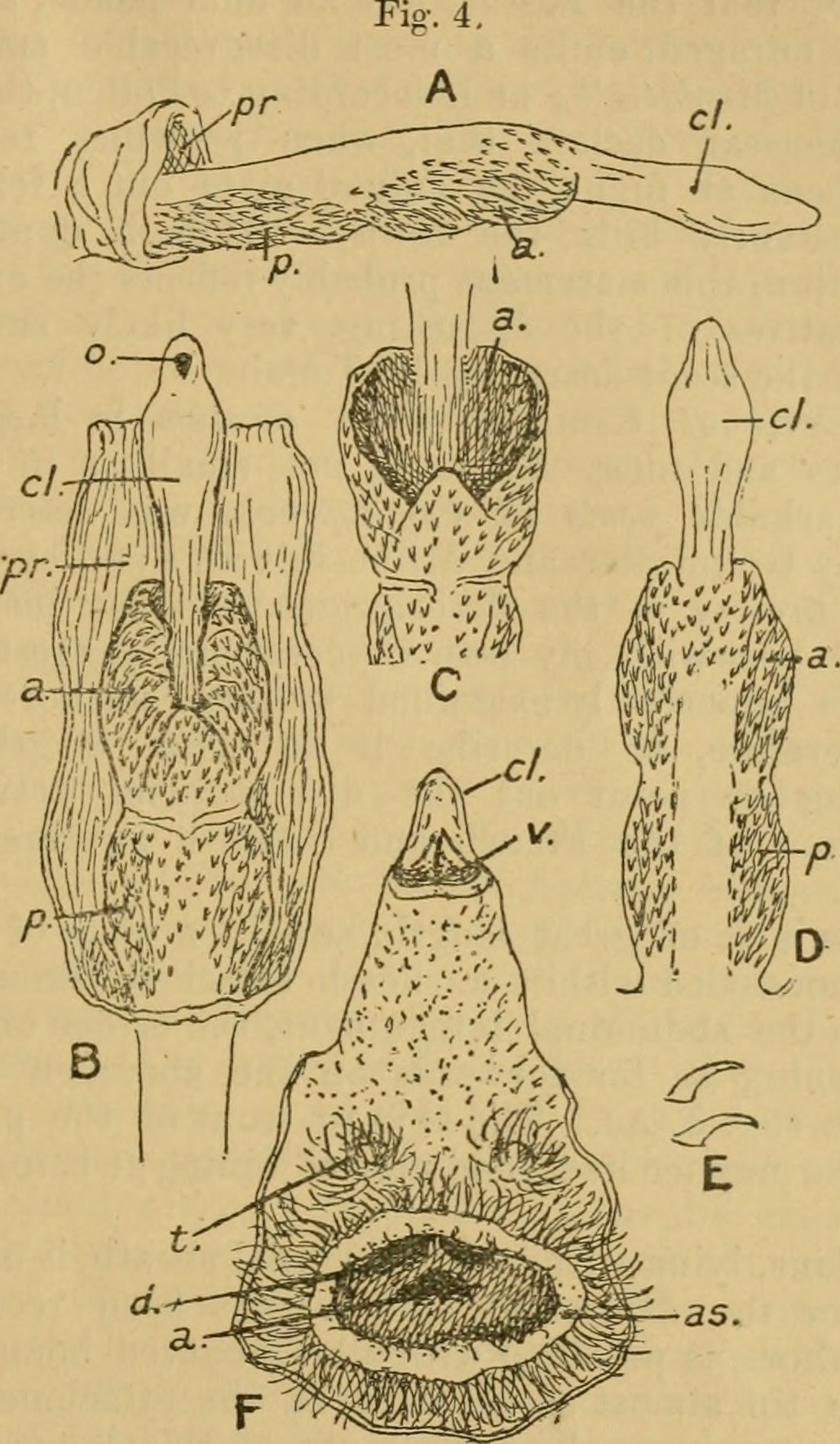
External genitalia of Cryptoprocta ferox

One of the more peculiar physical features of this species is its external genitalia. The fossa is unique within its family for the shape of its genitalia, which share traits with those of cats and hyenas. The male fossa has an unusually long penis and baculum (penis bone), reaching to between his forelegs when erect, with an average thickness of 20 mm (0.8 in). The glans extends about halfway down the shaft and is spiny except at the tip. In comparison, the glans of felids is short and spiny, while that of viverrids is smooth and long. The female fossa exhibits transient masculinization, starting at about 1–2 years of age, developing an enlarged, spiny clitoris that resembles a male's penis. The enlarged clitoris is supported by an os clitoridis, which decreases in size as the animal grows. The females do not have a pseudo-scrotum, but they do secrete an orange substance that colors their underparts, much like the secretions of males.

Hormone levels (testosterone, androstenedione, dihydrotestosterone) do not seem to play a part in this transient masculinization, as those levels are the same in masculinized juveniles and non-masculinized adults. It is speculated that the transient masculinization either reduces sexual harassment of juvenile females by adult males, or reduces aggression from territorial females. While females of other mammal species (such as the spotted hyena) have a pseudo-penis, no other is known to diminish in size as the animal grows.

=== Comparison with related carnivorans ===
Overall, the fossa has features in common with three different carnivoran families, leading researchers to place it and other members of Eupleridae alternatively in Herpestidae, Viverridae, and Felidae. Felid features are primarily those associated with eating and digestion, including tooth shape and facial portions of the skull, the tongue, and the digestive tract, typical of its exclusively carnivorous diet. The remainder of the skull most closely resembles skulls of genus Viverra, while the general body structure is most similar to that of various members of Herpestidae. The permanent dentition is 3.1.3-4.13.1.3-4.1 (three incisors, one canine, three or four premolars, and one molar on each side of both the upper and lower jaws), with the deciduous formula being similar but lacking the fourth premolar and the molar.

The fossa has a large, prominent rhinarium similar to that of viverrids, but has comparatively larger, round ears, almost as large as those of a similarly sized felid. Its facial vibrissae (whiskers) are long, with the longest being longer than its head. Like some mongoose genera, particularly Galidia (which is now in the fossa's own family, Eupleridae) and Herpestes (of Herpestidae), it has carpal vibrissae as well. Its claws are retractile, but unlike those of Felidae species, they are not hidden in skin sheaths. It has three pairs of nipples (one inguinal, one ventral, and one pectoral).

== Habitat and distribution ==
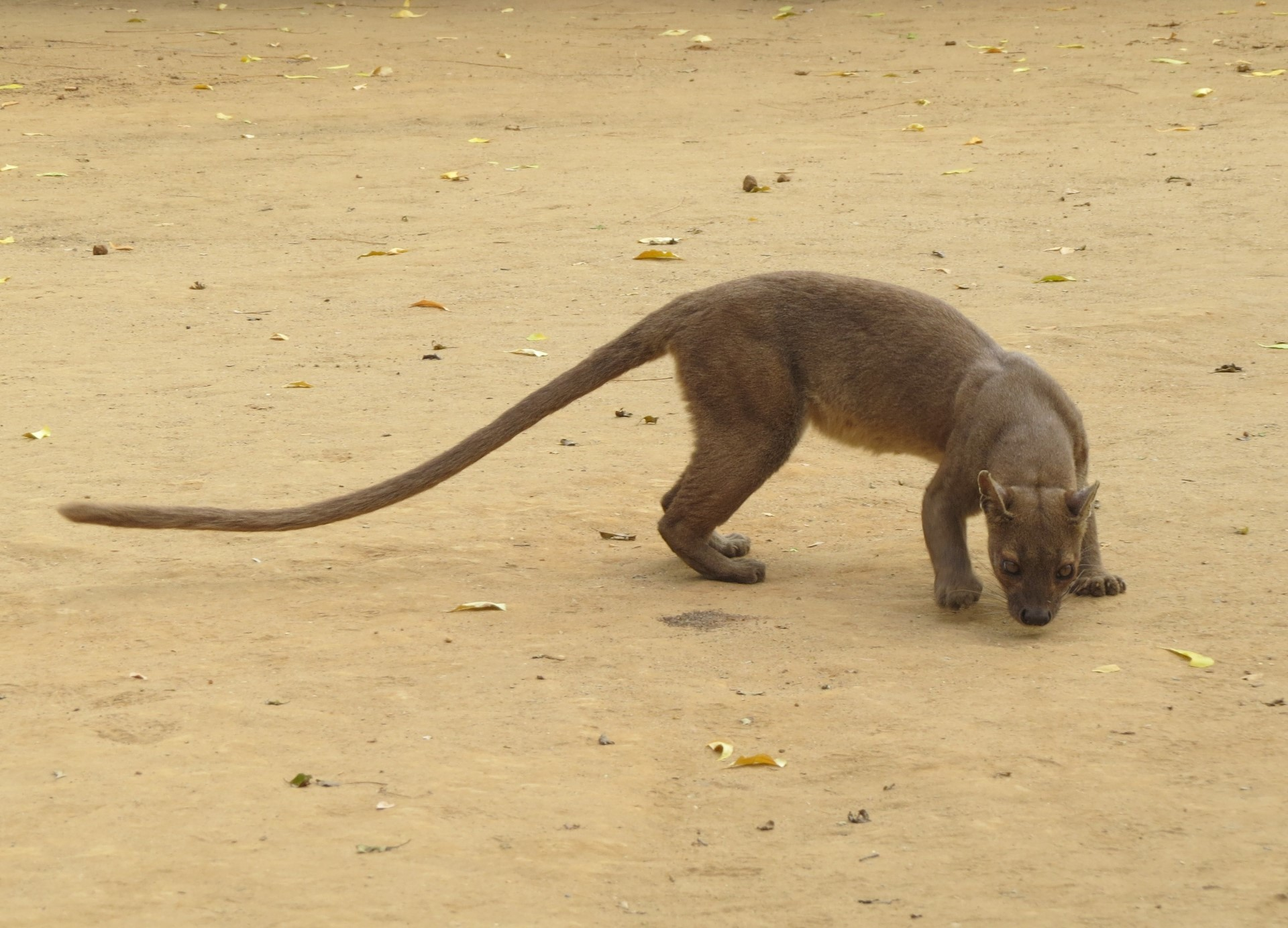
In Madagascar

The fossa has the most widespread geographical range of the Malagasy carnivores, and is generally found in low numbers throughout the island in remaining tracts of forest, preferring pristine undisturbed forest habitat. It is also encountered in some degraded forests, but in lower numbers. Although the fossa is found in all known forest habitats throughout Madagascar, including the western dry deciduous forests, the eastern rainforests, and the southern spiny forests, it is seen more frequently in humid than in dry forests. This may be because the reduced canopy in dry forests provides less shade, and also because the fossa seems to travel more easily in humid forests. It is absent from areas with the heaviest habitat disturbance and, like most of Madagascar's fauna, from the central high plateau of the country.

The fossa has been found across several different elevational gradients in undisturbed portions of protected areas throughout Madagascar. In the Réserve Naturelle Intégrale d'Andringitra, evidence of the fossa has been reported at four different sites ranging from 810 to 1,625 m (2,657 to 5,331 ft). Its highest known occurrence was reported at 2,000 m (6,600 ft); its presence high on the Andringitra Massif was subsequently confirmed in 1996. Similarly, evidence has been reported of the fossa at the elevational extremes of 440 m (1,440 ft) and 1,875 m (6,152 ft) in the Andohahela National Park. The presence of the fossa at these locations indicates its ability to adapt to various elevations, consistent with its reported distribution in all Madagascar forest types.

== Behavior ==
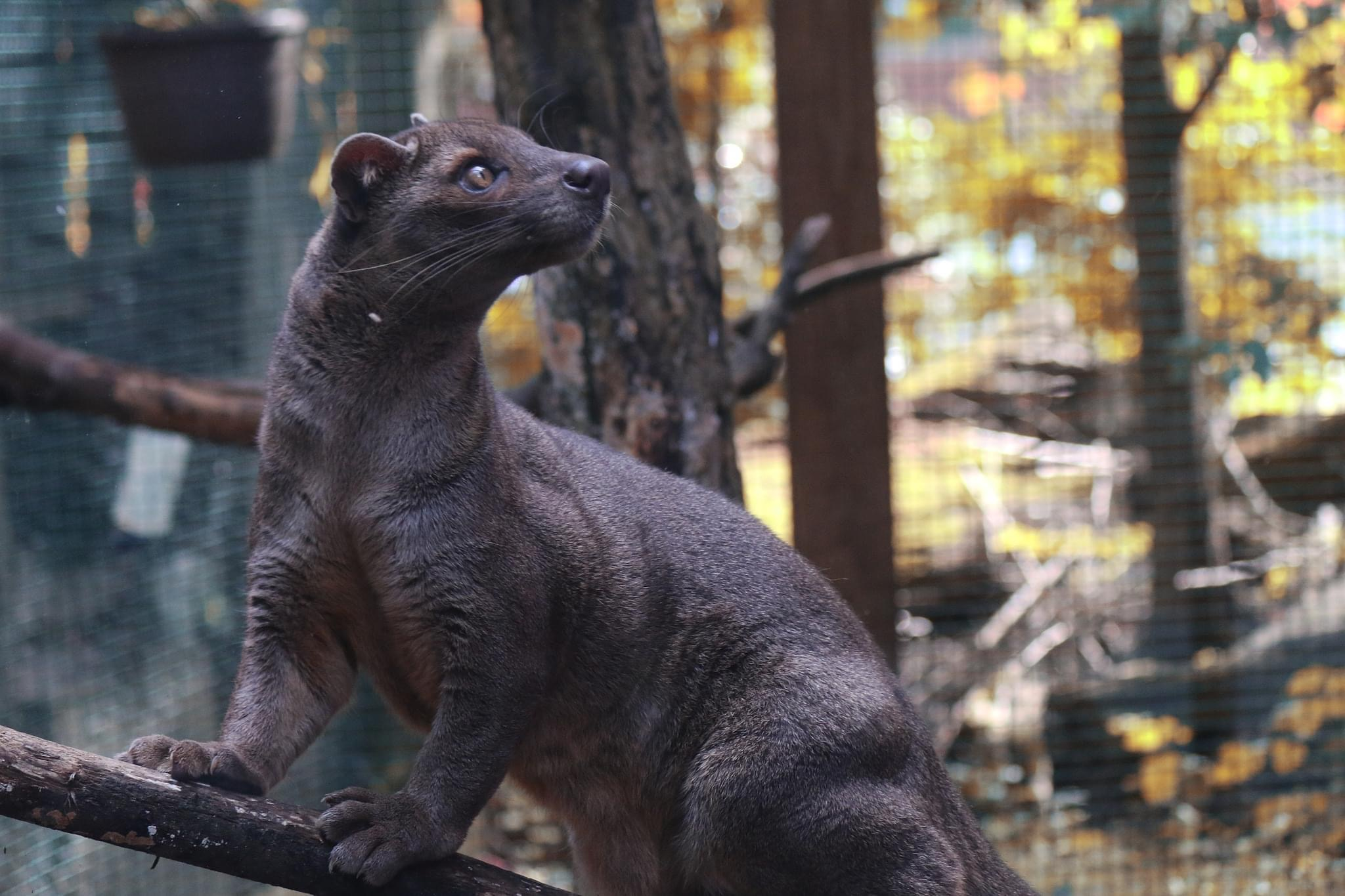
Fossa are active both day and night (cathemeral).

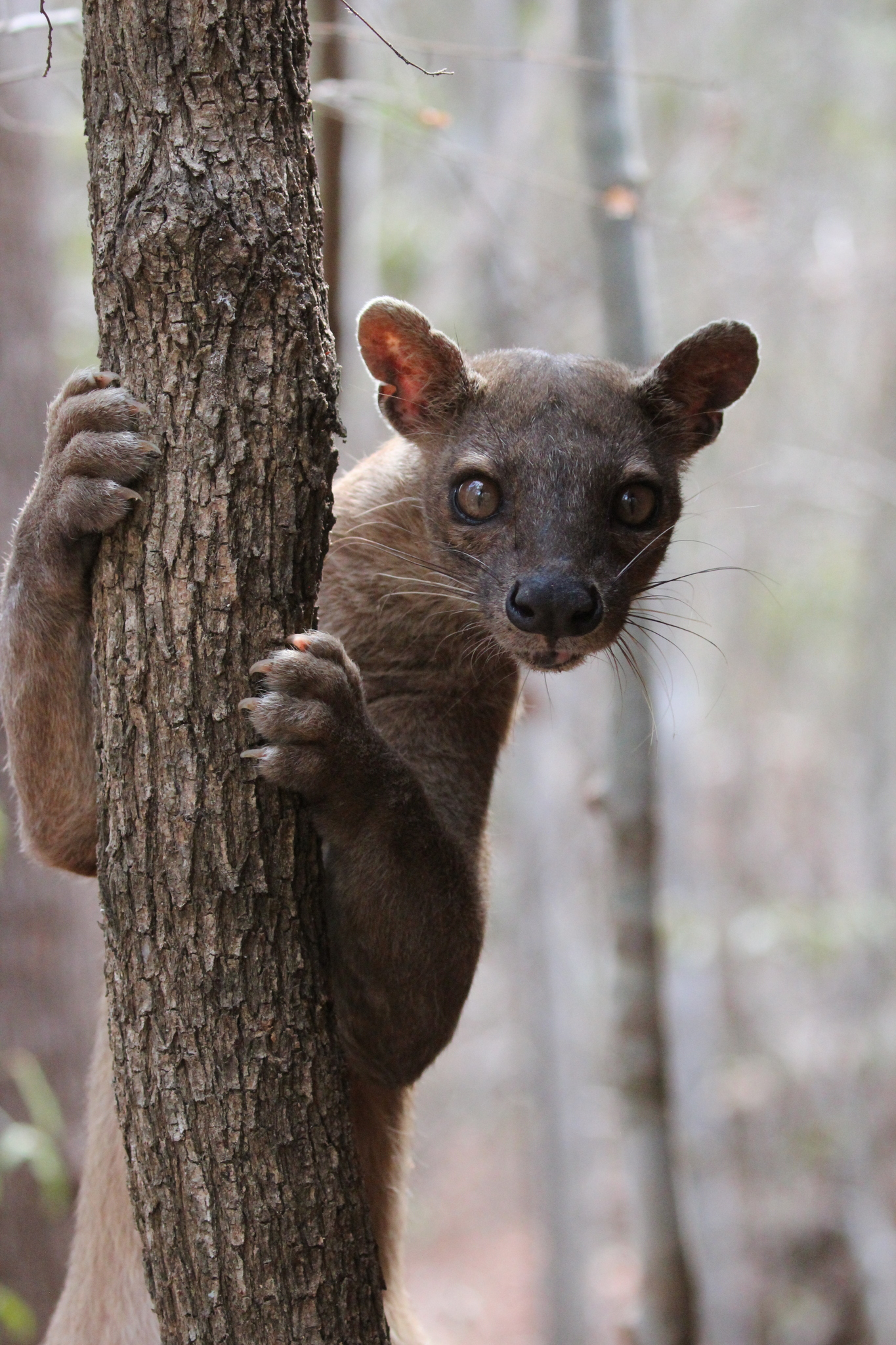
Climbing a tree

The fossa is active during both the day and the night and is considered cathemeral; activity peaks may occur early in the morning, late in the afternoon, and late in the night. The animal generally does not reuse sleeping sites, but females with young do return to the same den. The home ranges of male fossas in Kirindy Forest are up to 26 km^{2} (10 sq mi) large, compared to 13 km^{2} (5.0 sq mi) for females. These ranges overlap—by about 30 percent according to data from the eastern forests—but females usually have separated ranges. Home ranges grow during the dry season, perhaps because less food and water is available. In general, radio-collared fossas travel between 2 and 5 kilometres (1.2 and 3.1 mi) per day, although in one reported case a fossa was observed moving a straight-line distance of 7 km (4.3 mi) in 16 hours.

The animal's population density appears to be low: in Kirindy Forest, where it is thought to be common, its density has been estimated at one animal per 4 km^{2} (1.5 sq mi) in 1998. Another study in the same forest between 1994 and 1996 using the mark and recapture method indicated a population density of one animal per 3.8 km^{2} (1.5 sq mi) and one adult per 5.6 km^{2} (2.2 sq mi).

Except for mothers with young and occasional observations of pairs of males, animals are usually found alone, so that the species is considered solitary. A 2009 publication, however, reported a detailed observation of cooperative hunting, wherein three male fossas hunted a 3 kg (6.6 lb) sifaka (Propithecus verreauxi) for 45 minutes, and subsequently shared the prey. This behavior may be a vestige of cooperative hunting that would have been required to take down larger recently extinct lemurs.

Fossas communicate using sounds, scents, and visual signals. Vocalizations include purring, a threatening call, and a call of fear, consisting of "repeated loud, coarse inhalations and gasps of breath". A long, high yelp may function to attract other fossas. Females mew during mating and males produce a sigh when they have found a female. Throughout the year, animals produce long-lasting scent marks on rocks, trees, and the ground using glands in the anal region and on the chest. They also communicate using face and body expression, but the significance of these signals is uncertain. The animal is aggressive only during mating, and males in particular fight boldly. After a short fight, the loser flees and is followed by the winner for a short distance. In captivity, fossas are usually not aggressive and sometimes even allow themselves to be stroked by a zookeeper, but adult males in particular may try to bite.

=== Diet ===
The fossa is a carnivore that hunts small to medium-sized animals. One of eight carnivorous species endemic to Madagascar, the fossa is the island's largest surviving endemic terrestrial mammal and the only predator capable of preying upon adults of all extant lemur species, the largest of which can weigh as much as 90 percent of the weight of the average fossa. Although it is the predominant predator of lemurs, reports of its dietary habits demonstrate a wide variety of prey selectivity and specialization depending on habitat and season; diet does not vary by sex. While the fossa is thought to be a lemur specialist in Ranomafana National Park, its diet is more variable in other rain forest habitats.

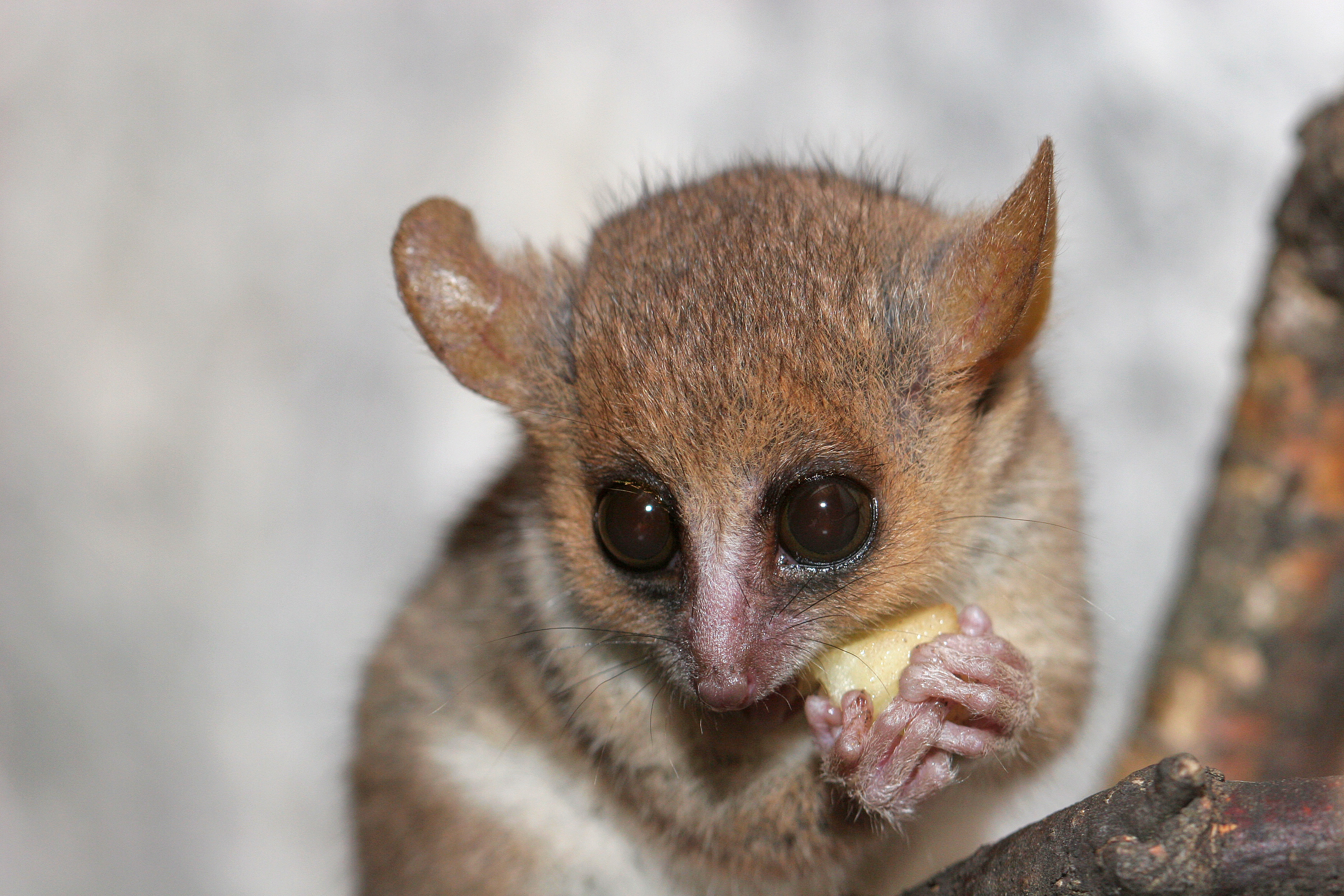

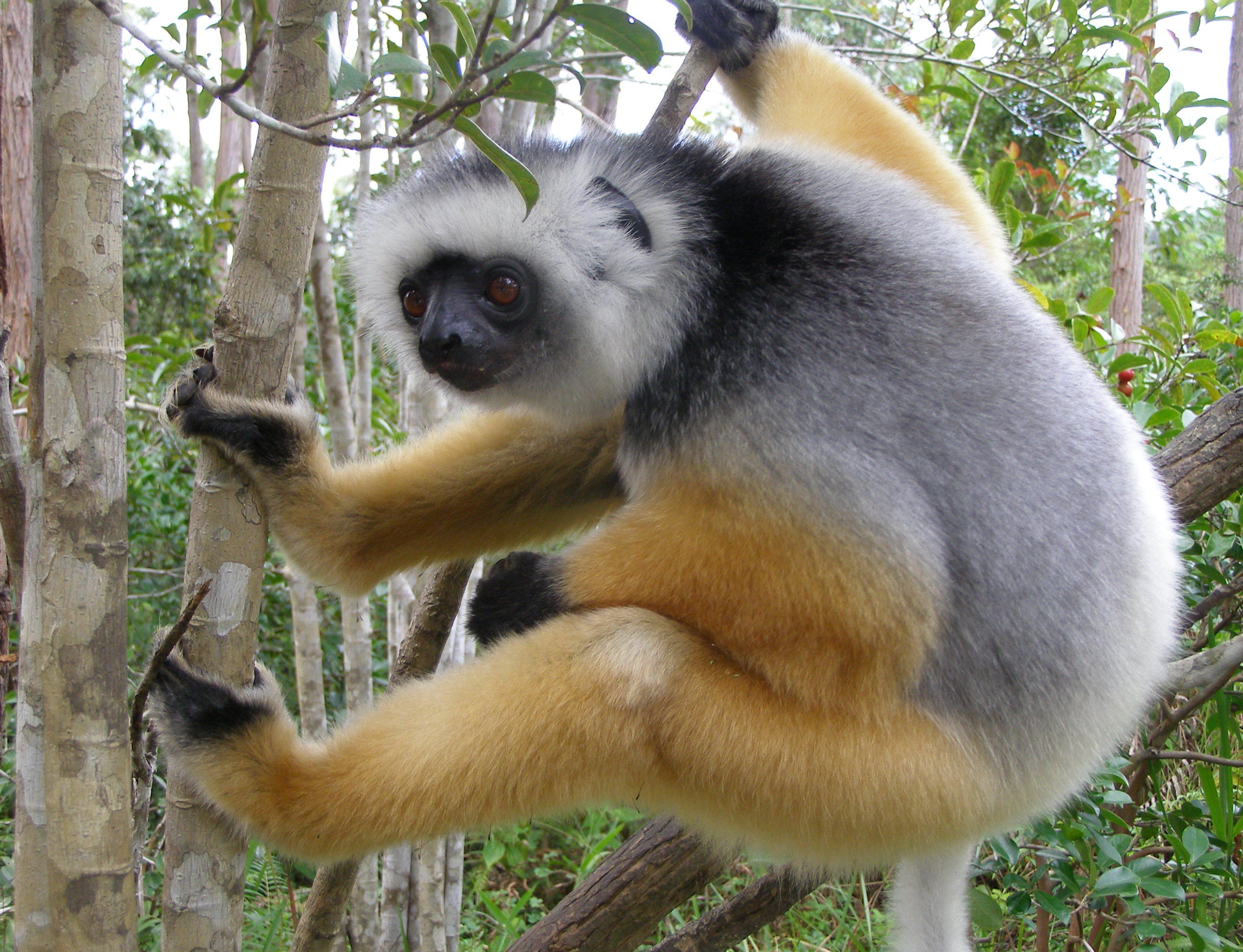
The fossa's diet includes small- (gray mouse lemur, above) to medium-sized (diademed sifaka, below) mammals.

The diet of the fossa in the wild has been studied by analyzing their distinctive scats, which resemble gray cylinders with twisted ends and measure 10–14 cm (3.9–5.5 in) long by 1.5–2.5 cm (0.6–1.0 in) thick. Scat collected and analyzed from both Andohahela and Andringitra contained lemur matter and rodents. Eastern populations in Andringitra incorporate the widest recorded variety of prey, including both vertebrates and invertebrates. Vertebrates consumed ranged from reptiles to a wide variety of birds, including both understory and ground birds, and mammals, including insectivores, rodents, and lemurs. Invertebrates eaten by the fossa in the high mountain zone of Andringitra include insects and crabs. One study found that vertebrates comprised 94% of the diet of fossas, with lemurs comprising over 50%, followed by tenrecs (9%), lizards (9%), and birds (2%). Seeds, which comprised 5% of the diet, may have been in the stomachs of the lemurs eaten, or may have been consumed with fruit taken for water, as seeds were more common in the stomach in the dry season. The average prey size varies geographically; it is only 40 grams (1.4 oz) in the high mountains of Andringitra, in contrast to 480 grams (17 oz) in humid forests and over 1,000 grams (35 oz) in dry deciduous forests. In a study of fossa diet in the dry deciduous forest of western Madagascar, more than 90% of prey items were vertebrates, and more than 50% were lemurs. The primary diet consisted of approximately six lemur species and two or three spiny tenrec species, along with snakes and small mammals. Generally, the fossa preys upon larger lemurs and rodents in preference to smaller ones.

Prey is obtained by hunting either on the ground or in the trees. During the non-breeding season the fossa hunts individually, but during the breeding season hunting parties may be seen, and these may be pairs or later on mothers and young. One member of the group scales a tree and chases the lemurs from tree to tree, forcing them down to the ground where the other is easily able to capture them. The fossa is known to eviscerate its larger lemur prey, a trait that, along with its distinct scat, helps identify its kills. Long-term observations of the fossa's predation patterns on rainforest sifakas suggest that the fossa hunts in a subsection of their range until prey density is decreased, then moves on. The fossa has been reported to prey on domestic animals, such as goats and small calves, and especially chickens. Food taken in captivity includes amphibians, birds, insects, reptiles, and small- to medium-sized mammals.

This wide variety of prey items taken in various rainforest habitats is similar to the varied dietary composition noted occurring in the dry forests of western Madagascar, as well. As the largest endemic predator on Madagascar, this dietary flexibility combined with a flexible activity pattern has allowed it to exploit a wide variety of niches available throughout the island, making it a potential keystone species for the Madagascar ecosystems.

=== Breeding ===
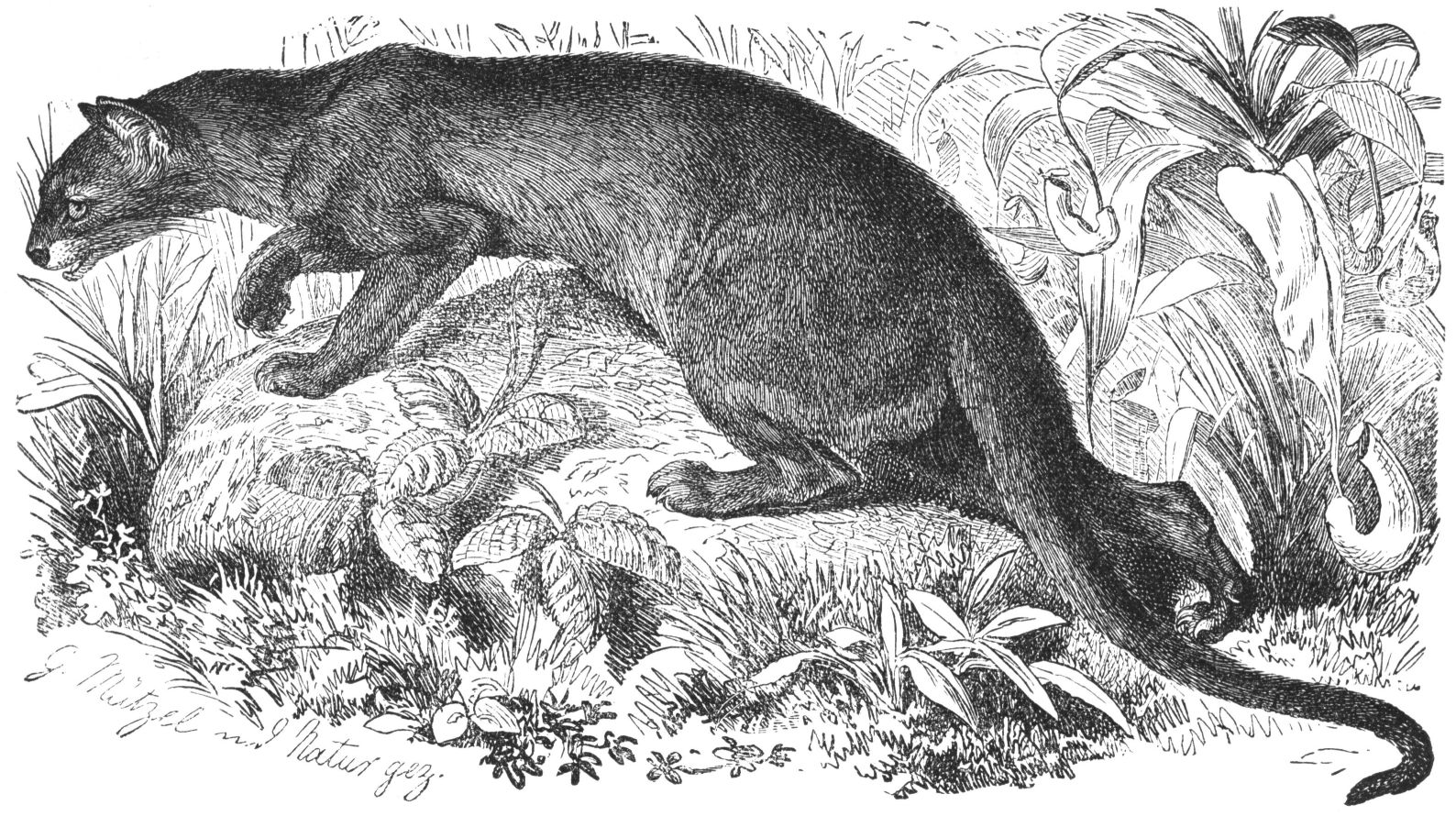
Fossa illustration circa 1927

Fossas have a polyandrous mating system. Most of the details of reproduction in wild populations are from the western dry deciduous forests; determining whether certain of these details are applicable to eastern populations will require further field research. Mating typically occurs during September and October, although there are reports of its occurring as late as December, and can be highly conspicuous. In captivity in the Northern Hemisphere, fossas instead mate in the northern spring, from March to July. Intromission usually occurs in trees on horizontal limbs about 20 m (66 ft) off the ground. Frequently the same tree is used year after year, with remarkable precision as to the date the season commences. Trees are often near a water source, and have limbs strong enough and wide enough to support the mating pair, about 20 cm (7.9 in) wide. Some mating has been reported on the ground as well.

As many as eight males will be at a mating site, staying in close vicinity to the receptive female. The female seems to choose the male she mates with, and the males compete for the attention of the female with a significant amount of vocalization and antagonistic interactions. The female may choose to mate with several of the males, and her choice of mate does not seem to have any correlation to the physical appearance of the males. To stimulate the male to mount her, she gives a series of mewling vocalizations. The male mounts from behind, resting his body on her slightly off-center, a position requiring delicate balance; if the female were to stand, the male would have significant difficulty continuing. He places his paws on her shoulders or grasps her around the waist and often licks her neck. Mating may last for nearly three hours. This unusually lengthy mating is due to the physical nature of the male's erect penis, which has backwards-pointing spines along most of its length.

Fossa mating includes a copulatory tie, which may be enforced by the male's spiny penis. The tie is difficult to break if the mating session is interrupted. Copulation with a single male may be repeated several times, with a total mating time of up to fourteen hours, while the male may remain with the female for up to an hour after the mating. A single female may occupy the tree for up to a week, mating with multiple males over that time. Also, other females may take her place, mating with some of the same males as well as others. This mating strategy, whereby the females monopolize a site and maximize the available number of mates, seems to be unique among carnivores. Recent research suggests that this system helps the fossa overcome factors which would normally impede mate-finding, such as low population density and lack of den use.

The birthing of the litter of one to six (typically two to four) takes place in a concealed location, such as an underground den, a termite mound, a rock crevice, or in the hollow of a large tree (particularly those of the genus Commiphora). Contrary to older research, litters are of mixed sexes. Young are born in December or January, making the gestation period 90 days, with the late mating reports indicating a gestational period of about six to seven weeks. The newborns are blind and toothless and weigh no more than 100 g (3.5 oz). The fur is thin and has been described as gray-brown or nearly white. After about two weeks the cubs' eyes open, they become more active, and their fur darkens to a pearl gray. The cubs do not take solid food until three months old, and do not leave the den until they are 4.5 months old; they are weaned shortly after that. After the first year, the juveniles are independent of their mother. Permanent teeth appear at 18 to 20 months. Physical maturity is reached by about two years of age, but sexual maturity is not attained for another year or two, and the young may stay with their mother until they are fully mature. Lifespan in captivity is up to or past 20 years of age, possibly due to the slow juvenile development.

Young fossas may fall prey to large snakes or birds of prey.

== Human interactions ==
The fossa has been assessed as "Vulnerable" by the IUCN Red List since 2008, as its population size has probably declined by at least 30 percent between 1987 and 2008; previous assessments have included "Endangered" (2000) and "Insufficiently Known" (1988, 1990, 1994). The species is dependent on forest and thus threatened by the widespread destruction of Madagascar's native forest but is also able to persist in disturbed areas. A suite of microsatellite markers (short segments of DNA that have a repeated sequence) have been developed to help aid in studies of genetic health and population dynamics of both captive and wild fossas. Several pathogens have been isolated from the fossa, some of which, such as anthrax and canine distemper, are thought to have been transmitted by feral dogs or cats. Toxoplasma gondii was reported in a captive fossa in 2013.

Although the species is widely distributed, it is locally rare in all regions, making fossas particularly vulnerable to extinction. The effects of habitat fragmentation increase the risk. For its size, the fossa has a lower than predicted population density, which is further threatened by Madagascar's rapidly disappearing forests and dwindling populations of lemurs, which make up a high proportion of its diet. The loss of the fossa, either locally or completely, could significantly impact ecosystem dynamics, possibly leading to over-grazing by some of its prey species. The total population of the fossa living within protected areas is estimated at about 2,500. Specific estimates were 2,600-8,600 total individuals (2016), and 2,635 in protected reserves (2012).

Only two protected areas are thought to contain 500 or more adult fossas: Masoala National Park and Midongy-Sud National Park, although these are also thought to be overestimated. Too little population information has been collected for a formal population viability analysis, but estimates suggest that none of the protected areas support a viable population. If this is correct, the extinction of the fossa may take as much as 100 years to occur as the species gradually declines. In order for the species to survive, it is estimated that at least 555 km^{2} (214 sq mi) is needed to maintain smaller, short-term viable populations, and at least 2,000 km^{2} (770 sq mi) for populations of 500 adults.

Taboo, known in Madagascar as fady, offers protection for the fossa and other carnivores. In the Marolambo District (part of the Atsinanana region in Toamasina Province), the fossa has traditionally been hated and feared as a dangerous animal. It has been described as "greedy and aggressive", known for taking fowl and piglets, and believed to "take little children who walk alone into the forest". Some do not eat it for fear that it will transfer its undesirable qualities to anyone who consumes it. However, the animal is also taken for bushmeat; a study published in 2009 reported that 57 percent of villages (8 of 14 sampled) in the Makira forest consume fossa meat. The animals were typically hunted using slingshots, with dogs, or most commonly, by placing snare traps on animal paths. Near Ranomafana National Park, the fossa, along with several of its smaller cousins and the introduced small Indian civet (Viverricula indica), are known to "scavenge on the bodies of ancestors", which are buried in shallow graves in the forest. For this reason, eating these animals is strictly prohibited by fady. However, if they wander into villages in search of domestic fowl, they may be killed or trapped. Small carnivore traps have been observed near chicken runs in the village of Vohiparara. Retaliatory killing of fossas in response to their predation on coops is common as well; people with an educational attainment were more likely to dislike fossas, and those that disliked fossas were more likely to report having killed one.

Fossas are occasionally held in captivity in zoos. They first bred in captivity in 1974 in the zoo of Montpellier, France. The next year, at a time when there were only eight fossas in the world's zoos, the Duisburg Zoo in Germany acquired one; this zoo later started a successful breeding program, and most zoo fossas now descend from the Duisburg population. Research on the Duisburg fossas has provided much data about their biology. As of 2018, 117 individuals were known to be held at 47 zoological institutions around the world.

The fossa was depicted as an antagonist in the 2005 DreamWorks animated film Madagascar, being referred to as the "foosa", and accurately shown as the lemurs' most feared predator.
