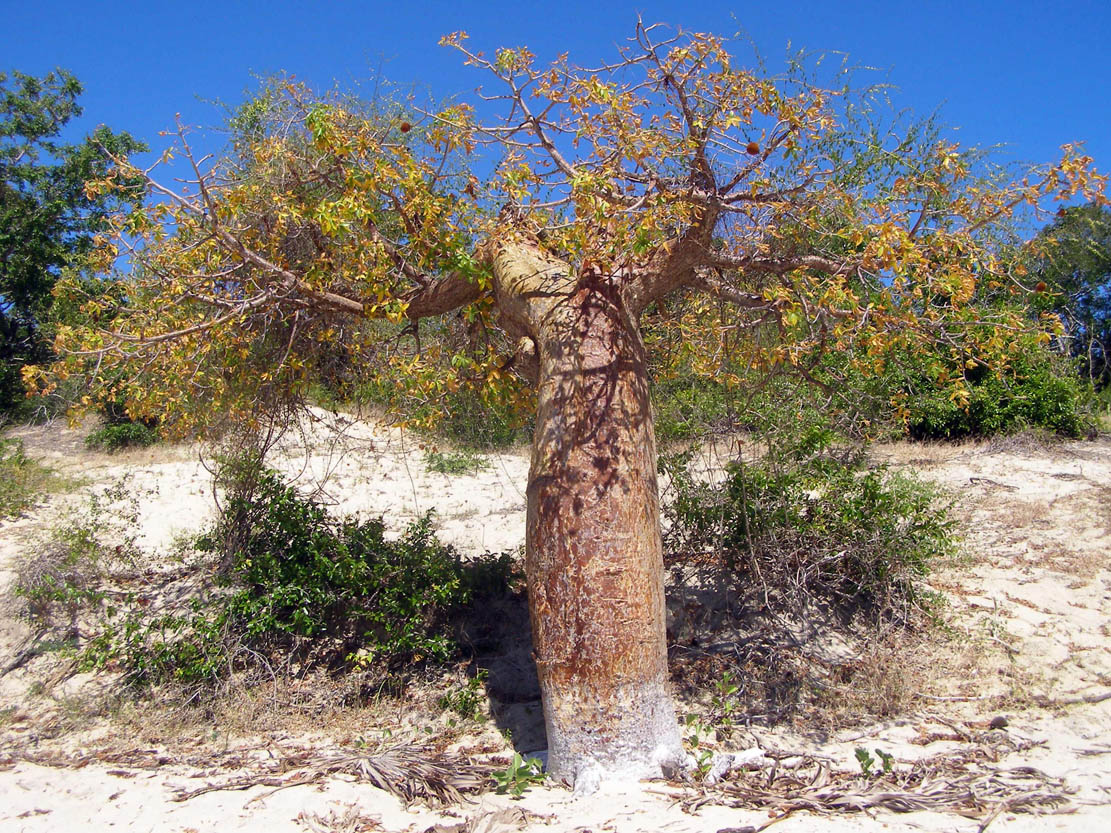
- A. rubrostipa in the Anjajavy Forest

Conservation status
- Least Concern (IUCN 3.1)

Scientific classification
- Kingdom: Plantae
- Clade: Embryophytes
- Clade: Tracheophytes
- Clade: Spermatophytes
- Clade: Angiosperms
- Clade: Eudicots
- Clade: Rosids
- Order: Malvales
- Family: Malvaceae
- Genus: Adansonia
- Species: A. rubrostipa

Binomial name
- Adansonia rubrostipa Jum. & H.Perrier

= Adansonia rubrostipa =

Fony baobab

Species of flowering plant

Adansonia rubrostipa, commonly known as fony baobab, is a deciduous tree in the Malvaceae family. Of eight species of baobab currently recognized, six are indigenous to Madagascar, including fony baobab. It is endemic to western Madagascar, found in Baie de Baly National Park, south. It is associated with well-drained soils and is found in dry and spiny forests. It occurs in the following protected areas: Amoron'i Onilahy, Baie de Baly, Menabe Antimena, Mikea, Namoroka, Ranobe PK 32, Tsimanampesotse, Tsimembo Manambolomaty, Tsinjoriake (La Table/St Augustin).

Fony baobab is the smallest of the baobabs, easily identified by its distinctive reddish bark. It is usually bottle-shaped and has toothed leaves and round fruit. It was first described by H.Perrier de la Bathie in 1909.

== Description ==
=== General ===
This is a small to large deciduous tree 4–5 metres (13–16 ft) tall with reddish brown, peeling bark. The trunk is usually a distinctive bottle shape. Main branches are often horizontal, then curving upward toward the tips. Branches sometimes have spines on the upper surface.

=== Leaves ===
Leaves are present from November to April and are made up of 3-5 stalkless (sessile) leaflets with finely toothed edges (teeth about 1 millimetre (0.039 in) long). Most baobab species have untoothed leaves.

=== Flowers ===
Flowers are large, showy and highly scented. They emerge when in the trees are in leaf, usually from February to April. Flower buds are 16–28 centimetres (6.3–11.0 in) long and cylindrical, set on a green, 1–2.5 centimetres (0.39–0.98 in) long stalk. The outer part of the perianth, the calyx, is made up of yellowish green lobes with faint reddish stripes. As the flower opens, the calyx lobes fold back and become twisted tightly at the base of the flower. The petals are bright yellow to orange-yellow, spreading, long and narrow but with expanded overlapping bases. Inside the petals is a pale yellow staminal tube (a tube made up of fused stamens) up to 10 centimetres (3.9 in) long and 1–1.2 centimetres (0.39–0.47 in) in diameter. Set at the top of the staminal tube are 100-150 filaments 10–12 centimetres (3.9–4.7 in) long, the outer unfused. The inner 10-20 filaments are erect and united into a central bundle that extends for about 6 centimetres (2.4 in) beyond the top of the tube. This central bundle of fused filaments set above the staminal tube is an identifying feature of fony baobab. In the very centre of the flower is an ovary, covered with dense golden hairs, with a pink 20–25 centimetres (7.9–9.8 in) long style topped by a red stigma that blackens with age. Flowers open around dusk. They take less than 30 minutes to open and have a very short reproductive phase. Pollen is released the first night and the stigmas shrivel by morning. Pollinators include the long-tongued hawkmoth Coelonia solani.

=== Fruit ===
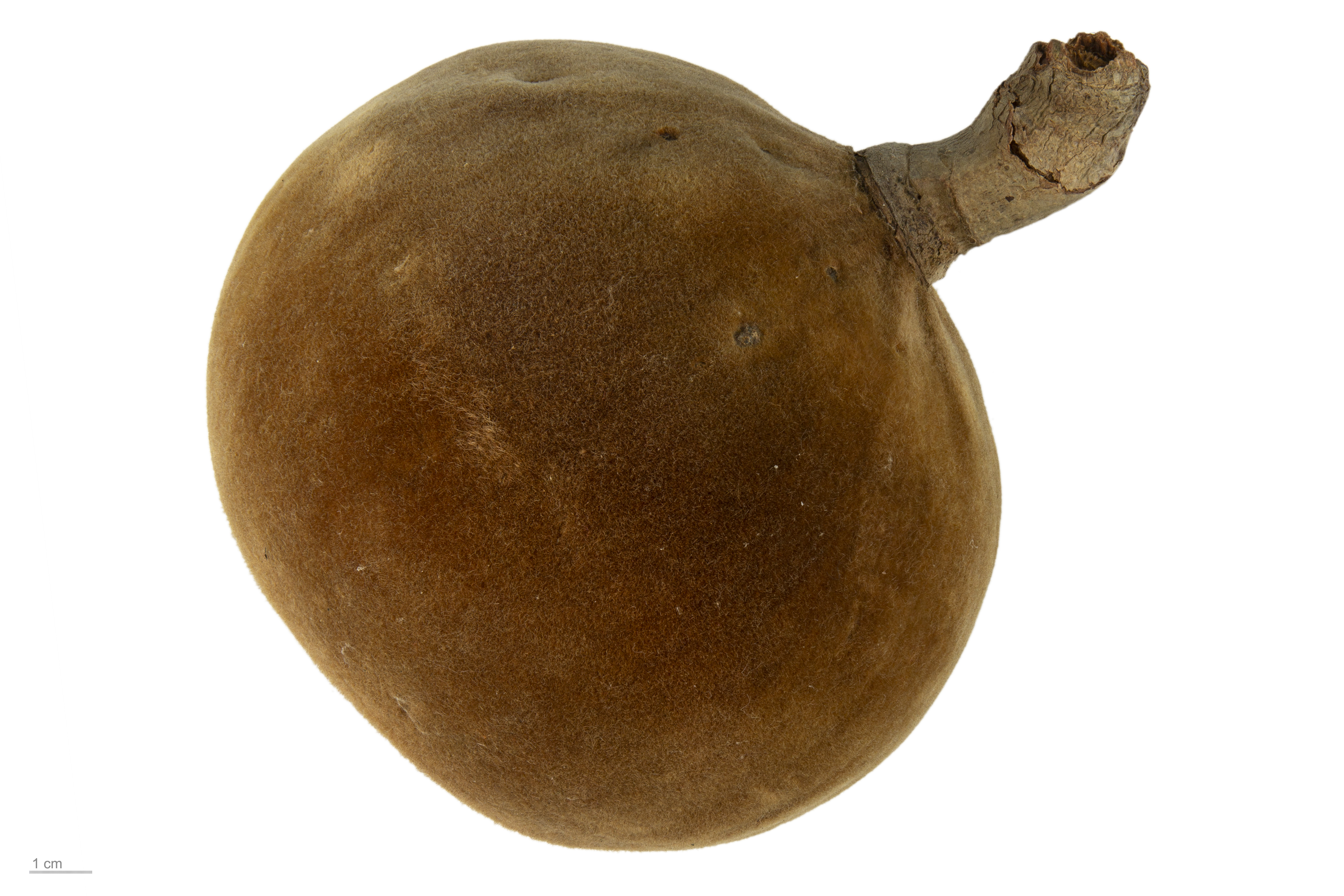
Adansonia rubrostipa (MHNT)

Ripe fruit of fony baobab can be found October to November. Fruits are rounded with a 4–5 millimetres (0.16–0.20 in) thick shell (pericarp) with dense reddish-brown hairs. Seeds are kidney-shaped (reniform).

== Taxonomy ==
Plants of the World considers Adansonia fony Baill. to be the accepted name for a broader taxon which includes two varieties: Adansonia fony var. fony and Adansonia fony var. rubrostipa (Jum. & H.Perrier).

== Habitat ==
Fony baobab is associated with well drained, dry habitats on calcareous soils. It is found in dry deciduous forests and the Madagascar spiny forests of western Madagascar and is an important component of the spiny thickets or "spiny desert" of southern Madagascar, a globally distinctive ecoregion.

== Threats ==
Habitat loss and forest destruction are the chief threats, but population trends are unknown. Forests are logged for timber and charcoal production or cleared for mining or urbanization. Grazing may disturb baobab seedlings.

== Notable individuals ==
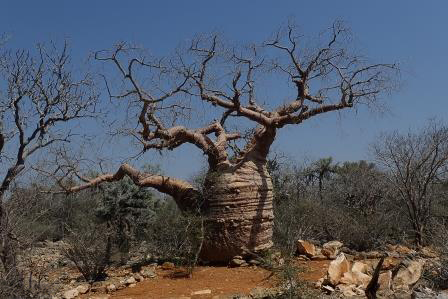
"Grandmother" Fony baobab

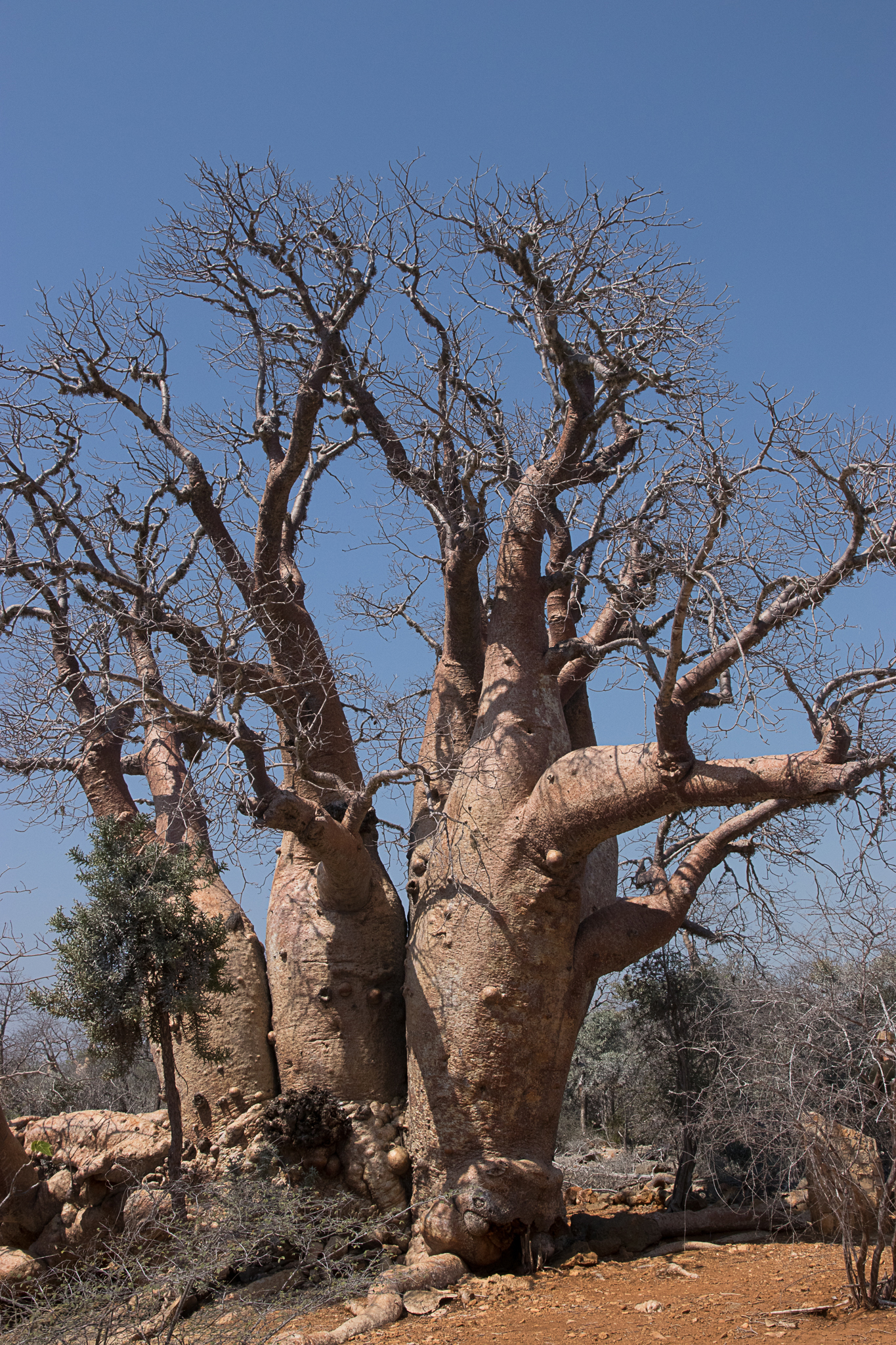
"Polygamous" Fony baobab

Two large fony baobabs growing in Tsimanampetsotse National Park were studied using radiocarbon dating. One called "Grandmother" is made up of 3 fused trunks of different ages, with the oldest part of the tree an estimated 1,600 years old. The second, "polygamous baobab", has six fused stems, and is an estimated 1,000 years old.

== Uses ==
Roots, seeds and fruits are reportedly edible. Wood of fire-killed trees may be used as thatching material and in some areas trees are cut and used for charcoal production.

== See also ==
- Adansonia madagascariensis
- Tsingy
