= Tsitakakantsa =

Oldest Baobab tree in Madagascar

Tsitakakantsa is the oldest Baobab tree in Madagascar. It is located in the Andombiry Forest. Like many other ancient trees, at over 1,000 years old.

The tree has central cultural significance for the residents of the nearby village of Andombiry. Following the death of another baobab, Tsitakakoike, in 2018, itself being estimated to be 1,000 to 1,500 years old, the residents chose Tsitakakantsa as its spiritual successor.

The tree has shown signs of decay and death since August 2025, likely driven by a fungal infection. By May 2026, half of the tree had fallen, and mold was present within the wood.
