= Madagascar dry deciduous forests =

Tropical dry forest ecoregion in Madagascar

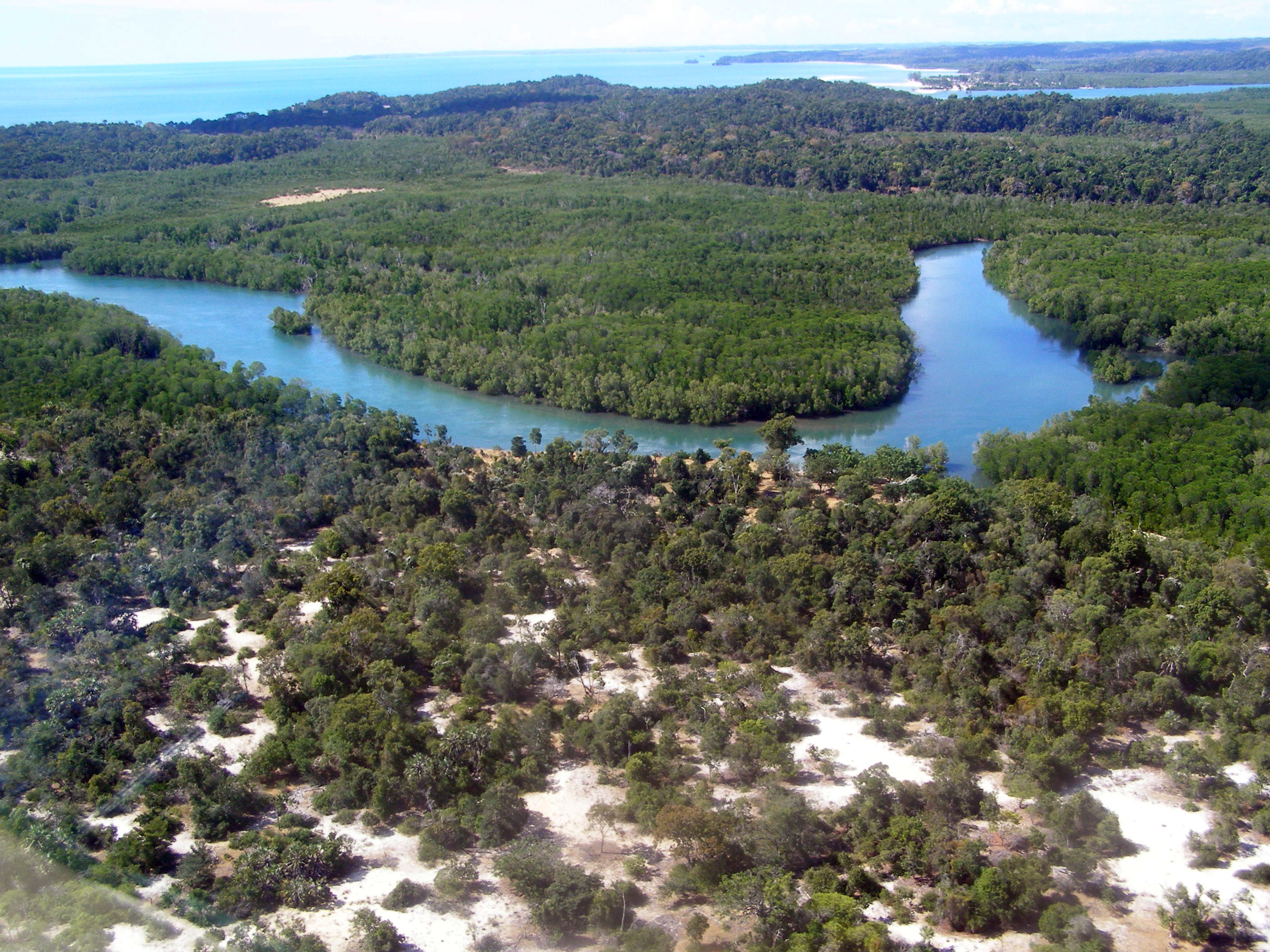
- A portion of Anjajavy Forest, inset by a swath of mangrove forest

Ecology
- Realm: Afrotropic
- Biome: Tropical and subtropical dry broadleaf forests
- Borders: Madagascar subhumid forests, Madagascar succulent woodlands, Madagascar mangroves
- Animals: Madagascar sideneck turtle, ploughshare tortoise, rhinoceros chameleon, Uroplatus guentheri
- Bird species: Bernier's teal, Madagascar fish eagle, Sakalava rail
- Mammal species: Golden-crowned sifaka, mongoose lemur, golden-brown mouse lemur

Geography
- Area: 152,100 km^{2} (58,700 sq mi)
- Country: Madagascar
- Elevation: 0–600 metres (0–1,969 ft)
- Coordinates: 17°36′S 45°12′E
- Geology: varied
- Climate type: Tropical savanna climate (Aw)

Conservation
- Conservation status: Critical/Endangered
- Global 200: included
- Protected: 5.79%

The Madagascar dry deciduous forests represent a tropical dry forest ecoregion situated in the western and northern part of Madagascar. The area has high numbers of endemic plant and animal species but has suffered large-scale clearance for agriculture. They are among the world's richest and most distinctive dry forests and included in the Global 200 ecoregions by the World Wide Fund. The area is also home to distinctive limestone karst formations known as tsingy, including the World Heritage Site of Bemaraha.

== Geography ==
There are two separate areas within the ecoregion: the western side of Madagascar from the Ampasindava peninsula in the north to Belo-sur-Tsiribihina and Maromandia in the south (this is most of Mahajanga Province); and the northern tip of the island (apart from the high areas of Amber Mountain). Geological substrate is varied and includes the tsingy limestone massifs.

These dry deciduous forests span the coastal plain with its limestone plateaus emanating virtually at sea level to higher altitudes to roughly 600 metres (2,000 ft). The area includes wetlands and grasslands (mostly created by forest clearance for agriculture) as well as dry forests characterized by a deciduous canopy extending to a height of 10 to 15 metres (33 to 49 ft).

Climate is tropical, with summer daytime temperatures commonly exceeding 30 °C (86 °F), and a wet season between October and April. Rainfall, ranging from 1,000 to 1,500 mm, is more abundant than in the spiny thickets and succulent woodlands, but lower than in the eastern lowland rainforests.

== Flora ==
While the absolute number of plant species is lower than in the eastern rainforests of the island, the dry deciduous forests of Madagascar have a higher ratio of endemic species. Trees have adapted to the dry climate by shedding leaves in the dry winter season to limit evapotranspiration. Moreover, some species like baobabs and Moringa have adapted by evolving the ability to store copious water in their large bulbous trunks. Four species of baobabs, including three endemics (Adansonia grandidieri, A. madagascariensis and A. suarezensis) occur in this ecoregion. Other notable tree species include flamboyant tree (Delonix regia), Pachypodium species, and several Fabaceae and Rubiaceae. Forest understory plants include Lissochilus orchids such as Oeceoclades calcarata, a large, cool growing, showy, terrestrial orchid which grows at medium elevation (1000 to 2000 meters) in western Madagascar. Its habitat is semi-arid and it is found growing in sandy or rocky soils in dry moss and lichen forests.

== Fauna ==
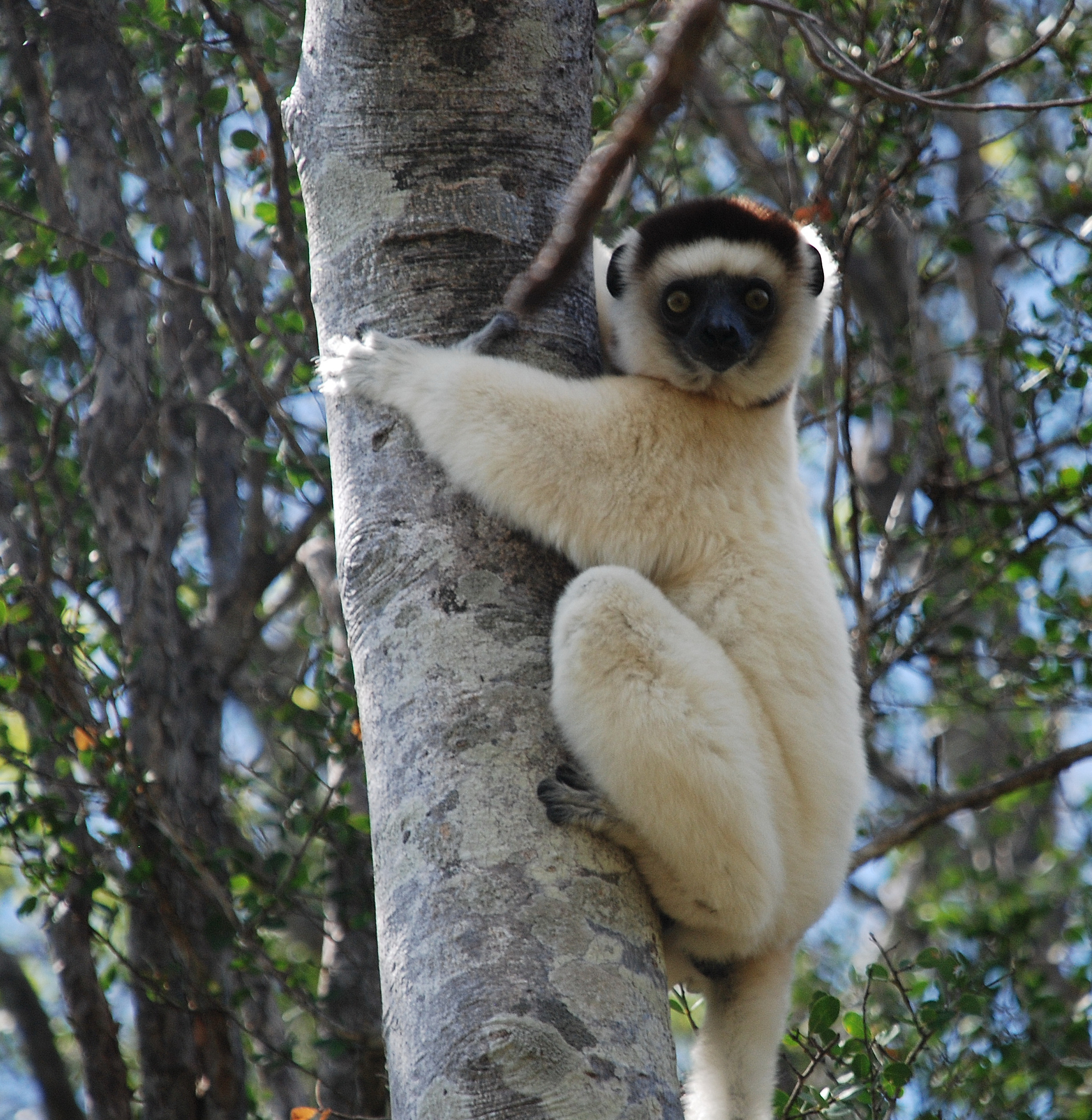
Verreaux's sifaka

One characteristic in common with other tropical and subtropical dry broadleaf forests is the presence of relatively high densities of mammalian biomass. Several of Madagascar's characteristic lemur species are found here including the fat-tailed dwarf lemur, five subspecies of Propithecus, three species of Lepilemur, and five species of Microcebus. Endemic mammals include three endangered species, golden-crowned sifaka (Propithecus tattersalli) and Perrier's sifaka (Propithecus diadema perrieri) and western forest rat (Nesomys lambertoni) as well as mongoose lemur (Eulemur mongoz), golden-brown mouse lemur (Microcebus ravelobensis), northern rufous mouse lemur (M. tavaratra), pygmy mouse lemur (M. myoxinus), Milne-Edwards' sportive lemur (Lepilemur edwardsi), and greater big-footed mouse (Macrotarsomys ingens). As well as lemurs the dry forests are home to the island's largest predator, the fossa (Cryptoprocta ferox) and some smaller carnivorans.

The lakes and rivers of the dry forest region are homes to most of Madagascar's bird species. Among reptiles, many chameleon and gecko species occur here, as well as the Madagascar sideneck turtle and the critically endangered ploughshare tortoise.

== Threats and conservation ==
Most dry forests have already been destroyed by human action, especially near the Central Highlands. The remaining forest is severely fragmented. Burning, grazing, and logging are the major threats, and siltation, overfishing and invasive species impact the wetlands. Some species such as lemurs suffer from hunting.

5.79% of the ecoregion is in protected areas. They include:

- Ankarafantsika National Park
- Baie de Baly National Park
- Bemaraha National Park
- Montagne d'Ambre National Park
- Namoroka National Park
- Tsingy de Bemaraha Strict Nature Reserve
- Ambohijanahary Reserve
- Analamerana Special Reserve
- Ankarana Special Reserve
- Bemarivo Reserve
- Bora Reserve
- Kasijy Special Reserve
- Maningoza Reserve
- Manongarivo Reserve
- Tampoketsa Analamaitso Special Reserve

== Particular localities ==
=== Ankarana Special Reserve ===
The Ankarana Massif consists of a limestone shelf which imposes a picturesque land-form on the few adventurers who find this remote forest. As the limestone has weathered over geologic time, this karst formation often exhibits spiry pinnacles, called "tsingy" locally. The name derives from the Malagasy word which means "walk on tiptoe", used by the earliest settlers from around 1500 years ago to describe the sharpness of the rugged limestone shelves. There are an abundance of limestone caves and virgin forests that shelter the diverse wildlife of the Ankarana region. In places the cave roofs have collapsed to form isolated forests and the vegetation of the gorges is also protected by the topography. Subterranean rivers provide a natural perennial irrigation system.

The Ankarana Special Reserve is one of the northernmost reaches of the Madagascar dry deciduous forests, and is very hot from December through March with this equatorial proximity. Access to wildlife viewing is through strenuous hiking, given the elevation differences, complex terrain and heat, but four-wheel drive vehicles can reach most of the actual campsites. Below the massif, and to the west, is a grassy savannah-with-palms that leads to the Indian Ocean. Within the massif, Lac Vert is found among tsingy formations.

Mammals found in this forest include the apex predator fossa (Cryptoprocta ferox), the fanaloka (Fossa fossana), northern ring-tailed mongoose and numerous bat species. Lemurs occurring here include the crowned lemur, northern sportive lemur, gray mouse lemur, Sanford's brown lemur and the aye-aye. Numerous geckos inhabit the reserve including the Henkel's leaf-tailed gecko, big-headed gecko and day gecko. Other local reptiles are the Madagascar ground boa, the white-lipped chameleon (Furcifer minor) and Oustalet's chameleon, the world's largest chameleon, which can attain 68 centimetres in length.

Some bird species commonly seen are the hook-billed vanga, Madagascar pygmy kingfisher, crested coua, white-breasted mesite and Madagascar ibis. Raptors sighted in the reserve include the Madagascar harrier-hawk and the Madagascar scops owl. Other avafauna occurring here include red-capped coua and Coquerel's coua, and the vangas Van Dam's vanga, rufous vanga and sickle-billed vanga. Vangas are significant in Madagascar, as 15 of the 16 vanga species are endemic to Madagascar. The greater vasa parrot and Madagascar green pigeon are also indigenous. An important endangered species, the Madagascar fish eagle, has a number of breeding pairs located in the Ankarana Reserve.

=== Anjajavy Forest ===
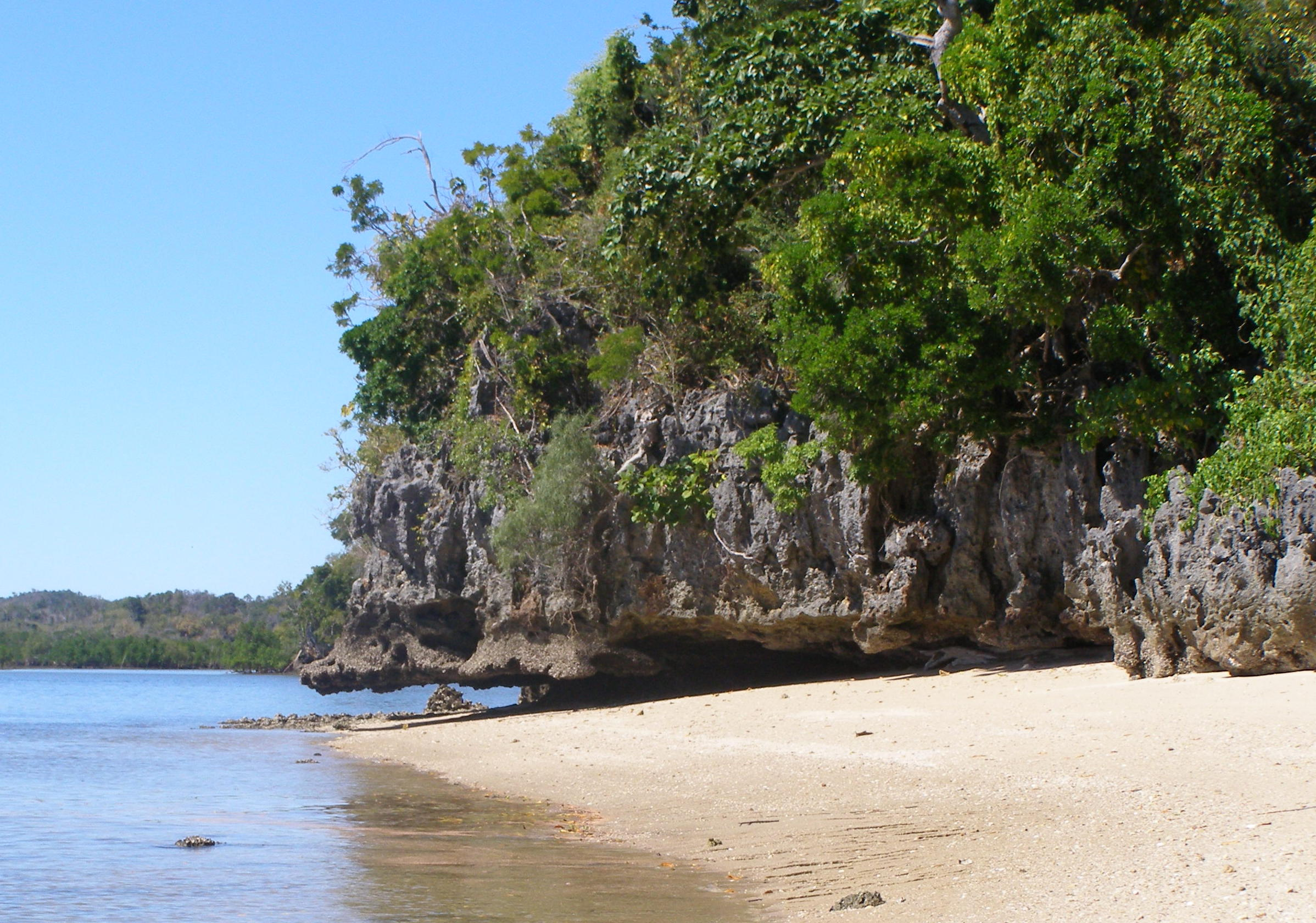
Anjajavy Forest on Tsingy rocks juts into the Indian Ocean.

Anjajavy Forest is an example of a purely lowland dry deciduous forest in northwest Madagascar. It is punctuated with numerous tsingy outcroppings and limestone karst caves, and in many locations abuts the Indian Ocean, especially where the dramatic tsingy formations jut out into the ocean. The canopy height is typically 15 to 25 meters high, and is at its lowest at the coastal verge, where growth may be impeded by saline rocky soils. The forest resides on a small peninsula of land poking into the Indian Ocean, that is bounded on the north and part of its eastern extent by the Bay of Narinda and on the south by the Bay of Majajamba. Access to this forest is difficult since there are no roads connecting this peninsula to the Madagascar highway system; however, arrival by sea and by air are accomplished with some effort.

In many places at the ocean edge as well as forest interior, several tree species are capable of taking root directly in the tsingy rocks. Several species of baobab and tamarind are among the tallest species forming the canopy. Considering the lower precipitation rates on the west coast (about 1,300 mm per annum at Anjajavy Forest), the vegetation is surprisingly verdant in the beginning of the dry season, but eventually will become mostly leafless by late winter. The forest understory is moderately dense but not impenetrable. Nor is the understory heavily thorned in most locations.

The Anjajavy Forest is named for a kind of Salvadora species, the jajavy tree, which might be endemic only to the forest itself. Abundant diurnal lemurs that are found here include the Coquerel's sifaka and the common brown lemur. Three nocturnal species of mouse lemur are seen, but their precise species are yet to be documented. A large variety of birds are present including the endangered Madagascar fish eagle, which has four (of the approximately 99 known) breeding pairs resident in Anjajavy Forest. Other birdlife present are the sacred ibis, crested coua, kingfishers and Madagascar wagtail. Butterflies include the magpie crow. Numerous lizards, chameleons and snakes populate the forest and are easily seen from the sparse trail network.

The dry forest is invaded by fingers of mangrove swamp in the form of riparian zones at several small coastal estuaries at the western verge of the Anjajavy Forest, where small tidal streams flow into the Indian Ocean. The species of the mangrove swamps are, of course, totally different from the dry forest, and the transition zone supports an interesting ecotone, providing unusual niches for several species of animals.

== See also ==
- Ecoregions of Madagascar
