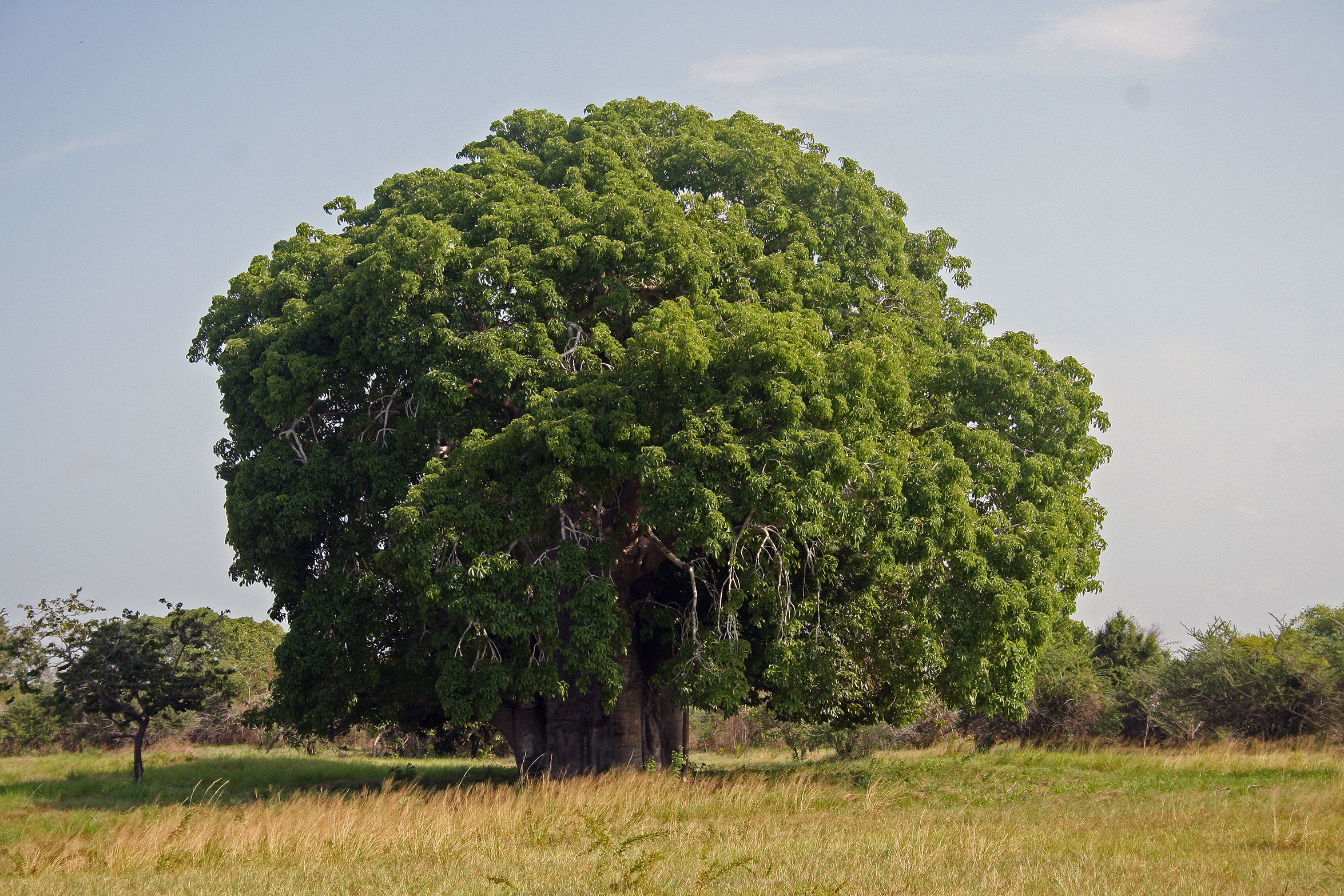
- Adansonia digitata in Tanzania

Scientific classification
- Kingdom: Plantae
- Clade: Tracheophytes
- Clade: Angiosperms
- Clade: Eudicots
- Clade: Rosids
- Order: Malvales
- Family: Malvaceae
- Subfamily: Bombacoideae
- Genus: Adansonia; L.

Species
- See species section

Synonyms
- Baobab Adans.; Baobabus Kuntze; Ophelus Lour.

= Adansonia =

Genus of trees known as baobab

Adansonia is a genus of medium-to-large deciduous trees known as baobabs ( /ˈbeɪ.oʊbæbz/; also UK: /ˈbɑː.oʊbæbz/, US: /ˈbaʊbæbz/) or boababs. The eight species of Adansonia are native to Africa, Australia, and Madagascar but have also been introduced to other regions of the world, including Barbados, where several of the baobabs there are suspected to have originated from Africa. Other baobabs have been introduced to Asia. A genomic and ecological analysis further suggests that the genus itself originated in Madagascar.

The generic name Adansonia honours Michel Adanson, the French naturalist and explorer who provided the first detailed botanical description and illustrations of Adansonia digitata. The baobab, however, is also known as the "upside down tree", a name attributable to the trees' overall appearance and historical myths. Baobabs are among the longest-lived of vascular plants and have large flowers that are reproductive for a maximum of 15 hours. The flowers open around dusk with sufficiently rapid movement that is detectable by the naked eye. The fruit are large, oval to round and berry-like, and hold round to kidney-shaped seeds in a dry, pulpy matrix.

In the early 21st century, baobabs in southern Africa began to die off rapidly and mysteriously—the cause is yet to be determined. Blight or pests are unlikely to have caused such rapid death, so some have speculated that the cause may have been mass dehydration.

== Description ==
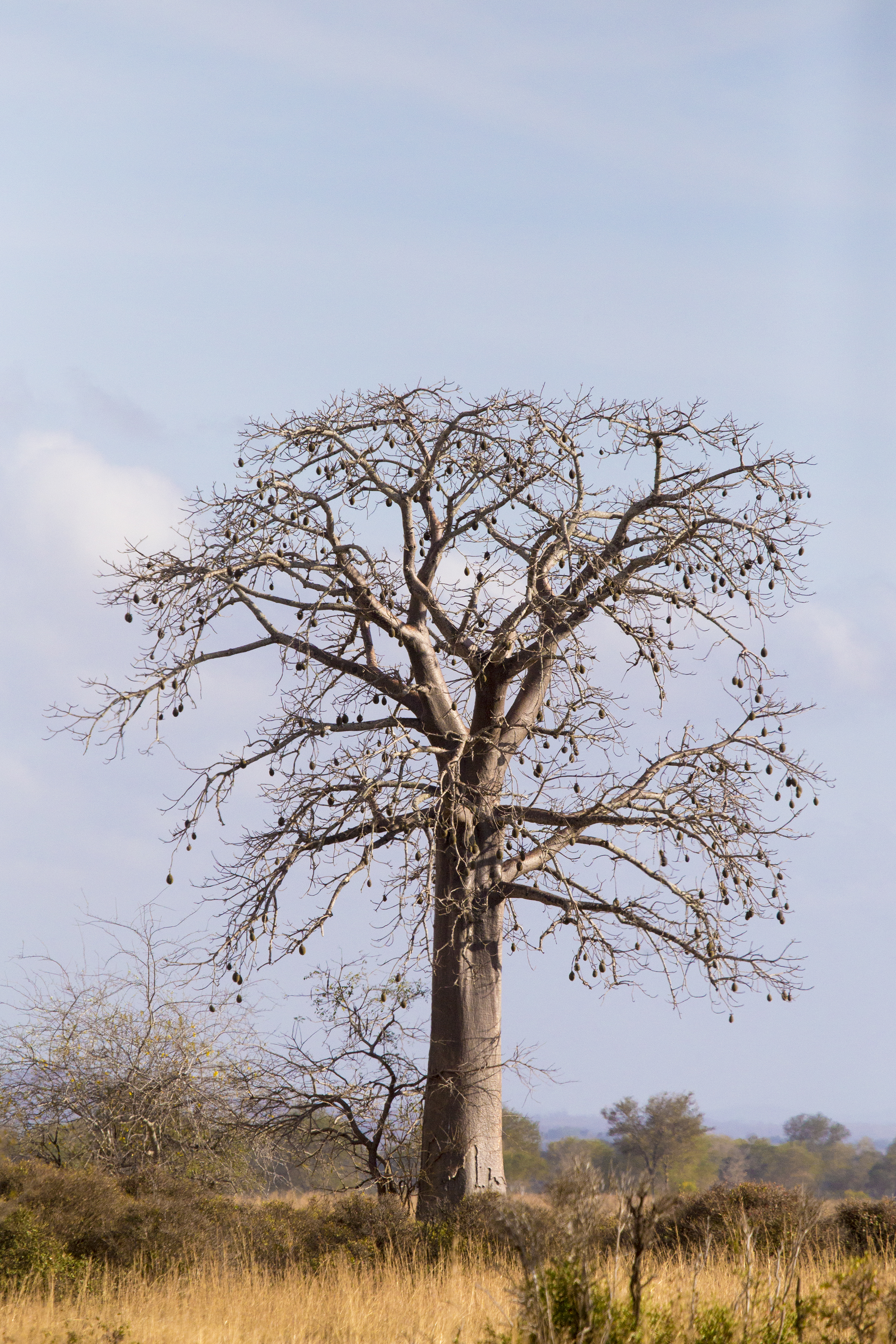
Adansonia digitata (African baobab) tree in Mikumi National Park with its fruit hanging

Baobabs are long-lived deciduous, small to large trees from 5 to 30 m (20 to 100 ft) tall with broad trunks and compact crowns. Young trees usually have slender, tapering trunks, often with a swollen base. Mature trees have massive trunks that are bottle-shaped or cylindrical and tapered from bottom to top. The trunk is made of fibrous wood arranged in concentric rings, although rings are not always formed annually and so cannot be used to determine the age of individual trees. Tree diameter fluctuates with rainfall so it is thought that water may be stored in the trunk. Baobab trees have two types of shoots—long, green vegetative ones, and stout, woody reproductive ones. Branches can be massive and spread out horizontally from the trunk or are ascending.

Adansonia gregorii is generally the smallest of the baobabs, rarely getting to over 10 m (33 ft) tall and often with multiple trunks. Both A. rubrostipa and A. madagascariensis are small to large trees, from 5 to 20 m (16 to 66 ft) tall. The other baobabs grow from 25 to 30 m (80 to 100 ft) tall, with 2 to 3 m (7 to 10 ft) diameter trunks. A. digitata, however, often has massive single or multiple trunks of up to 10 m (33 ft) diameter.

=== Leaves ===
Leaves are palmately compound in mature trees, but seedlings and regenerating shoots may have simple leaves. The transition to compound leaves comes with age and may be gradual. Leaves have 5–11 leaflets, with the largest ones in the middle and may be stalkless or with short petioles. Leaflets may have toothed or smooth edges, and may be hairless or have simple-to-clumped hairs. Baobabs have stipules at the base of the leaves, but the stipules are soon shed in most species. Baobabs are deciduous, shedding leaves during the dry season.

=== Flowers ===
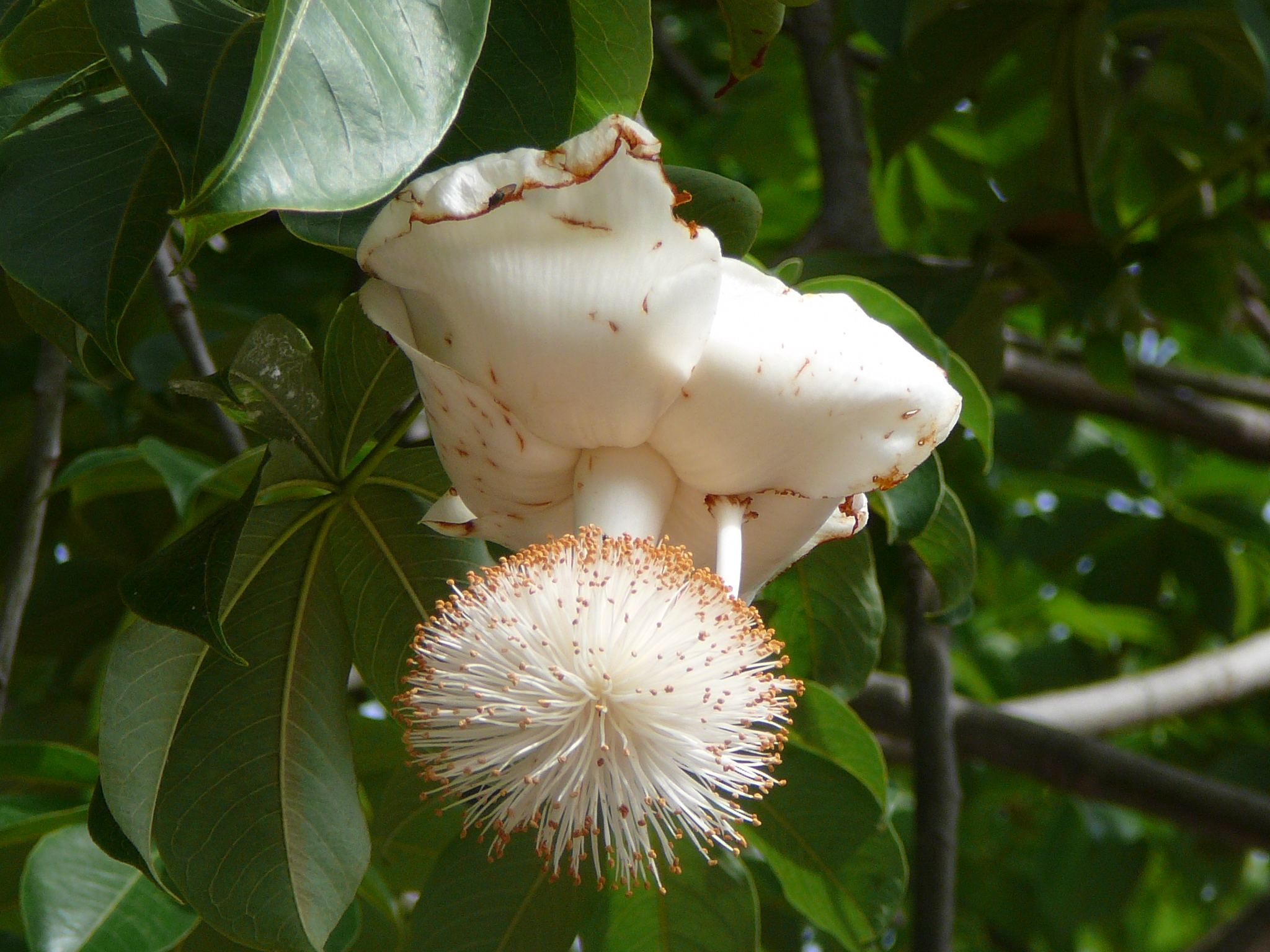
Open flower showing distorted petals and the unfused ball of stamens set on top of the staminal tube

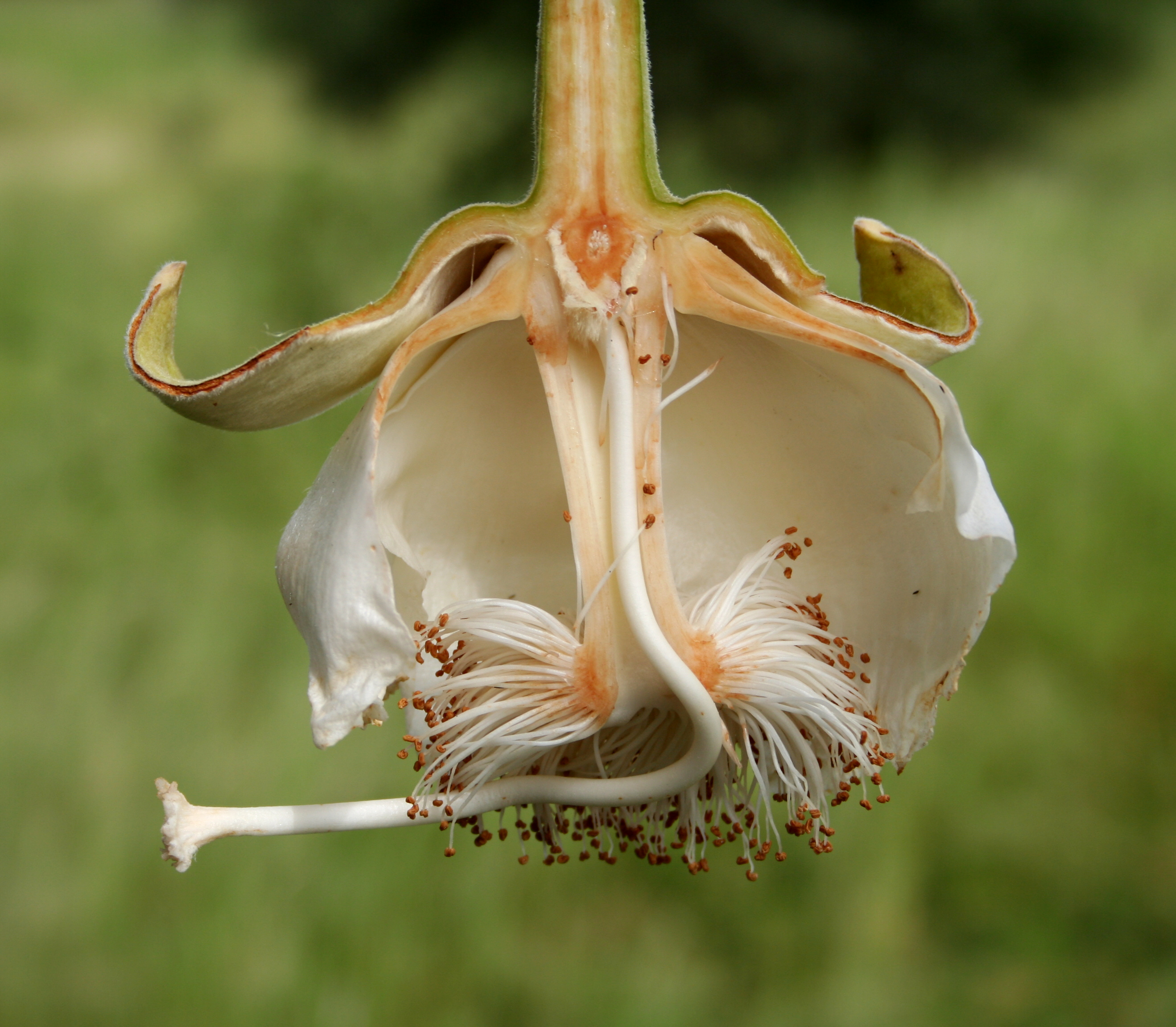
Bisected flower showing the style running through the staminal tube, bending, then projecting out of the stamens

In most Adansonia species, the flowers are borne on short erect or spreading stalks in the axils of the leaves near the tips of reproductive shoots. Only A. digitata has flowers and fruit set on long, hanging stalks. There is usually only a single flower in an axil, but sometimes flowers occur in pairs. They are large, showy and strongly scented. They only open near dusk. Opening is rapid and movement of the flower parts is fast enough to be visible. Most Adansonia species are pollinated by bats.

Flowers may remain attached to the trees for several days, but the reproductive phase is very short, with pollen shed during the first night and stigmas shriveled by the morning. The flower is made up of an outer 5-lobed calyx, and an inner ring of petals set around a fused tube of stamens. The outer lobes of the calyx are usually green (brown in A. grandidieri) and in bud are joined almost to the tip. As the flower opens, the calyx lobes split apart and become coiled or bent back (reflexed) at the base of the flower. The inner surface of the lobes are silky-hairy and cream, pink, or red. Sometimes the lobes do not separate cleanly, distorting the shape of the flower as they bend back. The calyx lobes remain fused at the base, leaving a feature (calyx tube) that has nectar-producing tissue and that is cup-shaped, flat or tubular; the form of the calyx tube varies with species. The flowers have a central tube (staminal tube) made up of fused stalks of stamens (filaments), with unfused filaments above. A densely hairy ovary is enclosed in the staminal tube, and a long style tipped with a stigma emerges from the filaments. Petals are set near the base of the staminal tube and are variable in shape and colour. The flowers, when fresh, may be white, cream, bright yellow or dark red, but fade quickly, often turning reddish when dried.

=== Fruit ===
The fruit of the baobabs is one of their distinguishing features. It is large, oval-to-round, and berry-like in most species (usually less than 10 centimetres (3.9 in) long in A. madagascariensis). It has a dry, hard outer shell of variable thickness. In most species, the shell is indehiscent (does not break open easily). A. gibbosa is the only species with fruit that crack while still on the tree, which then tend to break open upon landing on the ground. Inside the outer shell, kidney-shaped seeds 10–15(−20) mm long are set in a dry pulp.

== Taxonomy ==
The earliest written reports of baobab are from a 14th-century travelogue by the Arab traveler Ibn Battuta. The first botanical description was in the De medicina Aegyptiorum by Prospero Alpini (1592), looking at fruit that he observed in Egypt from an unknown source. They were called Bahobab, possibly from the Arabic أَبُو حِبَاب abū ḥibāb meaning "many-seeded fruit". The French explorer and botanist Michel Adanson (1727–1806) observed a baobab tree in 1749 on the island of Sor in Senegal, and wrote the first detailed botanical description of the full tree, accompanied with illustrations. Recognising the connection to the fruit described by Alpini, he called the genus Baobab. Linnaeus later renamed the genus Adansonia, to honour Adanson, but use of baobab as a vernacular name remains common.

The genus Adansonia is in the subfamily Bombacoideae, within the family Malvaceae in the order Malvales. The subfamily Bombacoideae was previously treated as the Bombacaceae family but it is no longer recognised at the rank of family by the Angiosperm Phylogeny Group I 1998, II 2003 or the Kubitzki system 2003. The closest living relatives of Adansonia within Bombacoideae are the South American genera: Cavanillesia, Scleronema, Catostemma, and Aguiaria. There are eight accepted species of Adansonia. A new species (Adansonia kilima Pettigrew, et al.), was described in 2012, found in high-elevation sites in eastern and southern Africa. This, however, is no longer recognised as a distinct species but considered a synonym of A. digitata. Some high-elevation trees in Tanzania show different genetics and morphology, but further study is needed to determine if recognition of them as a separate species is warranted. The genus Adansonia is further divided into three sections. Section Adansonia includes only A. digitata. This species has hanging flowers and fruit, set on long flowering stalks. This is the type species for the genus Adansonia. All species of Adansonia except A. digitata are diploid; A. digitata is tetraploid. Section Brevitubae includes A. grandidieri and A. suarexensis. These are species with flower buds that set on short pedicles and that are approximately twice as long as wide. The other species are all classified within the section Longitubae. They also have flowers and fruit set on short pedicels, but the flower buds are five or more times as long as wide.

== Species ==
As of July 2020, eight species of Adansonia have been recognised, with six endemic to Madagascar, one native to mainland Africa and the Arabian Peninsula, and one native to Australia. The mainland African species (Adansonia digitata) also occurs on Madagascar, but it is not a native of that island. African Baobabs were introduced in ancient times to south Asia and possibly Australia (if it is ancestral to the Australian baobab), and during the colonial era to the Caribbean. They are also established in the island nation of Cape Verde.

A ninth species was described in 2012 (Adansonia kilima Pettigrew, et al.), but is no longer recognised as a distinct species.

The oldest splits within Adansonia are likely no older than 15 million years. The African and Australian baobabs are closely related, and thus the Australian species represents dispersal from Africa, though there is some dispute as to whether the dispersal was human-vectored.

The lineage leading to Adansonia was found to have diverged from its closest relatives in Bombacoideae like Ceiba /Chorisia at the end of the Eocene, during a time of abrupt global climate cooling and drying, while a divergence of this Adansonia+Ceiba /Chorisia clade from Pachira was found to be more ancient, dating to the middle Eocene.

List of species of Adansonia
Image	Species	Common names	Native range
	Adansonia digitata L. (also includes Adansonia kilima)	African baobab, dead-rat-tree, monkey-bread-tree, montane African baobab, Gongolaze	western, northeastern, central and southern Africa, SW Asia (Yemen, Oman)
	Adansonia grandidieri Baill.	Grandidier's baobab, giant baobab	west central Madagascar
	Adansonia gregorii F.Muell. (syn. A. gibbosa)	boab, Australian baobab, bottletree, cream-of-tartar-tree, gouty-stem	Australia (Northern Territory, Western Australia)
	Adansonia madagascariensis Baill.	Madagascar baobab	northwest and north Madagascar
	Adansonia perrieri Capuron	Perrier's baobab	northern Madagascar
	Adansonia rubrostipa Jum. & H.Perrier (syn. A. fony)	fony baobab	central-to-south part of western Madagascar
	Adansonia suarezensis H.Perrier	Suarez baobab	northern Madagascar
	Adansonia za Baill.	za baobab	west and southwest Madagascar

== Habitat ==
The Malagasy species are important components of the Madagascar dry deciduous forests. Within that biome, Adansonia madagascariensis and A. rubrostipa occur specifically in the Anjajavy Forest, sometimes growing out of the tsingy limestone itself. A. digitata has been called "a defining icon of African bushland". The tree also grows wild in Sudan in the regions of Darfur and the state of Kordofan. The locals call it gongolaze and use its fruit as food and medicine and use the tree trunks as reservoirs to save water.

== Ecology ==
Baobabs store water in the trunk (up to 120,000 litres or 32,000 US gallons) to endure harsh drought conditions. All occur in seasonally arid areas, and are deciduous, shedding their leaves during the dry season. Across Africa, the oldest and largest baobabs began to die in the early 21st century, likely from a combination of drought and rising temperatures. The trees appear to become parched, then become dehydrated and unable to support their massive trunks.

Baobabs are important as nest sites for birds, in particular the mottled spinetail and four species of weaver.

== Notable trees ==
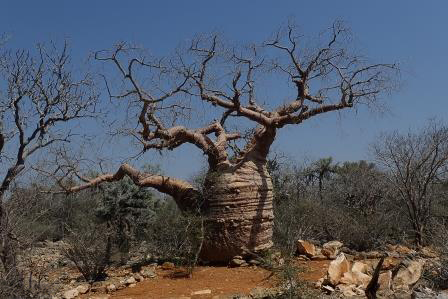
"Grandmother" Fony baobab

Radiocarbon dating has provided data on a few individuals of A. digitata. The Panke baobab in Zimbabwe was some 2,450 years old when it died in 2011, making it the oldest angiosperm ever documented, and two other trees—Dorslandboom in Namibia and Glencoe in South Africa—were estimated to be approximately 2,000 years old. Another specimen known as Grootboom was dated and found to be at least 1,275 years old. The Glencoe Baobab, a specimen of A. digitata in Limpopo Province, South Africa, was considered to be the largest living individual, with a maximum circumference of 47 m (154 ft) and a diameter of about 15.9 m (52 ft). The tree has since split into two parts, so the widest individual trunk may now be that of the Sunland Baobab, or Platland tree, also in South Africa. The diameter of this tree at ground level is 9.3 m (31 ft) and its circumference at breast height is 34 m (112 ft).

Two large baobabs growing in Tsimanampetsotse National Park were also studied using radiocarbon dating. One called Grandmother is made up of three fused trunks of different ages, with the oldest part of the tree an estimated 1,600 years old. The second, "polygamous baobab", has six fused stems, and is an estimated 1,000 years old.

== Culinary uses ==
=== Leaves ===
The tree's leaves may be eaten as a leaf vegetable.

=== Fruit ===
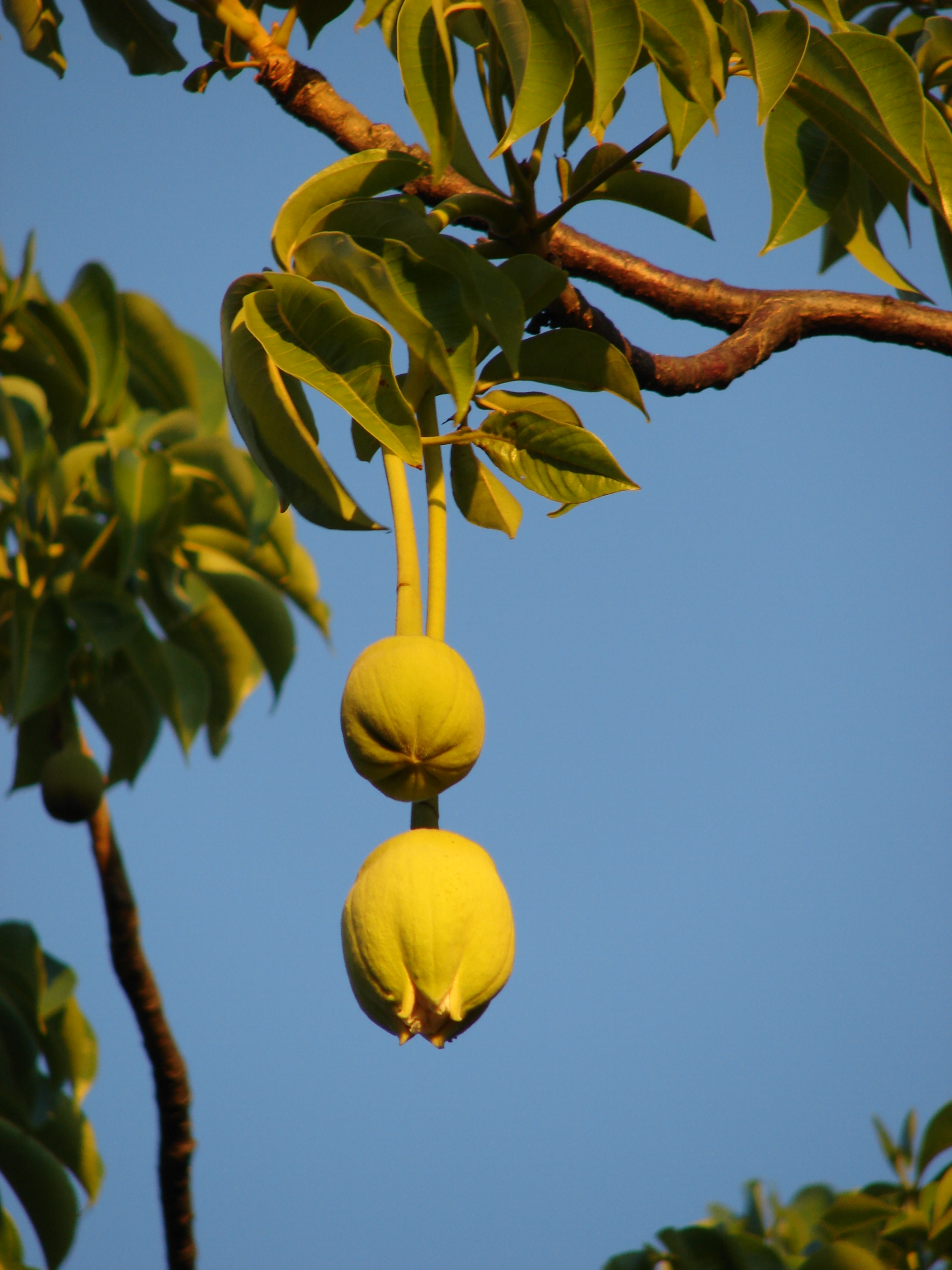
Adansonia digitata fruit

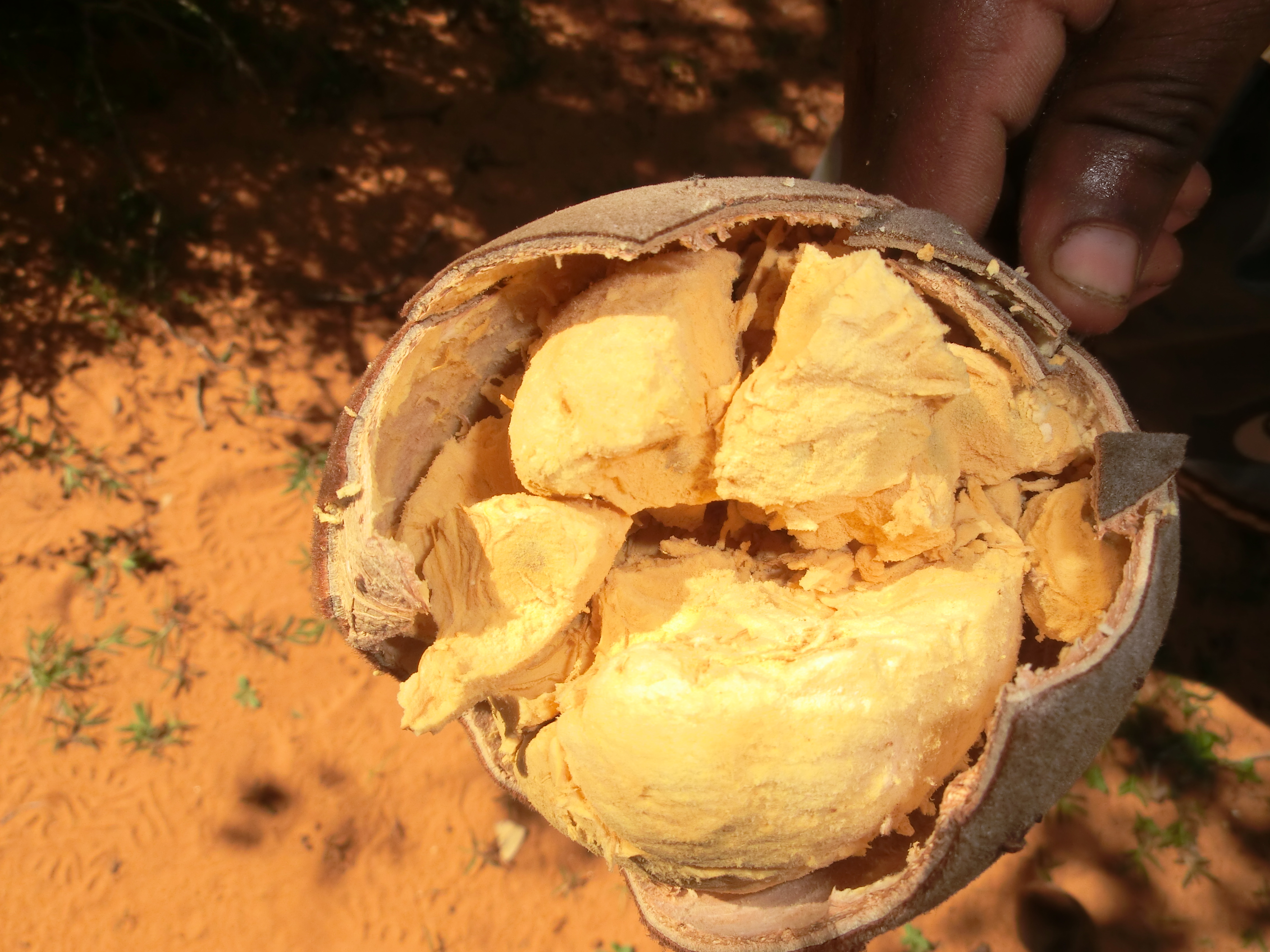
Adansonia rubrostipa, fruit pulp

The white pith in the fruit of the Australian baobab (A. gregorii) tastes like sherbet. It has an acidic, tart, citrus flavor. In Zimbabwe, the fruit of A. digitata is eaten fresh or the crushed crumbly pulp is stirred into porridge and drinks. In Tanzania, the dry pulp of A. digitata is added to sugarcane to aid fermentation in brewing (beermaking).

==== Nutrition ====
The dried fruit powder of A. digitata contains about 11% water, 80% carbohydrates (50% dietary fiber), low fat and protein levels, and modest levels of riboflavin, calcium, magnesium, potassium, iron, and phytosterols. Vitamin C content, described as variable in different samples, was in a range of 74 to 163 milligrams (1.14 to 2.52 gr) per 100 grams (3.5 oz) of dried powder.

==== Marketing ====
In 2008, baobab dried fruit pulp was authorised in the EU as a safe food ingredient, and later in the year was granted GRAS (generally recognized as safe) status in the United States.

The African Baobab Alliance enables more than one million African women to financially gain from collection of the fruit for manufacturing of powder and ingredients having an estimated commercial value worldwide of $10 billion in 2027. China, the United States, and Europe are major markets.

=== Seed ===
The seeds of some species are a source of vegetable oil. The fruit pulp and seeds of A. grandidieri and A. za are eaten fresh.

== Other uses ==
Some baobab species are sources of fibre, dye, and fuel. Indigenous Australians used the native species A. gregorii for several products, making string from the root fibres and decorative crafts from the fruit. Baobab oil from the seed is also used in cosmetics, particularly in moisturisers.

== In culture ==
Baobab trees hold cultural and spiritual significance in many African societies. They are often the sites of communal gatherings, storytelling, and rituals. An unusual baobab was the namesake of Kukawa, formerly the capital of the Bornu Empire southwest of Lake Chad in Central Africa.

In the novel The Little Prince, the titular character takes care to root out baobabs that try to grow on his tiny planet home. The fearsome, grasping baobab trees, researchers have contended, were meant to represent Nazism attempting to destroy the planet.

== Gallery ==
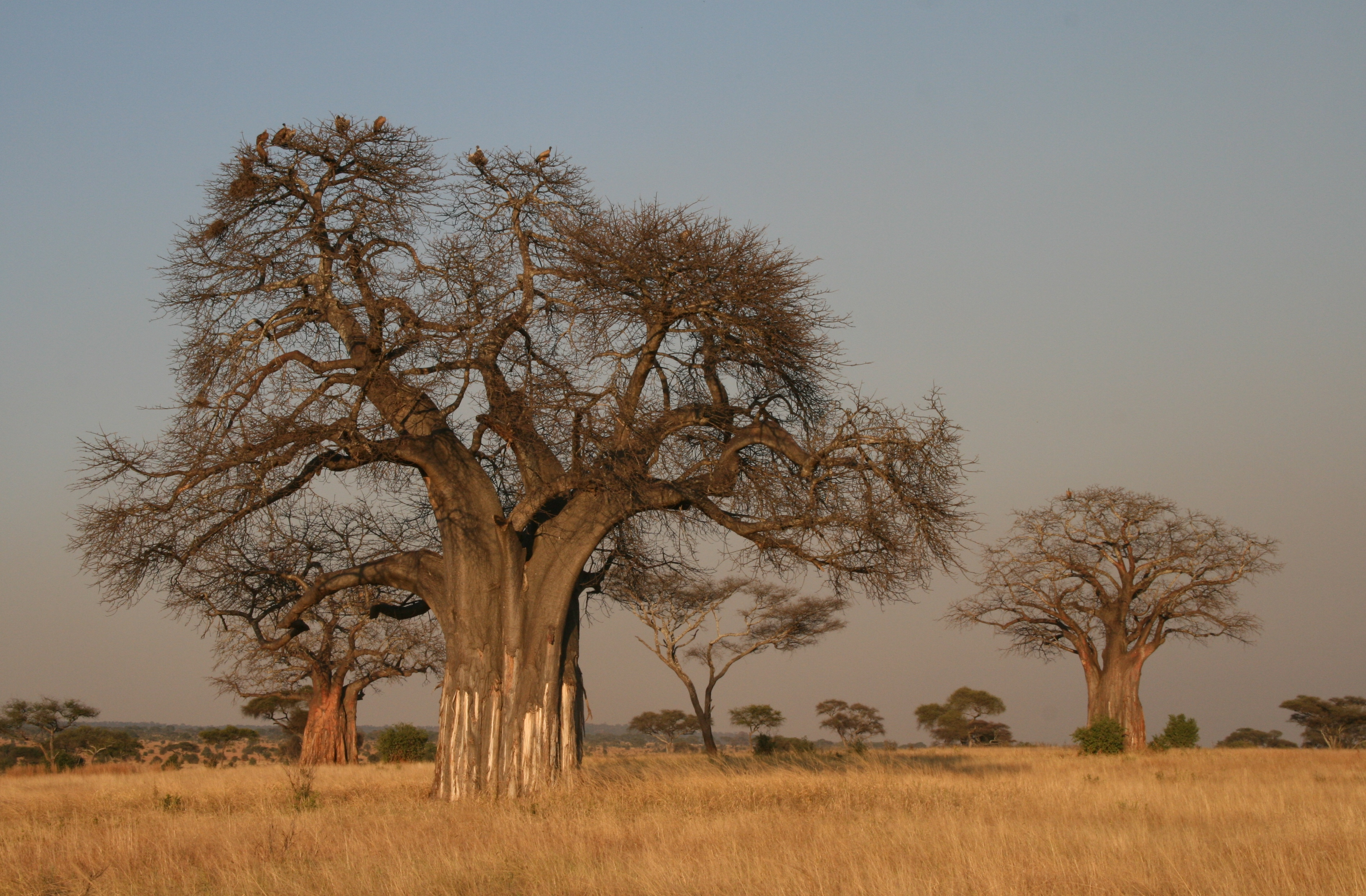
Adansonia digitata

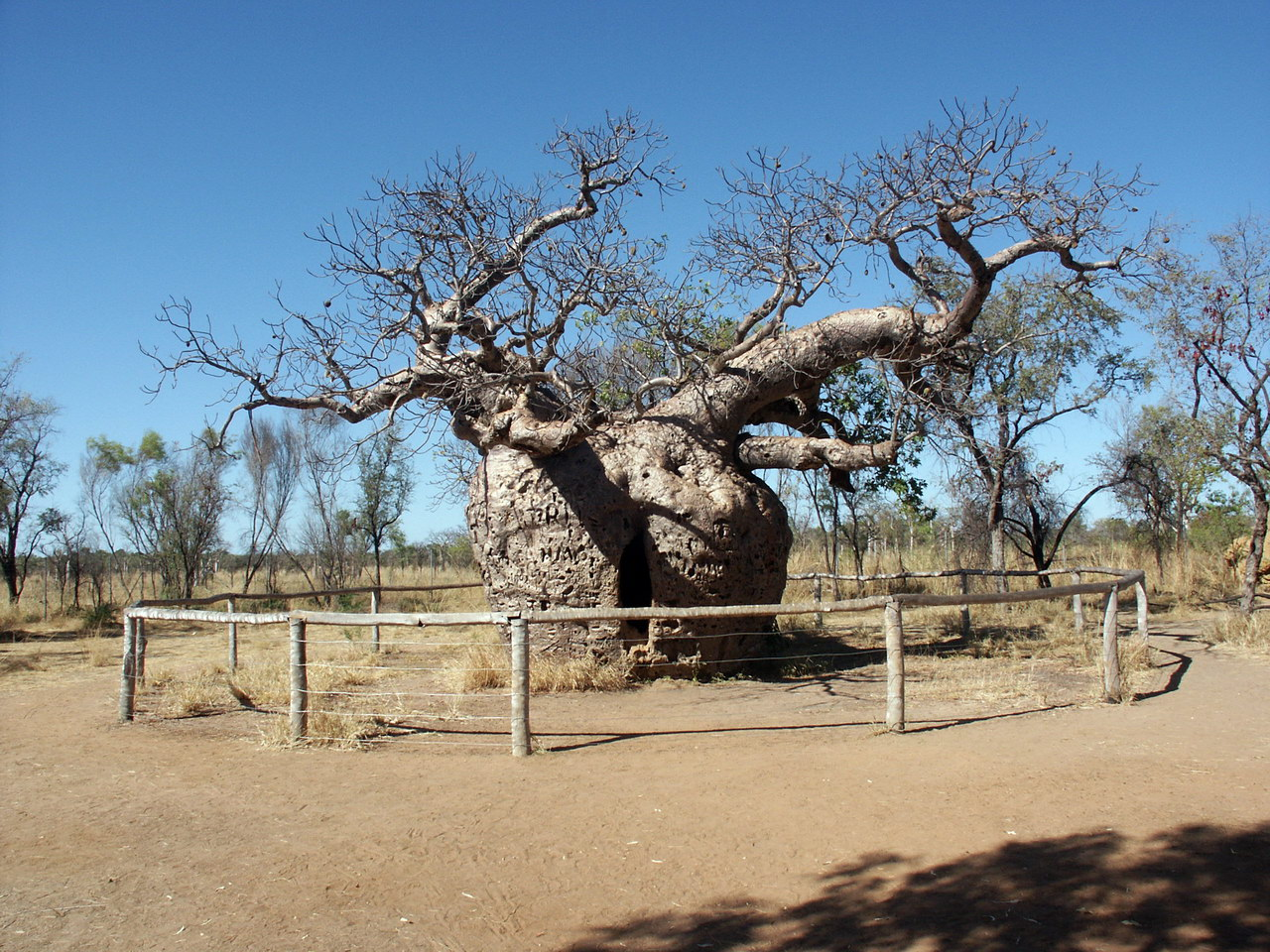
Adansonia gregorii

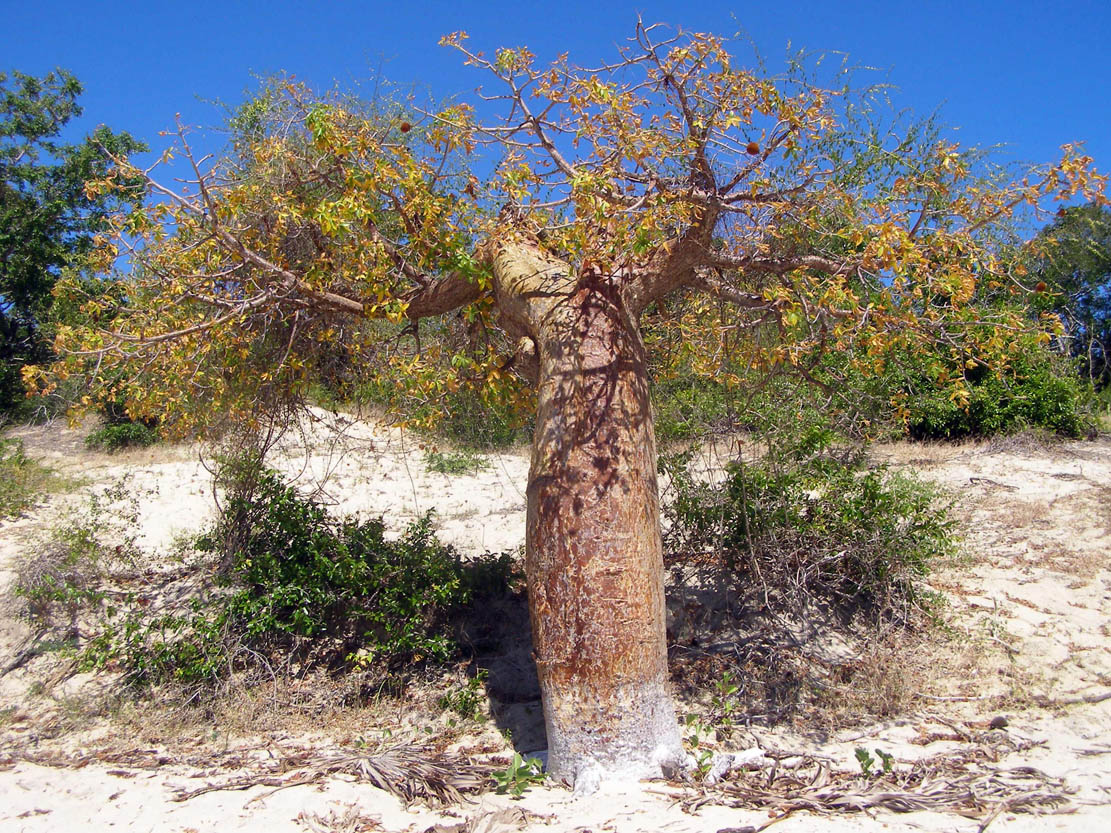
Adansonia rubrostipa

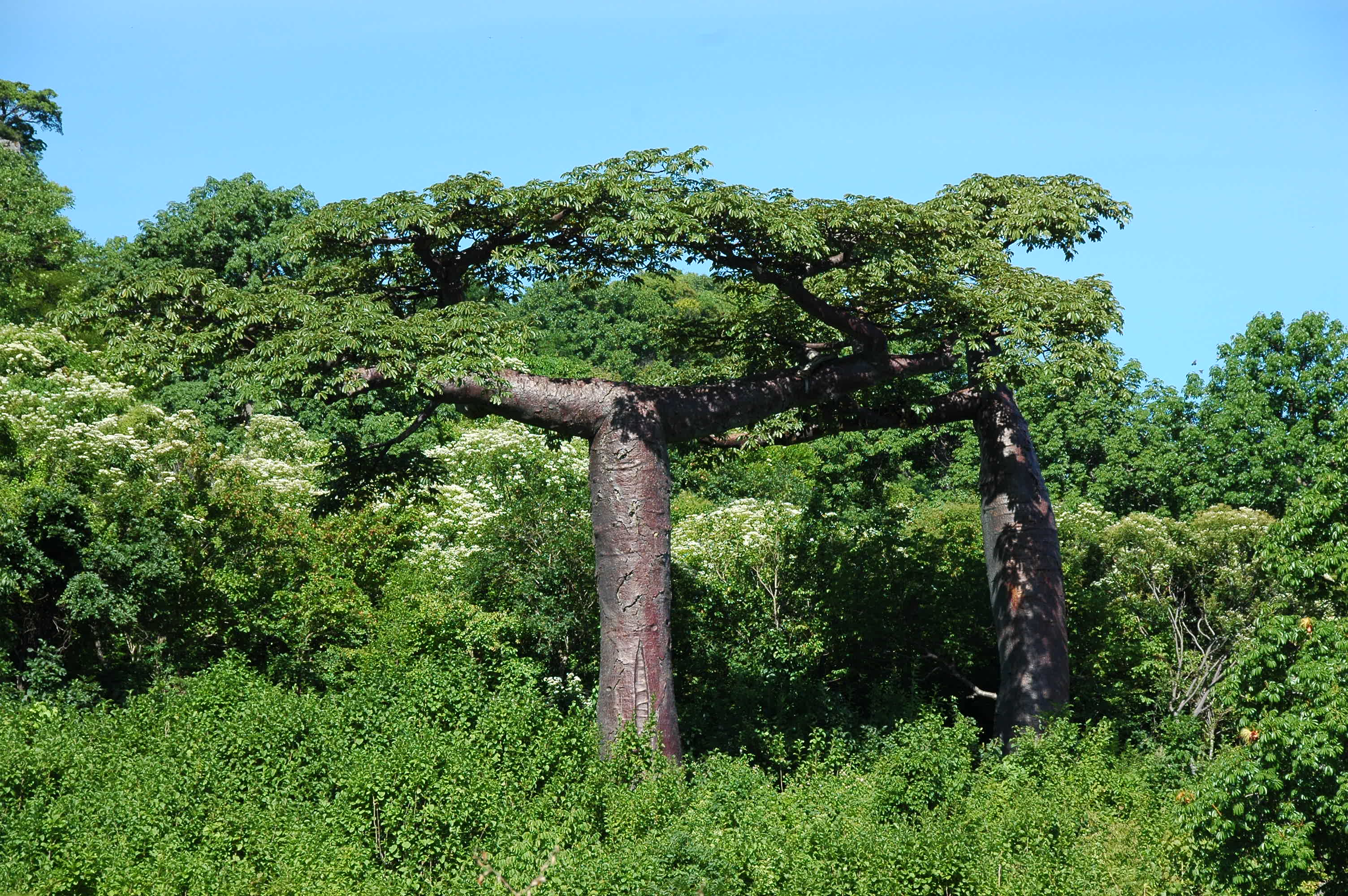
Adansonia suarezensis

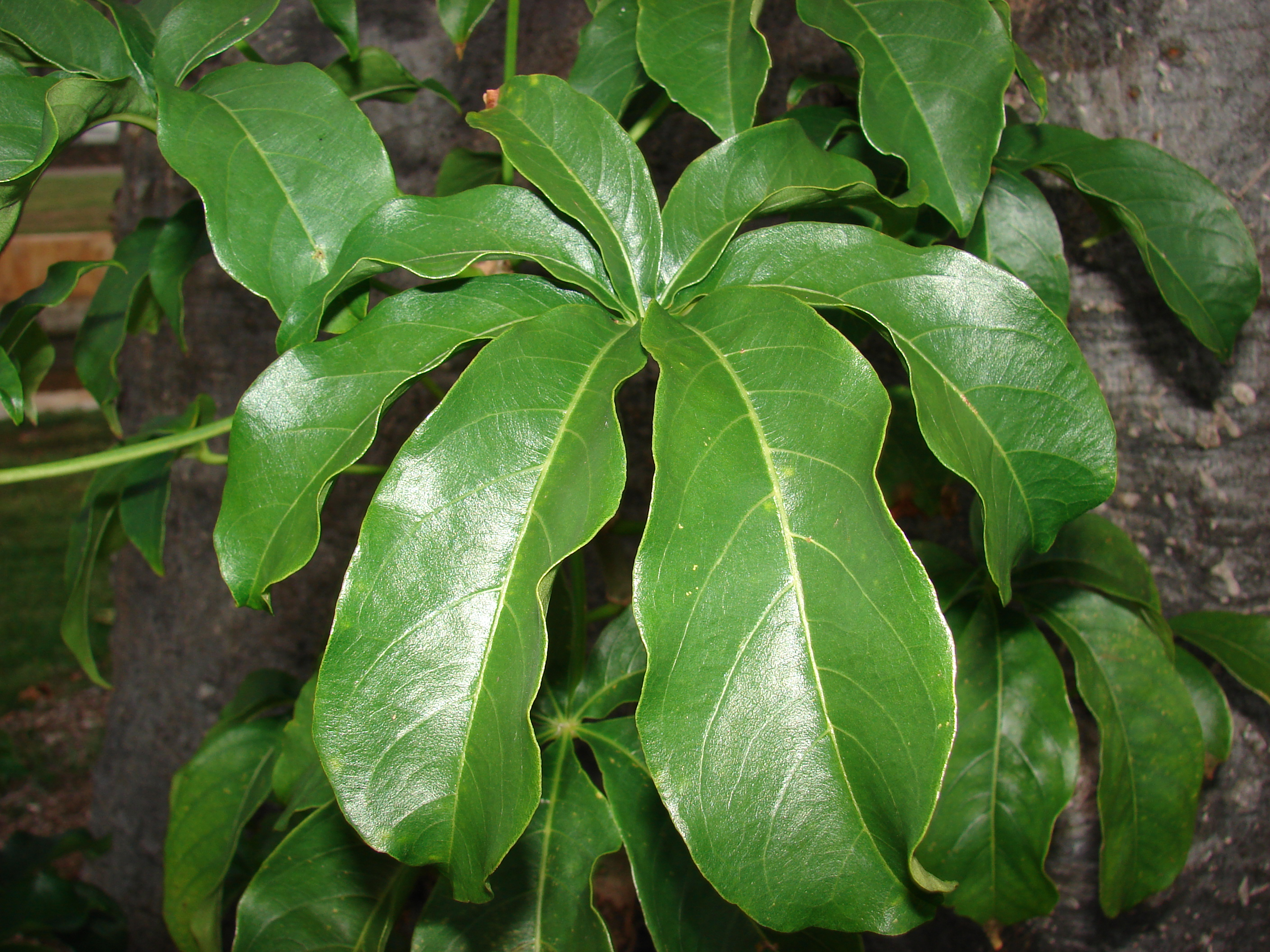
Adansonia digitata leaf

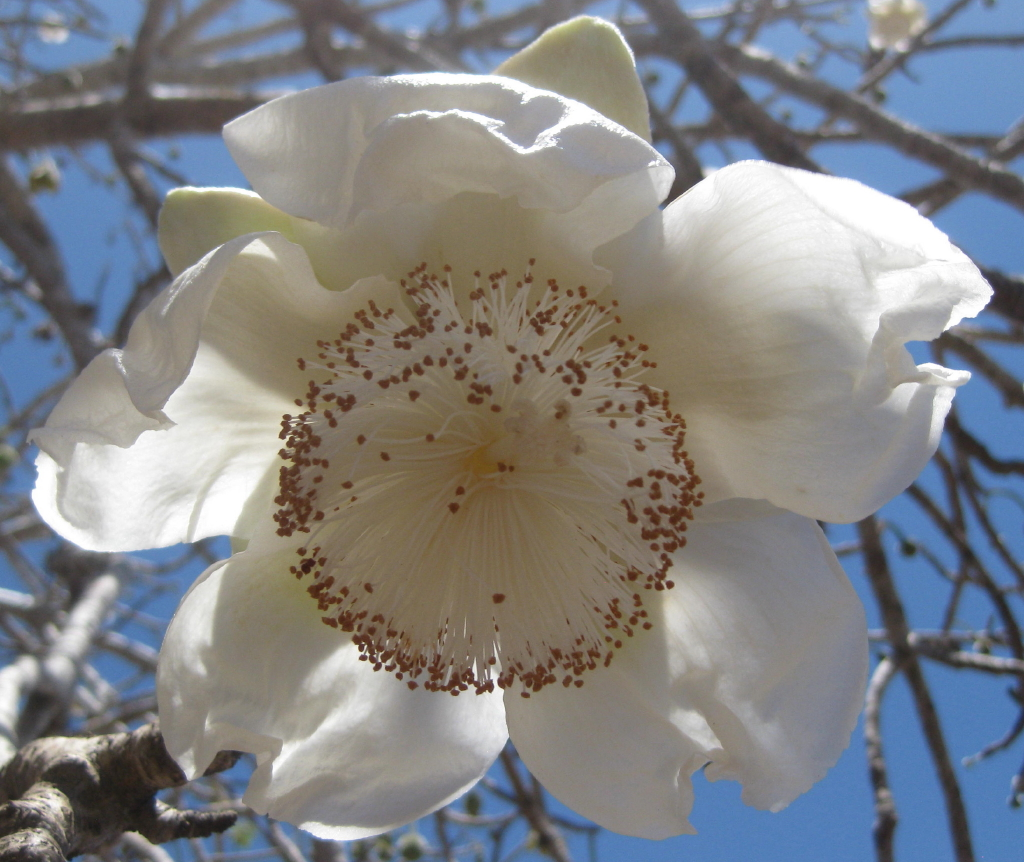
Adansonia digitata flower

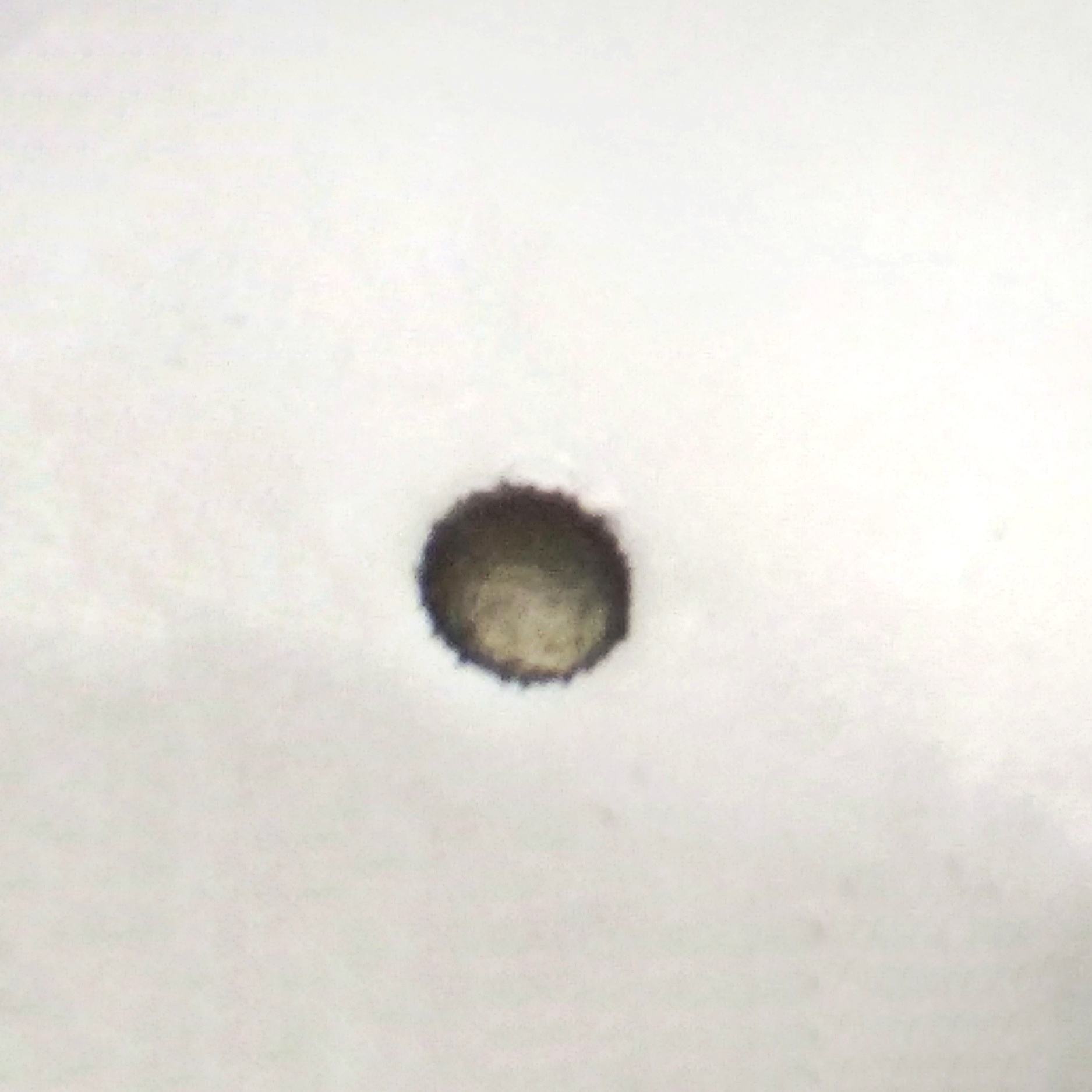
Adansonia pollen

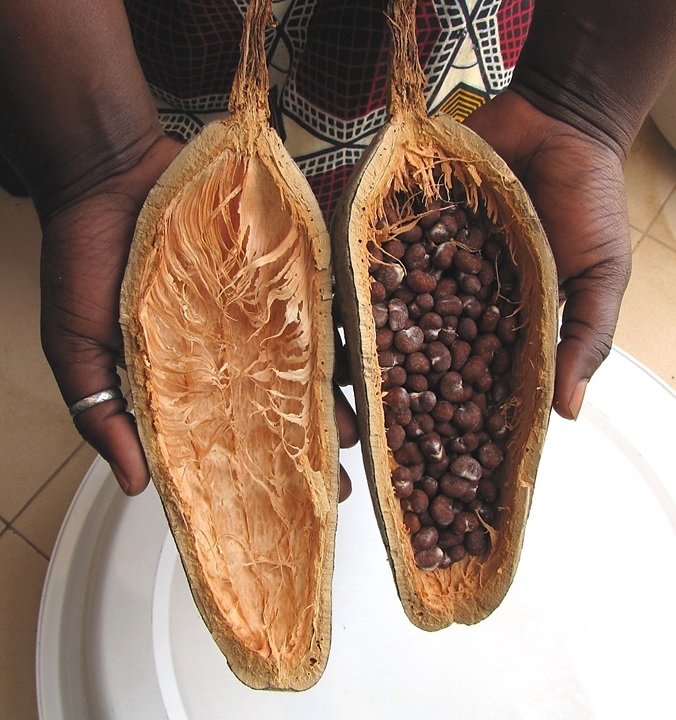
Adansonia digitata seeds from the fruit

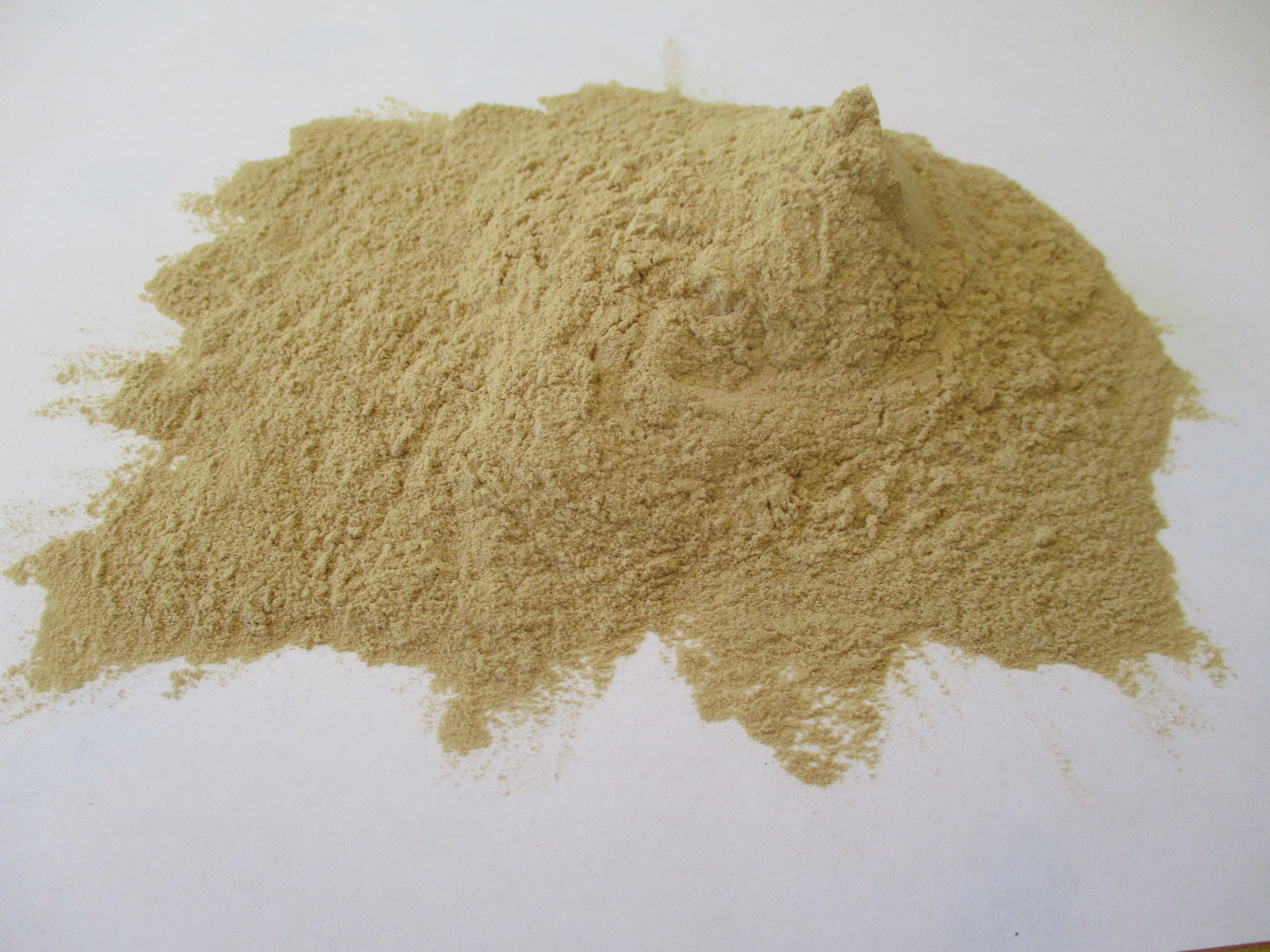
Baobab powder

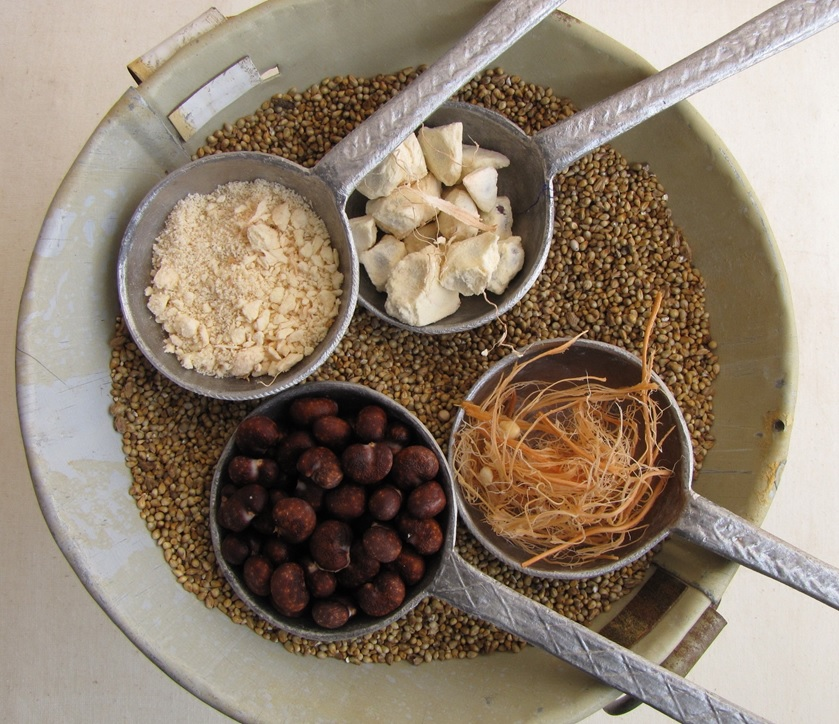
Elements of the fruit pulp of Adansonia digitata (clockwise from top right): whole fruit pulp chunks, fibres, seeds, powder from the pulp
