= Adansonia kilima =

Scientific classification
- Kingdom: Plantae
- Clade: Tracheophytes
- Clade: Angiosperms
- Clade: Eudicots
- Clade: Rosids
- Order: Malvales
- Family: Malvaceae
- Genus: Adansonia
- Species: A. kilima/digitata

Binomial name
- Adansonia kilima/digitata Pettigrew, K.L.Bell, Bhagw., Grinan, Jillani, Jean Mey., Wabuyele & C.E.Vickers

Species of tree

Adansonia kilima, is the name given in 2012 to certain upland populations of baobab trees of southern and eastern Africa that are now considered to be synonymous with Adansonia digitata It has overlapping geographic range with A. digitata, is tetraploid, and apparently the same species as the tetraploid A. digitata.

== Description ==
The Montane African Baobab, Adansonia kilima, was described in 2012, but is no longer considered a valid species. Trees of this new species were distinguished from the African Baobab (Adansonia digitata) by having smaller flowers (about half the size of A. digitata flowers) which it presented in larger numbers each night, and with the pollen grains more spiny and about two-third the diameter of the pollen of A. digitata. However, Cron et al. (2016) showed that none of these differences were consistent, and that there was no genetic difference between the forms, which should therefore all be considered A. digitata.

== Taxonomy ==
The scientific name Adansonia refers to the French explorer and botanist, Michel Adanson (1727–1806), who wrote the first botanical description for the type species, the African baobab, Adansonia digitata. All species of Adansonia except A. digitata are diploid; A. digitata is tetraploid. Different populations of the African baobab show some differences and it has been suggested that the taxon contains more than one species. Although there are some high-elevation trees in Tanzania that show different genetics and morphology, Adansonia kilima is no longer recognized as a distinct species but considered a synonym of A. digitata.
