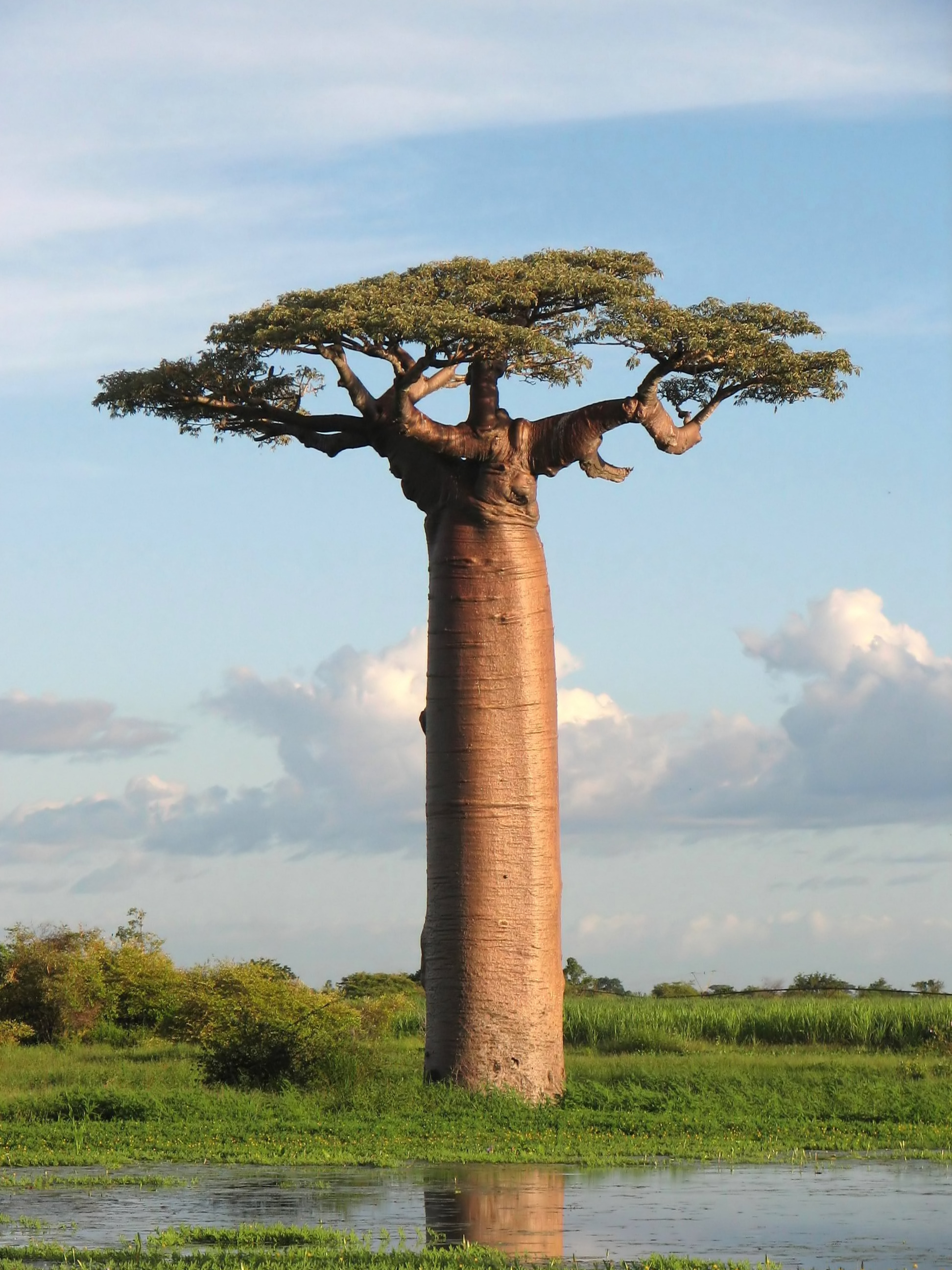

Conservation status
- Endangered (IUCN 3.1)
- CITES Appendix II

Scientific classification
- Kingdom: Plantae
- Clade: Tracheophytes
- Clade: Angiosperms
- Clade: Eudicots
- Clade: Rosids
- Order: Malvales
- Family: Malvaceae
- Genus: Adansonia
- Species: A. grandidieri

Binomial name
- Adansonia grandidieri Baill., 1888

= Adansonia grandidieri =

Species of tree from Madagascar

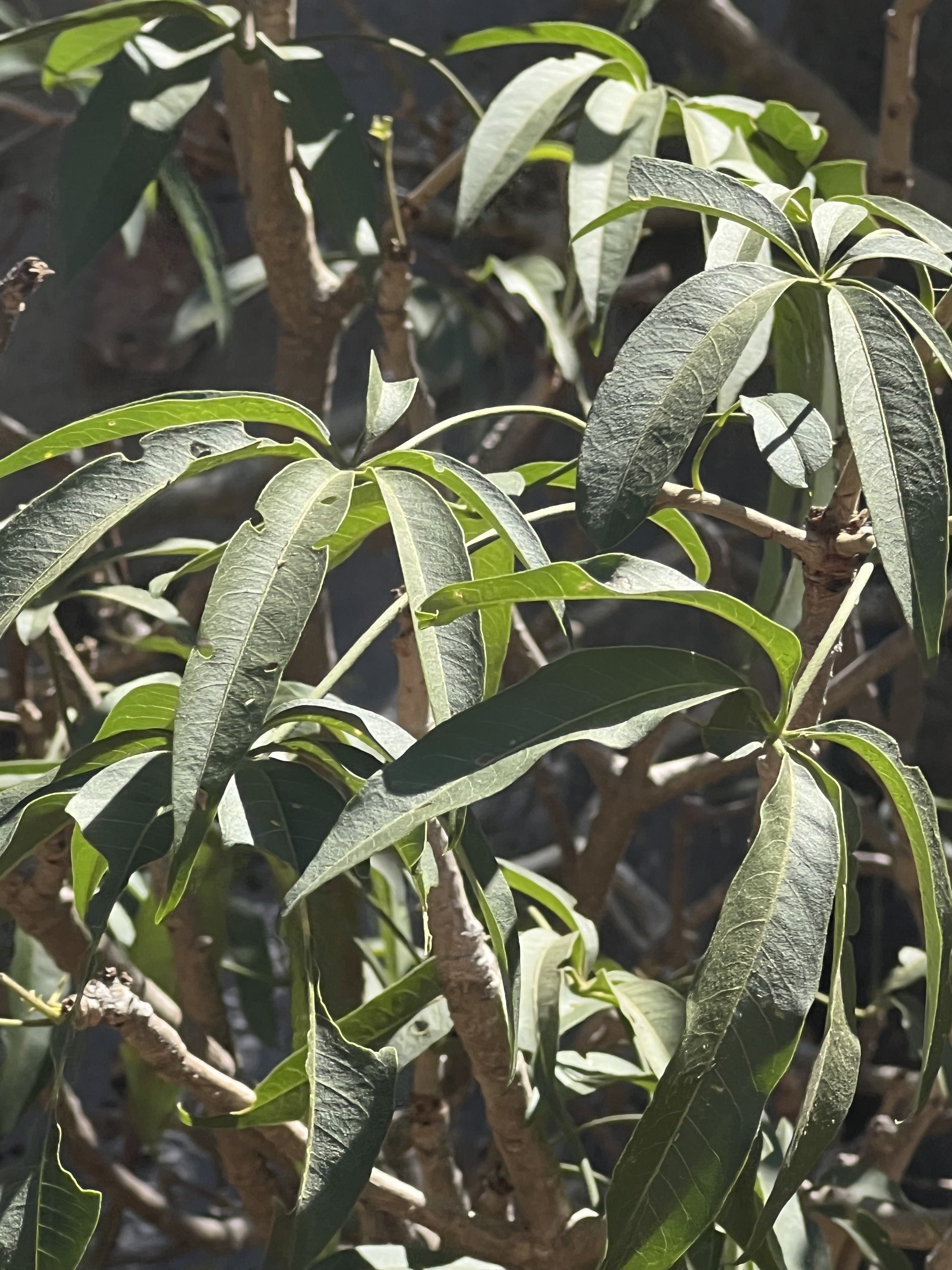
Foliage

Adansonia grandidieri is the biggest and most famous of Madagascar's six species of baobabs. It is sometimes known as Grandidier's baobab or the giant baobab. In French it is called Baobab malgache. The local name is renala or reniala (from Malagasy: reny ala, meaning "mother of the forest"). This tree is endemic to the island of Madagascar, where it is an endangered species threatened by the encroachment of agricultural land. This is the tree found at the Avenue of the Baobabs.

== Description ==
Grandidier's baobabs have massive, cylindrical, thick trunks, up to three meters across, covered with smooth, reddish-grey bark. They can reach 25 to 30 m (82 to 98 ft) in height. The crown is flat-topped, with horizontal main branches.

=== Leaves ===
Leaves are palmately compound, typically with 9 to 11 leaflets. This is the only species of baobab with leaflets that are blueish-green and that are densely covered with star-shaped hairs.

=== Flowers ===
Flowering occurs during the dry season, from May to August, before leaves appear. Buds are erect, rounded and dark brown. The flowers are made up of 5 (sometimes 3) calyx lobes that are bent back and twisted at the base of the flower. The lobes are fused at the base forming an open cup about 1 cm deep. Petals are white, aging to yellow, up to 20 mm long and about 5 times as long as broad. The flowers have a white central tube (staminal tube) that is up to 16 mm long and is made up of fused stalks of stamens (filaments). 600 – 700 unfused filaments up to 6.5 cm long spread out from the top of the staminal tube. A densely hairy ovary is enclosed in the staminal tube, and a long style tipped with a white or pinkish stigma emerges from the filaments.

=== Fruits and seeds ===
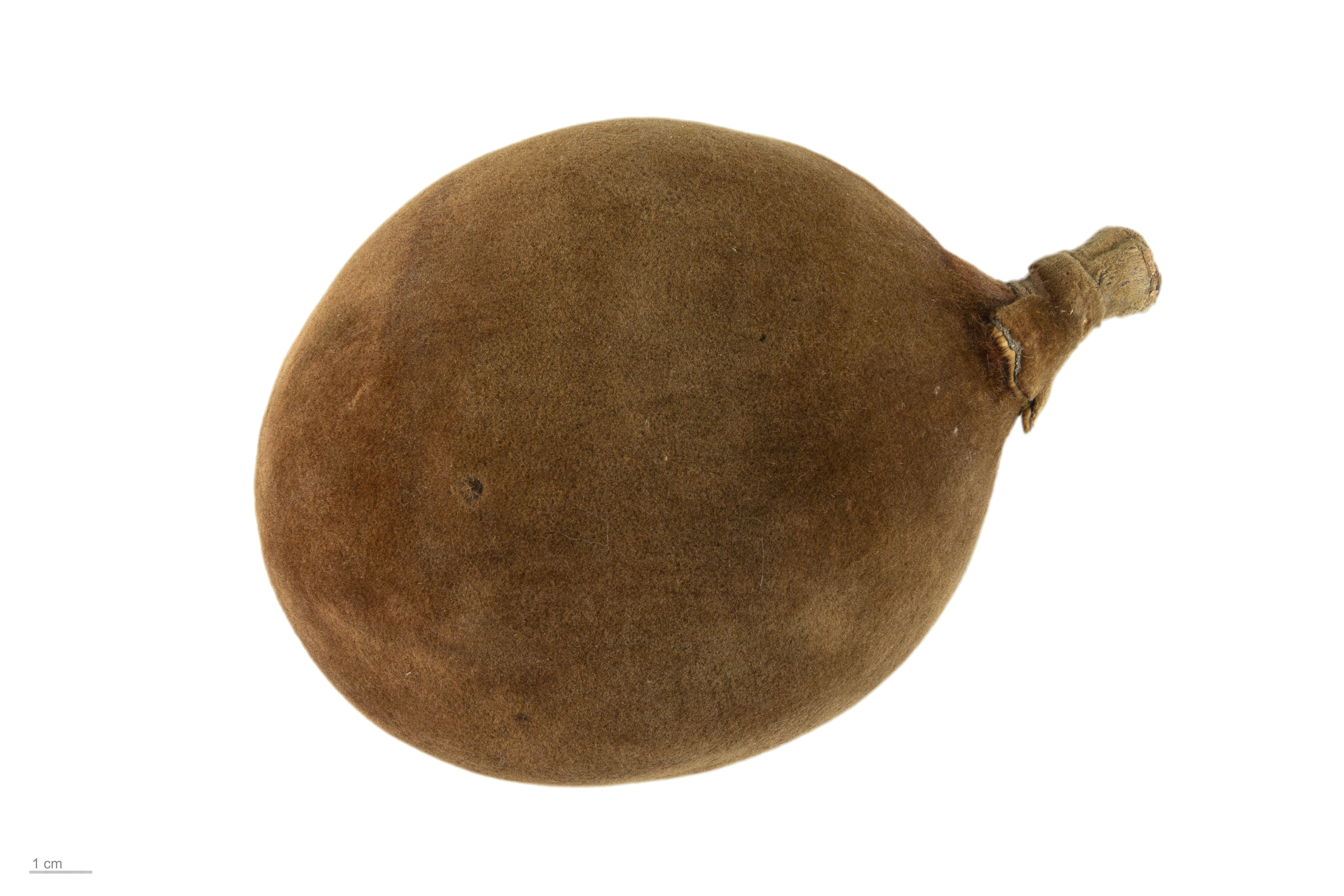
Adansonia grandidieri (MHNT)

The fruits are large, dry and rounded to ovoid. They have a hard shell 2 – 4.5 mm thick and are covered with dense reddish-brown hairs. They contain large (12-20 mm long) kidney-shaped seeds within an edible pulp.

== Range and habitat ==
This baobab occurs in south-western Madagascar, between Lake Ihotry (near Morombe) and Bereboka. Grandidier's baobab used to inhabit dry, deciduous forest, especially near seasonal rivers or lakes. However, today it is mainly found in open, agricultural land or degraded scrubland.

== Life cycle and ecology ==
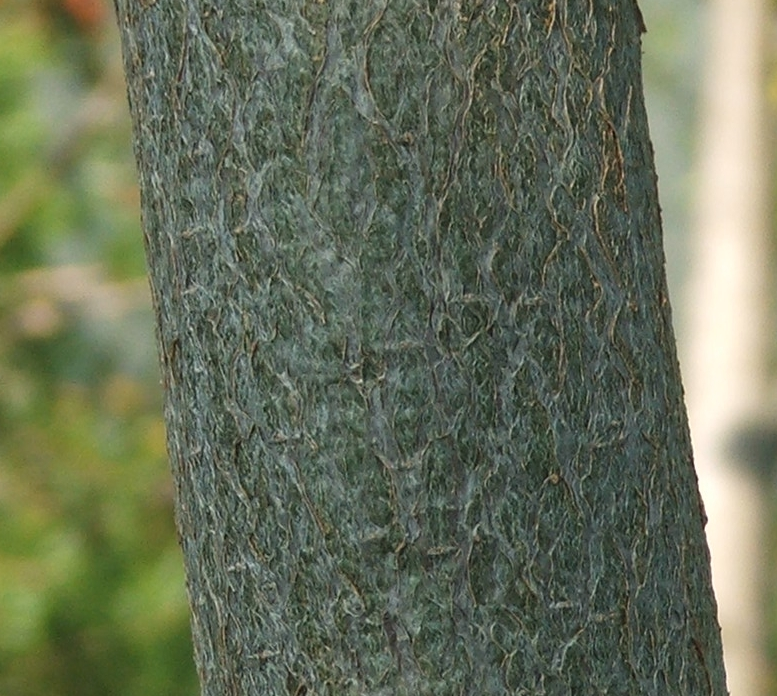
Bark of a young tree

The long-lived Grandidier's baobab is in leaf from October to May, and flowers between May and August. The flowers, said to smell of sour watermelon, open just before or soon after dusk, and all the pollen is released during the first night. The tree is pollinated by nocturnal mammals, such as fork-marked lemurs, and insects like the Hawk Moth. The lemurs move through the canopies, inserting their snouts into the white flowers and licking nectar from the petal bases, resulting in pollen being deposited on the lemurs' faces, whereas the moth is slightly more effective at pollination because it flies from tree to tree with most of its body covered in pollen.

The species bears ripe fruit in November and December. Unlike the baobabs of Africa and Australia, it appears that the seeds of the fruit are not dispersed by animals. Lemurs are the only living animals on Madagascar that are capable of acting as seed dispersers, yet seed dispersal by lemurs has never been documented. In the past, however, this could have been very different. Several species have gone extinct since human colonization of the island (1,500 to 2,000 years ago) that could very likely have been dispersers of the seeds. This includes species of primates that were thought to be similar to baboons, and the heaviest bird that ever lived, the elephant bird, which had a powerful beak that could have opened large fruit. Today, water may be the means by which the seeds are dispersed.

Lack of water can sometimes be a problem for plants in Madagascar. It appears that the baobab overcomes this by storing water within the fibrous wood of the trunk, as the tree's diameter fluctuates with rainfall.

== Taxonomy ==
Adansonia grandidieri was first described and published by botanist Henri Ernest Baillon in A.Grandidier's, Hist. Phys. Madagascar: tables 79e and 79a in 1888. The genus Adansonia honours the French explorer and botanist, Michel Adanson (1727–1806). The species name grandidieri honours the French botanist and explorer Alfred Grandidier (1836–1921). All species of Adansonia except A. digitata are diploid. The genus Adansonia is in the subfamily Bombacoideae, within the family Malvaceae in the order Malvales. Adansonia grandidieri is classified in section Brevitubae with the close relative Adansonia suarezensis. These are baobabs that are large trees with ovoid flower buds set on short, erect stalks.

== Uses ==
This is the most widely used of the Malagasy baobabs. The seeds and the vitamin C-rich fruit pulp are eaten fresh, and cooking oil is extracted from the oil-rich seeds. The fruit is either collected from the ground, or wooden pegs are hammered into the trunk so the tree can be climbed to collect the fruit. The thick bark of the baobab is composed of tough long fibers that can be used to make ropes, and the majority of trees bear scars from where the bark was cut from ground level to about two meters to obtain this material. The spongy wood consists of sheets of fibre that are collected from dead or living trees, dried in the sun and sold for thatch. Most of these varied uses do not involve the tree being killed, and thus are unlikely to pose a great threat to the baobab.

== Threats and conservation ==
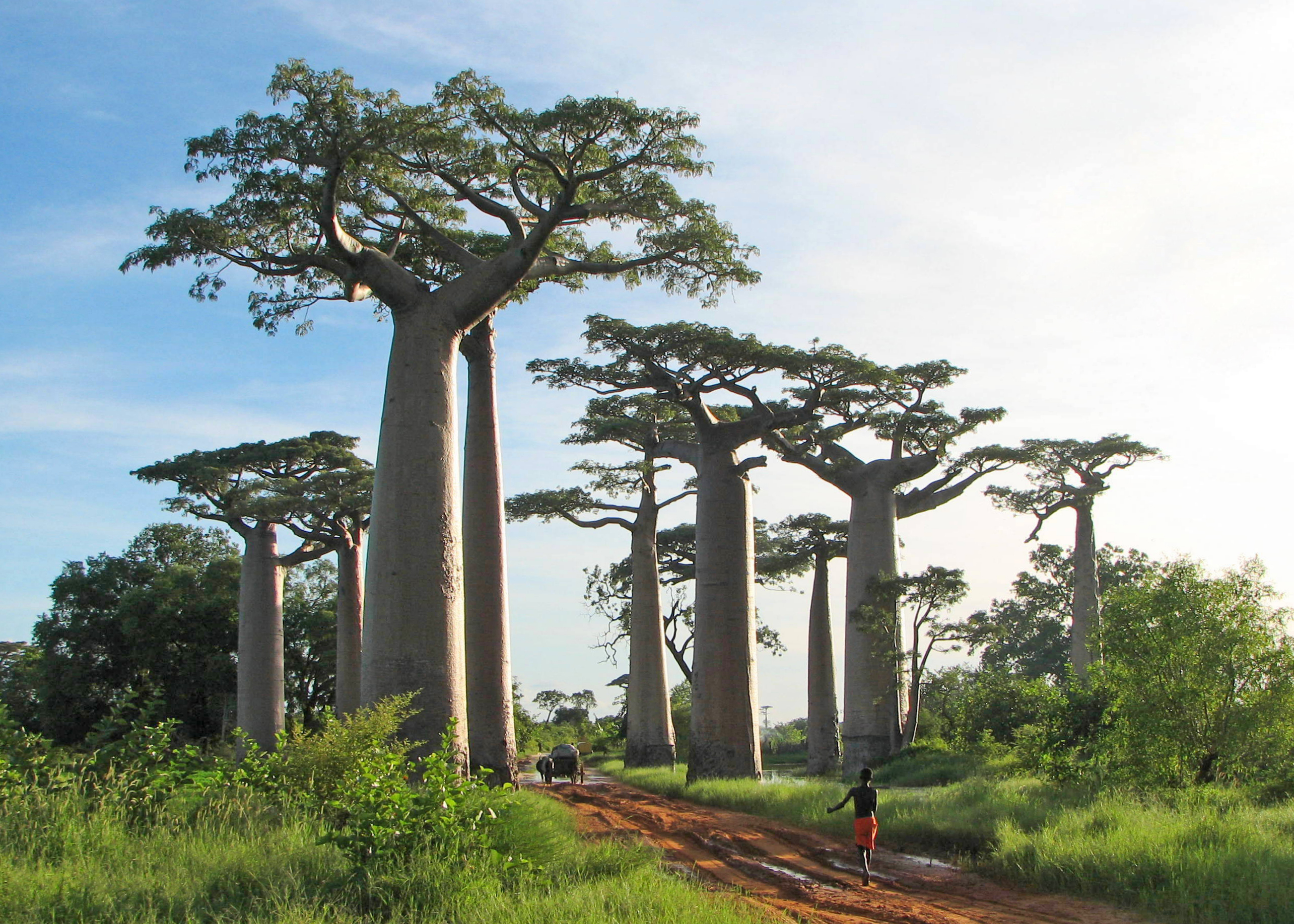
Avenue of the Baobabs, Madagascar

Grandidier's baobab is classified as endangered by the IUCN Red List 2006. Although it is the most heavily exploited of all the Malagasy baobabs, the greatest threat is the transformation of its forest habitat into agricultural land. Within these disturbed habitats, there is a noticeable lack of young trees. Fires, seed predation, competition from weeds, and an altered physical environment might be affecting the ability of the Madagascar baobab to reproduce, which may have devastating consequences for its survival. In 2003 the President of Madagascar vowed to triple the number of protected areas, a measure which may benefit the Grandidier's baobab. The prominent group of Grandidier's baobabs that make up the Avenue of the Baobabs has been a center of local conservation efforts and was granted temporary protected status in July 2007 by the Ministry of Environment, Water and Forests – a step toward making it Madagascar's first natural monument.
