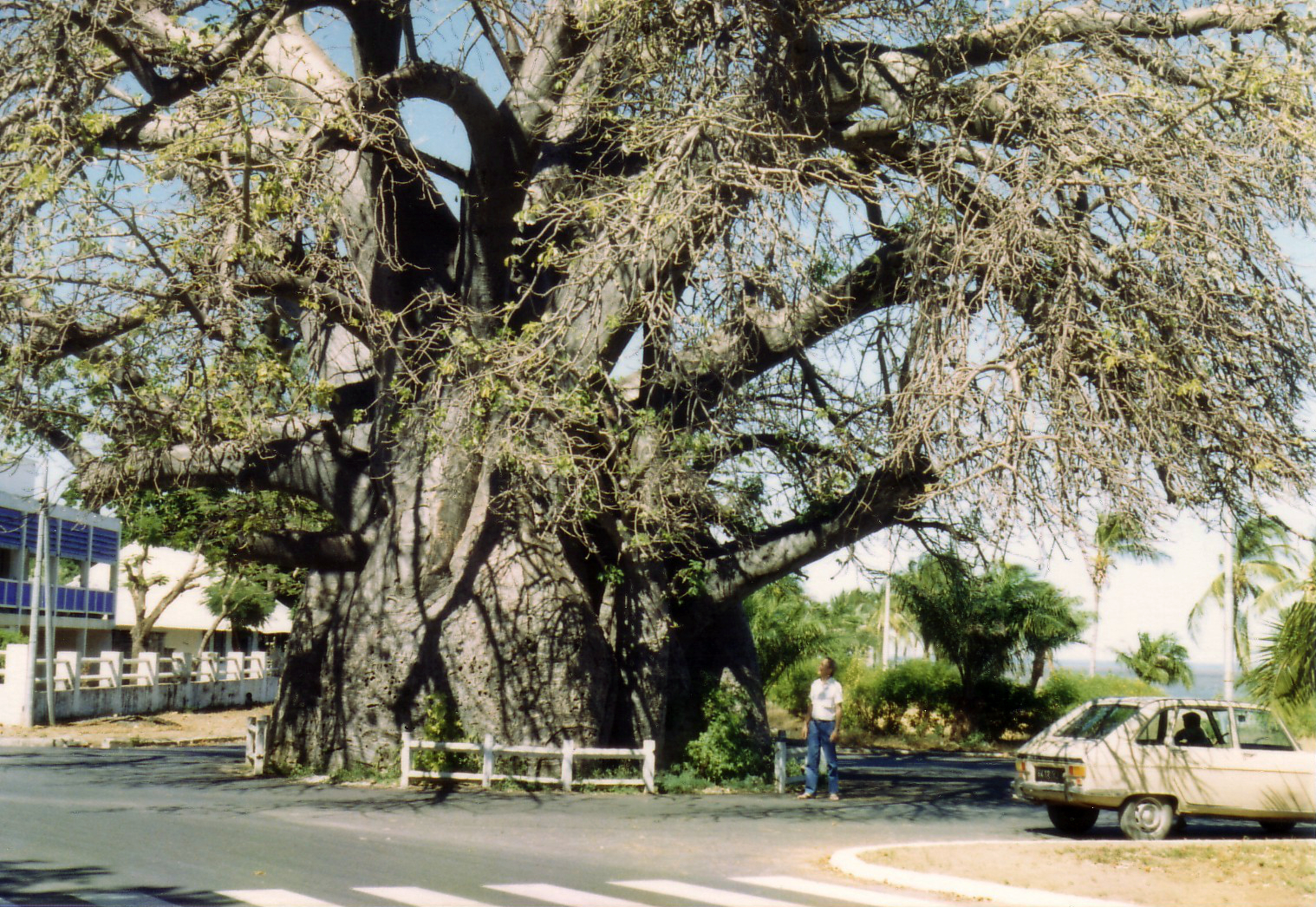

Conservation status
- Least Concern (IUCN 3.1)

Scientific classification
- Kingdom: Plantae
- Clade: Tracheophytes
- Clade: Angiosperms
- Clade: Eudicots
- Clade: Rosids
- Order: Malvales
- Family: Malvaceae
- Genus: Adansonia
- Species: A. madagascariensis

Binomial name
- Adansonia madagascariensis Baill.

= Adansonia madagascariensis =

Species of flowering plant

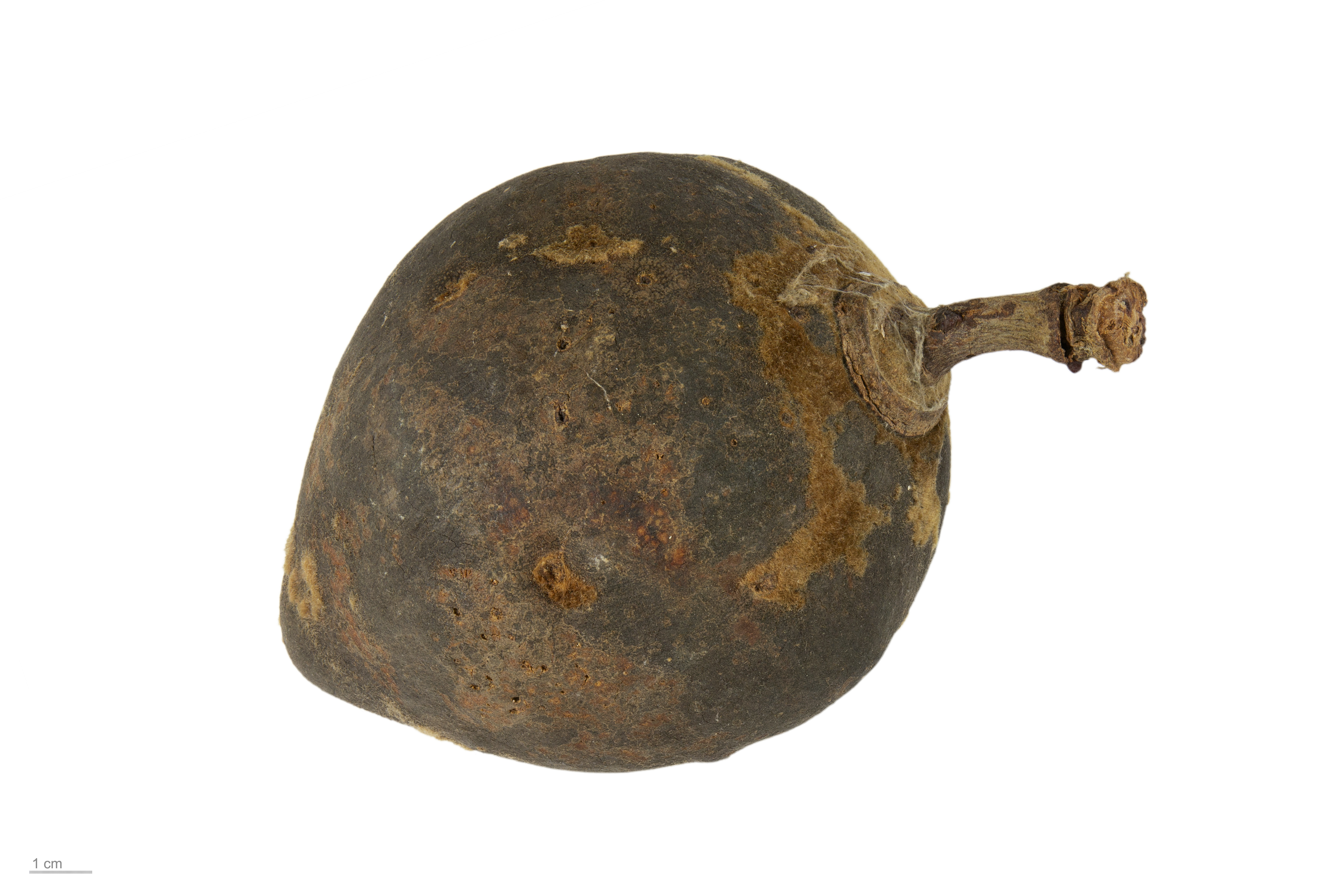
Adansonia madagascariensis (MHNT)

Adansonia madagascariensis or Madagascar baobab is a small to large deciduous tree in the family Malvaceae. It is one of six species of baobab endemic to Madagascar, where it occurs in the Madagascar dry deciduous forests.

== Description ==
This is a tree that grows from 5 metres (16.4 ft) to 20 metres (65.6 ft) tall with a bottle-shaped to cylindrical trunk and irregular crown. The bark is a smooth, pale gray. Leaves are palmate with 5 to 7 leaflets and are present from November to April. Flowers are produced February to April, with the leaves, and are large and fragrant with dark red (rarely yellow) petals. In the centre of the flower is a red stigma atop a dark red style. Flowers open at dusk, are finished blooming by dawn and are pollinated by long-tongued hawkmoths. Fruits ripen by November. They have a tough, thick shell, are rounded and usually less than 10 centimetres (3.9 in) long; smaller than most other baobab species. The trees are often found along watercourses and the thick-shelled fruit are likely dispersed by water.

== Distribution and habitat ==
Madagascar baobab is found on limestone, sandstone or gneiss, usually in dry to moist deciduous forests. The species is found in scattered locations from Antsiranana at the northern tip of Madagascar south along the west coast to the Sambirano region and perhaps Soalala. It was once thought to also be found in the south-east of the country, but those trees have since been determined to be Adansonia za.
