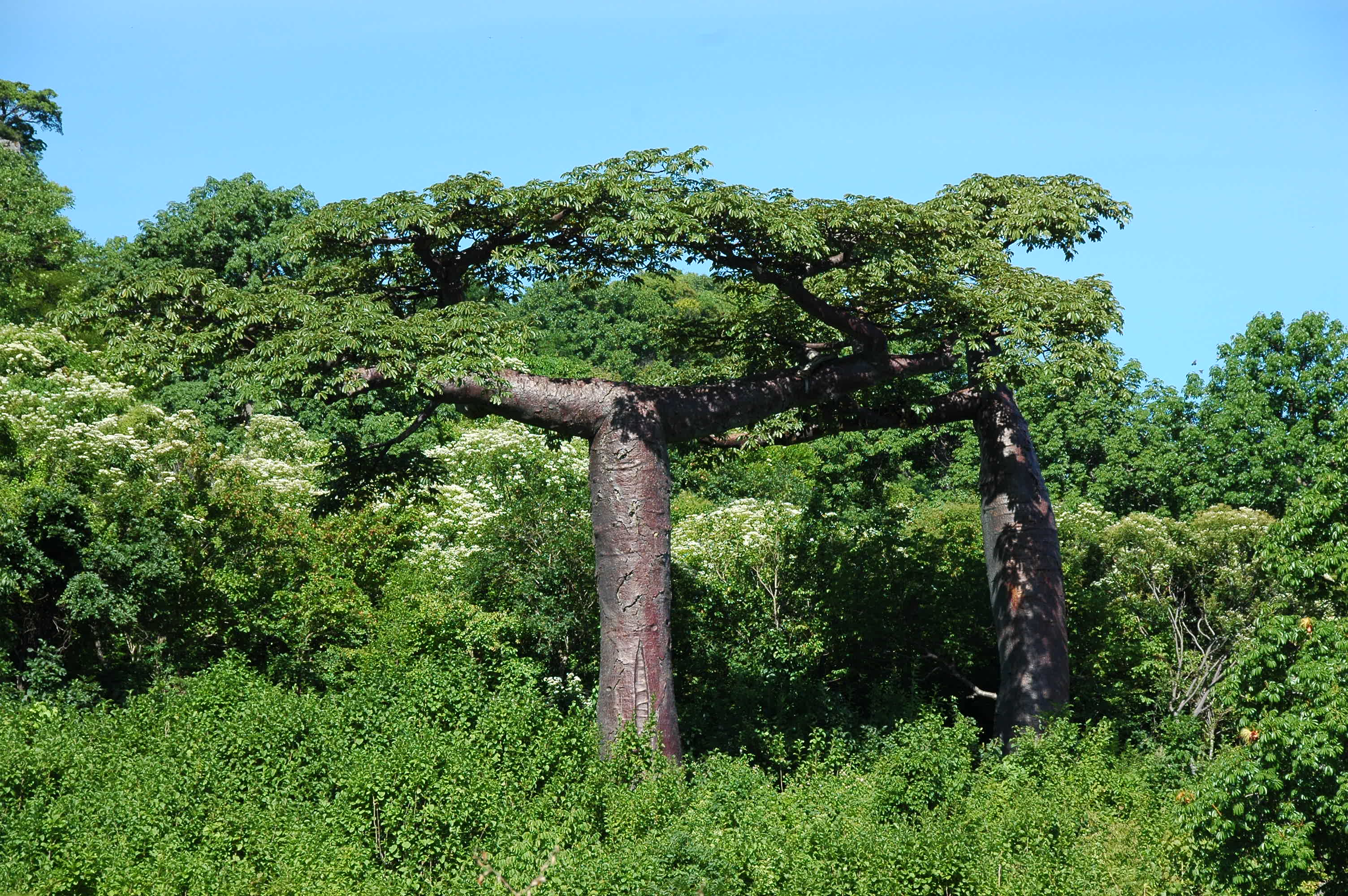

Conservation status
- Endangered (IUCN 3.1)

Scientific classification
- Kingdom: Plantae
- Clade: Tracheophytes
- Clade: Angiosperms
- Clade: Eudicots
- Clade: Rosids
- Order: Malvales
- Family: Malvaceae
- Genus: Adansonia
- Species: A. suarezensis

Binomial name
- Adansonia suarezensis H.Perrier

= Adansonia suarezensis =

Species of flowering plant

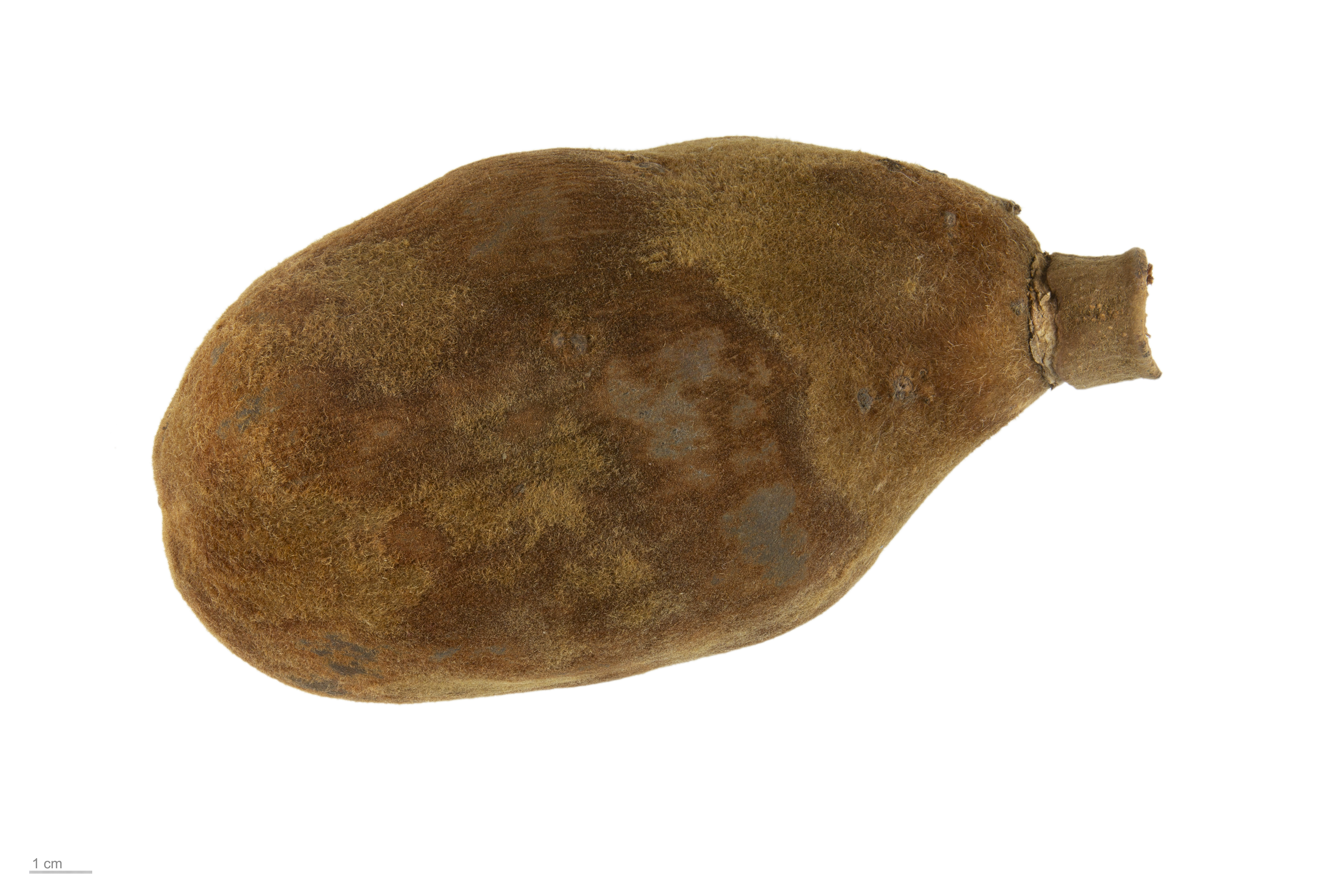
Adansonia suarezensis (MHNT)

Adansonia suarezensis, the Suarez baobab, is an endangered species of Adansonia endemic to Madagascar. It is locally called "bozy" (pronounced "boojy"), the common name used for all baobabs in northern Madagascar.

== Description ==
Adansonia suarezensis is a large tree up to 25 metres (82.0 ft) tall, with a cylindrical trunk up to 2 metres (6.6 ft) in diameter. The bark is smooth and greyish-brown and a photosynthetic greenish layer can be seen underneath. The short, thick branches project horizontally from high on the trunk forming a horizontal crown. The leaves are palmate with 6 to 9 leaflets, yellowish-green, untoothed and deciduous. Large white flowers, drying to reddish brown, are produced after the leaves have fallen. They open at dusk and the reproductive phase is over by dawn. Flowers are pollinated by fruit bats. Flowering occurs in late May to early July. Dangling, elongated fruit that can weigh as much as 1 kilogram (2.2 lb) are ripe by November.

== Distribution and habitat ==
Adansonia suarezensis grows in the northern tip of the island of Madagascar near Antsiranana Bay. A further population has been found growing between the Ankarana Reserve and the Analamerana Reserve in the Forest of Mahory. Its typical habitat is deciduous woodland in limestone areas, but it also grows in disturbed scrub.

== Ecology ==
The flowers are strong smelling, produce copious nectar and are visited by bees, moths and sunbirds, but none of these are big enough to pollinate them. During seasons when fruit are not available, the Madagascan fruit bat feeds on nectar and has been observed to visit the flowers of A. suarezensis and the kapok tree Ceiba pentandra. This bat is believed to be a significant pollinator of the flowers of these trees.

== Status ==
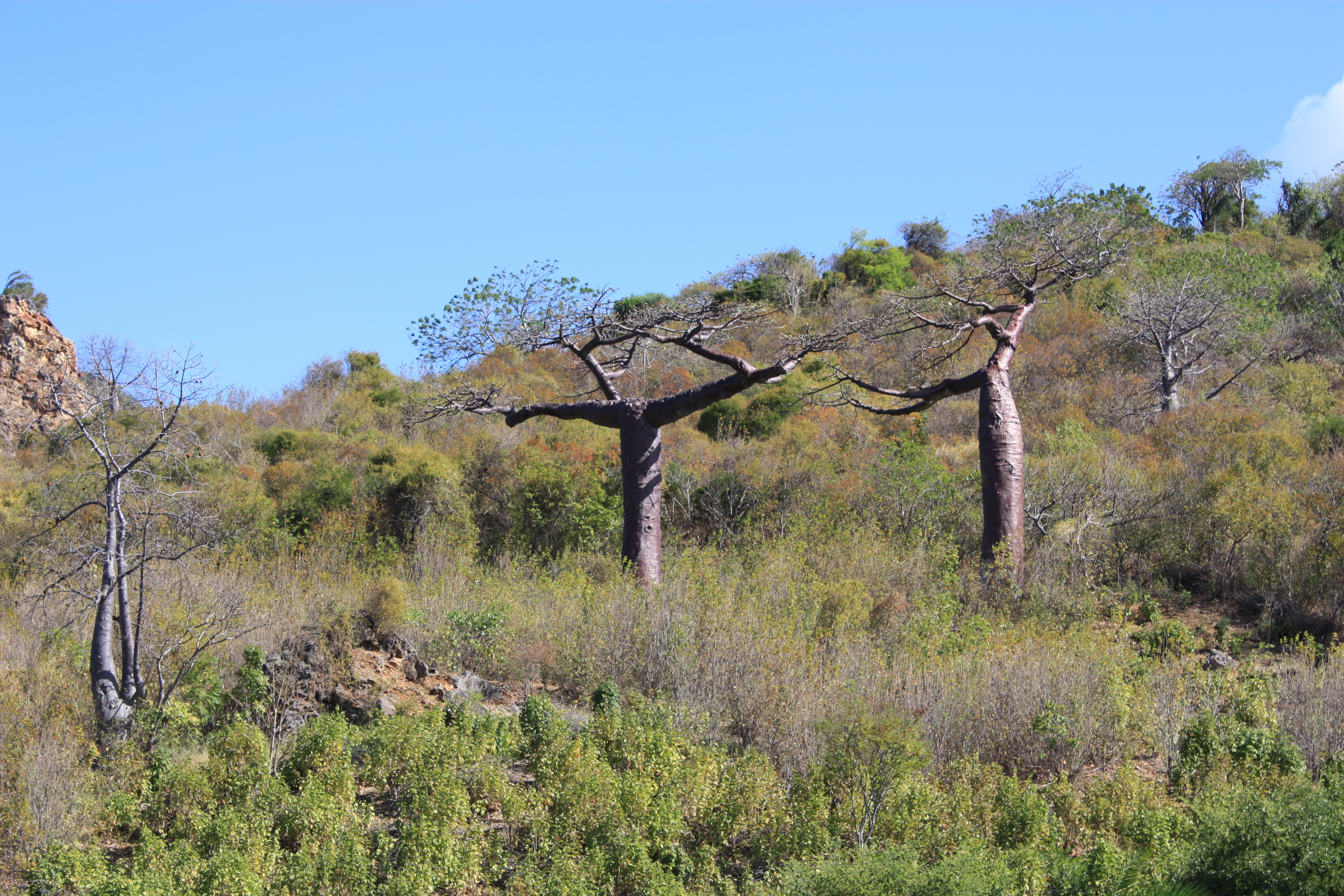

The IUCN lists A. suarezensis as "Endangered" in the Red List of Threatened Species. This is because little natural regeneration has been observed except in the Mahory Forest, and populations are small and fragmented. Numbers are declining, as trees are cleared for urban development, agriculture and grazing or cut for timber and charcoal. No Madagascan animals have been identified as dispersing the seed of this tree.
