= List of carnivorans =

Animals in mammal order Carnivora

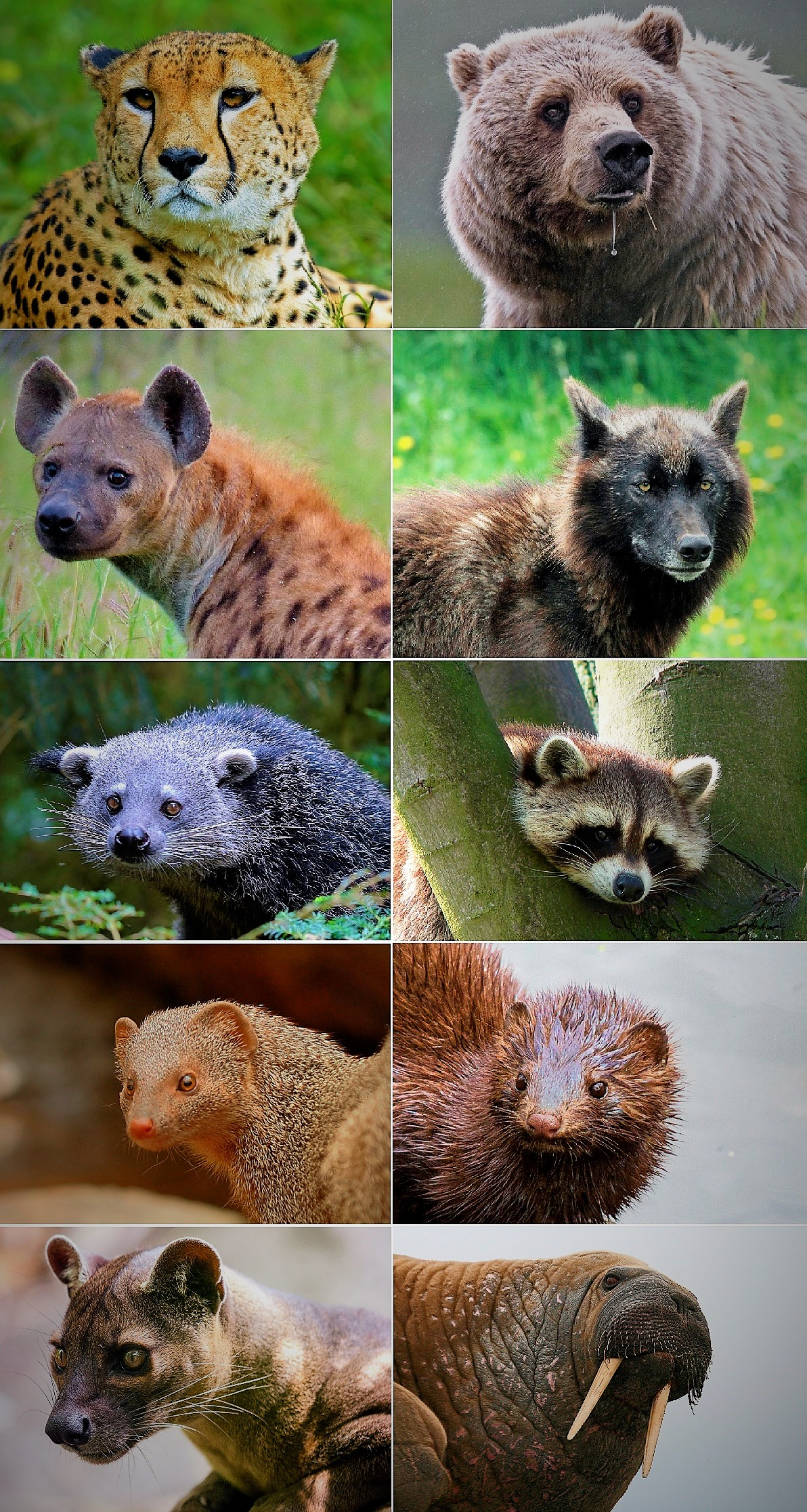
Various carnivorans, with feliforms to the left, and caniforms to the right

Carnivora is an order of placental mammals that have specialized in primarily eating flesh. Members of this order are called carnivorans, or colloquially carnivores, though the term more properly refers to any meat-eating organisms, and some carnivoran species are omnivores or herbivores. Carnivora is the fifth largest order of mammals and currently comprises 291 extant species, which are grouped into 131 genera. Carnivora can be divided into two suborders: the cat-like Feliformia and the dog-like Caniformia, which are differentiated largely based on the structure of their ear bones and cranial features. The majority of feliform species are found in the Old World, though the cats have successfully diversified into the Americas. Members of the Caniformia group are found worldwide. Carnivorans live on every major landmass and in a variety of habitats, including polar regions, hyper-arid deserts, and the open seas. They come in a wide array of body plans in contrasting shapes and sizes, ranging from the 17 cm (7 in) least weasel to the 6 m (20 ft) and 3,700 kg (8,200 lb) male southern elephant seal. Some carnivorans, such as cats, dogs, and the ferret, have been domesticated, resulting in a worldwide distribution.

The feliforms are further subdivided into seven families: Eupleridae, Felidae, Herpestidae, Hyaenidae, Nandiniidae, Prionodontinae, and Viverridae, and include the cats, the hyenas, the mongooses and the viverrids, among others. The caniforms are divided into nine families: Ailuridae, Canidae, Mephitidae, Mustelidae, Odobenidae, Otariidae, Phocidae, Procyonidae, and Ursidae, and include the dogs, bears, raccoons, weasels, and pinnipeds. The exact organization of the species is not fixed, with many recent proposals made based on molecular phylogenetic analysis, including smaller re-categorizations such as promoting the black mongoose subspecies of the slender mongoose to a full species or the 2011 discovery of the Vietnam ferret-badger, as well as larger changes such as formally recognizing the family Eupleridae as separate from Viverridae and Herpestidae in 2003. In addition to the extant species, six species have gone extinct since 1500 CE: the Falkland Islands wolf and South American fox in Canidae, the sea mink and Japanese otter in Mustelidae, the Japanese sea lion in Otariidae, and the Caribbean monk seal in Phocidae.

== Conventions ==
The author citation for the species or genus is given after the scientific name; parentheses around the author citation indicate that this was not the original taxonomic placement. Range maps are provided wherever possible; if a range map is not available, a description of the collective range of species in that genera is provided. Ranges are based on the International Union for Conservation of Nature (IUCN) Red List of Threatened Species unless otherwise noted. All extinct genera or species listed alongside extant species went extinct after 1500 CE, and are indicated by a dagger symbol "†".

== Classification ==
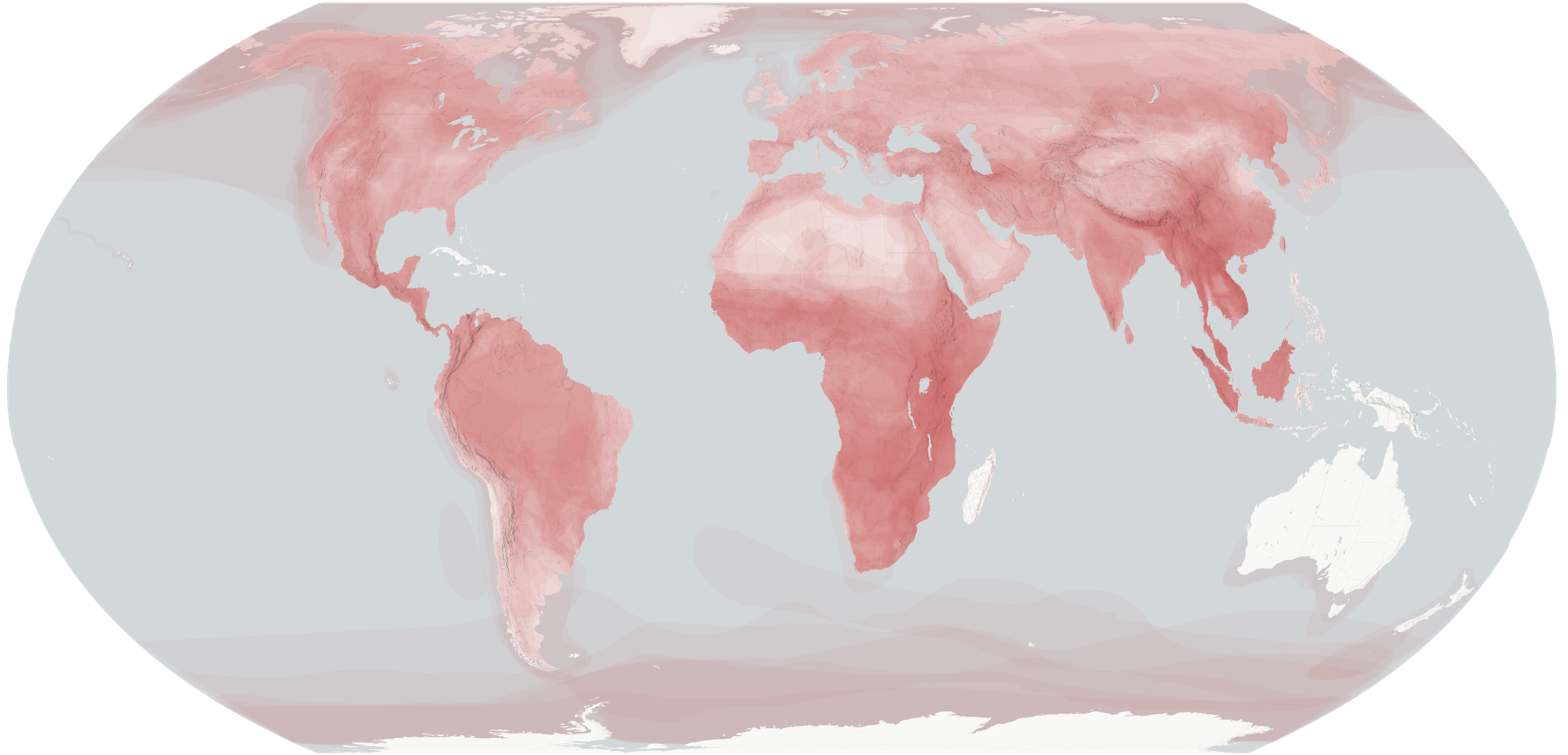
The extant distribution and density of Carnivora species, excluding introductions

The order Carnivora consists of 291 extant species belonging to 131 genera as well the extinct genus Dusicyon, comprising 2 extinct species, and 4 other extinct species, which are the only carnivoran species to go extinct since prehistoric times. This does not include hybrid species (such as wolfdogs or ligers) or extinct prehistoric species. Modern molecular studies indicate that the 131 genera can be grouped into 16 families, split into the Caniformia and Feliformia clades, and several of these families are subdivided into named subfamilies. Three families of semi-aquatic animals, Odobenidae, Otariidae, and Phocidae, are collected into the suborder Pinnipedia.

Suborder Caniformia

- Family Ailuridae
  - Subfamily Ailurinae (red pandas): 1 genus, 1 species
- Family Canidae
  - Subfamily Caninae (wolves and foxes): 14 genera (one extinct), 39 species (two extinct)
- Family Mephitidae (skunks and stink badgers): 4 genera, 12 species
- Family Mustelidae
  - Subfamily Guloninae (martens and wolverines): 4 genera, 10 species
  - Subfamily Helictidinae (ferret-badgers): 1 genus, 5 species
  - Subfamily Ictonychinae (African polecats and grisons): 5 genera, 7 species
  - Subfamily Lutrinae (otters): 7 genera, 14 species (one extinct)
  - Subfamily Melinae (Eurasian badgers): 2 genera, 6 species
  - Subfamily Mellivorinae (honey badger): 1 genus, 1 species
  - Subfamily Mustelinae (weasels and minks): 2 genera, 20 species (one extinct)
  - Subfamily Taxidiinae (American badger): 1 genus, 1 species
- Clade Pinnipedia
  - Family Odobenidae (walrus): 1 genus, 1 species
  - Family Otariidae (eared seals): 7 genera, 16 species (one extinct)
  - Family Phocidae (true seals): 14 genera, 19 species (one extinct)
- Family Procyonidae (raccoons, coatis, olingos, kinkajous): 6 genera, 14 species
- Family Ursidae
  - Subfamily Ailuropodinae (panda bear): 1 genus, 1 species
  - Subfamily Tremarctinae (short-faced bear): 1 genus, 1 species
  - Subfamily Ursinae (bears): 3 genera, 6 species

Suborder Feliformia

- Family Eupleridae
  - Subfamily Euplerinae (civet-like euplerids): 3 genera, 4 species
  - Subfamily Galidiinae (mongoose-like euplerids): 4 genera, 6 species
- Family Felidae
  - Subfamily Felinae (small and medium-sized cats): 12 genera, 34 species
  - Subfamily Pantherinae (large cats): 2 genera, 7 species
- Family Herpestidae
  - Subfamily Herpestinae (European/Asian mongooses): 9 genera, 23 species
  - Subfamily Mungotinae (African mongooses): 6 genera, 11 species
- Family Hyaenidae (hyaenas): 3 genera, 4 species
- Family Nandiniidae (African palm civet): 1 genus, 1 species
- Family Prionodontidae (Asiatic linsangs): 1 genus, 2 species
- Family Viverridae
  - Subfamily Genettinae (genets): 2 genera, 16 species
  - Subfamily Hemigalinae (Southeast Asian civets): 4 genera, 4 species
  - Subfamily Paradoxurinae (Asian civets): 5 genera, 7 species
  - Subfamily Viverrinae (civets): 3 genera, 6 species

- Carnivora
  - Caniformia
    - Canidae
    - - Ursidae
      - - Pinnipedia
          - Phocidae
          - - Odobenidae
            - Otariidae
        - - Mephitidae
          - - Ailuridae
            - - Mustelidae
              - Procyonidae
  - Feliformia
    - Nandiniidae
    - - - Felidae
        - Prionodontidae
      - - Viverridae
        - - Hyaenidae
          - - Eupleridae
            - Herpestidae

== Carnivorans ==
The following classification is based on the taxonomy described by Mammal Species of the World (2005), with augmentation by generally accepted proposals made since using molecular phylogenetic analysis, including smaller re-categorizations such as promoting the black mongoose subspecies of the slender mongoose to a full species or the 2011 discovery of the Vietnam ferret-badger, as well as larger changes such as formally recognizing the family Eupleridae as separate from Viverridae and Herpestidae in 2003.

=== Suborder Caniformia ===
==== Ailuridae ====
The Ailuridae family is composed of one species, commonly called the red panda.

Subfamily Ailurinae – Gray, 1843 – one genus
Name	Authority and species	Range	Size and ecology
Ailurus (Red panda)	F. Cuvier, 1825 One species: A. fulgens (Red panda)	Eastern Himalayas and southwestern China	Size range: 50–64 cm (20–25 in) long, plus 28–59 cm (11–23 in) tail Habitats: Forest and shrubland Diets: Bamboo, as well as fruit, vegetation, lichen, bird eggs, and insects

==== Canidae ====
Members of the Canidae family are canids and include domestic dogs, wolves, coyotes, foxes, jackals, and dingoes, among others. Canidae comprises 37 extant species, divided into 14 genera and placed inside a single extant subfamily, Caninae. Caninae is split into two tribes: Canini, comprising the wolf-like canids, and Vulpini, the fox-like canids.

Subfamily Caninae – G. Fischer de Waldheim, 1817 – fourteen genera
Name	Authority and species	Range	Size and ecology
Atelocynus	Cabrera, 1940 One species: A. microtis (Short-eared dog)	Western Amazon rainforest in South America	Size: 72–100 cm (28–39 in) long, plus 24–35 cm (9–14 in) tail Habitats: Wetlands, forest, and savanna Diet: Fish, insects, and small mammals, as well as fruit, birds, and crabs
Canis	Linnaeus, 1758 Six species: C. aureus (Golden jackal); C. familiaris (Dog); C. latrans (Coyote); C. lupaster (African golden wolf); C. lupus (Grey wolf, pictured); C. simensis (Ethiopian wolf)	North America, Europe, Asia, and Africa (domestic dog worldwide)	Size range: 60 cm (24 in) long, plus 20 cm (8 in) tail (golden jackal) to 160 cm (63 in) long, plus 50 cm (20 in) tail (wolf) Habitats: Forest, desert, shrubland, grassland, savanna, inland wetlands, and rocky areas Diets: A wide variety of foods, including small to large mammals, birds, fish, fruit, carrion, and insects
Cerdocyon	C. E. H. Smith, 1839 One species: C. thous (Crab-eating fox)	Eastern and northern South America	Size: 64 cm (25 in) long, plus 28 cm (11 in) tail Habitats: Forest, savanna, shrubland, grassland, and inland wetlands Diet: Crabs and insects, as well as rodents, birds, turtles, eggs, fruit, and carrion
Chrysocyon	C. E. H. Smith, 1839 One species: C. brachyurus (Maned wolf)	Central South America	Size: 100–130 cm (39–51 in) long, plus 45 cm (18 in) tail Habitats: Forest, wetlands, grassland, shrubland, and savanna Diet: Fruit, arthropods, and small and medium vertebrates
Cuon	Hodgson, 1838 One species: C. alpinus (Dhole)	Southeastern Asia	Size: 90 cm (35 in) long, plus 40–45 cm (16–18 in) tail Habitats: Forest, grassland, and shrubland Diet: Ungulates, as well as small rodents and hares
Dusicyon†	C. E. H. Smith, 1839 Two species: D. australis (Falkland Islands wolf, pictured)†; D. avus (South American fox)†	Southern South America	Size range: Unknown Habitats: Grassland and shrubland Diets: Unknown
Lupulella	Hilzheimer, 1906 Two species: L. adustus (Side-striped jackal, pictured); L. mesomelas (Black-backed jackal)	Sub-Saharan Africa	Size range: 60 cm (24 in) long, plus 16 cm (6 in) tail (black-backed jackal) to 81 cm (32 in) long, plus 41 cm (16 in) tail (side-striped jackal) Habitats: Forest, shrubland, savanna, grassland, inland wetlands, desert, and intertidal marine Diets: Small to medium-sized mammals, birds, and fruit, as well as insects, grass, and carrion
Lycalopex (South American fox)	Burmeister, 1854 Six species: L. culpeo (Culpeo); L. fulvipes (Darwin's fox); L. griseus (South American gray fox, pictured); L. gymnocercus (Pampas fox); L. sechurae (Sechuran fox); L. vetulus (Hoary fox)	South America	Size range: 44 cm (17 in) long, plus 18 cm (7 in) tail (Darwin's fox) to 132 cm (52 in) long, plus 41 cm (16 in) tail (culpeo) Habitats: Forest, rocky areas, grassland, shrubland, savanna, and desert Diets: Small mammals, birds, insects, and fruit, as well as livestock and carrion
Lycaon	Brookes, 1827 One species: L. pictus (African wild dog)	Scattered areas of Africa. Extant regions in red; probably extant region in yellow.	Size: 76–112 cm (30–44 in) long, plus 30–42 cm (12–17 in) tail Habitats: Forest, grassland, shrubland, savanna, and desert Diet: Medium-sized antelope
Nyctereutes	Temminck, 1839 Two species: N. procyonoides (Common raccoon dog); N. viverrinus (Japanese raccoon dog, pictured)	Eastern Asia, introduced to Central and Eastern Europe	Size range: 49–71 cm (19–28 in) long, plus 15–23 cm (6–9 in) tail Habitats: Forest, grassland, and shrubland Diets: Insects, rodents, amphibians, birds, fish, and reptiles, as well as fruit, nuts, and berries
Otocyon	Müller, 1835 One species: O. megalotis (Bat-eared fox)	Southern and Eastern Africa	Size: 46–61 cm (18–24 in) long, plus 23–34 cm (9–13 in) tail Habitats: Grassland, shrubland, and savanna Diet: Harvester termites as well as other arthropods
Speothos	Lund, 1839 One species: S. venaticus (Bush dog)	Northern South America	Size: 57–75 cm (22–30 in) long, plus 12–15 cm (5–6 in) tail Habitats: Shrubland, forest, grassland, and savanna Diet: Small and medium mammals, as well as birds, reptiles, and fruit
Urocyon	Baird, 1857 Two species: U. cinereoargenteus (Gray fox, pictured); U. littoralis (Island fox)	North America and Central America	Size range: 46 cm (18 in) long, plus 12 cm (5 in) tail (island fox) to 66 cm (26 in) long, plus 44 cm (17 in) tail (gray fox) Habitats: Forest, grassland, shrubland, and intertidal marine Diets: Small mammals, fruit, insects, birds, eggs, crabs, and lizards
Vulpes (true fox)	Garsault, 1764 Twelve species: V. bengalensis (Bengal fox); V. cana (Blanford's fox); V. chama (Cape fox); V. corsac (Corsac fox); V. ferrilata (Tibetan sand fox); V. lagopus (Arctic fox); V. macrotis (Kit fox); V. pallida (Pale fox); V. rueppellii (Rüppell's fox); V. velox (Swift fox); V. vulpes (Red fox, pictured); V. zerda (Fennec fox)	North America, Europe, Asia, Africa, and Australia	Size range: 33 cm (13 in) long, plus 13 cm (5 in) tail (fennec fox) to 75 cm (30 in) long, plus 43 cm (17 in) tail (arctic fox) Habitats: Shrubland, grassland, inland wetlands, forest, desert, rocky areas, savanna, desert, and coastal marine Diets: Small mammals, reptiles, birds, and insects, as well as fish, fruit, berries, and succulents

==== Mephitidae ====
Members of the Mephitidae family are mephetids and include the skunks and stink badgers. Mephitidae comprises twelve extant species, divided into four genera, and is not split into subfamilies.

Not assigned to a named subfamily – four genera
Name	Authority and species	Range	Size and ecology
Conepatus (hog-nosed skunk)	Gray, 1837 Four species: C. chinga (Molina's hog-nosed skunk); C. humboldtii (Humboldt's hog-nosed skunk); C. leuconotus (American hog-nosed skunk); C. semistriatus (Striped hog-nosed skunk, pictured)	Southern North America and South America	Size range: 20 cm (8 in) long, plus 13 cm (5 in) tail (Molina's hog-nosed skunk) to 51 cm (20 in) long, plus 41 cm (16 in) tail (American hog-nosed skunk) Habitats: Shrubland, grassland, savanna, forest, and rocky areas Diets: Omnivorous; primarily eats invertebrates, rodents, small reptiles, and eggs
Mephitis (skunk)	Geoffroy, 1795 Two species: M. macroura (Hooded skunk); M. mephitis (Striped skunk, pictured)	North America	Size range: 19 cm (7 in) long, plus 35 cm (14 in) tail (hooded skunk) to 82 cm (32 in) long, plus 40 cm (16 in) tail (striped skunk) Habitats: Desert, shrubland, rocky areas, grassland, savanna, and forest Diets: Rodents, Insects, fruit, small vertebrates, vegetation, and bird eggs
Mydaus (stink badger)	F. Cuvier, 1821 Two species: M. javanensis (Sunda stink badger, pictured); M. marchei (Palawan stink badger)	Western Philippines, Indonesia, and Malaysia	Size range: 32 cm (13 in) long, plus 1 cm tail (Palawan stink badger) to 51 cm (20 in) long, plus 8 cm (3 in) tail (Sunda stink badger) Habitats: Forest, shrubland, grassland, and introduced vegetation Diets: Birds' eggs, carrion, insects, worms, arthropods, and plants
Spilogale (spotted skunk)	Gray, 1865 Four species: S. angustifrons (Southern spotted skunk); S. gracilis (Western spotted skunk); S. putorius (Eastern spotted skunk, pictured); S. pygmaea (Pygmy spotted skunk)	North America	Size range: 11 cm (4 in) long, plus 7 cm (3 in) tail (pygmy spotted skunk) to 37 cm (15 in) long, plus 21 cm (8 in) tail (western spotted skunk) Habitats: Inland wetlands, grassland, shrubland, rocky areas, savanna, and forest, rocky areas, marine coastal/supratidal Diets: Omnivorous; primarily eats invertebrates, small mammals, fruit, grain, birds, carrion, and bird eggs

==== Mustelidae ====
Members of the Mustelidae family are mustelids and include weasels, badgers, otters, ferrets, martens, minks, and wolverines, among others. Mustelidae is the largest family in Carnivora, and comprises 62 extant species, divided into 23 genera. These genera are split into 8 subfamilies: Guloninae, martens and wolverines; Helictidinae, ferret-badgers; Ictonychinae, African polecats and grisons; Lutrinae, otters; Melinae, Eurasian badgers; Mellivorinae, the honey badger; Mustelinae, weasels and minks; and Taxidiinae, the American badger.

Subfamily Guloninae – Gray, 1825 – four genera
Name	Authority and species	Range	Size and ecology
Eira	Hamilton Smith, 1842 One species: E. barbara (Tayra)	Central America, Trinidad in the Caribbean, and northern South America	Size: 60–70 cm (24–28 in) long, plus 35–45 cm (14–18 in) tail Habitats: Forest and savanna Diet: Fruit, carrion, small vertebrates, insects, and honey
Gulo	Pallas, 1780 One species: G. gulo (Wolverine)	Arctic North America, Europe, and Asia	Size: 70–105 cm (28–41 in) long, plus 18–26 cm (7–10 in) tail Habitats: Rocky areas, shrubland, forest, and grassland Diet: Carrion and small to large mammals
Martes (marten)	Pinel, 1792 Seven species: M. americana (American marten); M. flavigula (Yellow-throated marten); M. foina (Beech marten); M. gwatkinsii (Nilgiri marten); M. martes (European pine marten, pictured); M. melampus (Japanese marten); M. zibellina (Sable)	North America and Eurasia	Size range: 38 cm (15 in) long, plus 9 cm (4 in) tail (sable) to 72 cm (28 in) long, plus 48 cm (19 in) tail (yellow-throated marten) Habitats: Forest, grassland, rocky areas, and shrubland Diets: Rodents and small mammals, as well as birds, amphibians, insects, fruit, berries, and carrion
Pekania	Gray, 1865 One species: P. pennanti (Fisher)	Northern North America	Size: 75–120 cm (30–47 in) long, plus 31–41 cm (12–16 in) tail Habitat: Forest Diet: Small to medium mammals, birds, and carrion

Subfamily Helictidinae – Gray, 1865 – one genus
Name	Authority and species	Range	Size and ecology
Melogale (ferret-badger)	I. Saint-Hilaire, 1831 Five species: M. cucphuongensis (Vietnam ferret-badger); M. everetti (Bornean ferret-badger); M. moschata (Chinese ferret-badger); M. orientalis (Javan ferret-badger); M. personata (Burmese ferret-badger, pictured)	Eastern and Southeastern Asia	Size range: 30 cm (12 in) long, plus 15 cm (6 in) tail (Chinese ferret-badger) to 44 cm (17 in) long, plus 23 cm (9 in) tail (Bornean ferret-badger, Burmese ferret-badger) Habitats: Forest, shrubland, and grassland Diets: Invertebrates, amphibians, insects, fruit, and carrion

Subfamily Ictonychinae – Gray, 1865 – five genera
Name	Authority and species	Range	Size and ecology
Galictis (grison)	Bell, 1826 Two species: G. cuja (Lesser grison); G. vittata (Greater grison, pictured)	South America	Size range: 28 cm (11 in) long, plus 12 cm (5 in) tail (lesser grison) to 76 cm (30 in) long, plus 30 cm (12 in) tail (greater grison) Habitats: Inland wetlands, forest, grassland, and savanna Diets: Small mammals, birds, lizards, amphibians, eggs, and fruit
Ictonyx (striped polecat)	Kaup, 1835 Two species: I. libycus (Saharan striped polecat); I. striatus (Striped polecat, pictured)	Africa	Size range: 28 cm (11 in) long, plus 20 cm (8 in) tail (striped polecat) to 47 cm (19 in) long, plus 19 cm (7 in) tail (Saharan striped polecat) Habitats: Grassland, savanna, desert, and shrubland Diets: Rodents, small mammals, birds, fish, and insects
Lyncodon	Gervais, 1845 One species: L. patagonicus (Patagonian weasel)	Argentina	Size: 30–35 cm (12–14 in) long, plus 6–9 cm (2–4 in) tail Habitats: Shrubland, grassland, and forest Diet: Rodents and birds
Poecilogale	Thomas, 1883 One species: P. albinucha (African striped weasel)	Southern Africa	Size: 25–36 cm (10–14 in) long, plus 13–23 cm (5–9 in) tail Habitats: Shrubland, forest, savanna, and grassland Diet: Small mammals, rodents, and birds, as well as snakes and insects
Vormela	Blasius, 1884 One species: V. peregusna (Marbled polecat)	Southeastern Europe and central Asia	Size: 28–48 cm (11–19 in) long, plus 14–20 cm (6–8 in) tail Habitats: Desert, rocky areas, grassland, and shrubland Diet: Rodents and birds

Subfamily Lutrinae – Bonaparte, 1838 – seven genera
Name	Authority and species	Range	Size and ecology
Aonyx	Lesson, 1827 Three species: A. capensis (African clawless otter, pictured); A. cinereus (Asian small-clawed otter); A. congicus (Congo clawless otter)	Sub-Saharan Africa and Southeastern Asia	Size range: 40 cm (16 in) long, plus 25 cm (10 in) tail (Asian small-clawed otter) to 95 cm (37 in) long, plus 60 cm (24 in) tail (African clawless otter) Habitats: Intertidal marine, coastal marine, inland wetlands, forest, shrubland, neritic marine, and grassland Diets: Crabs, molluscs, insects, and small fish, as well as rodents, snakes, and amphibians
Enhydra	Fleming, 1828 One species: E. lutris (Sea otter)	Western North American coast, eastern Russian coast, northern Japanese coast on northern Pacific coasts	Size: 55–130 cm (22–51 in) long, plus 12–33 cm (5–13 in) tail Habitats: Neritic marine and oceanic marine Diet: Marine invertebrates, as well as fish
Hydrictis	Pocock, 1921 One species: H. maculicollis (Spotted-necked otter)	Sub-Saharan Africa	Size: 57–69 cm (22–27 in) long, plus 33–44 cm (13–17 in) tail Habitats: Inland wetlands, neritic marine, forest, coastal marine, and intertidal marine Diet: Frogs, crabs and small water birds
Lontra	Gray, 1843 Four species: L. canadensis (North American river otter, pictured); L. felina (Marine otter); L. longicaudis (Neotropical otter); L. provocax (Southern river otter)	North and South America	Size range: 50 cm (20 in) long, plus 37 cm (15 in) tail (neotropical otter) to 107 cm (42 in) long, plus 46 cm (18 in) tail (North American river otter) Habitats: Inland wetlands, coastal marine, neritic marine, intertidal marine, and oceanic marine Diets: Fish, crustaceans, and molluscs, as well as insects, amphibians, and birds
Lutra	Brisson, 1762 Three species: L. lutra (Eurasian otter, pictured); L. nippon (Japanese otter)†; L. sumatrana (Hairy-nosed otter)	Eurasia and North Africa	Size range: 50 cm (20 in) long, plus 35 cm (14 in) tail (hairy-nosed otter) to 70 cm (28 in) long, plus 40 cm (16 in) tail (Eurasian otter) Habitats: Inland wetlands, forest, grassland, coastal marine, neretic marine, intertidal marine, and shrubland Diets: Fish, as well as insects, reptiles, amphibians, birds, small mammals, and crustaceans
Lutrogale	(Gray, 1865) One species: L. perspicillata (Smooth-coated otter)	Iraq, and southern and southeastern Asia	Size: 65–79 cm (26–31 in) long, plus 40–50 cm (16–20 in) tail Habitats: Inland wetlands, forest, grassland, coastal marine, neritic marine, intertidal marine, and shrubland Diet: Fish, as well as shrimp, crabs, and insects
Pteronura	Gray, 1837 One species: P. brasiliensis (Giant otter)	Northern and central South America	Size: 96–123 cm (38–48 in) long, plus 45–65 cm (18–26 in) tail Habitats: Inland wetlands, coastal marine, neritic marine, and forest Diet: Fish, as well as caiman and turtles

Subfamily Melinae – Bonaparte, 1838 – two genera
Name	Authority and species	Range	Size and ecology
Arctonyx	F.Cuvier, 1825 Three species: A. albogularis (Northern hog badger); A. collaris (Greater hog badger, pictured); A. hoevenii (Sumatran hog badger)	Eastern and southeastern Asia	Size range: 55–70 cm (22–28 in) long, plus 12–17 cm (5–7 in) tail Habitats: Forest, grassland, shrubland, and savanna Diets: Believed to primarily eat worms
Meles	Brisson, 1762 Three species: M. anakuma (Japanese badger); M. leucurus (Asian badger); M. meles (European badger, pictured)	Eurasia	Size range: 49 cm (19 in) long, plus 13 cm (5 in) tail (Asian badger) to 90 cm (35 in) long, plus 20 cm (8 in) tail (European badger) Habitats: Grassland, forest, desert, and shrubland Diets: Omnivorous; eats fruit, nuts, plants, earthworms, insects, eggs, carrion, and small mammals

Subfamily Mellivorinae – Gray, 1865 – one genus
Name	Authority and species	Range	Size and ecology
Mellivora	Gottlieb Conrad Christian Storr, 1780 One species: M. capensis (Honey badger)	Africa, Middle East, and India	Size: 73–96 cm (29–38 in) long, plus 14–23 cm (6–9 in) tail Habitats: Forest, shrubland, savanna, and desert Diet: Smaller mammals

Subfamily Mustelinae – G. Fischer de Waldheim, 1817 – two genera
Name	Authority and species	Range	Size and ecology
Mustela (weasel)	Linnaeus, 1758 Fifteen species: M. altaica (Mountain weasel); M. erminea (Stoat, pictured); M. eversmanii (Steppe polecat); M. furo (Ferret); M. itatsi (Japanese weasel); M. kathiah (Yellow-bellied weasel); M. lutreola (European mink); M. lutreolina (Indonesian mountain weasel); M. nigripes (Black-footed ferret); M. nivalis (Least weasel); M. nudipes (Malayan weasel); M. putorius (European polecat); M. sibirica (Siberian weasel); M. strigidorsa (Back-striped weasel); M. subpalmata (Egyptian weasel)	North America, Europe, and Asia	Size range: 11 cm (4 in) long, plus 1 cm tail (least weasel) to 56 cm (22 in) long, plus 18 cm (7 in) tail (steppe polecat) Habitats: Forest, inland wetlands, rocky areas, coastal marine, shrubland, grassland, urban Diets: Small mammals, as well as fruit, earthworms, invertebrates, lizards, amphibians, fish, carrion, eggs, and birds
Neogale	Gray, 1865 Five species: N. africana (Amazon weasel); N. felipei (Colombian weasel); N. frenata (Long-tailed weasel); N. vison (American mink, pictured); N. macrodon (Sea mink)†	North America and South America; introduced to Eurasia	Size range: 31 cm (12 in) long, plus 14 cm (6 in) tail (American mink) to 91 cm (36 in) long, plus 25 cm (10 in) tail (sea mink) Habitats: Inland wetlands, forest, and shrubland; formerly intertidal marine, neritic marine, and coastal marine Diets: Fish, amphibians, crustaceans, muskrats, and small mammals

Subfamily Taxidiinae – Pocock, 1920 – one genus
Name	Authority and species	Range	Size and ecology
Taxidea	Horsfield, 1839 One species: T. taxus (American badger)	Mexico, United States and southern Canada	Size: 42–72 cm (17–28 in) long, plus 10–16 cm (4–6 in) tail Habitats: Forest, grassland, and shrubland Diet: Fossorial rodents, as well as scorpions, insects, snakes, lizards, and birds

==== Clade Pinnipedia ====
Pinnipedia is an infraorder of carnivores, composed of seals, sea lions, and the walrus. A member of this group is called a pinniped or a seal. The clade contains three families: Odobenidae, comprising the walrus; Otariidae, the eared seals, split between the sea lions and fur seals; and Phocidae, the earless or true seals. Odobenidae and Otariidae are combined into the superfamily Otarioidea, with Phocidae in Phocoidea. These families are not subdivided into subfamilies.

===== Odobenidae =====
The Odobenidae family is composed of a single extant species, the walrus.

Not assigned to a named subfamily – one genus
Name	Authority and species	Range	Size and ecology
Odobenus	Brisson, 1762 One species: O. rosmarus (Walrus)	Arctic Ocean and subarctic seas	Size: Male: 270–356 cm (106–140 in) long; 800–1,700 kg (1,764–3,748 lb); Female: 225–312 cm (89–123 in) long; 400–1,250 kg (882–2,756 lb) Habitats: Neritic marine, oceanic marine, intertidal marine, coastal marine, and other Diet: Bivalve molluscs, as well as other invertebrates, slow-moving fish, and occasionally birds, seals, and other marine mammals

===== Otariidae =====
Members of the Otariidae family are otariids, or colloquially eared seals. There are sixteen species of sea lions and fur seals in Otariidae, divided into seven genera.

Not assigned to a named subfamily – seven genera
Name	Authority and species	Range	Size and ecology
Arctocephalus	Geoffroy, F. Cuvier, 1826 Eight species: A. australis (South American fur seal); A. forsteri (New Zealand fur seal); A. galapagoensis (Galápagos fur seal); A. gazella (Antarctic fur seal); A. philippii (Juan Fernández fur seal); A. pusillus (Brown fur seal, pictured); A. townsendi (Guadalupe fur seal); A. tropicalis (Subantarctic fur seal)	Antarctic Ocean and southern seas and coasts	Size range: 100 cm (39 in) long and 30 kg (66 lb) (New Zealand fur seal females) to 227 cm (89 in) long and 360 kg (794 lb) (brown fur seal males) Habitats: Forest, shrubland, neritic marine, oceanic marine, intertidal marine, and coastal marine Diets: A wide variety of cephalopods, fish, and birds, and some penguins
Callorhinus	Gray, 1859 One species: C. ursinus (Northern fur seal)	Northern Pacific Ocean (dark blue indicates breeding grounds)	Size: Male: 213 cm (84 in) long; 180–275 kg (397–606 lb); Female: 142 cm (56 in) long; 40–50 kg (88–110 lb) Habitats: Neritic marine, oceanic marine, intertidal marine, and coastal marine Diet: A variety of epipelagic and vertically migrating mesopelagic fish and squid
Eumetopias	Gill, 1866 One species: E. jubatus (Steller sea lion)	Northern Pacific Ocean (red indicates breeding grounds)	Size: Male: 300–340 cm (118–134 in) long; 1,120 kg (2,469 lb); Female: 230–290 cm (91–114 in) long; 350 kg (772 lb) Habitats: Neritic marine, oceanic marine, intertidal marine, and coastal marine Diet: A variety of fish and cephalopods, as well as northern fur seal, harbor seals, and ringed seals
Neophoca	Gray, 1866 One species: N. cinerea (Australian sea lion)	Southwestern Australian coast	Size: Male: 180–250 cm (71–98 in) long; 180–250 kg (397–551 lb); Female: 130–180 cm (51–71 in) long; 61–105 kg (134–231 lb) Habitats: Neritic marine, oceanic marine, intertidal marine, and coastal marine Diet: Cephalopods, fish, and crustaceans
Otaria	Péron, 1816 One species: O. flavescens (South American sea lion)	Southeastern and western South American coast and islands	Size: Male: 210–260 cm (83–102 in) long; 300–350 kg (661–772 lb); Female: 150–200 cm (59–79 in) long; 170 kg (375 lb) Habitats: Inland wetlands, neritic marine, oceanic marine, intertidal marine, and coastal marine Diet: A wide variety of benthic fish, pelagic fish, and invertebrates
Phocarctos	Peters, 1866 One species: P. hookeri (New Zealand sea lion)	Southern New Zealand coast and islands	Size: Male: 210–270 cm (83–106 in) long; 300–450 kg (661–992 lb); Female: 180–200 cm (71–79 in) long; 90–165 kg (198–364 lb) Habitats: Forest, shrubland, neritic marine, oceanic marine, intertidal marine, and coastal marine Diet: A wide variety of fish, cephalopods, and crustaceans, as well as penguins
Zalophus	Gill, 1866 Three species: Z. californianus (California sea lion, pictured); Z. japonicus (Japanese sea lion†); Z. wollebaeki (Galápagos sea lion)	Pacific North American coast and Galápagos Islands	Size range: 160 cm (63 in) long and 275 kg (606 lb) (California sea lion) to 250 cm (98 in) long and 560 kg (1,235 lb) (Japanese sea lion males) Habitats: Neritic marine, oceanic marine, intertidal marine, and coastal marine Diets: A variety of fish and squid

===== Phocidae =====
Members of the Phocidae family are phocids, or colloquially earless or true seals. There are nineteen species of seals in Phocidae, divided into fourteen genera.

Not assigned to a named subfamily – 14 genera
Name	Authority and species	Range	Size and ecology
Cystophora	Agardh, 1841 One species: C. cristata (Hooded seal)	Central and western North Atlantic ocean (blue indicates breeding grounds)	Size: Male: 250–270 cm (98–106 in) long; 200–400 kg (441–882 lb); Female: 200–220 cm (79–87 in) long; 145–300 kg (320–661 lb) Habitats: Neritic marine, oceanic marine, intertidal marine, and coastal marine Diet: Fish and invertebrates throughout the water column
Erignathus	Gill, 1866 One species: E. barbatus (Bearded seal)	Arctic ocean	Size: 200–260 cm (79–102 in) long; 200–360 kg (441–794 lb) tail Habitats: Neritic marine, oceanic marine, and intertidal marine Diet: Crabs, shrimp, clams, snails, benthic and demersal fish, and spoon worms
Halichoerus	Nilsson, 1820 One species: H. grypus (Grey seal)	Shores of the North Atlantic Ocean	Size: Male: 195–230 cm (77–91 in) long; 170–310 kg (375–683 lb); Female: 165–195 cm (65–77 in) long; 105–186 kg (231–410 lb) Habitats: Neritic marine, oceanic marine, intertidal marine, and coastal marine Diet: Benthic and demersal fish
Histriophoca	Gill, 1873 One species: H. fasciata (Ribbon seal)	Arctic and subarctic regions of the North Pacific Ocean (blue indicates reduced summer range)	Size: 165–175 cm (65–69 in) long; 72–90 kg (159–198 lb) Habitats: Neritic marine and oceanic marine Diet: Fish, crustaceans, and other invertebrates
Hydrurga	Gistel, 1848 One species: H. leptonyx (Leopard seal)	Antarctic Ocean	Size: Male: 250–320 cm (98–126 in) long; 200–455 kg (441–1,003 lb); Female: 241–338 cm (95–133 in) long; 225–591 kg (496–1,303 lb) Habitats: Neritic marine, oceanic marine, intertidal marine, and coastal marine Diet: Krill, fish, squid, penguins, other seabirds, and juvenile seals
Leptonychotes	Gill, 1872 One species: L. weddellii (Weddell seal)	Coastal Antarctic Ocean	Size: 280–330 cm (110–130 in) long; 400–600 kg (882–1,323 lb) Habitats: Neritic marine, oceanic marine, intertidal marine, and coastal marine Diet: Cod icefish, as well as Antarctic toothfish, lanternfish, and cephalopods
Lobodon	Gray, 1844 One species: L. carcinophaga (Crabeater seal)	Antarctic Ocean	Size: Male: 203–241 cm (80–95 in) long; 200–300 kg (441–661 lb); Female: 216–241 cm (85–95 in) long; 200–300 kg (441–661 lb) Habitats: Neritic marine, oceanic marine, intertidal marine, and coastal marine Diet: Antarctic krill, as well as fish and squid
Mirounga (elephant seal)	Gray, 1827 Two species: M. angustirostris (Northern elephant seal); M. leonina (Southern elephant seal, pictured)	Antarctic Ocean and northeastern Pacific Ocean	Size range: 200 cm (79 in) long and 400 kg (882 lb) (southern elephant seal females) to 600 cm (236 in) long; 3,700 kg (8,157 lb) (southern elephant seal males) Habitats: Neritic marine, oceanic marine, intertidal marine, and coastal marine Diets: Squid, lanternfish, cod icefish, and other mesopelagic fish
Monachus	Fleming, 1822 One species: M. monachus (Mediterranean monk seal)	Scattered portions of the Mediterranean Sea	Size: 230–280 cm (91–110 in) long; 240–300 kg (529–661 lb) Habitats: Neritic marine, oceanic marine, intertidal marine, and coastal marine Diet: Benthic fish, pelagic fish, cephalopods, and lobsters
Neomonachus	Slater, Helgen, 2014 Two species: N. schauinslandi (Hawaiian monk seal, pictured); N. tropicalis (Caribbean monk seal†)	Hawaiian islands; formerly the Caribbean Sea	Size range: 200 cm (79 in) long and 200 kg (441 lb) (Caribbean monk seal) to 250 cm (98 in) long; 240 kg (529 lb) (Hawaiian monk seal) Habitats: Neritic marine, oceanic marine, intertidal marine, and coastal marine Diets: Benthic fish, pelagic fish, cephalopods, and lobsters
Ommatophoca	Gray, 1844 One species: O. rossii (Ross seal)	Coastal Antarctic Ocean	Size: Male: 168–208 cm (66–82 in) long; 129–216 kg (284–476 lb); Female: 190–250 cm (75–98 in) long; 159–204 kg (351–450 lb) Habitats: Neritic marine, oceanic marine, and coastal marine Diet: Squid, as well as fish and krill
Pagophilus	Gray, 1844 One species: P. groenlandicus (Harp seal)	Northern Atlantic Ocean	Size: Male: 171–190 cm (67–75 in) long; 135 kg (298 lb); Female: 168–183 cm (66–72 in) long; 120 kg (265 lb) Habitats: Neritic marine, oceanic marine, intertidal marine, and coastal marine Diet: A wide variety of fish and invertebrates
Phoca	Linnaeus, 1758 Two species: P. largha (Spotted seal); P. vitulina (Harbor seal, pictured)	Northern Hemisphere coastlines	Size range: 148 cm (58 in) long and 60 kg (132 lb) (harbor seal females) to 186 cm (73 in) long; 170 kg (375 lb) (harbor seal males) Habitats: Neritic marine, oceanic marine, intertidal marine, and coastal marine Diets: A wide variety of fish, cephalopods, and crustaceans
Pusa	Scopoli, 1771 Three species: P. caspica (Caspian seal); P. hispida (Ringed seal, pictured); P. sibirica (Baikal seal)	Arctic Ocean, Caspian Sea, and Lake Baikal	Size range: 110 cm (43 in) long and 32 kg (71 lb) (ringed seal) to 175 cm (69 in) long; 124 kg (273 lb) (ringed seal) Habitats: Inland wetlands, neritic marine, and oceanic marine Diets: A wide variety of fish and invertebrates

==== Procyonidae ====
Members of the Procyonidae family are procyonids and include raccoons, coatis, olingos, kinkajous, ring-tailed cats, and cacomistles, among others. Procyonidae comprises fourteen extant species, divided into six genera.

Not assigned to a named subfamily – six genera
Name	Authority and species	Range	Size and ecology
Bassaricyon (olingo)	Allen, 1876 Four species: B. alleni (Eastern lowland olingo); B. gabbii (Northern olingo, pictured); B. medius (Western lowland olingo); B. neblina (Olinguito)	Central America and northern South America	Size range: 30 cm (12 in) long, plus 40 cm (16 in) tail (eastern lowland olingo) to 45 cm (18 in) long, plus 53 cm (21 in) tail (northern olingo) Habitat: Forest Diets: Fruit and nectar, as well as flowers, small rodents, lizards, birds, insects, and eggs
Bassariscus	Coues, 1887 Two species: B. astutus (Ring-tailed cat, pictured); B. sumichrasti (Cacomistle)	Central America and southern North America	Size range: 30 cm (12 in) long, plus 31 cm (12 in) tail (ring-tailed cat) to 47 cm (19 in) long, plus 53 cm (21 in) tail (cacomistle) Habitats: Shrubland, forest, rocky areas, desert, and grassland Diets: Fruit, insects, and small vertebrates
Nasua (coati)	Storr, 1780 Two species: N. narica (White-nosed coati); N. nasua (South American coati, pictured)	Southern North America, Central America, and South America	Size range: 33 cm (13 in) long, plus 33 cm (13 in) tail (white-nosed coati) to 67 cm (26 in) long, plus 69 cm (27 in) tail (South American coati) Habitats: Forest, grassland, and shrubland Diets: Fruit and invertebrates
Nasuella (mountain coati)	Hollister, 1915 Two species: N. meridensis (Eastern mountain coati); N. olivacea (Western mountain coati, pictured)	Andes mountains in northern South America	Size range: 36 cm (14 in) long, plus 20 cm (8 in) tail (western mountain coati) to 54 cm (21 in) long, plus 30 cm (12 in) tail (eastern mountain coati) Habitats: Forest and grassland Diets: Invertebrates, small vertebrates, fruit, and vegetable remains
Potos	Geoffroy Saint-Hilaire & G. Cuvier, 1795 One species: P. flavus (Kinkajou)	Central America and northern South America	Size: 40–60 cm (16–24 in) long, plus 40–60 cm (16–24 in) tail Habitats: Forest Diet: Fruit, as well as flowers and leaves
Procyon (raccoon)	Storr, 1780 Three species: P. cancrivorus (Crab-eating raccoon); P. lotor (Raccoon, pictured); P. pygmaeus (Cozumel raccoon)	North and South America, and introduced to Central Europe, the Caucasus Mountains, and Japan	Size range: 41 cm (16 in) long, plus 19 cm (7 in) tail (raccoon) to 65 cm (26 in) long, plus 38 cm (15 in) tail (crab-eating raccoon) Habitats: Forest and inland wetlands Diets: Omnivorous, eats fruit, nuts, insects, small mammals, molluscs, crabs, eggs, birds, frogs, fish, aquatic invertebrates, worms, and garbage

==== Ursidae ====
Members of the Ursidae family are ursids, or colloquially bears. Ursidae comprises three extant subfamilies: the monotypic Ailuropodinae, the panda bears; Tremarctinae, the short-faced bears; and Ursinae, containing all other extant bears. There are eight extant species in Ursidae, divided into five genera.

Subfamily Ailuropodinae – Grevé, 1894 – one genus
Name	Authority and species	Range	Size and ecology
Ailuropoda	H. Milne-Edwards, 1870 One species: A. melanoleuca (Giant panda)	Central China	Size: 150–180 cm (59–71 in) long, plus 10–15 cm (4–6 in) tail 80–123 kg (176–271 lb) Habitat: Forest Diet: Bamboo

Subfamily Tremarctinae – Merriam, Stock, 1925 – one genus
Name	Authority and species	Range	Size and ecology
Tremarctos	Gervais, 1855 One species: T. ornatus (Spectacled bear)	Andes mountains in South America	Size: 120–200 cm (47–79 in) long, plus 7 cm (3 in) tail 60–175 kg (132–386 lb) Habitats: Shrubland, grassland, and forest Diet: Bromeliads and palm trees, as well as cattle, other mammals, and fruit

Subfamily Ursinae – Fischer de Waldheim, 1817 – three genera
Name	Authority and species	Range	Size and ecology
Helarctos	Gervais, 1855 One species: H. malayanus (Sun bear)	Southeastern Asia (current range in brown, former in black)	Size: 120–150 cm (47–59 in) long, plus 3–7 cm (1–3 in) tail 35–80 kg (77–176 lb) Habitats: Forest and shrubland Diet: Termites, ants, beetle larvae, bee larvae, honey, and fruit
Melursus	Meyer, 1793 One species: M. ursinus (Sloth bear)	India (current range in green, former in black)	Size: 150–180 cm (59–71 in) long, plus 7–12 cm (3–5 in) tail 54–141 kg (119–311 lb) Habitats: Shrubland, grassland, forest, and savanna Diet: Termites and fruit
Ursus	Linnaeus, 1758 Four species: U. americanus (American black bear); U. arctos (Brown bear, pictured); U. maritimus (Polar bear); U. thibetanus (Asian black bear)	North America, Europe, Asia	Size range: 100 cm (39 in) long, plus 6 cm (2 in) tail, 80 kg (176 lb) (brown bear) to 244 cm (96 in) long, plus 13 cm (5 in) tail, 726 kg (1,601 lb) (polar bear) Habitats: Forest, inland wetlands, grassland, shrubland, desert, oceanic marine, coastal marine, and intertidal marine Diets: Vegetation, insects, fruit, nuts, mammals; polar bear primarily eats seals, as well as walruses, beluga whales, birds, fish, vegetation and kelp

=== Suborder Feliformia ===
==== Eupleridae ====
Members of the Eupleridae family are euplerids, or colloquially Malagasy mongooses or Malagasy carnivorans. Eupleridae comprises two extant subfamilies, the civet-like Euplerinae and the mongoose-like Galidiinae. Historically, the Euplerinae species were included in the civet family Viverridae, and several of the Galidiinae species in the mongoose family Herpestidae, but more recent genetic evidence showed them to be part of the same clade, having evolved from a single ancestor species 18–24 million years ago. There are 10 extant species in Eupleridae, divided into 7 genera.

Subfamily Euplerinae – Chenu, 1850 – three genera
Name	Authority and species	Range	Size and ecology
Cryptoprocta	Bennett, 1833 One species: C. ferox (Fossa)	Madagascar	Size: 61–80 cm (24–31 in) long, plus 61–80 cm (24–31 in) tail Habitat: Forest Diet: Small mammals and reptiles
Eupleres	Doyère, 1835 Two species: E. goudotii (Eastern falanouc, pictured); E. major (Western falanouc)	Eastern and northern Madagascar	Size range: 45–65 cm (18–26 in) long, plus 22–25 cm (9–10 in) tail (eastern falanouc, western falanouc) Habitats: Forest and inland wetlands Diets: Invertebrates
Fossa	Gray, 1865 One species: F. fossana (Malagasy civet )	Eastern Madagascar	Size: 40–45 cm (16–18 in) long, plus 21–25 cm (8–10 in) tail Habitat: Forest Diet: Small vertebrates, insects, and bird's eggs

Subfamily Galidiinae – Gray, 1865 – four genera
Name	Authority and species	Range	Size and ecology
Galidia	Geoffroy, 1837 One species: G. elegans (Ring-tailed vontsira)	Eastern Madagascar	Size: 32–38 cm (13–15 in) long, plus 27–32 cm (11–13 in) tail Habitat: Forest Diet: Small mammals, birds, bird's eggs, and frogs, as well as fruit, fish, reptiles, and invertebrates
Galidictis	Geoffroy, 1839 Two species: G. fasciata (Broad-striped Malagasy mongoose); G. grandidieri (Grandidier's mongoose, pictured)	Eastern and southern Madagascar	Size range: 32–34 cm (13–13 in) long, plus 28–30 cm (11–12 in) tail (broad-striped Malagasy mongoose, Grandidier's mongoose) Habitats: Forest and shrubland Diets: Rodents and other small vertebrates, as well as invertebrates
Mungotictis	Pocock, 1915 One species: M. decemlineata (Narrow-striped mongoose)	Western Madagascar	Size: 25–35 cm (10–14 in) long, plus 23–27 cm (9–11 in) tail Habitats: Forest and shrubland Diet: Invertebrates, as well as reptiles
Salanoia	Gray, 1865 Two species: S. concolor (Brown-tailed mongoose, pictured); S. durrelli (Durrell's vontsira)	Northeastern Madagascar	Size range: 25 cm (10 in) long, plus 20 cm (8 in) tail (brown-tailed mongoose) to 33 cm (13 in) long, plus 21 cm (8 in) tail (Durrell's vontsira) Habitats: Forest and inland wetlands Diets: Insects and fruit as well as frogs, reptiles, and rodents; Durrell's vontsira may eat fish and molluscs

==== Felidae ====
Members of the Felidae family are felids, or colloquially cats; "cat" refers both to felids in general and specifically to domestic cats. Felidae comprises two extant subfamilies, Felinae (small cats) and Pantherinae (large cats). There are 34 extant species in Felinae, and 7 in Pantherinae.

Subfamily Felinae – Waldheim, 1817 – twelve genera
Name	Authority and species	Range	Size and ecology
Acinonyx	Brookes, 1828 One species: A. jubatus (Cheetah)	Southern Africa, central Africa, and Iran	Size: 113–140 cm (44–55 in) long, 60–84 cm (24–33 in) tail Habitats: Desert, grassland, savanna, and shrubland Diet: Antelopes and gazelles
Caracal	Gray, 1843 Two species: C. aurata (African golden cat); C. caracal (Caracal, pictured)	Africa and western Asia	Size range: 65 cm (26 in) long, plus 28 cm (11 in) tail (African golden cat) to 100 cm (39 in) long, plus 34 cm (13 in) tail (caracal) Habitats: Forest, desert, grassland, shrubland, and savanna Diets: Rodents and squirrels, along with antelope, primates, birds, reptiles, and fish
Catopuma	Severtzov, 1858 Two species: C. badia (Bay cat); C. temminckii (Asian golden cat, pictured)	Southeastern Asia	Size range: 53 cm (21 in) long, plus 32 cm (13 in) tail (bay cat) to 105 cm (41 in) long, plus 56 cm (22 in) tail (Asian golden cat) Habitats: Forest, savanna, grassland, and shrubland Diets: Mostly unknown, with evidence of preying on rodents, squirrels, and snakes
Felis	Linnaeus, 1758 Seven species: F. bieti (Chinese mountain cat); F. catus (Domestic cat, pictured); F. chaus (Jungle cat); F. lybica (African wildcat); F. margarita (Sand cat); F. nigripes (Black-footed cat); F. silvestris (European wildcat)	Africa, Europe, and Asia (domestic cat worldwide)	Size range: 37 cm (15 in) long, plus 14 cm (6 in) tail (black-footed cat) to 85 cm (33 in) long, plus 35 cm (14 in) tail (Chinese mountain cat) Habitats: Forest, desert, shrubland, savanna, grassland, and inland wetlands, plus cosmopolitan distribution of feral domestic cats Diets: Birds and small mammals, as well as other small animals
Herpailurus	Saint-Hilaire, 1803 One species: H. yagouaroundi (Jaguarundi)	South and Central America	Size: 49–78 cm (19–31 in) long, 28–59 cm (11–23 in) tail Habitats: Grassland, shrubland, savanna, and forest Diet: Small mammals, birds and reptiles
Leopardus	Gray, 1842 Eight species: L. colocola (Pampas cat); L. geoffroyi (Geoffroy's cat); L. guigna (Kodkod); L. guttulus (Southern tiger cat); L. jacobita (Andean mountain cat); L. pardalis (Ocelot, pictured); L. tigrinus (Oncilla); L. wiedii (Margay)	South and Central America; Trinidad and Margarita in the Caribbean	Size range: 37 cm (15 in) long, plus20 cm (8 in) tail (kodkod) to 102 cm (40 in) long, plus 50 cm (20 in) tail (ocelot) Habitats: Savanna, forest, shrubland, grassland, rocky areas, and desert Diets: Small and medium mammals, birds and reptiles, as well as carrion
Leptailurus	Severtzov, 1858 One species: L. serval (Serval)	Non-rainforest sub-Saharan Africa	Size: 59–100 cm (23–39 in) long, 20–38 cm (8–15 in) tail Habitats: Grassland, inland wetlands, forest, and savanna Diet: Small mammals and rodents, as well as birds, reptiles, and arthropods
Lynx	Kerr, 1792 Four species: L. canadensis (Canada lynx); L. lynx (Eurasian lynx, pictured); L. pardinus (Iberian lynx); L. rufus (Bobcat)	North America, northern Europe, and northern and central Asia	Size range: 80 cm (31 in) long, plus9 cm (4 in) tail (bobcat) to 120 cm (47 in) long, plus 23 cm (9 in) tail (Eurasian lynx) Habitats: Desert, shrubland, savanna, forest, rocky areas, and grassland Diets: Rabbits and hares, along with rodents, birds, deer, and small or medium-sized mammals
Otocolobus	Brandt, 1841 One species: O. manul (Pallas's cat)	Central Asia	Size: 46–65 cm (18–26 in) long, 21–31 cm (8–12 in) tail Habitats: Rocky areas, grassland, shrubland, and desert Diet: Small mammals, especially pikas, as well as rodents and birds
Pardofelis	Severtzov, 1858 One species: P. marmorata (Marbled cat)	Southeastern Asia	Size: 45–62 cm (18–24 in) long, 36–55 cm (14–22 in) tail Habitat: Forest Diet: Likely eats rodents, squirrels, and birds
Prionailurus	Severtzov, 1858 Five species: P. bengalensis (Leopard cat, pictured); P. javanensis (Sunda leopard cat); P. rubiginosus (Rusty-spotted cat); P. planiceps (Flat-headed cat); P. viverrinus (Fishing cat)	Southeastern Asia	Size range: 35 cm (14 in) long, plus 20 cm (8 in) tail (rusty-spotted cat) to 85 cm (33 in) long, plus 30 cm (12 in) tail (fishing cat) Habitats: Inland wetlands, shrubland, grassland, forest, desert, and savanna Diets: Rodents, birds, and fish, as well as amphibians and lizards
Puma	Jardine, 1834 One species: P. concolor (Cougar)	South America and North America	Size: 100–150 cm (39–59 in) long, 60–90 cm (24–35 in) tail Habitats: Forest, desert, grassland, savanna, and shrubland Diet: Deer, as well as smaller mammals such as feral pigs, raccoons and armadillos

Subfamily Pantherinae – Pocock, 1917 – two genera
Name	Authority and species	Range	Size and ecology
Neofelis	Gray, 1867 Two species: N. diardi (Sunda clouded leopard); N. nebulosa (Clouded leopard, pictured)	Southeastern Asia	Size range: 69–108 cm (27–43 in) long, plus 61–91 cm (24–36 in) tail Habitats: Forest and shrubland Diets: Medium-sized and small mammals on the ground and in trees, as well as birds
Panthera	Oken, 1816 Five species: P. leo (Lion); P. onca (Jaguar); P. pardus (Leopard, pictured); P. tigris (Tiger); P. uncia (Snow leopard)	Africa, Asia and the Americas	Size range: 90 cm (35 in) long, plus 80 cm (31 in) tail (snow leopard) to 250 cm (98 in) long, plus 100 cm (39 in) tail (lion) Habitats: Forest, shrubland, inland wetlands, savanna, grassland, rocky areas, and desert Diets: Ungulates and other small to large mammals, as well as birds, insects, and reptiles

==== Herpestidae ====
Members of the Herpestidae family are herpestids, or colloquially mongooses. Herpestidae comprises two extant subfamilies, Herpestinae, comprising the species that are native to southern Europe, Africa and Asia, and Mungotinae, comprising the species native to Africa. There are 34 extant species in Herpestidae, divided into 15 genera.

Subfamily Herpestinae – Gray, 1864 – eight genera
Name	Authority and species	Range	Size and ecology
Atilax	F. Cuvier, 1826 One species: A. paludinosus (Marsh mongoose)	Sub-Saharan Africa	Size: 46–64 cm (18–25 in) long, plus 31–41 cm (12–16 in) tail Habitats: Forest, grassland, inland wetlands, neritic marine, and coastal marine Diet: Crustaceans as well as other aquatic prey and rodents
Bdeogale	Peters, 1850 Three species: B. crassicauda (Bushy-tailed mongoose, pictured); B. jacksoni (Jackson's mongoose); B. nigripes (Black-footed mongoose)	Central Africa	Size range: 36 cm (14 in) long, plus 22 cm (9 in) tail (bushy-tailed mongoose) to 65 cm (26 in) long, plus 40 cm (16 in) tail (black-footed mongoose) Habitats: Forest, savanna, and shrubland Diets: Omnivorous, especially mammals and insects
Cynictis	Ogilby, 1833 One species: C. penicillata (Yellow mongoose)	Southern Africa	Size: 26–46 cm (10–18 in) long, plus 16–30 cm (6–12 in) tail Habitats: Savanna, shrubland, and grassland Diet: Insects, as well as rodents, birds, other vertebrates, and arachnids
Herpestes	Illiger, 1811 Five species: G. flavescens (Angolan slender mongoose); G. ichneumon (Egyptian mongoose); G. ochracea (Somalian slender mongoose); G. pulverulenta (Cape gray mongoose); G. sanguinea (Common slender mongoose, pictured)	Africa, Middle East, and southern Europe	Size range: 25 cm (10 in) long, plus 22 cm (9 in) tail (Somalian slender mongoose) to 43 cm (17 in) long, plus 34 cm (13 in) tail (Cape gray mongoose) Habitats: Shrubland, forest, rocky areas, inland wetlands, savanna, and desert Diets: Small mammals and insects, as well as birds, lizards, and snakes
Ichneumia	Geoffroy, 1837 One species: I. albicauda (White-tailed mongoose)	Sub-Saharan Africa, southern Arabic peninsula	Size: 51–104 cm (20–41 in) long, plus 34–47 cm (13–19 in) tail Habitats: Forest, savanna, shrubland, grassland, and inland wetlands Diet: Insects
Paracynictis	Pocock, 1916 One species: P. selousi (Selous's mongoose)	Southern Africa	Size: 63–90 cm (25–35 in) long, plus 28–43 cm (11–17 in) tail Habitats: Savanna and grassland Diet: Invertebrates, as well as small rodents, amphibians, reptiles, and birds
Rhynchogale	Thomas, 1894 One species: R. melleri (Meller's mongoose)	Southeastern Africa	Size: 36–57 cm (14–22 in) long, plus 30–42 cm (12–17 in) tail Habitats: Forest, savanna, and shrubland Diet: Termites, as well as other invertebrates
Urva	Hodgson, 1836 Nine species: U. auropunctata (Small Indian mongoose); U. brachyura (Short-tailed mongoose); U. edwardsii (Indian grey mongoose, pictured); U. fusca (Indian brown mongoose); U. javanica (Javan mongoose); U. semitorquatus (Collared mongoose); U. smithii (Ruddy mongoose); U. urva (Crab-eating mongoose); U. vitticolla (Stripe-necked mongoose)	Asia	Size range: 25 cm (10 in) long, plus 24 cm (9 in) tail (Javan mongoose) to 50 cm (20 in) long, plus 30 cm (12 in) tail (crab-eating mongoose) Habitats: Forest, savanna, shrubland, grassland, and inland wetlands Diets: Generally omnivorous; some primarily eat rodents, birds, and reptiles
Xenogale	Allen, 1919 One species: X. naso (Long-nosed mongoose)	Central Africa	Size: 40–61 cm (16–24 in) long, plus 32–43 cm (13–17 in) tail Habitats: Forest and inland wetlands Diet: Omnivorous

Subfamily Mungotinae – Gray, 1864 – six genera
Name	Authority and species	Range	Size and ecology
Crossarchus (kusimanse)	F. Cuvier, 1825 Four species: C. alexandri (Alexander's kusimanse); C. ansorgei (Angolan kusimanse); C. obscurus (Common kusimanse, pictured); C. platycephalus (Flat-headed kusimanse)	Central Africa	Size range: 21 cm (8 in) long, plus 15 cm (6 in) tail (flat-headed kusimanse) to 44 cm (17 in) long, plus 32 cm (13 in) tail (Alexander's kusimanse) Habitats: Forest, savanna, and inland wetlands Diets: Insects, small vertebrates, eggs, and fruit
Dologale	Thomas, 1926 One species: D. dybowskii (Pousargues's mongoose)	Central Africa	Size: 24–30 cm (9–12 in) long, plus 16–22 cm (6–9 in) tail Habitats: Forest, savanna, and grassland Diet: Invertebrates
Helogale (dwarf mongoose)	Gray, 1862 Two species: H. hirtula (Ethiopian dwarf mongoose); H. parvula (Common dwarf mongoose, pictured)	Central and eastern Africa	Size range: 18 cm (7 in) long, plus 14 cm (6 in) tail (common dwarf mongoose) to 26 cm (10 in) long, plus 20 cm (8 in) tail (Ethiopian dwarf mongoose) Habitats: Savanna, shrubland, and grassland Diets: Invertebrates, as well as small vertebrates
Liberiictis	Hayman, 1958 One species: L. kuhni (Liberian mongoose)	Western Africa	Size: 42–55 cm (17–22 in) long, plus 18–21 cm (7–8 in) tail Habitat: Forest Diet: Earthworms, as well as small vertebrates, insect larvae, and fruit
Mungos	Geoffroy, 1795 Two species: M. gambianus (Gambian mongoose); M. mungo (Banded mongoose, pictured)	Sub-Saharan Africa	Size range: 30 cm (12 in) long, plus 19 cm (7 in) tail (banded mongoose) to 36 cm (14 in) long, plus 22 cm (9 in) tail (Gambian mongoose) Habitats: Forest, savanna, shrubland, and grassland Diets: Insects, as well as other invertebrates, reptiles, amphibians, bird eggs, young birds, small mammals, and fruit
Suricata	Desmarest, 1804 One species: S. suricatta (Meerkat)	Southern Africa	Size: 23–36 cm (9–14 in) long, plus 18–24 cm (7–9 in) tail Habitats: Savanna, shrubland, grassland, and desert Diet: Invertebrates

==== Hyaenidae ====
Members of the Hyaenidae family are hyaenids, or colloquially hyenas. Hyaenidae comprises four extant species, divided into four genera.

Not assigned to a named subfamily – four genera
Name	Authority and species	Range	Size and ecology
Crocuta	Kaup, 1828 One species: C. crocuta (Spotted hyena)	Sub-Saharan Africa	Size: 95–150 cm (37–59 in) long, plus 30–36 cm (12–14 in) tail Habitats: Forest, savanna, and grassland Diet: Medium to large mammals, as well as carrion
Hyaena	Brisson, 1762 One species: H. hyaena (Striped hyena)	Northern and eastern Africa, the Caucasus in Europe, and southern and western Asia	Size: 100 cm (39 in) long, plus 30 cm (12 in) tail Habitats: Forest, savanna, shrubland, grassland, inland wetlands, rocky areas, desert, intertidal marine, coastal marine Diet: Carrion, as well as live vertebrates, insects, and fruit
Parahyaena	Thunberg, 1820 One species: P. brunnea (Brown hyena)	Southwestern Africa	Size: 125 cm (49 in) long, plus 30 cm (12 in) tail Habitats: Desert and savanna Diet: Carrion
Proteles	Geoffroy, 1824 One species: P. cristata (Aardwolf)	Southern and eastern Africa	Size: 55–85 cm (22–33 in) long, plus 20–30 cm (8–12 in) tail Habitats: Savanna, shrubland, and grassland Diet: Harvester termites

==== Nandiniidae ====
The Nandiniidae family is composed of a single extant species, the African palm civet.

Not assigned to a named subfamily – one genus
Name	Authority and species	Range	Size and ecology
Nandinia	Gray, 1843 One species: N. binotata (African palm civet)	Central Africa	Size: 37–63 cm (15–25 in) long, plus 34–77 cm (13–30 in) tail Habitats: Forest, savanna, and shrubland Diet: Fruit, as well as vertebrates and insects

==== Prionodontidae ====
The Prionodontidae family is composed of a single extant species in a single genus.

Not assigned to a named subfamily – one genus
Name	Authority and species	Range	Size and ecology
Prionodon (Asiatic linsang)	Horsfield, 1822 Two species: P. linsang (Banded linsang, pictured); P. pardicolor (Spotted linsang)	Southeastern Asia	Size range: 31–45 cm (12–18 in) long, plus 30–42 cm (12–17 in) tail (banded linsang and spotted linsang) Habitats: Forest, shrubland, and grassland Diets: Small vertebrates

==== Viverridae ====
Members of the Viverridae family are viverrids, and the family is composed mainly of the civets and genets. Viverridae comprises four extant subfamilies, the 3 civet subfamilies Viverrinae, Hemigalinae, and Paradoxurinae, and the genet subfamily Genettinae. There are 33 extant species in Viverridae, divided into 14 genera.

Subfamily Genettinae – Gray, 1864 – two genera
Name	Authority and species	Range	Size and ecology
Genetta (genet)	Cuvier, 1816 Fourteen species: G. abyssinica (Abyssinian genet); G. angolensis (Angolan genet); G. bourloni (Bourlon's genet); G. cristata (Crested servaline genet); G. genetta (Common genet, pictured); G. johnstoni (Johnston's genet); G. maculata (Rusty-spotted genet); G. pardina (Pardine genet); G. piscivora (Aquatic genet); G. poensis (King genet); G. servalina (Servaline genet); G. thierryi (Hausa genet); G. tigrina (Cape genet); G. victoriae (Giant forest genet)	Africa, southwestern Europe, and southern Arabian Peninsula	Size range: 40 cm (16 in) long, plus 38 cm (15 in) tail (Abyssinian genet) to 68 cm (27 in) long, plus 47 cm (19 in) tail (king genet) Habitats: Forest, savanna, shrubland, grassland, inland wetlands, and rocky areas Diets: Small mammals, birds, insects, fruit, and seeds, as well as reptiles and amphibians
Poiana (African linsang)	Gray, 1865 Two species: P. leightoni (West African oyan); P. richardsonii (Central African oyan, pictured)	Central and western Africa	Size range: 30 cm (12 in) long, plus 35 cm (14 in) tail (West African oyan) to 38 cm (15 in) long, plus 40 cm (16 in) tail (Central African oyan) Habitat: Forest Diets: Believed to eat small vertebrates and invertebrates

Subfamily Hemigalinae – Thomas, 1912 – four genera
Name	Authority and species	Range	Size and ecology
Chrotogale	Thomas, 1912 One species: C. owstoni (Owston's palm civet)	Southeastern Asia	Size: 51–63 cm (20–25 in) long, plus 38–48 cm (15–19 in) tail Habitats: Forest and shrubland Diet: Believed to primarily eat earthworms and other invertebrates
Cynogale	Gray, 1837 One species: C. bennettii (Otter civet)	Southeastern Asia	Size: 57–68 cm (22–27 in) long, plus 12–21 cm (5–8 in) tail Habitats: Forest and inland wetlands Diet: Fish, crabs, molluscs, small mammals, and birds
Diplogale	Thomas, 1912 One species: D. hosei (Hose's palm civet)	Borneo in Southeast Asia	Size: 47–54 cm (19–21 in) long, plus 29–34 cm (11–13 in) tail Habitat: Forest Diet: Believed to primarily eat small fish, shrimp, crabs, and frogs as well as insects
Hemigalus	Jourdan, 1837 One species: H. derbyanus (Banded palm civet)	Southeastern Asia	Size: 45–56 cm (18–22 in) long, plus 25–36 cm (10–14 in) tail Habitat: Forest Diet: Insects

Subfamily Paradoxurinae – Gray, 1864 – five genera
Name	Authority and species	Range	Size and ecology
Arctictis	Temminck, 1824 One species: A. binturong (Binturong)	Southeastern Asia	Size: 61–96 cm (24–38 in) long, plus 56–89 cm (22–35 in) tail Habitat: Forest Diet: Fruit
Arctogalidia	Merriam, 1897 One species: A. trivirgata (Small-toothed palm civet)	Southeastern Asia	Size: 44–60 cm (17–24 in) long, plus 48–66 cm (19–26 in) tail Habitat: Forest Diet: Omnivorous; primarily eats fruit
Macrogalidia	Schwarz, 1910 One species: M. musschenbroekii (Sulawesi palm civet)	Sulawesi island in Southeast Asia	Size: 65–72 cm (26–28 in) long, plus 44–54 cm (17–21 in) tail Habitats: Forest, shrubland, and grassland Diet: Rodents and palm fruit, as well as other small mammals, birds, fruit, and grass
Paguma	Gray, 1831 One species: P. larvata (Masked palm civet)	Eastern and southeastern Asia	Size: 50–76 cm (20–30 in) long, plus 50–64 cm (20–25 in) tail Habitats: Forest and shrubland Diet: Omnivorous; primarily eats fruit
Paradoxurus	F. Cuvier, 1821 Three species: P. hermaphroditus (Asian palm civet, pictured); P. jerdoni (Brown palm civet); P. zeylonensis (Golden palm civet)	Southern and southeastern Asia	Size range: 43 cm (17 in) long, plus 38 cm (15 in) tail (brown palm civet) to 58 cm (23 in) long, plus 53 cm (21 in) tail (golden palm civet) Habitats: Forest, shrubland, and grassland Diets: Omnivorous; primarily eats fruit and rodents

Subfamily Viverrinae – Gray, 1864 – three genera
Name	Authority and species	Range	Size and ecology
Civettictis	Pocock, 1915 One species: C. civetta (African civet)	Central and southern Africa	Size: 60–92 cm (24–36 in) long, plus 43–61 cm (17–24 in) tail Habitats: Forest, savanna, shrubland, and inland wetlands Diet: Omnivorous; primarily eats fruit
Viverra	Linnaeus, 1758 Four species: V. civettina (Malabar large-spotted civet); V. megaspila (Large-spotted civet); V. tangalunga (Malayan civet); V. zibetha (Large Indian civet, pictured)	Southeastern Asia and southwestern India	Size range: 58 cm (23 in) long, plus 30 cm (12 in) tail (Malayan civet) to 95 cm (37 in) long, plus 59 cm (23 in) tail (large Indian civet) Habitats: Forest, shrubland, and inland wetlands Diets: Omnivorous
Viverricula	Hodgson, 1838 One species: V. indica (Small Indian civet)	Southern and southeastern Asia	Size: 45–63 cm (18–25 in) long, plus 30–43 cm (12–17 in) tail Habitats: Forest, savanna, shrubland, grassland, and inland wetlands Diet: Rodents, birds, snakes, fruit, roots, carrion, and insects

== See also ==
- Mammal classification

== Sources ==
- Brown, Gary (February 1996). Great Bear Almanac. The Lyons Press. ISBN 978-1-55821-474-3.
- Burnie, David; Wilson, Don E., eds. (August 29, 2011). Animal: The Definitive Visual Guide to the World's Wildlife (2nd ed.). DK Adult. ISBN 978-0-7894-7764-4.
- Burnie, David; Wilson, Don E., eds. (2017). Animal. DK. ISBN 978-1-4654-7086-7.
- Camacho, G.; Page-Nicholson, S.; Child, M. F.; Do Linh San, E. (2016). The Red List of Mammals of South Africa, Swaziland and Lesotho. South African National Biodiversity Institute and Endangered Wildlife Trust.
- Eisenberg, J. F.; Redford, K. H. (May 15, 2000). Mammals of the Neotropics: The Central Neotropics: Ecuador, Peru, Bolivia, Brazil. University of Chicago Press. ISBN 978-0-226-19542-1. OCLC 493329394.
- Francis, Charles (2019). Field Guide to the Mammals of South-east Asia (2nd ed.). Bloomsbury Publishing. ISBN 978-1-4729-3499-4.
- Heptner, V. G.; Naumov, N. P. (1998). Mammals of the Soviet Union Vol. II Part 1a, Sirenia and Carnivora (Sea cows; Wolves and Bears). Science Publishers. ISBN 978-1-886106-81-9. Archived from the original on December 28, 2018.
- Heptner, V. G.; Sludskii, A. A. (2002). Mammals of the Soviet Union. Vol. II, part 1b, Carnivores (Mustelidae and Procyonidae). Smithsonian Institution. ISBN 978-90-04-08876-4.
- Hoath, Richard (2009). A Field Guide to the Mammals of Egypt. American University in Cairo Press. ISBN 978-977-416-254-1.
- Hunter, Luke (2019). Carnivores of the World (2nd ed.). Princeton University Press. ISBN 978-0-691-18295-7.
- Hunter, Luke; Barrett, Priscilla (2020). Field Guide to Carnivores of the World (2nd ed.). Bloomsbury Publishing. ISBN 978-1-4729-8267-4.
- Jefferson, Thomas A.; Webber, Marc A.; Pitman, Robert L. (2015). Marine Mammals of the World: A Comprehensive Guide to their Identification. Academic Press. ISBN 978-0-12-409592-2.
- Leite Pitman, Renata; S. R. Williams, Robert (2004). Sillero-Zubiri, C.; Gingsberg, J. R.; Macdonald, D. W. (eds.). Canids: Species status and conservation (2004 ed.). International Union for Conservation of Nature.
- Menon, Vivek (2014). Indian Mammals: A Field Guide. Hachette India. ISBN 978-93-5009-761-8.
- Minnie, Liaan; Avenant, N.; Drouilly, Marine; Samuels, Mogamat (November 2018). Livestock predation and its management in South Africa: a scientific assessment. Centre for African Conservation Ecology.
- Nowak, Ronald M.; Walker, Ernest Pillsbury (2003). Walker's Marine Mammals of the World. Johns Hopkins University Press. ISBN 978-0-8018-7343-0.
- Nowak, Ronald M.; Walker, Ernest P. (2005). Walker's Carnivores of the World. Johns Hopkins University Press. ISBN 978-0-8018-8033-9.
- Payne, Junaidi; Francis, Charles M.; Phillipps, Karen (1985). A Field Guide to the Mammals of Borneo. Sabah Society. ISBN 978-967-99947-1-1.
- Seton, E. T. (1929). Lives of Game Animals. Vol. 2. Doubleday, Doran. OCLC 872457192.
- Skinner, J. D.; Chimimba, Christian T. (2005). The Mammals of the Southern African Sub-region. Cambridge University Press. ISBN 978-1-107-39405-6.
- Smith, Andrew T.; Xie, Yan, eds. (2013). Mammals of China. Princeton University Press. ISBN 978-1-4008-4688-7.
- Smith, Andrew T.; Xie, Yan; Hoffmann, Robert S.; Lunde, Darrin; MacKinnon, John; Wilson, Don E.; Wozencraft, W. Chris, eds. (2010). A Guide to the Mammals of China. Princeton University Press. ISBN 978-1-4008-3411-2.
- Stuart, Chris; Stuart, Mathilde (2015). Stuarts' Field Guide to Mammals of Southern Africa. Penguin Random House South Africa. ISBN 978-1-77584-266-8.
- Stuart, Chris (2017). Stuarts' Field Guide to the Larger Mammals of Africa. Penguin Random House South Africa. ISBN 978-1-77584-274-3.
- Van Rompaey, H.; Colyn, M. (2014). Kingdon, J.; Hoffmann, M. (eds.). The Mammals of Africa. Vol. V: Carnivores, Pangolins, Equids and Rhinoceroses. Bloomsbury Publishing. ISBN 978-1-4081-8994-8.
- Walker, Ernest Pillsbury; Nowak, Ronald M. (1999). Walker's Mammals of the World. Vol. 1. Johns Hopkins University Press. ISBN 978-0-8018-5789-8.
- Würsig, Bernd (2009). Encyclopedia of Marine Mammals. Elsevier Science. ISBN 978-0-08-091993-5.
