= S. concolor =

S. concolor may refer to:

- Salanoia concolor, the brown-tailed mongoose, Malagasy brown-tailed mongoose or salano, a mammal species endemic to Madagascar
- Schippia concolor, the mountain pimento or Silver pimeto, a medium-sized palm species native to Belize and Guatemala
- Simias concolor, the pig-tailed langur, a large Old World monkey species found only on the Mentawai Islands in Indonesia

== See also ==
- Concolor
