= Civet cat =

Civet cat is an imprecise term that is used for a variety of cat-like creatures including:

- Viverrids, species of the family Viverridae
- Civets, common name for small, mostly arboreal mammals native to the tropics of Africa and Asia including most viverrids as well as the African palm civet and Malagasy civet, which are in separate families
- Ringtail or North American civet cat (Bassariscus astutus), related to the raccoons
- Spotted skunks, skunks of the genus Spilogale
