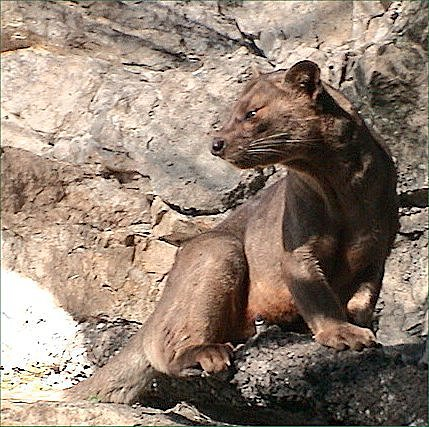
- Fossa (Cryptoprocta ferox)

Scientific classification
- Kingdom: Animalia
- Phylum: Chordata
- Class: Mammalia
- Order: Carnivora
- Family: Eupleridae
- Subfamily: Euplerinae; Chenu, 1850

Genera
- Cryptoprocta; Eupleres; Fossa
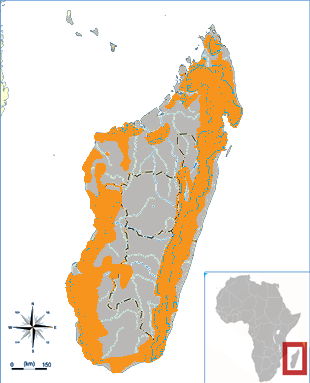
- Euplerinae range

= Euplerinae =

Euplerinae Temporal range: Holocene Suspected Early Miocene origin

Subfamily of carnivores

Euplerinae, more commonly known as Malagasy civets, is a subfamily of carnivorans that includes four species restricted to Madagascar. Together with the subfamily Galidiinae, which also only occurs on Madagascar, it forms the family Eupleridae. Members of this subfamily, which include the fossa (Cryptoprocta ferox), falanoucs (Eupleres goudotii and Eupleres major) and Malagasy civet (Fossa fossana), were placed in families like Felidae and Viverridae before genetic data indicated their consanguinity with other Madagascar carnivorans. Within the subfamily, the falanouc and Malagasy civet are more closely related to each other than to the fossa.

== Classification ==
Subfamily Euplerinae
Genus	Species	Image
Cryptoprocta (Bennett, 1833)	Fossa (C. ferox); †Giant fossa (C. spelea); (†C. bevatabe)	
Eupleres (Doyère, 1835)	Eastern falanouc (E. goudotii); Western falanouc (E. major)	
Fossa (Gray, 1864)	Malagasy civet (F. fossana)	

=== Phylogenetic tree ===
The phylogenetic relationships of Malagasy civets (Euplerinae) are shown in the following cladogram:

- Euplerinae
  - Eupleres
    - Eupleres major (Western falanouc)
    - Eupleres goudotii (Eastern falanouc)
  - - Cryptoprocta
      - Cryptoprocta ferox (Fossa)
      - †Cryptoprocta spelea (Giant fossa)
    - Fossa
      Fossa fossana (Malagasy civet)

== See also ==
- List of mammals of Madagascar
