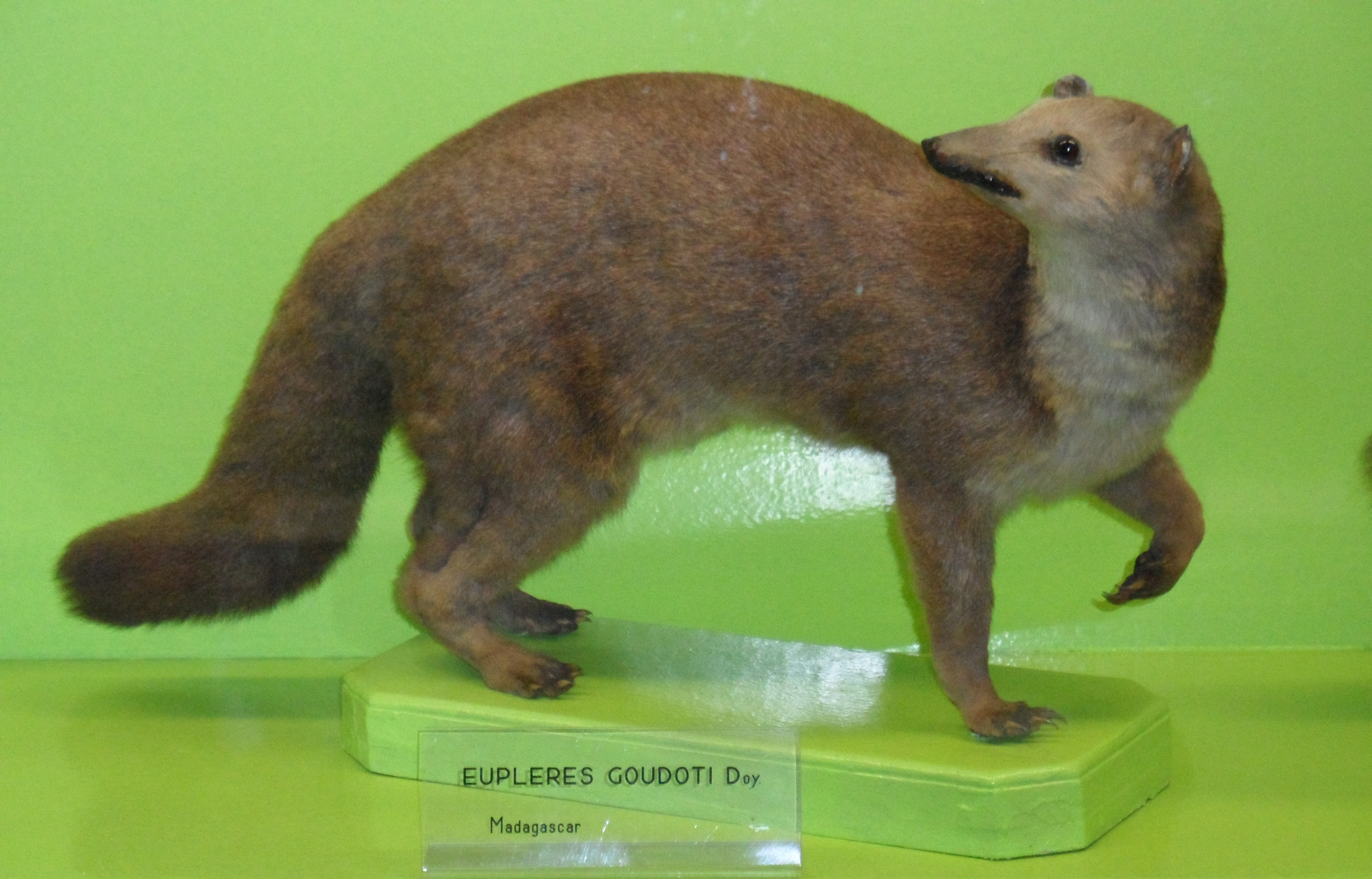
- Eastern falanouc (Eupleres goudotii)

Scientific classification
- Kingdom: Animalia
- Phylum: Chordata
- Class: Mammalia
- Order: Carnivora
- Family: Eupleridae
- Subfamily: Euplerinae
- Genus: Eupleres; Doyère, 1835

Type species
- Eupleres goudotii

Species
- Eupleres goudotii; Eupleres major
- Eupleres range

= Eupleres =

Genus of carnivores

Eupleres is a genus of two species of mongoose-like euplerid mammal native to Madagascar that are known as falanoucs. They are primarily terrestrial and consume mainly invertebrates.

== Species ==
- Eastern falanouc, Eupleres goudotii - mesic forests of eastern Madagascar
- Western falanouc, Eupleres major - xeric areas in northwestern Madagascar

== Conservation status ==
The IUCN Red List lists E. goudotii as vulnerable, while E. major has been assessed as endangered.
