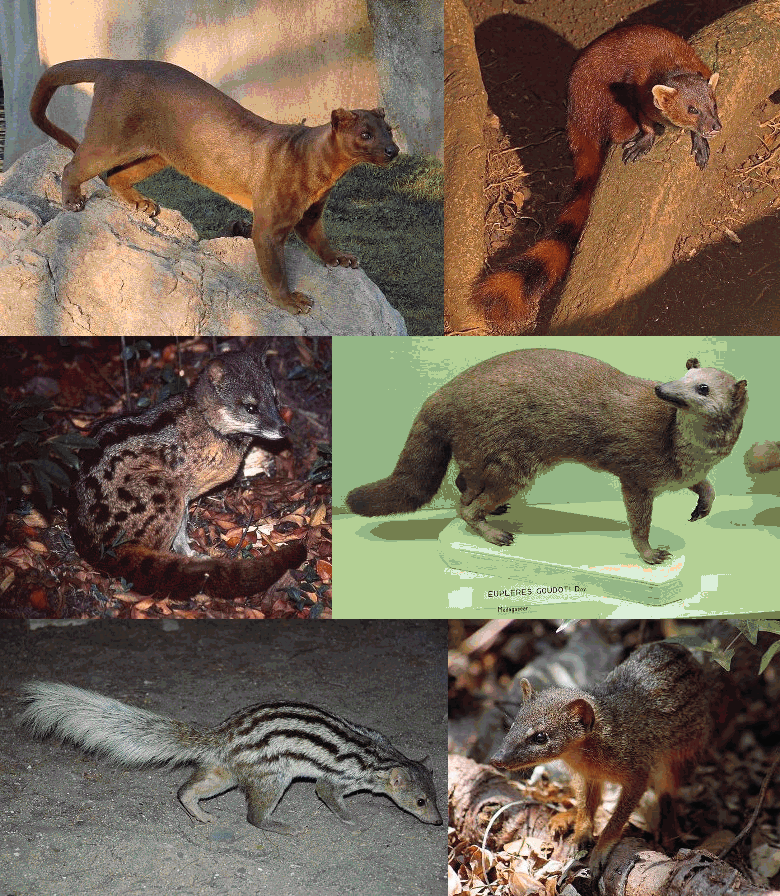

Scientific classification
- Kingdom: Animalia
- Phylum: Chordata
- Class: Mammalia
- Order: Carnivora
- Superfamily: Herpestoidea
- Family: Eupleridae; Chenu, 1850

Type genus
- Eupleres Doyère, 1835

Subfamilies
- Euplerinae; Galidiinae
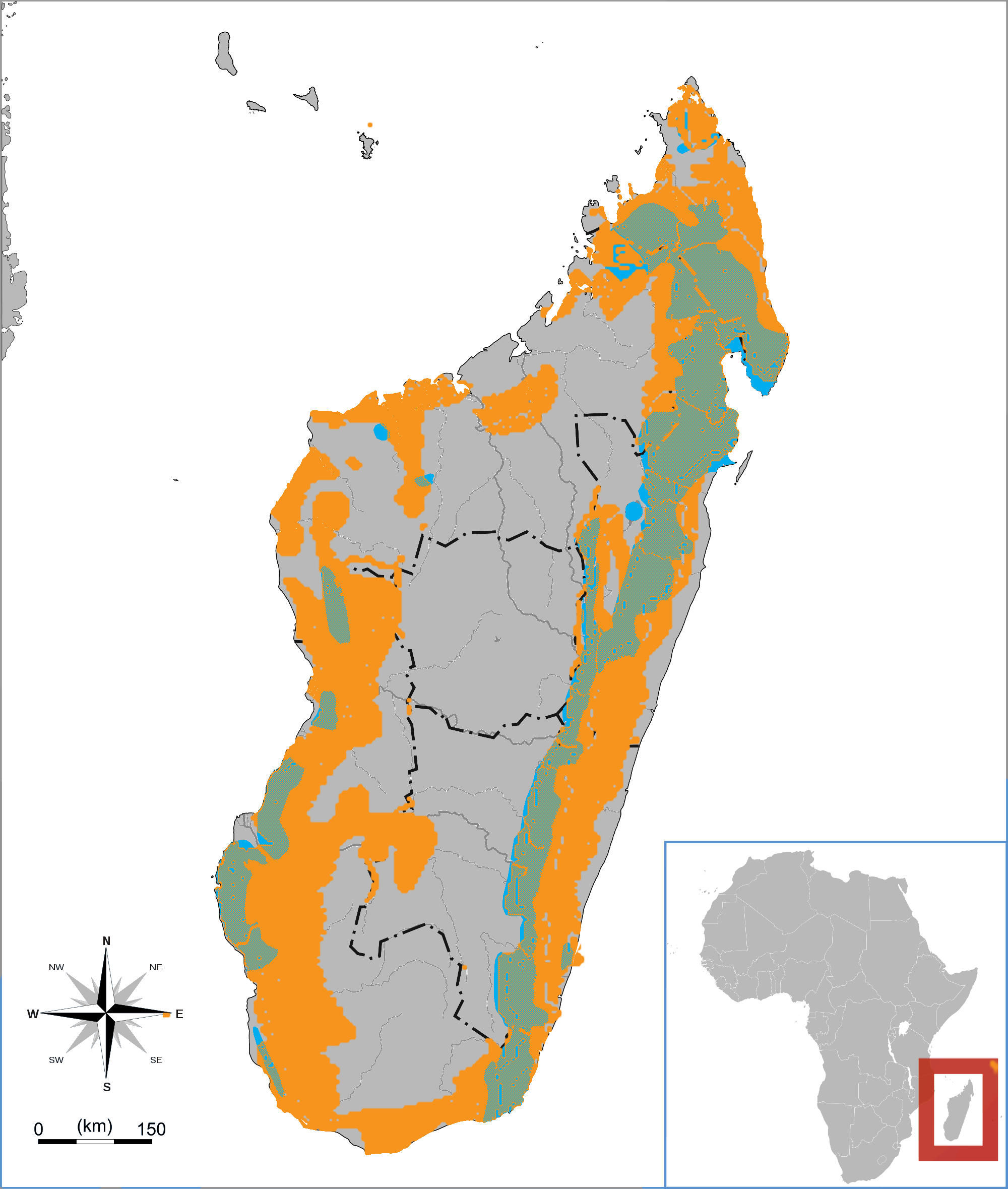
- Euplerinae subfamily ranges

Synonyms
- Euplerini Simpson, 1945; Cryptoproctina Gray, 1864; Galidiina Gray, 1864; Cryptoproctidae Flower, 1869; Galidiinae Gill, 1872; Galidictinae Mivart, 1882; Cryptoproctinae Trouessart, 1885; Fossinae Pocock, 1915

= Eupleridae =

Malagasy carnivorans Temporal range: Holocene Suspected Early Miocene origin

Family of carnivores

Eupleridae is a family of carnivorans endemic to Madagascar and comprising 10 known living species in seven genera, commonly known as euplerids or Malagasy carnivorans. The best known species is the fossa (Cryptoprocta ferox), in the subfamily Euplerinae. All species of Euplerinae were formerly classified as viverrids, while all species in the subfamily Galidiinae were classified as mongooses.

Recent molecular studies indicate that the 10 living species of Madagascar carnivorans evolved from one ancestor that is thought to have rafted over from mainland Africa 18–24 million years ago. This makes Malagasy carnivorans a clade. They are closely allied with the true herpestid mongooses, their closest living relatives. The fossa and the Malagasy civet (Fossa fossana) are each evolutionarily quite distinct from each other and from the rest of the clade.

All Eupleridae are considered threatened species due to habitat destruction, as well as predation and competition from non-native species.

== Taxonomy and phylogeny ==
Historically, the relationships of the Madagascar carnivorans have been contentious, but molecular evidence suggests that they form a single clade, now recognized as the family Eupleridae. The hyena family, Hyaenidae, is a sister taxon of the euplerid and herpestid clade, and when grouped together with the viverrids and felids, as well as some smaller groups, forms the feliform (cat-like carnivores) clade.

The evolutionary divergence between the herpestids and the euplerids dates back to the Oligocene. At that time, feliforms shared many similarities, particularly between the cats and the viverrids. Palaeoprionodon (within the clade Aeluroidea), found in Europe and Asia from the late Eocene or early Oligocene, looked similar to the modern fossa, while Proailurus, an extinct form of cat, exhibited many viverrid-like characteristics. Despite these similarities in the fossil record, the modern Malagasy carnivores are distinctly different, with the Euplerinae and Galidiinae subfamilies bearing similarities with civets and mongooses, respectively. Species in Euplerinae (including the fossa, falanouc, and Malagasy civet) have auditory regions similar to those of viverrids, while those in Galidiinae have auditory regions similar to those of herpestids. Based on this trait, Robert M. Hunt Jr. proposed in 1996 that Madagascar was colonized twice, once by viverrids and once by herpestids. However, the genetic studies by Yoder and colleagues in 2003 suggested that a single colonization event occurred by a primitive herpestid ancestor, which was quickly followed by adaptive radiation. The common ancestor arrived from Africa, probably by rafting, during the late Oligocene or early Miocene (24–18 Mya), though Philippe Gaubert and Veron estimated a divergence date of 19.4 Mya (16.5–22.7 Mya). Mitochondrial genetic analysis by Hassanin et al. (2021) suggests euplerines and galidiines split off 16.4-17.6 Mya. Analysis on the morphological disparity of the skulls of euplerids reveals the family didn't have an exceptional rate of diversification despite showing greater disparity in their skulls than most feliform families. This suggests euplerids evolved via adaptive non-radiation.

=== Classification ===
Family Eupleridae
| Subfamily | Genus | Species | Image |
|---|---|---|---|
| Euplerinae | Cryptoprocta (Bennett, 1833) | Fossa (C. ferox); †Giant fossa (C. spelea); †Cryptoprocta bevatabe (C. bevatabe) | |
| Euplerinae | Eupleres (Doyère, 1835) | Eastern falanouc (E. goudotii); Western falanouc (E. major) | |
| Euplerinae | Fossa (Gray, 1864) | Malagasy civet (F. fossana) | |
| Galidiinae | Galidia (I. Geoffroy Saint-Hilaire, 1837) | Ring-tailed vontsira (G. elegans) | |
| Galidiinae | Galidictis (I. Geoffroy Saint-Hilaire, 1839) | Broad-striped Malagasy mongoose (G. fasciata); Grandidier's mongoose (G. grandidieri) | |
| Galidiinae | Mungotictis (Pocock, 1915) | Narrow-striped mongoose (M. decemlineata) | |
| Galidiinae | Salanoia (Gray, 1864) | Durrell's vontsira (S. durrelli); Brown-tailed mongoose (S. concolor) | |

=== Phylogenetic tree ===
The phylogenetic relationships of Malagasy carnivorans (Eupleridae) are shown in the following cladogram:

- Eupleridae
  - Euplerinae
    - - Cryptoprocta
        - Cryptoprocta ferox (Fossa)
        - †Cryptoprocta spelea (Giant fossa)
      - Fossa
        Fossa fossana (Malagasy civet)
    - Eupleres
      - Eupleres major (Western falanouc)
      - Eupleres goudotii (Eastern falanouc)
  - Galidiinae
    - Galidia
      Galidia elegans (Ring-tailed vontsira)
    - - Galidictis
        - Galidictis fasciata (Broad-striped vontsira)
        - Galidictis grandidieri (Grandidier's mongoose)
      - - Salanoia
          - Salanoia durrelli (Durrell's vontsira)
          - Salanoia concolor (Brown-tailed vontsira)
        - Mungotictis
          Mungotictis decemlineata (Narrow-striped mongoose)

== See also ==
- List of mammals of Madagascar
