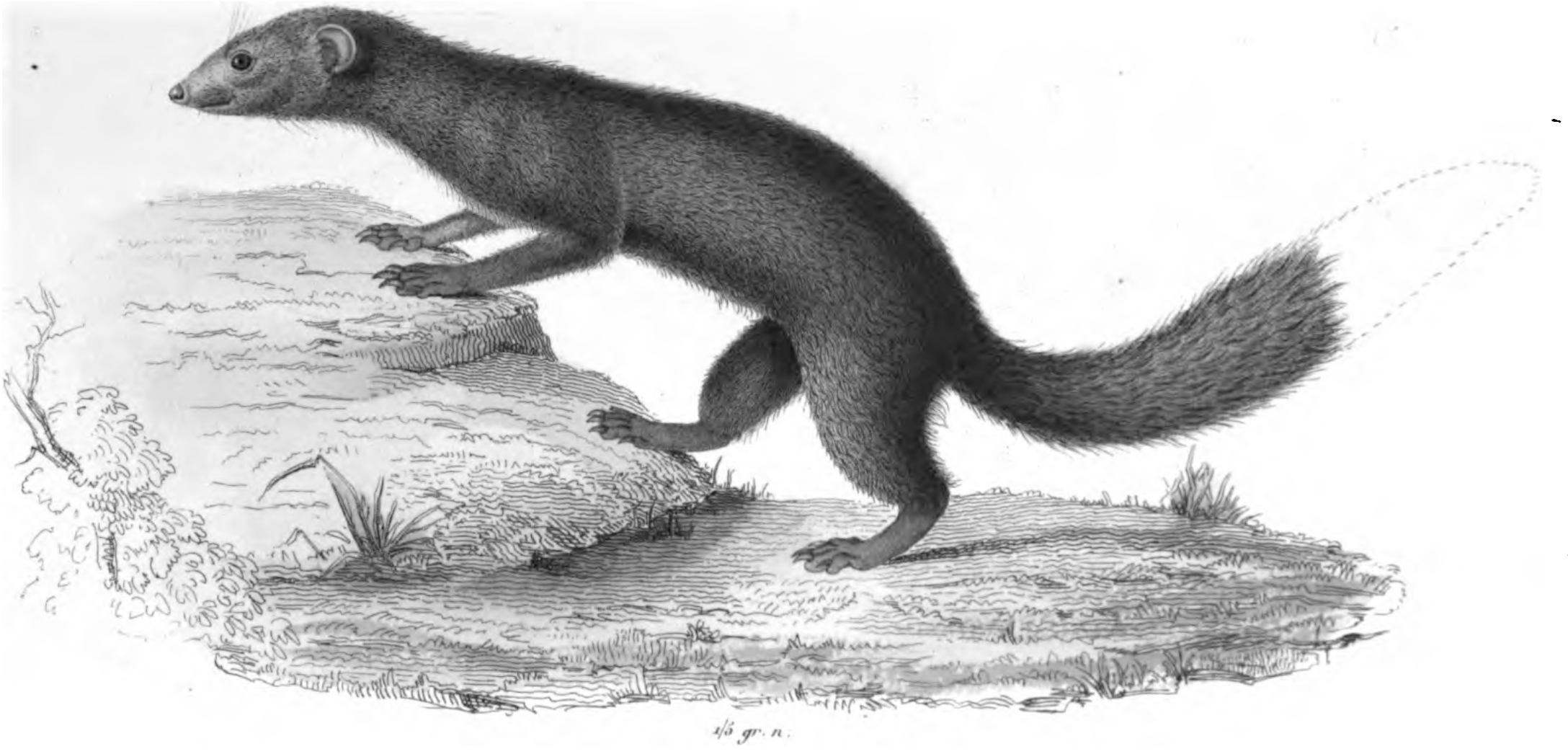
- Brown-tailed mongoose (Salanoia concolor)

Scientific classification
- Kingdom: Animalia
- Phylum: Chordata
- Class: Mammalia
- Order: Carnivora
- Family: Eupleridae
- Subfamily: Galidiinae
- Genus: Salanoia; Gray, 1864

Type species
- Galidia concolor I. Geoffroy Saint-Hilaire, 1837

Species
- Salanoia concolor; Salanoia durrelli
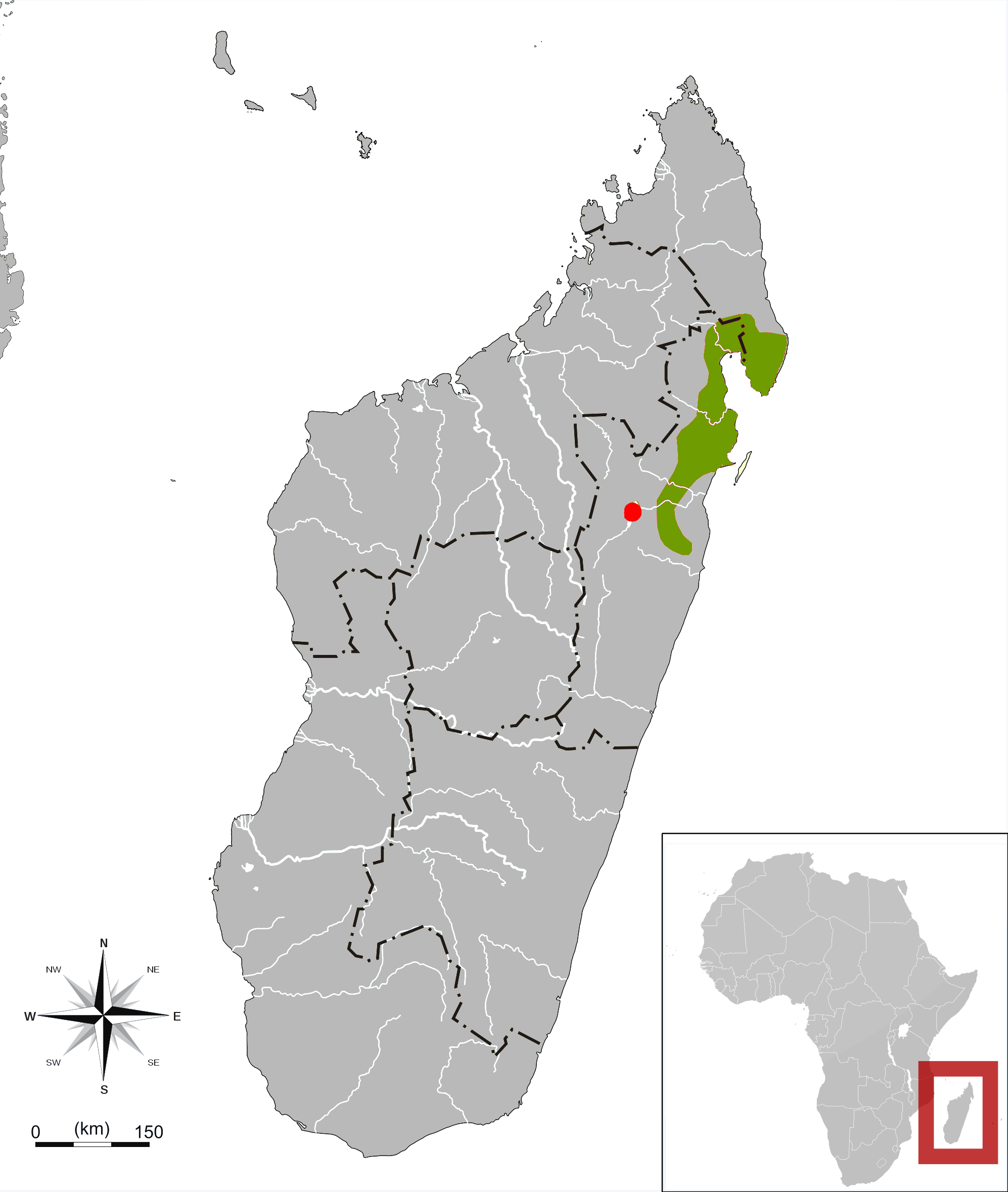
- Salanoia ranges

= Salanoia =

Genus of carnivores

Salanoia is a genus of euplerid carnivoran with two currently described species found in Madagascar. They are mongoose-like, which is reflected in the older versions of their English names, for example brown-tailed mongoose which is now called brown-tailed vontsira. The name Salanoia is derived from salano, one of the vernacular names for Salanoia concolor.

Vontsira is a Malagasy vernacular name that seems to apply to a few local species of local mongoose-like carnivores in the related genera Salanoia, Galidia, and Galidictis.

There have been new specimens found of Salanoia in Lac Alaotra, Madagascar. This new species have different physical characteristics from S. Concolor but have genetic similarities. However, there is morphological divergence that justifies this specimen as a new species of Salanoia.
