= Eastern falanouc =

Conservation status
- Vulnerable (IUCN 3.1)
- CITES Appendix II

Scientific classification
- Kingdom: Animalia
- Phylum: Chordata
- Class: Mammalia
- Order: Carnivora
- Family: Eupleridae
- Genus: Eupleres
- Species: E. goudotii

Binomial name
- Eupleres goudotii Doyère, 1835
- Eupleres range

Species of carnivore

The eastern falanouc (Eupleres goudotii) is a rare mongoose-like mammal in the carnivoran family Eupleridae endemic to Madagascar .

Until 2010, both falanoucs were classified as the same species, Eupleres goudotii, which was the only species in the genus Eupleres. Then the falanouc was split into two species, eastern falanouc (Eupleres goudotii) and western falanouc (Eupleres major). Falanoucs have several peculiarities. They have no anal or perineal glands (unlike their closest relative, the fanaloka), nonretractile claws, and a unique dentition: the canines and premolars are backwards-curving and flat. This is thought to be related to their prey, mostly invertebrates, such as worms, slugs, snails, and larvae.

It lives primarily in the lowland rainforests of eastern Madagascar, while E. major is found in northwest Madagascar. It is solitary and territorial, but whether nocturnal or diurnal is unknown. It is small (about 50 centimetres long with a 24-centimetre-long tail) and shy (clawing, not biting, in self-defence). It most closely resembles the mongooses with its long snout and low body, though its colouration is plain and brown (most mongooses have colouring schemes such as striping, banding, or other variations on the hands and feet).

Its life cycle displays periods of fat buildup during April and May, before the dry months of June and July. It has a brief courting period and weaning period, the young being weaned before the next mating season. Its reproductive cycle is fast. The offspring (one per litter) are born in burrows with opened eyes and can move with the mother through dense foliage at only two days old. In nine weeks, the already well-developed young are on solid food and shortly thereafter they leave their mothers. Though it is fast in gaining mobility (so as to follow its mother on forages), it grows at a slower rate than comparatively-sized carnivorans.

"Falanoucs are threatened by habitat loss, humans, dogs and an introduced competitor, the small Indian civet (Viverricula indica)."

Viverricula indica are also carnivores, and they had much spatial and temporal overlap with Eupleres goudotii when introduced to the same ecosystem the Eupleres goudotii were in. This overlap has shown to potentially have a negative impact on native carnivore populations such as the Eupleres goudotii because of the two species competing for similar resources.

== Sources ==
- Macdonald, David (ed). The Encyclopedia of Mammals. (New York, 1984)
