= Western falanouc =

Conservation status
- Endangered (IUCN 3.1)

Scientific classification
- Kingdom: Animalia
- Phylum: Chordata
- Class: Mammalia
- Infraclass: Placentalia
- Order: Carnivora
- Family: Eupleridae
- Genus: Eupleres
- Species: E. major

Binomial name
- Eupleres major Lavauden, 1929

Species of carnivore

The western falanouc (Eupleres major) is a rare mongoose-like mammal endemic to Madagascar. Until recently, both falanoucs were classified as a single species, Eupleres goudotii, and this was the only species in the genus Eupleres. In 2010, Goodman and Helgen provided morphological evidence showing the two falanoucs are each a separate species (with Eupleres goudotii being redefined as the eastern falanouc) and are found in separate geographical locations. E. major is larger and browner compared to E. goudotii and has a diet consisting mainly of invertebrates such as worms, snails, and slugs.

Knowledge of the western falanouc's ecology is limited, but its range is believed to be limited to dry deciduous forest, flooded palm savanna, and wetlands. E. major is known to occur in Ankarafantsika National Park and is believed to also be found in or near other local national parks and reserves. The main predators of the western falanouc are feral dogs and humans. E. major is currently listed as endangered on the IUCN Red List of Endangered Species. Trade and use are currently unknown, but the population has dramatically decreased by 50% due to various factors such as hunting and ongoing habitat conversion and fragmentation. More research of E. major is needed to further understand the species and work on conservation efforts to protect the declining population.

== Taxonomy ==
The western falanouc belongs to the family Eupleridae, a family that is endemic to Madagascar. Molecular comparisons have shown that all native Malagasy carnivora genera, including Eupleres, form a monophyletic group known as Eupleridae. For many years, it was believed that the western falanouc was a subspecies of the eastern falanouc. In 2010, scientists Goodman and Helgen were able to provide morphological evidence to prove that these were in fact two separate species of falanoucs. Although similar in appearance, these two species are geographically separated.

== Description and range ==
Similar in appearance, E. major has been found to have a consistently larger body size when compared to E. goudotii. Its fur is distinctly darker brown instead of the overall greyish-brown coat of E. goudotii, however both species are paler ventrally than dorsally. There is a suggestion that males are larger than females, but more research is needed in order to confirm this assumption. The digital pads of E. major have been found to be significantly larger, inflated, and naked compared to the fur covered pads of E. goudotii. In general, E. major has a more robust skull, both in cranial length and breadth, and mandible. Their teeth are specialized and insectivore-like due to their diet. The two species have conspicuously different dentitions, which are more robust in E. major. One of the most noticeable diagnostic differences between these two species is the much more expansive auditory bullae in E. major. The western falanouc has been known to show nocturnal to crepuscular activity. In June 2011, the first known photograph of a western falanouc was taken by an Earthwatch volunteer in Ankarafantsika National Park during the day, despite claims of its nocturnal-crepuscular activity pattern.

Endemic to Madagascar, the western falanouc population is scarce and has a limited range in the deciduous forests of the northwest. Their range extends from near Baly Bay National Park, north through the Ankarafantsika and Analalava forests to the Sambirano, as far east as the foothills of Tsarantanana, Sahamalaza peninsula and possibly to the lower parts of Montagne d'Ambre.

== Ecology ==
Due to lack of research, little is known of the western falanouc's ecology. The number of mature individuals is currently unknown. According to the IUCN, generation time of E. major averages around 7.9 years. They inhabit dry deciduous forest on the edges of wetlands as well as flooded palm savanna near the forest. The wetlands they can be found in include bogs, marshes, swamps, fens, and peatlands. Their diet tends to consist of mainly worms, slugs, snails, and other invertebrates. The main predators of this species are feral dogs and humans.

== Conservation ==
The western falanouc is likely susceptible to hunting pressures, and habitat loss through logging, forest fires and charcoal production. Threats from invasive species are suspected, but the severity is unknown. The IUCN lists this species as endangered because of the dramatic population decline due to widespread hunting, persecution, the effects of introduced carnivores, and ongoing habitat conversion and fragmentation. Owing to the breakdown of governance, the rate of hunting has approximately doubled since the coup d'état in 2009, along with opportunistic rosewood cutting and pressure from feral cats and dogs throughout the species' range.

The range of the western falanouc is in at least one protected area (Ankarafantsika National Park) and is adjacent to another (Baly Bay National Park). It may also occur in Manongarivo Special Reserve, Ankarana National Park and Montagne d'Ambre National Park. Because the western falanouc was only recently considered its own species, it is not covered by CITES like the eastern falanouc is. There is currently no legislation in place to protect E. major. Information on the use and trade of the western falanouc is unknown, but it is assumed that they are hunted for food.
