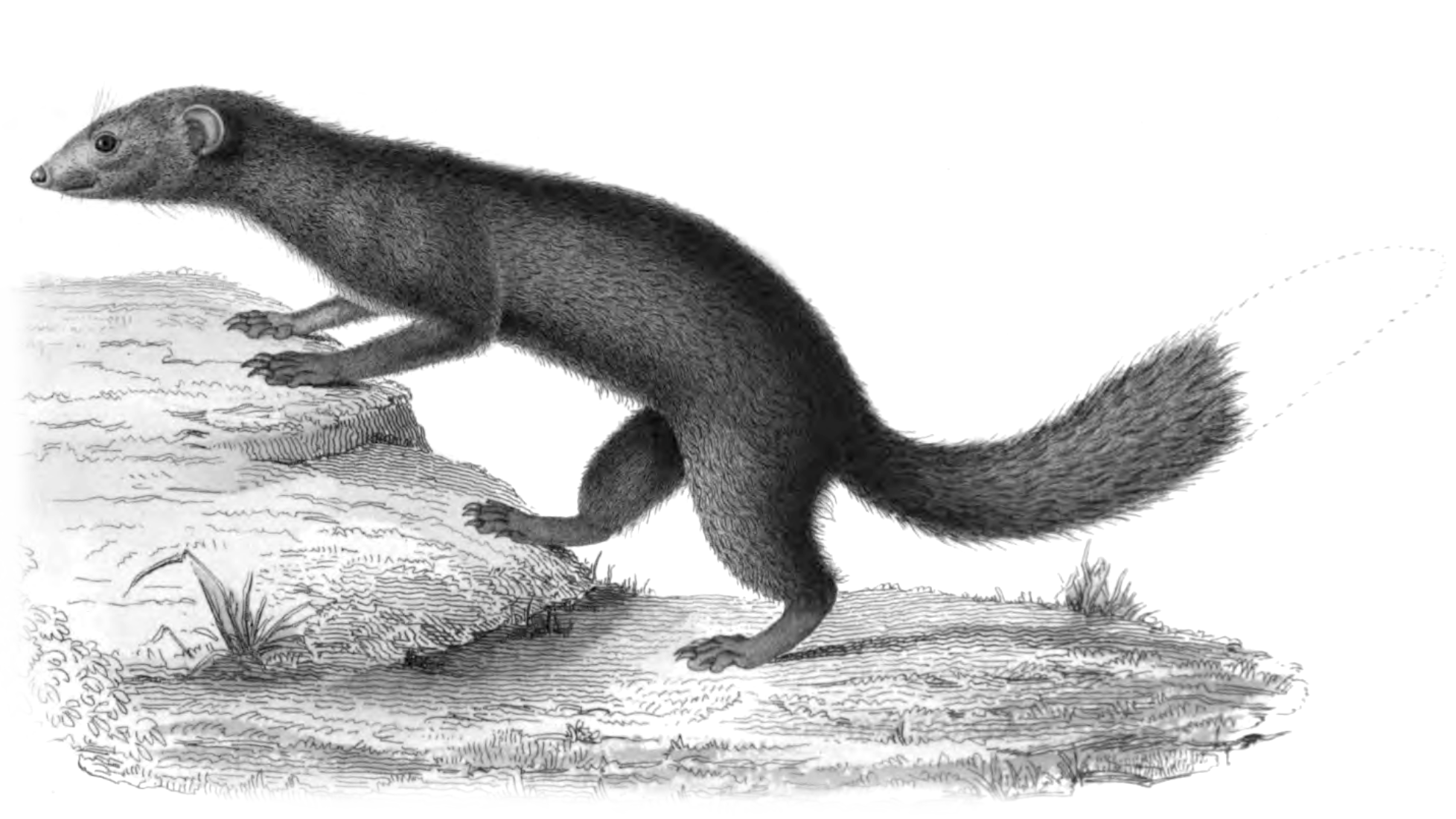
- Plate of Galidia olivacea, a synonym of the brown-tailed mongoose, from 1839. The tail is incomplete.

Conservation status
- Vulnerable (IUCN 3.1)

Scientific classification
- Kingdom: Animalia
- Phylum: Chordata
- Class: Mammalia
- Order: Carnivora
- Family: Eupleridae
- Genus: Salanoia
- Species: S. concolor

Binomial name
- Salanoia concolor (I. Geoffroy Saint-Hilaire, 1837)
- Brown-tailed mongoose range

= Brown-tailed mongoose =

Species of carnivore

The brown-tailed mongoose, brown-tailed vontsira, Malagasy brown-tailed mongoose, or salano (Salanoia concolor) is a species of mammal in the family Eupleridae. It is endemic to Madagascar. Its natural habitat is moist lowland tropical forest. It is threatened by habitat loss.

== Taxonomy ==
The brown-tailed mongoose was first described in 1837 by French zoologist Isidore Geoffroy Saint-Hilaire under the names Galidia unicolor and Galidia olivacea. He placed both in the genus Galidia, together with the ring-tailed mongoose (Galidia elegans), which is now recognized as the only species of that genus. However, the name unicolor had been a misprint for concolor, and the name was corrected in an erratum and in a later note by Geoffroy Saint-Hilaire. In 1865, (Note: The description appeared in the Proceedings of the Zoological Society of London for 1864, but the Proceedings often did not appear in the year they were for, and Salanoia was published in May 1865.) John Edward Gray placed concolor and olivacea in their own subgenus of Galidia, which he called Salanoia. In 1882, St. George Jackson Mivart also separated olivacea and concolor from Galidia, and placed them in a separate genus Hemigalidia, without mentioning Salanoia. In his 1904 Index generum mammalium, Palmer noted that Salanoia, the first name to be published, was the proper name for the genus. Although Glover Morrill Allen, in 1939, still listed two species, which he called Salanoia olivacea and S. unicolor, by 1972 R. Albignac recognized a single species only, which he called Salanoia concolor. A second species of Salanoia, Salanoia durrelli, was described in 2010.

== Literature cited ==
- Albignac, R. 1972. The Carnivora of Madagascar. Pp. 667–682 in Battistini, R. & Richard-Vindard, G. (eds.). Biogeography and Ecology in Madagascar. The Hague: W. Junk B.B., Publishers.
- Allen, G.M. 1939. A checklist of African mammals. Bulletin of the Museum of Comparative Zoology at Harvard College 83:1–763.
- Durbin, Joanna; Funk, Stephan M.; Hawkins, Frank; Hills, Daphne M.; Jenkins, Paulina D.; Moncrieff, Clive B.; Ralainasolo, Fidimalala Bruno (2010). "Investigations into the status of a new taxon of Salanoia(Mammalia: Carnivora: Eupleridae) from the marshes of Lac Alaotra, Madagascar". Systematics and Biodiversity. 8 (3): 341–355. Bibcode:2010SyBio...8..341D. doi:10.1080/14772001003756751. S2CID 84480153.
- Geoffroy Saint-Hilaire, I. 1837. Notice sur deux nouveaux genres de Mammifères carnassiers, les Ichneumies, du continent africain, et les Galidies, de Madagascar. Comptes rendus hebdomadaires des séances de l'Académie des sciences 5:578–582 (in French). Errata.
- Geoffroy Saint-Hilaire, I. 1839. Notice sur deux nouveaux genres de mammifères carnassiers, les Ichneumies, du continent African, et les Galidies, de Madagascar. Magasin de Zoologie (2)1:1–39.
- Gray, J.E. 1865. A revision of the genera and species of viverrine animals (Viverridae) founded on the collection in the British Museum. Proceedings of the Zoological Society of London 1864:502–579.
- Hawkins, F. (2016). "Salanoia concolor". IUCN Red List of Threatened Species. 2016 e.T19852A45202205. doi:10.2305/IUCN.UK.2016-1.RLTS.T19852A45202205.en.
- Mivart, St.G. 1882. On the classification and distribution of the Aeluroidea. Proceedings of the Zoological Society of London 1882:135–208.
- Palmer, T. 1904. Index generum mammalium: a list of the genera and families of mammals. North American Fauna 23:1–984.
- Wozencraft, W.C. 2005. Order Carnivora. Pp. 532–628 in Wilson, D.E. & Reeder, D.M. (eds.). Mammal Species of the World: a taxonomic and geographic reference. 3rd ed. Baltimore: The Johns Hopkins University Press, 2 vols., 2142 pp. ISBN 978-0-8018-8221-0
