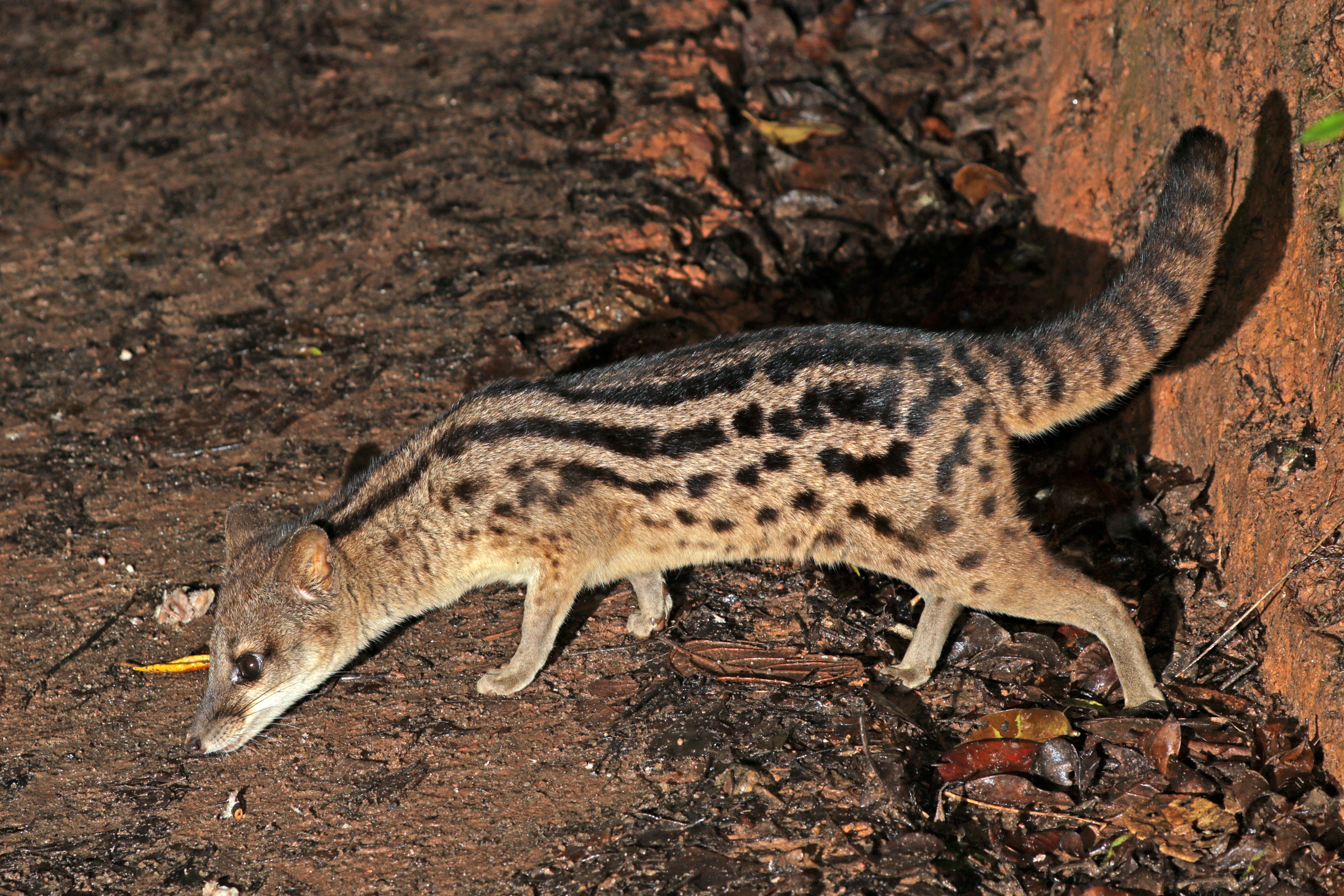
- at Ranomafana National Park

Conservation status
- Vulnerable (IUCN 3.1)
- CITES Appendix II

Scientific classification
- Kingdom: Animalia
- Phylum: Chordata
- Class: Mammalia
- Infraclass: Placentalia
- Order: Carnivora
- Family: Eupleridae
- Subfamily: Euplerinae
- Genus: Fossa; Gray, 1864
- Species: F. fossana

Binomial name
- Fossa fossana (Müller, 1776)
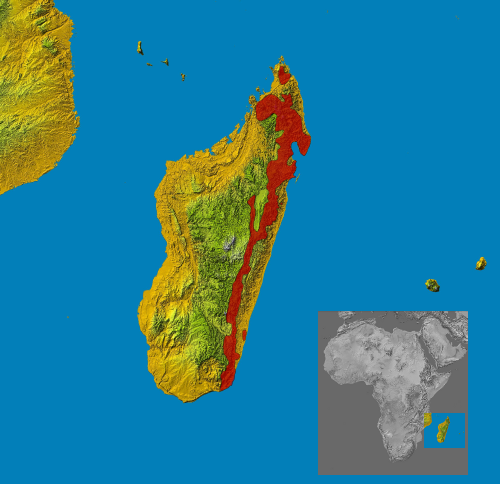
- Malagasy civet range

Synonyms
- Viverra fossana Müller, 1776

= Malagasy civet =

Species of carnivore

The Malagasy civet or striped civet (Fossa fossana), also known as the spotted fanaloka or simply fanaloka (Malagasy, [fə̥ˈnaluk]) or jabady, is an euplerid endemic to Madagascar. It is the only species in genus Fossa.

The Malagasy civet is a small mammal, about 47 centimetres (19 in) long excluding the tail (which is only about 20 centimetres (7.9 in)). It can weigh 1.5 to 2.0 kilograms (3.3 to 4.4 lb). It is endemic to the tropical forests of Madagascar. Malagasy civets are nocturnal. It eats small vertebrates, insects, aquatic animals, and eggs stolen from birds' nests. The mating season of the Malagasy civet is August to September and the gestation period is three months, ending with the birth of one young. The Malagasy civet is listed as Vulnerable by International Union for Conservation of Nature (IUCN).

The Malagasy name fanaloka is related to the Malay word pelanduk "mousedeer" (via metathesis) likely due to their similar sizes and silhouette.

== Classification ==
The Malagasy civet was to be placed in the subfamily Hemigalinae with the banded palm civets and then in its own subfamily, Fossinae, because of similarities with others in the group pointed out by Gregory, but it is now classified as a member of the subfamily Euplerinae, after Pocock pointed out more similarities with that one.

== Description ==
The Malagasy civet is a small mammal, about 47 centimetres (19 in) long excluding the tail (which is only about 20 centimetres (7.9 in)). The males can weigh up to 1.9 kilograms (4.2 lb), and the females can weigh up to 1.75 kilograms (3.9 lb). It is the second largest carnivore in Madagascar after the fossa. it may be confused with the small Indian civet (Viverricula indica). It has a short coat greyish beige or brown in colour, with dark black horizontal stripes running from head to tail, where the stripes are vertical, wrapping around the bushier tail. The stripes morph into spots near the belly. Its legs are short and very thin.

== Behavior ==
The Malagasy civet is nocturnal, though sources disagree over whether it is solitary or, unusual among euplerids, lives in pairs. It is not a good climber and frequents ravines. It eats small vertebrates (mammals, small birds, reptiles, and amphibians), insects, aquatic animals, and eggs stolen from birds' nests. It is shy and secretive. Their vocalizations are similar to crying and groaning, as well as a sound similar to coq-coq. Pairs of males and females defend a large area (around 50 hectares (120 acres)) as their territory. In the winter, it may store fat in its tail, which can make up 25% of their weight. The mating season of the Malagasy civet is August to September and the gestation period is around three months, ending with the birth of one young. The young are rather well-developed, weigh around 65 to 70 grams (2.3 to 2.5 oz), and are weaned in two to three months, leaving their parents at around one year old. The average lifespan of a Malagasy civet is about 21 years in captivity.

== Distribution and habitat ==
The Malagasy civet is found in lowland and rainforest areas of Eastern and Northern areas of Madagascar, and can also be found in humid and isolated forests in Amber Mountain National Park, and farther north in the less-humid forests of Ankarana Reserve. It can be found from sea level to 1,600 metres (5,200 ft) above sea level, but is only common up to 1,000 metres (3,300 ft) above sea level.

== Conservation status ==
The Malagasy civet is listed as Vulnerable by International Union for Conservation of Nature (IUCN), with a decreasing population. Though threatened by deforestation, hunting, charcoal production, logging, and competition from introduced species such as dogs, cats, and small Indian civets, it is locally common. Introduced animals such as dogs are likely to prey on Malagasy civets. Its range is now reduced to isolated patches.
