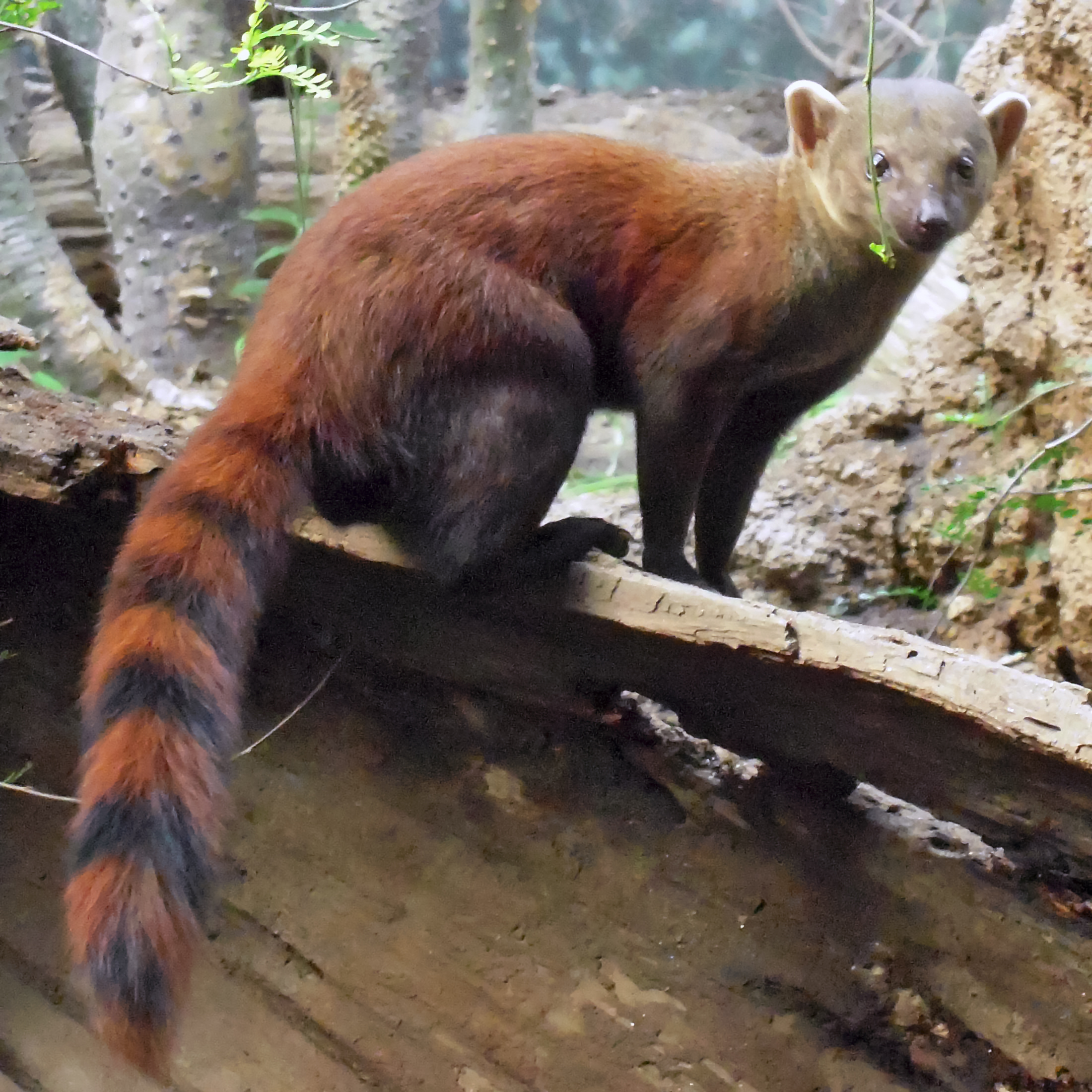
- Ring-tailed mongoose (Galidia elegans)

Scientific classification
- Kingdom: Animalia
- Phylum: Chordata
- Class: Mammalia
- Order: Carnivora
- Family: Eupleridae
- Subfamily: Galidiinae; Gray, 1865

Type genus
- Galidia I. Geoffroy Saint-Hilaire, 1837

Genera
- Galidia; Galidictis; Mungotictis; Salanoia
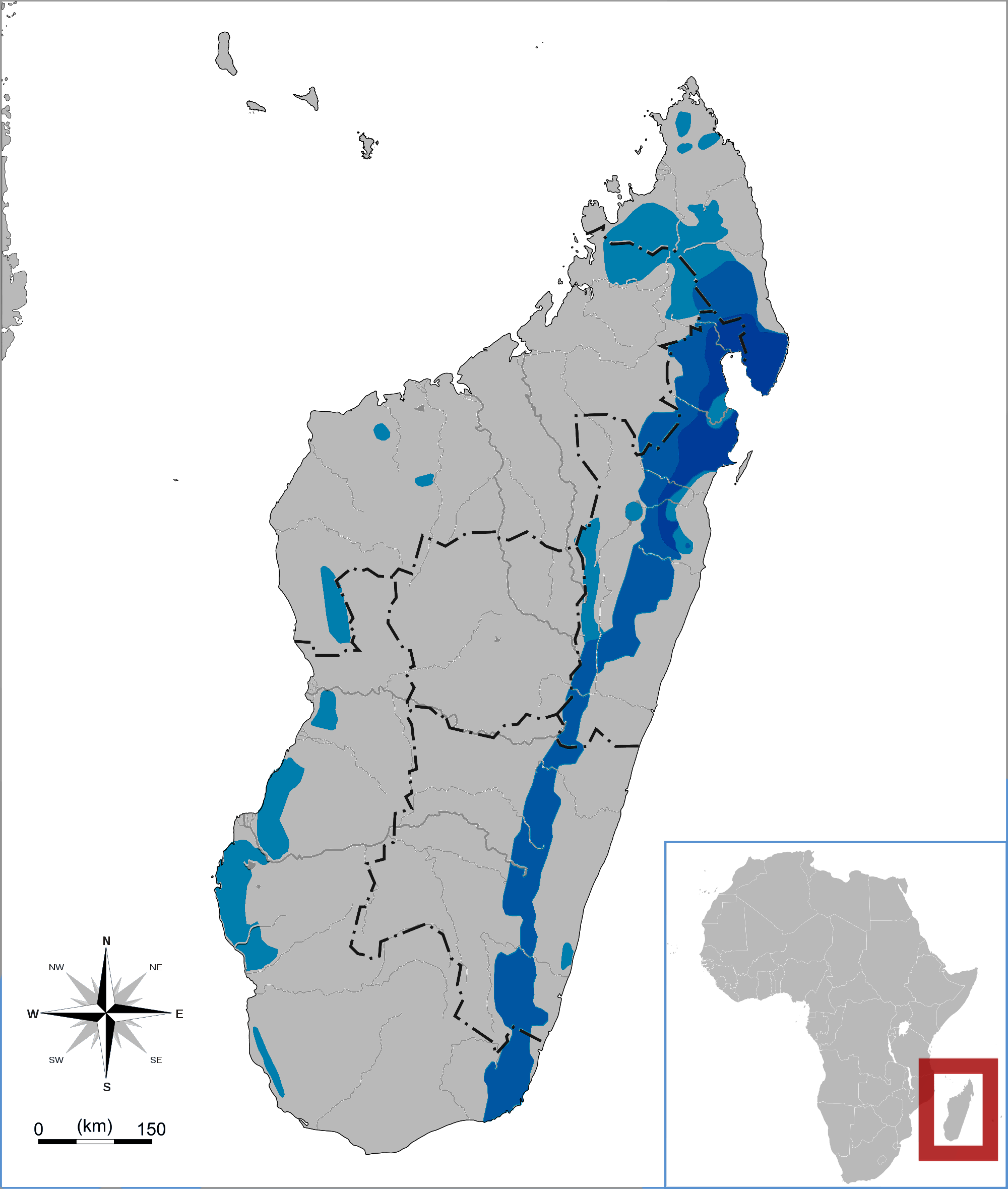
- Galidiinae diversity

= Galidiinae =

Vontsira

Subfamily of carnivores

Galidiinae, commonly known as vontsiras or Malagasy mongooses, is a subfamily of carnivorans that is restricted to Madagascar and includes six species classified into four genera. Together with the three other species of indigenous Malagasy carnivorans, including the fossa, they are currently classified in the family Eupleridae within the suborder Feliformia. Galidiinae are the smallest of the Malagasy carnivorans, generally weighing about 600 to 900 g. They are agile, short-legged animals with long, bushy ringed tails.

They closely resemble the mongooses (family Herpestidae) of continental Africa and southern Eurasia, with which they were classified until 2006, and accordingly they are said to be "mongoose-like" or even described as "Malagasy mongooses". The Malagasy name vontsira is a common name or alias for many species.

== Taxonomy ==
The relationship of galidiines to other carnivorans has historically been controversial. Up to the middle of the 20th century, all smaller feliforms, including members of the current families Viverridae, Herpestidae, and Eupleridae as well as some smaller groups, were classified in the single family Viverridae. Galidiines, which share some characters with both the civets and genets (current Viverridae) and the mongooses (Herpestidae), were allied early on both with the former and the latter, with some going as far as to doubt that they should be placed in a different subfamily than the other mongooses.

When the classification of the mongooses as a family separate from Viverridae gained wide acceptance around 1990, the galidiines were classified with them in the family Herpestidae, an arrangement supported by cladistic analysis of morphological data. In the early 2000s, molecular phylogenetic inferences, based on data from several genes, provided evidence for a close relationship between galidiines and other Malagasy carnivorans to the exclusion of mainland feliforms. Accordingly, they were all reclassified into a single family, Eupleridae, which is most closely related to the mongooses of the family Herpestidae.

Within the family Eupleridae, some relations remain unclear, with evidence from several genes and methods of inference providing conflicting evidence as to the relations among Galidiinae, the fossa, and the Malagasy civet (Fossa fossana). Molecular evidence suggests that Galidia was the earliest to diverge of the four galidiine genera and that Mungotictis and Salanoia are each other's closest relatives. Morphological evidence, on the other hand, supports the relation between Mungotictis and Salanoia, but suggests that Galidictis was the earliest lineage to diverge.

=== Classification ===
The subfamily includes the following genera and species:

Subfamily Galidiinae
Genus	Species	Image
Galidia (I. Geoffroy Saint-Hilaire, 1837)	Ring-tailed vontsira (G. elegans)	
Galidictis (I. Geoffroy Saint-Hilaire, 1839)	Broad-striped vontsira (G. fasciata); Grandidier's vontsira (G. grandidieri)	
Mungotictis (Pocock, 1915)	Narrow-striped vontsira (M. decemlineata)	
Salanoia (Gray, 1864)	Durrell's vontsira (S. durrelli); Brown-tailed vontsira (S. concolor)	

=== Phylogenetic tree ===
The phylogenetic relationships of Galidiinae are shown in the following cladogram:

- Galidiinae
  - Galidia
    Galidia elegans (Ring-tailed vontsira)
  - - Galidictis
      - Galidictis fasciata (Broad-striped vontsira)
      - Galidictis grandidieri (Grandidier's vontsira)
    - - Salanoia
        - Salanoia durrelli (Durrell's vontsira)
        - Salanoia concolor (Brown-tailed vontsira)
      - Mungotictis
        Mungotictis decemlineata (Narrow-striped vontsira)

== Morphology ==
Galidiines range in size from the narrow-striped vontsira, which may weigh as little as 500 g (18 oz), to the ring-tailed vontsira, which can reach a weight of 1,500 g (53 oz). All are similar in general form to mongooses, sharing with them an agile body supported by short legs, as well as a long, bushy tail and a flat, long cranium. Each of the four genera has a distinctive color pattern reflected in its common name: the tail of the ring-tailed mongoose is ringed with brown and black bands; both species of Galidictis have the body covered with broad stripes; the narrow-striped mongoose also has stripes over the body, but they are narrower and less conspicuous; and the brown-tailed mongoose has a dark brown pelage without any rings or stripes. Most galidiines share a dental formula of 3.1.3.23.1.3.2, but both species of Salanoia are distinct in having a dental formula of 3.1.4.23.1.3.2.

== Ecology and behavior ==
Galidiines are generally found in forest, but the Grandidier's and narrow-striped mongooses live in open habitats. All species dig burrows for shelter, and several species may also use tree holes. All six species can be found on the ground, but the narrow-striped and ring-tailed mongooses also climb trees. Like true mongooses, galidiines are usually active during the day, with the exception of the two species of Galidictis. Breeding occurs during the (Southern Hemisphere) summer, except in Grandidier's mongoose, which breeds year-round. Usually, only a single young is born. The ring-tailed, Grandidier's, and brown-tailed mongooses live alone or in pairs, sometimes with their offspring, but the broad-striped Malagasy and narrow-striped mongooses also occur in larger social groups. The diet varies among the species, with the ring-tailed and broad-striped Malagasy mongooses eating mainly small vertebrates like lizards, frogs and rodents, and the other three species eating more invertebrates like insects and scorpions. The ring-tailed and brown-tailed mongooses are also known to eat fruit.

== See also ==
- List of mammals of Madagascar

== Literature cited ==
- Albignac, R. (1972). "The Carnivora of Madagascar". Biogeography and Ecology in Madagascar. Monographiae Biologicae. Vol. 21. pp. 667–682. doi:10.1007/978-94-015-7159-3_20. ISBN 978-94-015-7161-6.
- Durbin, Joanna; Funk, Stephan M.; Hawkins, Frank; Hills, Daphne M.; Jenkins, Paulina D.; Moncrieff, Clive B.; Ralainasolo, Fidimalala Bruno (2010). "Investigations into the status of a new taxon of Salanoia(Mammalia: Carnivora: Eupleridae) from the marshes of Lac Alaotra, Madagascar". Systematics and Biodiversity. 8 (3): 341–355. doi:10.1080/14772001003756751. S2CID 84480153.
- Flynn, John J.; Finarelli, John A.; Zehr, Sarah; Hsu, Johnny; Nedbal, Michael A. (2005). "Molecular Phylogeny of the Carnivora (Mammalia): Assessing the Impact of Increased Sampling on Resolving Enigmatic Relationships". Systematic Biology. 54 (2): 317–337. doi:10.1080/10635150590923326. PMID 16012099.
- Garbutt, N. 2007. Mammals of Madagascar: A Complete Guide. Yale University Press, 304 pp. ISBN 978-0-300-12550-4
- Gaubert, Philippe; Wozencraft, W. Chris; Cordeiro-Estrela, Pedro; Veron, Géraldine (2005). "Mosaics of Convergences and Noise in Morphological Phylogenies: What's in a Viverrid-Like Carnivoran?". Systematic Biology. 54 (6): 865–894. doi:10.1080/10635150500232769. PMID 16282167.
- Lydekker, R. 1894. A hand-book to the Carnivora. Part 1, Cats, civets, and mungooses. London: Allen.
- Nowak, R.M. 2005. Walker's Carnivores of the World. Johns Hopkins University Press, 313 pp. ISBN 978-0-8018-8032-2
- Pocock, R.I. (1915). "XLIV.—On some external characters of Galidia, Galidictis, and related genera". Annals and Magazine of Natural History. 16 (94): 351–356. doi:10.1080/00222931508693726.
- Wozencraft, W.C. 2005. Order Carnivora. Pp. 532–628 in Wilson, D.E. & Reeder, D.M. (eds.). Mammal Species of the World: a taxonomic and geographic reference. 3rd ed. Baltimore: The Johns Hopkins University Press, 2 vols., 2142 pp. ISBN 978-0-8018-8221-0
- Yoder, A.D. & Flynn, J.J. 2003. Origin of Malagasy Carnivora. Pp. 1253–1256 in Goodman, S.M. & Benstead, J. (eds.). The Natural History of Madagascar. University of Chicago Press.
- Yoder, Anne D.; Burns, Melissa M.; Zehr, Sarah; Delefosse, Thomas; Veron, Geraldine; Goodman, Steven M.; Flynn, John J. (2003). "Single origin of Malagasy Carnivora from an African ancestor". Nature. 421 (6924): 734–737. doi:10.1038/nature01303. PMID 12610623. S2CID 4404379.
