= Kirindy Forest =

Nature reserve in Madagascar

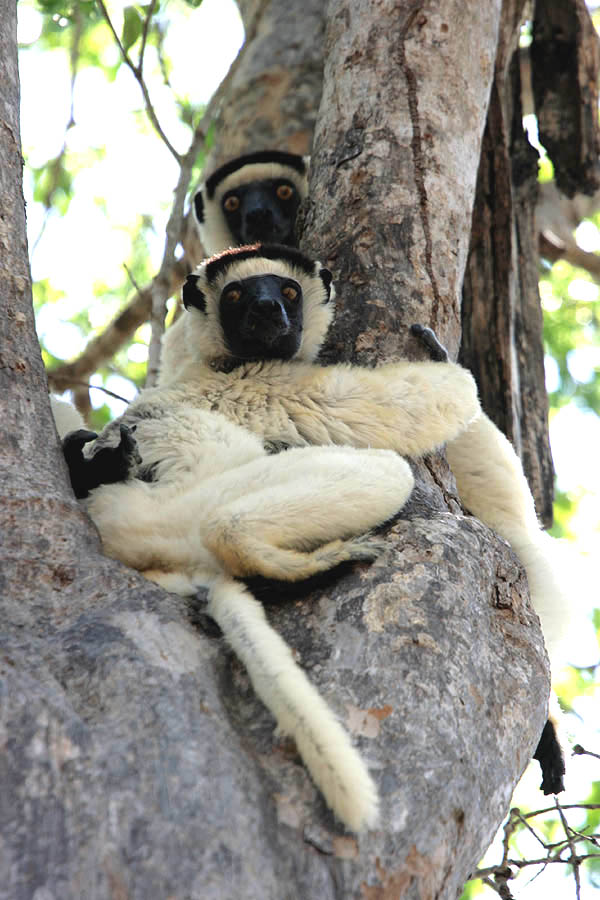
- Verreaux's sifaka pair at the Kirindy Forest Reserve.

Ecology
- Animals: Lemurs, reptiles, birds, fossa

Geography
- Area: 125 km^{2} (48 mi^{2})
- Country: Madagascar
- Coordinates: 20°49′S 44°09′E
- Climate type: Tropical, semi-tropical, arid, semi-desert

Conservation
- Conservation status: critically endangered

The Kirindy Forest (or Kirindy Private Reserve) is a private nature reserve situated in western Madagascar, about 50 km northeast of the town of Morondava, near Ambivy. The forest reserve falls within the boundaries of the Kirindy Mitea National Park, which spreads further to the south.

The forest goes through two general seasons each year: the dry season, from March to December, and the rainy season, from December to March. The forest is home to a wide variety of animals, from lemurs and fossas to geckos and chameleons, and numerous birds, the majority of which are found nowhere else. Many species of iconic plants are also found in the region, from baobabs and spiny palms to Alluaudia and euphorbs.

In its infancy, the forest reserve was operated based on a sustainable timber harvesting experiment, as deforestation is an issue which has not left the region unaffected. It is said, in Malagasy culture, that the forest was named ‘Kirindy’ long ago, meaning "dense forest with wild animals". As it is located in the northern area of the Kirindy Mitea National Park, the forest is also known as "Kirindy Nord", or ‘northern Kirindy’. Before being renamed Kirindy, the area was called the Swiss people’s forest ("la foret des Suisses"), as a Swiss company owns the piece of land.

== Geography and climate ==
=== Location ===
The Kirindy forest is located in western Madagascar, within the Kirindy Mitea National Park. It is situated 700 km away from the capital of the country, Antananarivo. Located in Central Menabe, it is part of a conservation priority area. The forest is in the Toliara (Tuléar) Province, situated 60 km south-west of the town of Morondava and approximately 21 km east of Belo‐sur‐Mer. Located at 44°39'E and 200 03'S. The Kirindy Forest is said to be one of the largest areas of protected dry forest in Madagascar. It is known for having a unique level of biodiversity.

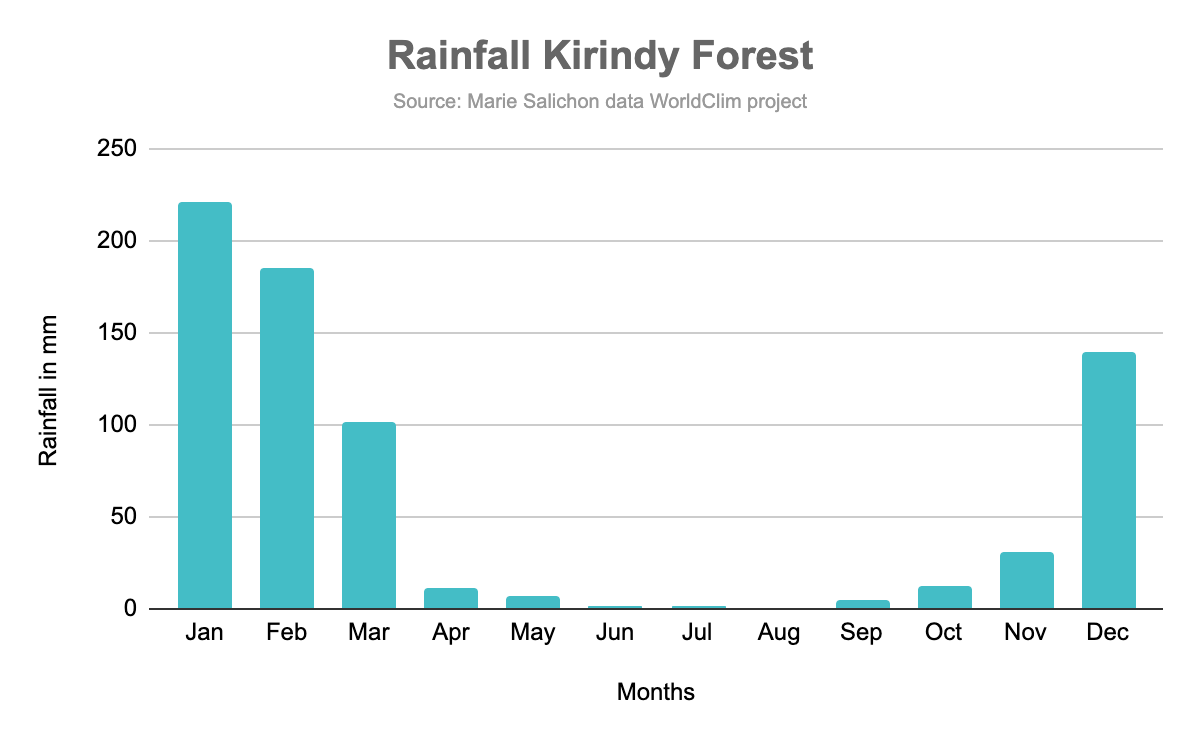
This graph shows how much rain falls in the forest depending on the seasons.

=== Climate ===
The Krindy Forest's climate is highly seasonal and tropical. The cold and dry season generally takes place from March - April to November - December of each year. A season during which most trees shed their leaves. The wet and hot season, also referred to as the rainy season typically takes place from November - December to March - April. Some precipitations can be observed during this season which makes, the forest that makes access more difficult, hard to access. The annual rainfall is concentrated throughout the brief rainy season with an average of approximately 800mm of rainfall every year in the region. Temperatures range yearly between 19 °C and 40 °C((104 °F)) with an annual mean of 25 °C.

== Fauna ==
The animal life of Kirindy includes over 65 species of reptiles and amphibians, 55 species of birds and 31 species of mammals, the majority of them found nowhere else on earth.

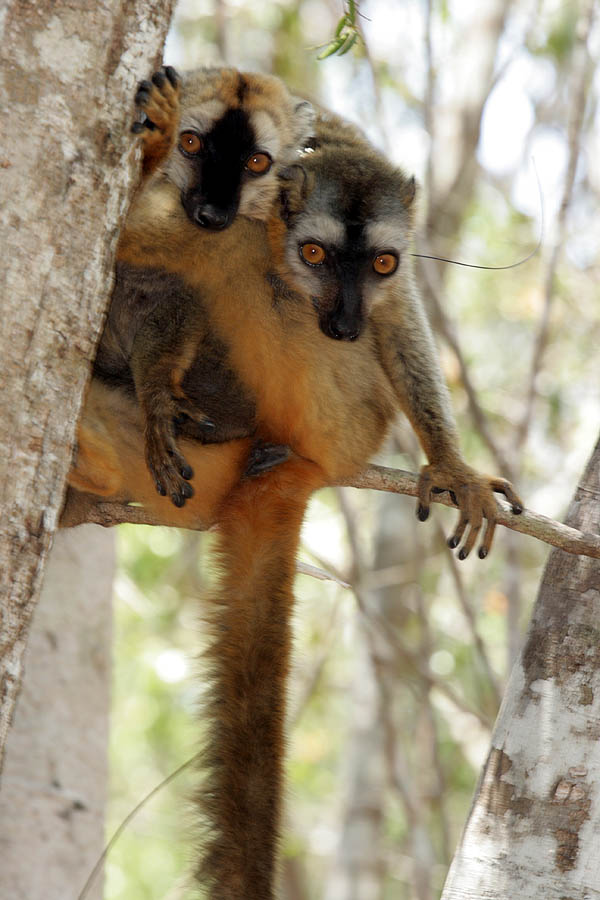
Red-fronted lemur at Kirindy

=== Mammals ===
There are a number of species of unique lemurs present, many of them nocturnal or crepuscular:

- Coquerel's giant mouse lemur
- Fat-tailed dwarf lemur
- Grey mouse lemur
- Madame Berthe's mouse lemur (the world's smallest primate)
- Pale fork-marked lemur
- Pygmy mouse lemur
- Red-fronted brown lemur
- Red-tailed sportive lemur
- Verreaux's sifaka

The Madame Berthe's mouse lemur (Microcebus berthae) is a diminutive, shy and nocturnal primate. This lemur is the smallest primate in the world (Gron 2009). The red-tailed sportive lemur is also present in the forest, a nocturnal lemur that weighs, on average, 800 g.

Other mammals at Kirindy include:

- Common tenrec
- Fossa
- Greater hedgehog tenrec
- Malagasy giant jumping rat
- Narrow-striped mongoose
- Ring-tailed vontsira

The fossa, a medium-sized, cat-like member of the mongoose family, is the apex predator of Kirindy (and indeed all of Madagascar), apart from humans; its diet is largely made-up of lemurs, and the primates are constantly on the lookout for prowling fossas. According to, by 2050, the fossa will be driven to extinction if the deforestation rates continue to climb. The Malagasy giant jumping rat (Hypogeomys antimena) is endangered due to multiple factors, such as habitat loss, slow gestation or reproductive rates, and gradually human-limited range. The Kirindy Forest may be the best-known (if not the only) location where the species still occurs. This endemic rat can hop, like a miniature kangaroo (though it is not a marsupial), but is also seen walking on all four limbs.

=== Amphibians and Reptiles ===
Madagascar is home to a great number of endemic species, Ninety‐nine per cent of Madagascar's known amphibians and 95% of Madagascar's reptiles are endemic. Kirindy Forest has around 50 species of reptiles, including 11 species of snakes and 7 species of chameleons. Some of the local reptiles present are: Labord's chameleon, various plated lizards, Henkel's leaf-tailed gecko, big-headed gecko, Madagascar ground boa, giant hog-nosed snake, spear-nosed snake and kapidolo. 99 per cent of Madagascar's frogs are endemic. This high rate of endemicity is due to the isolation of the island and the fact that it has experienced insularity for a long time. About 4 per cent of the world's anuran species are found only in Madagascar. Various amphibians are present in the forest. They can all be grouped into three different families. The Ptychadenidae with the Ptychadena mascareniensis, a frog ranging between 35 and 40mm. This species is active throughout the day. The Mocquardʹs rain frog’ is part of the Microhylidae family. It is one of Madagascar's smallest amphibians. It is active at night only during the rainy season. The frog spends the dry season buried underground. The forest is also home to the Antsohy tomato frog’, another amphibian of the microhylidae family. The Mantellidae family has been newly defined and is said to be the largest lineage of frogs on Madagascar. Madagascar has both the largest and smallest species of Chameleons in the world, the forest being home to two species. The Furcifer nicosiai that can only be found in the Kirindy Forest and in the Tsingy de Bemaraha. The Furcifer oustaleti, the largest chameleon in the world as it can reach a total length of 680mm.

== Flora ==
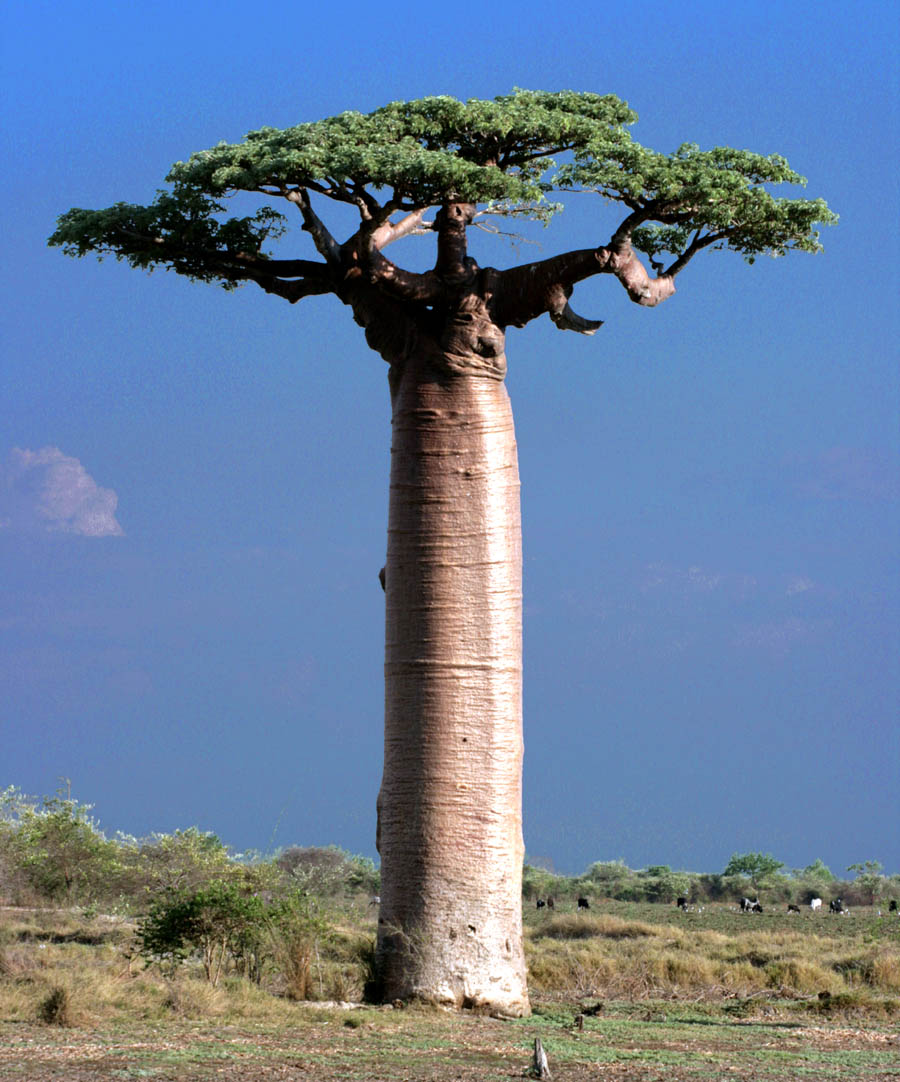
Adansonia grandidieri

=== Trees and Plants ===
Madagascar is known to have a very rich flora with thousands of different species of trees and plants. The Kirindy forest is home to much endemic flora. Three main species of baobab trees can be found there. Most of the canopy top is about 14 meters in height, but in wetter parts (e.g. in riparian zones) it may almost triple in vertical extent. There are three species of baobab trees present: Adansonia grandidieri, Adansonia rubrostipa and Adansonia za. The Adansonia rubrostipa also known as fony baobab. It usually has a bottle shaped trunk with major horizontal branches. It can range between 5 and 20 meters. The Adansonia za, a tall tree that ranges from 20 to 30 meters also grows in the forest. Another baobab species endemic to the forest is the Adansonia grandidieri, also known as Grandidier's baobab. This endemic tree is the biggest of the six species of baobab. Measuring up to 30 meters.

=== Fruits ===
These trees and plants develop an important number of fruits yearly which are contributing to the biodiversity of the forest. By the beginning of the rainy season, these fruits contain both seeds and pulp of high nutritive value which attract many insects and animals. The fruits produced in the Kirindy Forest are mainly baobab tree fruits. These fruits usually ripe from the end of the dry season. They are rich in vitamin C. They are used for human food and livestock. They are also eaten by lemurs. The fruits contain seeds and roots that are little used. They can however be sold in Toliara. Another common fruit in the forest is the Baudouinia fluggeiformis Baill.

== Threats and conservation ==
=== Deforestation ===
The highest rate of deforestation in Madagascar between 2000 and 2005 was observed in spiny and dry forests. With rates respectively, at 1.11% and 0.42% per year.The region has also suffered from a really high rate of deforestation with more than 30% of the spiny forest lost between 1970 and 2000. In the last 20 years, the local population of Central Menabe has been subject to marginalisation since more than 40000 ha of land were converted into rice fields. These fields were granted to the expatriates and Malagasy “elites”. These conversions have been a threat to the local population and fauna and flora of the region. The forest in particular has been impacted. The loss of faunal diversity is worsened by forest fragmentation. As the forest patches are too small to support viable populations. Mass deforestation remains present within the Kirindy region and has significantly increased in the last few years. Around 1000 hectares of forest were deforested each year from between 2000 and 2009. By 2014, this number had risen to 4000 hectares per year.

=== Fires ===
Due to a record number of fires, the loss of forests could reach 44.9% in 2020 and 83.1% by 2025. Many human - induced fires are also a source of endangerment to the Forest. Many factors such as forest layers, structure, species, richness, diversity, and composition are damaged and disturbed due to the fires. It is said that thousands of kilometres of forest are burnt down each year for the development of agriculture. Fires in the Kirindy forest are mainly caused by hunters, honey collectors or cattle breeders. Between 1984 and 2009 more than 83 hectares of forest were burnt down during the dry season (from May to October). Despite these recurrent fires, the more open canopy of the trees present allow a quicker natural regeneration process. It has been stated that fires in the Kirindy Forest tend to impact both the forest structure altering it's biodiversity of both Fauna and Flora but also the middle forest layer. According to scientists, the forest can recover within 12 years of a fire disturbance incident by respecting the tree density, basal area and species richness and diversity. However, the forest remains truly damaged as even 27 years later, the composition of the forest is still significantly different and altered.

=== Natural disasters ===
The Kirindy forest has also been threatened in the past by various natural disasters such as cyclones and hurricanes. The latest one being Cyclone Fanele, assessed as a category 3 storm. with sustained winds of 185 km/h and gusts up to 260 km/h according to Reunion Meteo France. This cyclone had an immediate impact on the forest and threatened much of its biodiversity. According to Whitehurst et al., 2009, Reforestation is the only apparent solution to preventing and reversing species loss. For now, all reforestation processes are natural. No initiatives of reforestation are on the way.

== Gallery ==
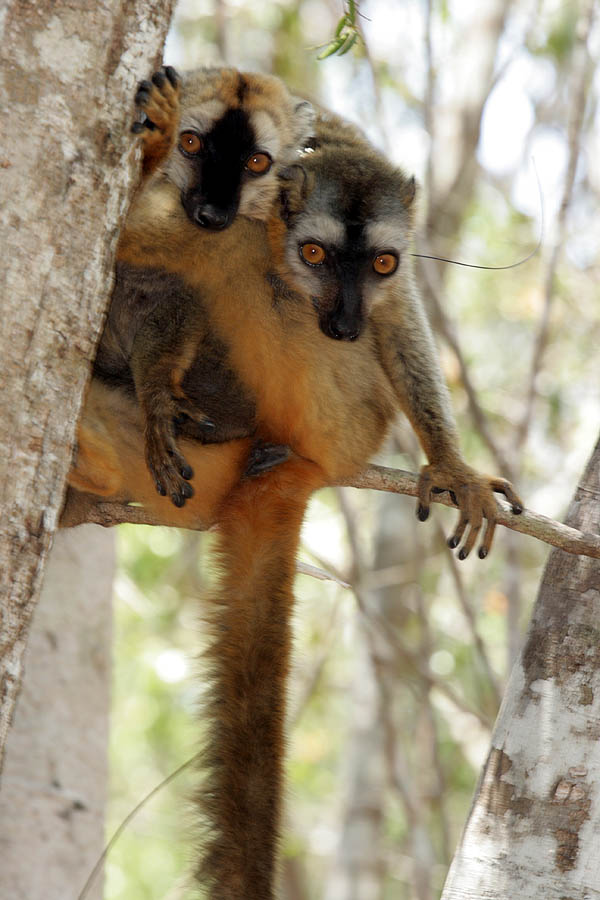
Red-fronted lemur at Kirindy

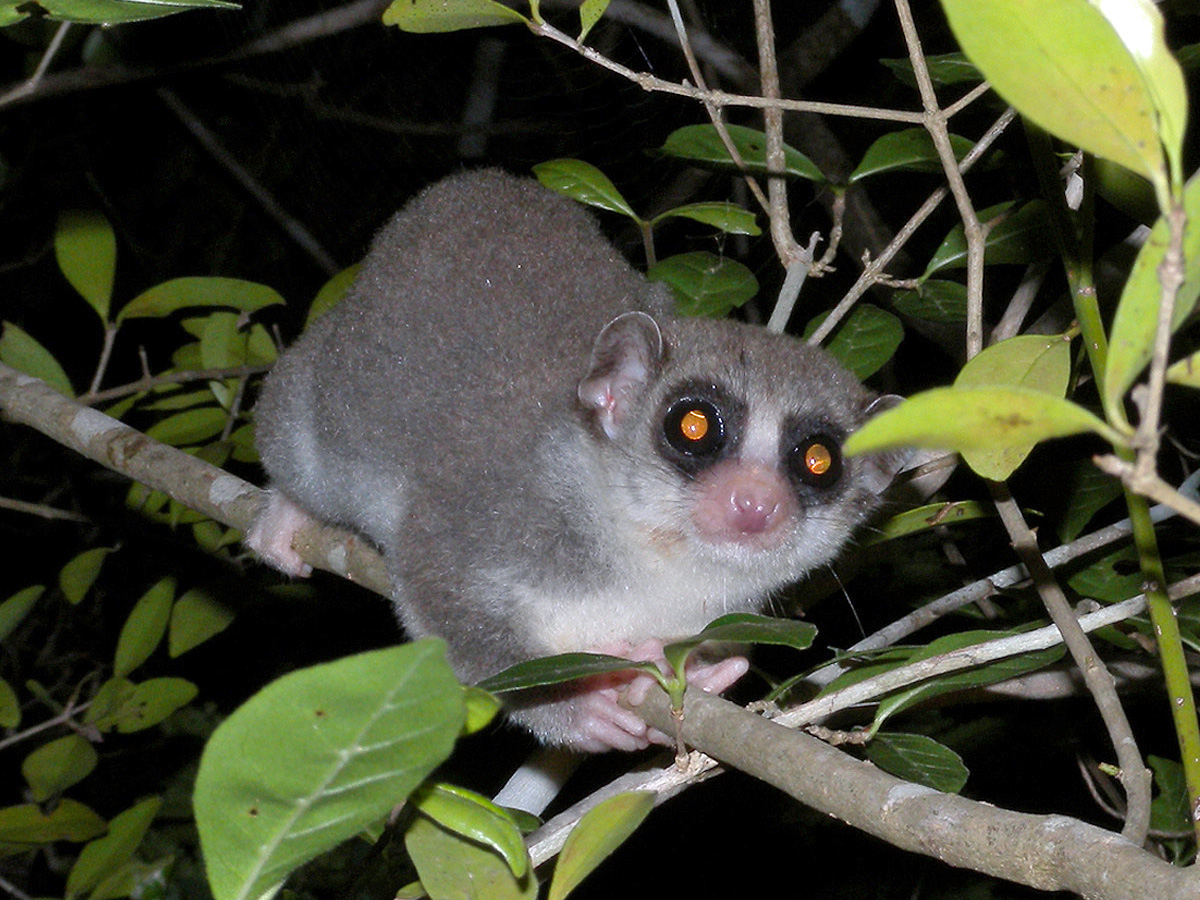
Fat-tailed dwarf lemur at Kirindy

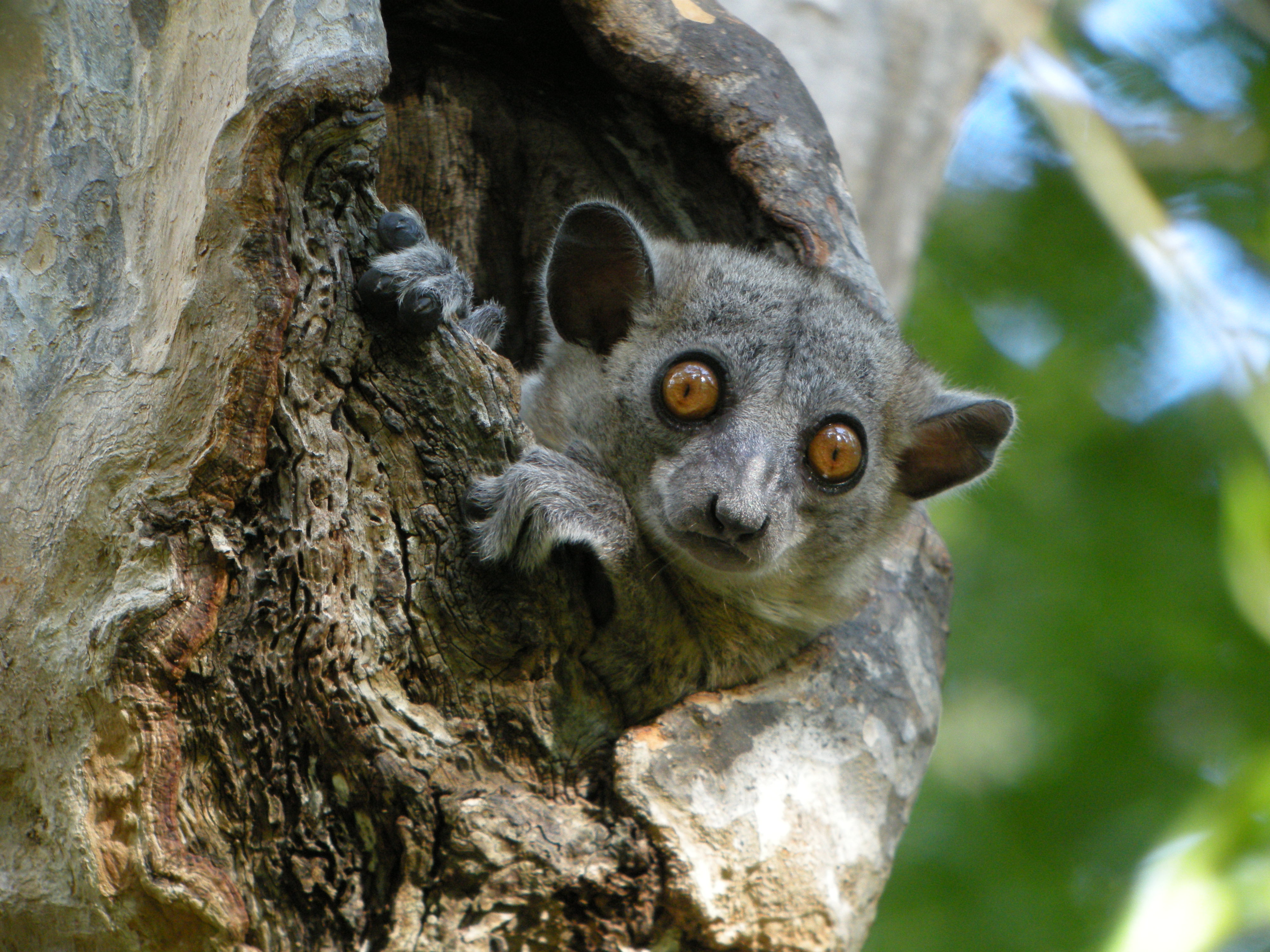
Red-tailed sportive lemur at Kirindy

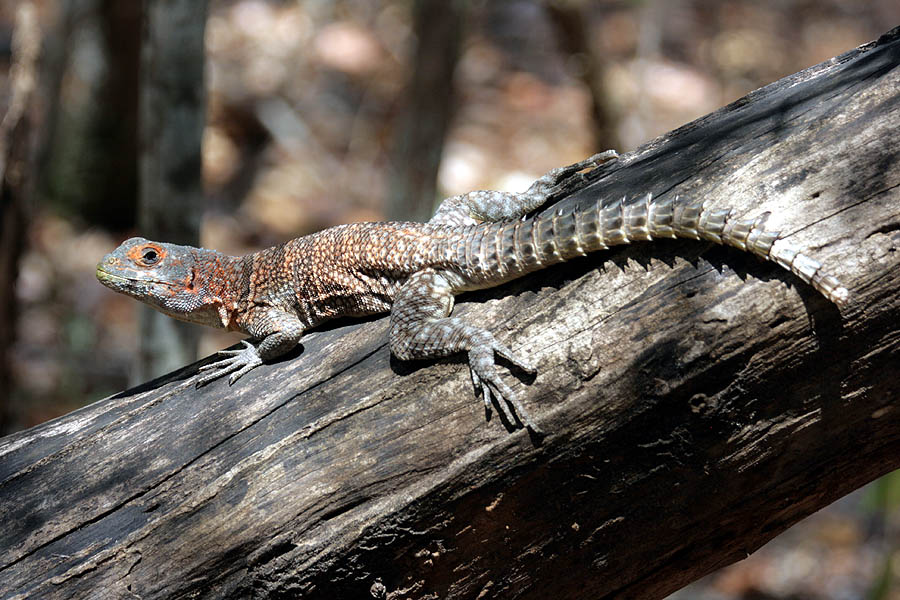
Oplurus cuvieri at Kirindy

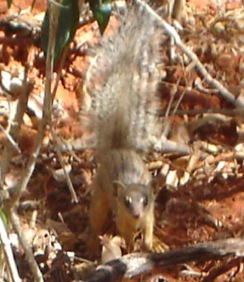
Narrow-striped Mongoose (Mungotictis decemlineata) at Kirindy

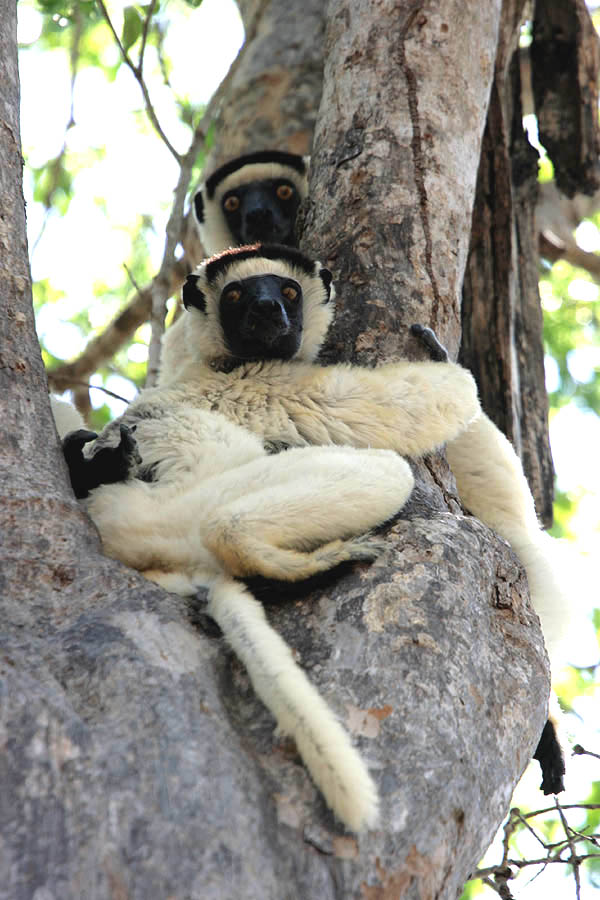
Verreaux's sifaka at Kirindy

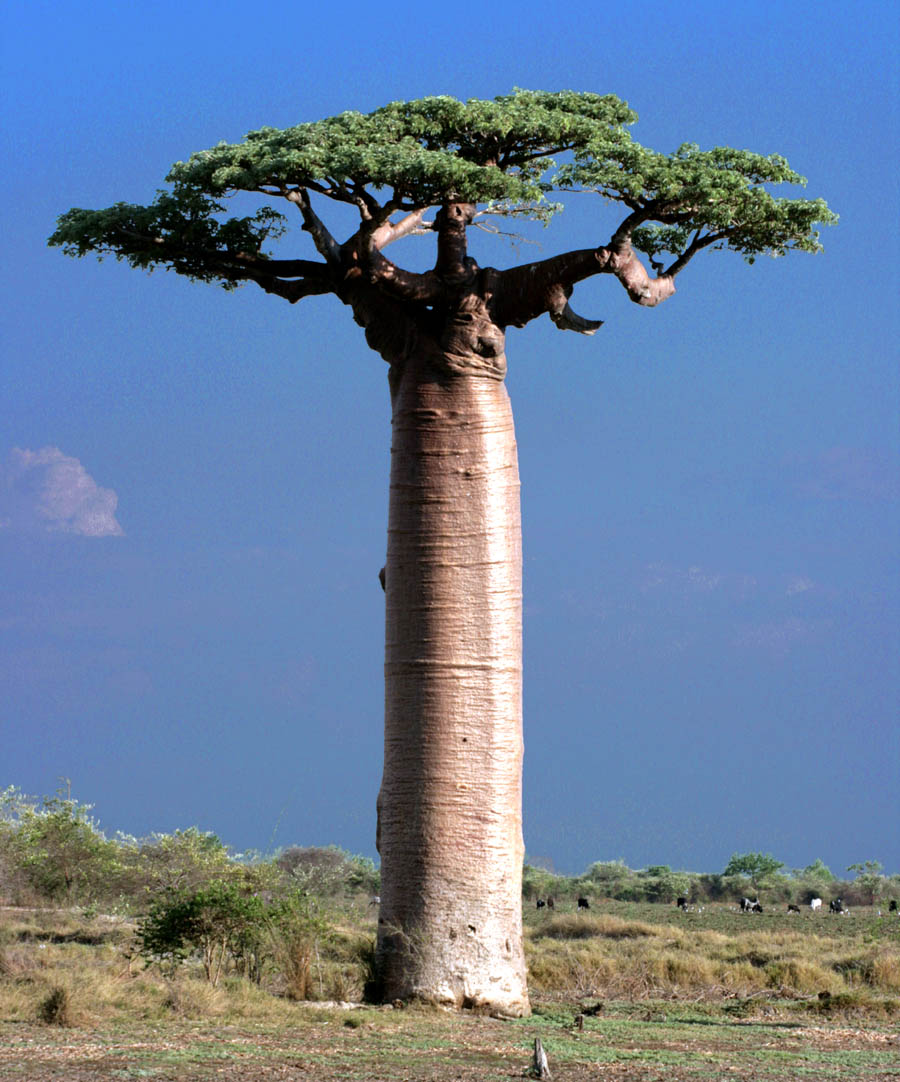
Adansonia grandidieri

== See also ==
- Madagascar succulent woodlands
