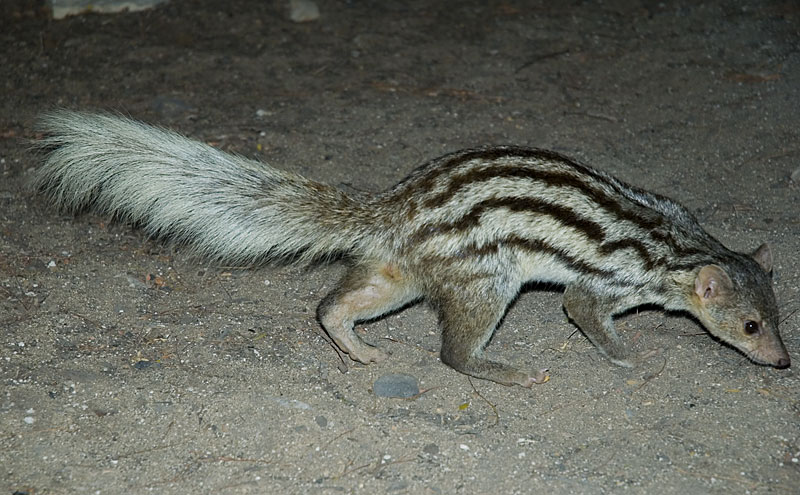
- Grandidier's mongoose (Galidictis grandidieri)

Scientific classification
- Kingdom: Animalia
- Phylum: Chordata
- Class: Mammalia
- Order: Carnivora
- Family: Eupleridae
- Subfamily: Galidiinae
- Genus: Galidictis; I. Geoffroy Saint-Hilaire, 1839

Type species
- Mustela striata I. Geoffroy Saint-Hilaire, 1837

Species
- Galidictis fasciata Galidictis grandidieri
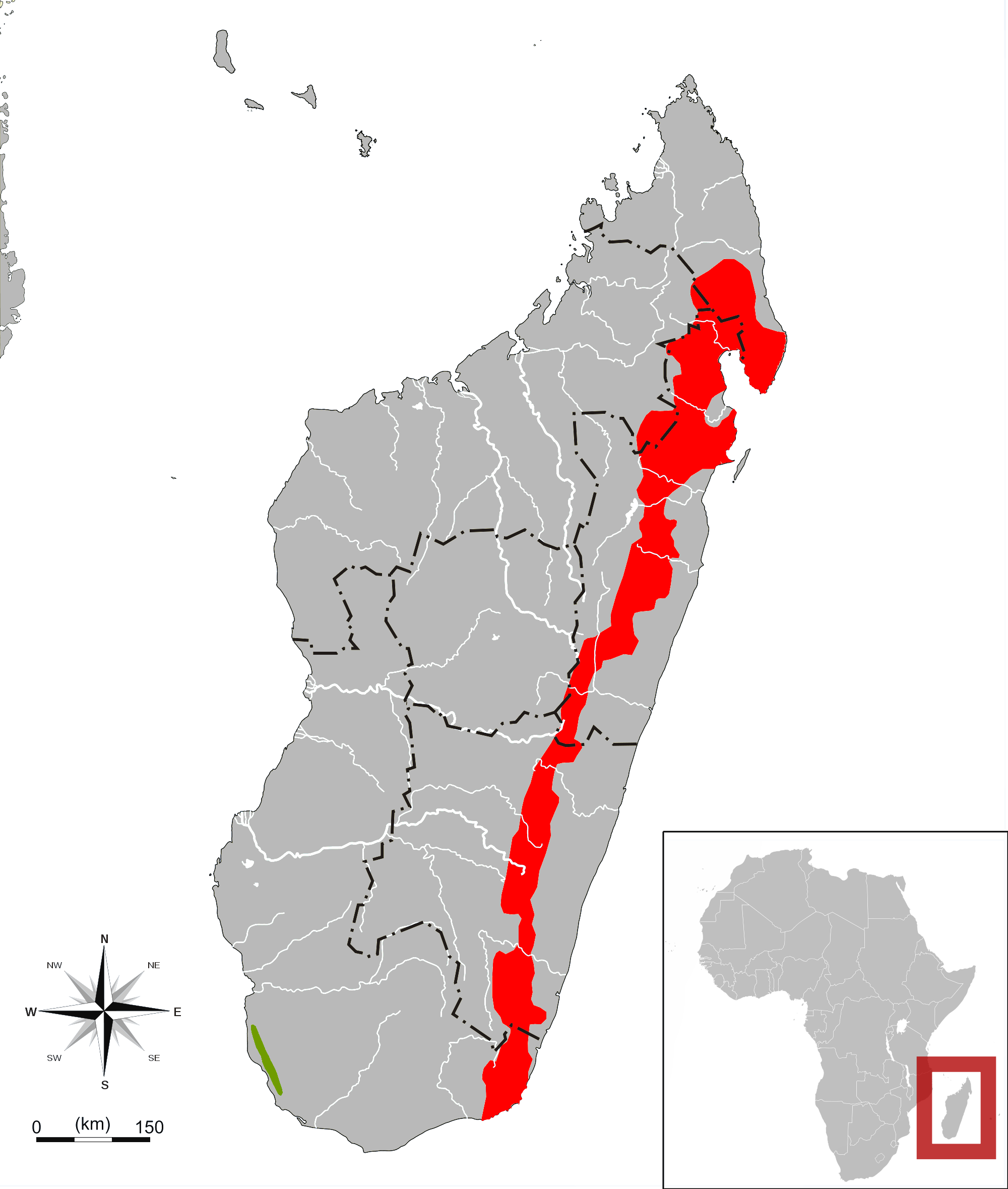
- Galidictis ranges

= Galidictis =

Genus of carnivores

Galidictis is a genus in the subfamily Galidiinae of the family Eupleridae: a group of carnivorans that are endemic to Madagascar.

The name is from two ancient Greek words that both approximately mean ‘weasel’: galid- (see Galidia) and iktis. Compare the word Galictis (grison, a closer relative of the weasel).

It contains the following two species and two subspecies:

Image	Scientific name	Subspecies	Common name	Distribution
	Galidictis fasciata	Galidictis fasciata fasciata; Galidictis fasciata striatus	Broad-striped Malagasy mongoose	Madagascar
	Galidictis grandidieri		Grandidier's mongoose	Madagascar
