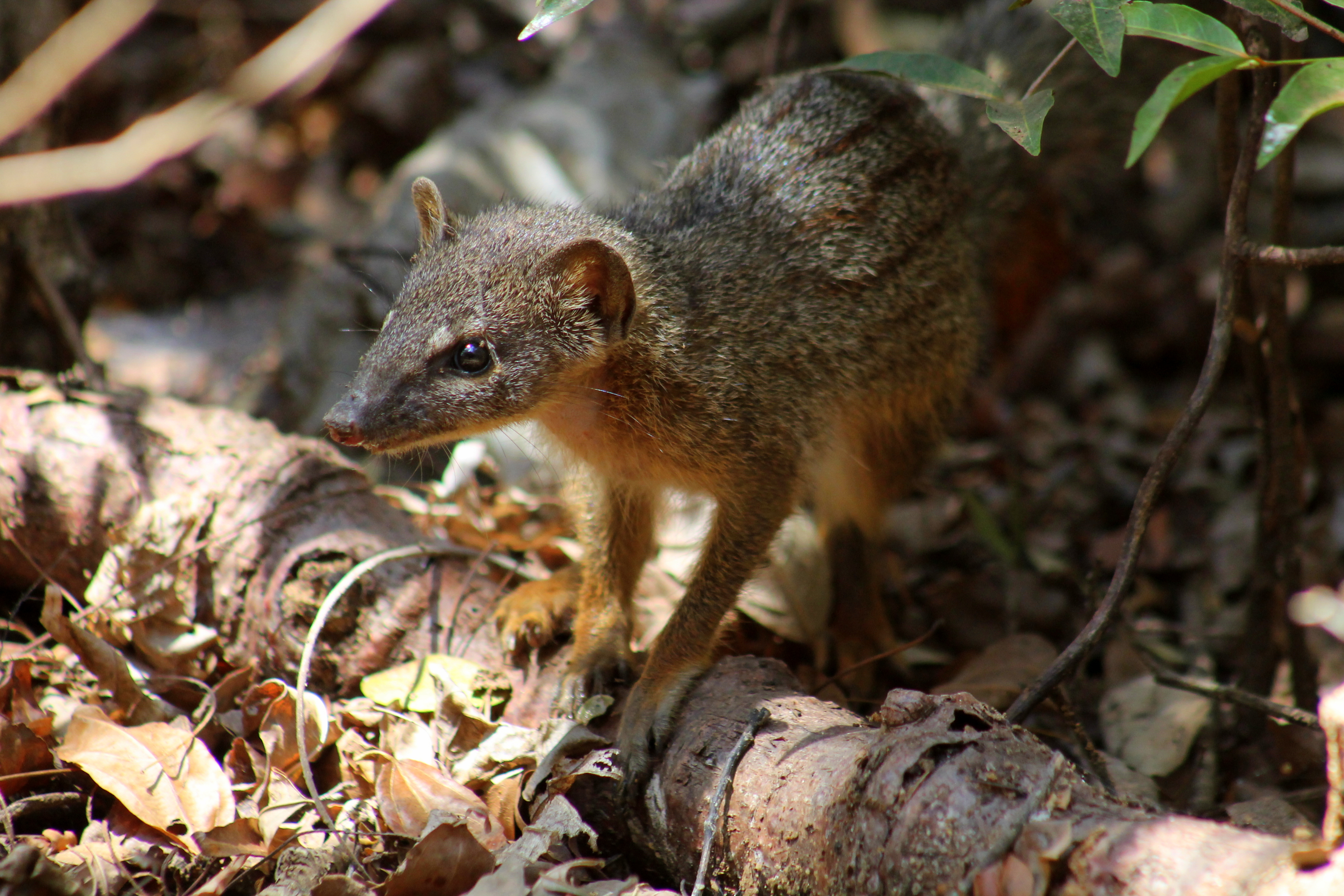

Conservation status
- Endangered (IUCN 3.1)

Scientific classification
- Kingdom: Animalia
- Phylum: Chordata
- Class: Mammalia
- Order: Carnivora
- Family: Eupleridae
- Subfamily: Galidiinae
- Genus: Mungotictis; Pocock, 1915
- Species: M. decemlineata

Binomial name
- Mungotictis decemlineata (A. Grandidier, 1867)
- Narrow-striped mongoose range

= Narrow-striped mongoose =

Species of carnivore

The narrow-striped mongoose (Mungotictis decemlineata), also known as the boky-boky in Malagasy, is a member of the family Eupleridae endemic to Madagascar. It inhabits the western Madagascar succulent woodlands and northern Madagascar spiny thickets in western and southwestern Madagascar, where it lives from sea level to about 125 m (410 ft) between the Tsiribihina and Mangoky Rivers. It is the only species in genus Mungotictis.

== Taxonomy ==
Galidia decemlineata was the scientific name used by Alfred Grandidier in 1867 for a mongoose collected on the west coast of Madagascar. It was placed in the genus Mungotictis by Reginald Innes Pocock in 1915.

=== Phylogeny ===
The narrow-striped mongoose is part of the Malagasy carnivore family Eupleridae that forms a monophyletic clade. It shares a common ancestor with sister clades of the Feliformia.

== Behaviour and ecology ==
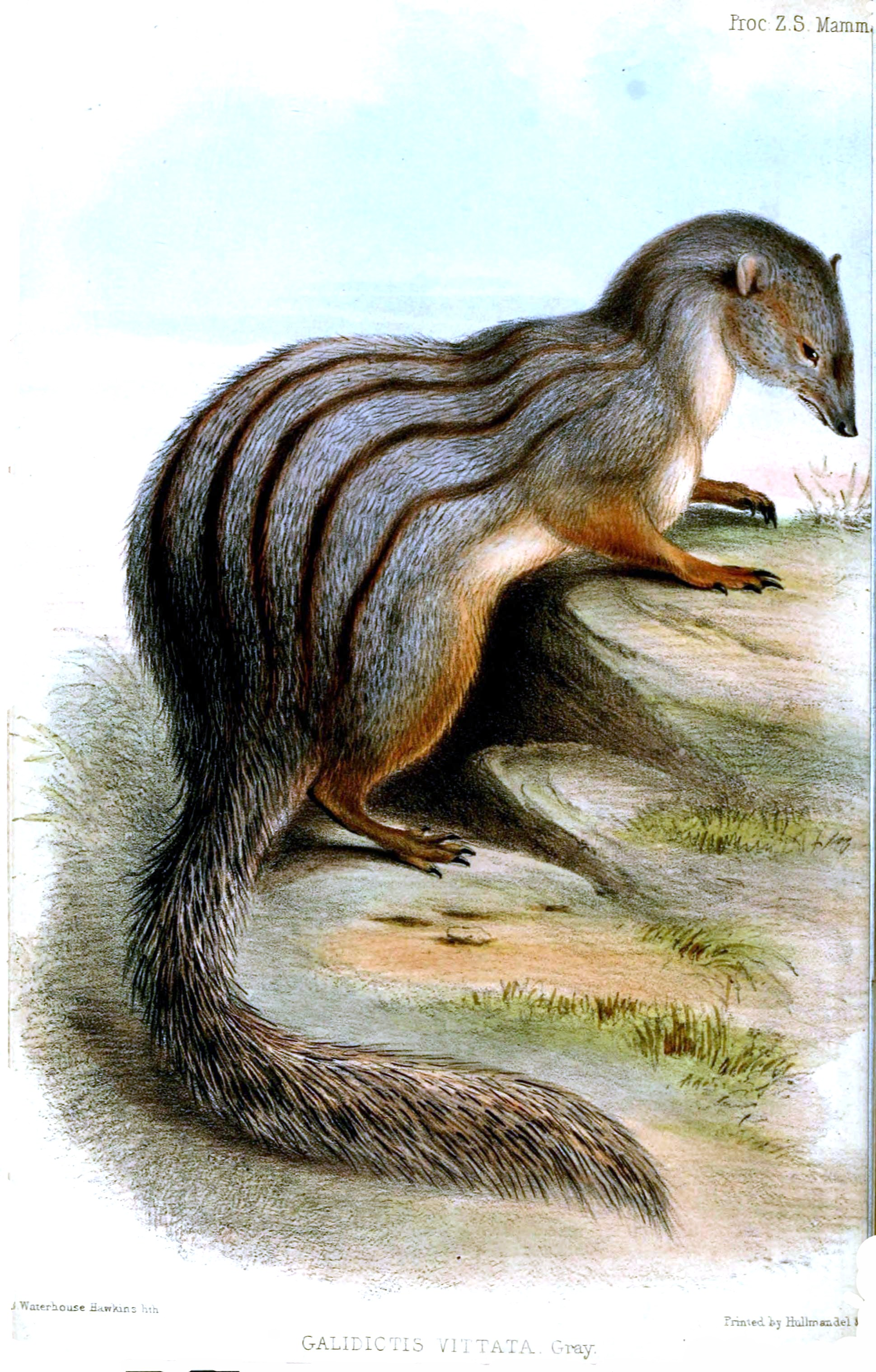
Illustration of the narrow-striped mongoose, 1848

The narrow-striped mongoose is diurnal and lives in matriarchal family groups that practice cooperative rearing of young. Usually, the young of the alpha female will get the most care, and often the lower ranking females' young is neglected to the point of abandonment.

The narrow-striped mongoose demonstrates two unique social behaviours. Females form home ranges in their habitat, where 1-3 females form a stable social unit with their offspring. Males also form their own social units with 2-4 adult males. The male units have a large home range, which often overlap with at least 3 female social units, where mates find one another.

The narrow-striped mongoose creates small nests in trees and brush, and has been known to share trees with Lepilemur species, with which it apparently has little or no interaction. Results of a few studies suggest that the narrow-striped mongoose is primarily insectivorous, but eats also bird eggs and a variety of small animals including rodents, birds, snakes, and even small lemur species such as the gray mouse lemur.

=== Reproduction ===
Males often mate with more than one female and are considered polygamous. Females may also mate with more than one male. Narrow-striped mongooses of neighbouring units are closely related, with females more closely related than males, most likely because females disperse in a smaller area. Females give birth to one offspring per season, which is usually born at the end of the dry season between October and December.

If the cub dies, they give birth to another one by February or March. Many offspring do not survive. There is about a 28% success rate of young surviving, and it is often the oldest offspring of the most dominant female that will prevail. The gestation period lasts 74–106 days.

=== Feeding habits ===
The narrow-striped mongoose forages in top soil, ground litter and rotten wood from fallen trees. A study in the Kirindy Forest revealed that its diet consists foremost of invertebrates. It feeds on arthropods, insect larvae, gastropods. Remains of reptile eggs, bones and feathers were also found in scat collected.

Air-dried scat was used to determine preferences in the diet of the narrow-striped mongoose. Evidence showed that its diet included reptile egg membrane, bones, feathers and fragments of arthropods. Invertebrates were its main source of food during the dry season of May to August and the wet season of January to March in the Kirindy Forest. The Jaccard index was used to determine which prey items and arthropods it preferred to eat during each season of the year. The results indicated that it consumes any food that was available; it was not selective towards any particular prey item. Insect larva was a main part of its diet. It forages in top soil, ground litter, and rotten wood from fallen trees, which shows how insect larvae could be considered a staple part of its diet. Gastropoda were also found as a main source of food during rainy seasons.

== Conservation ==
The narrow-striped mongoose is currently classified as Endangered on the IUCN Red List because it occurs in a severely fragmented area and is threatened by habitat loss due to logging and conversion to agriculturally used land.
