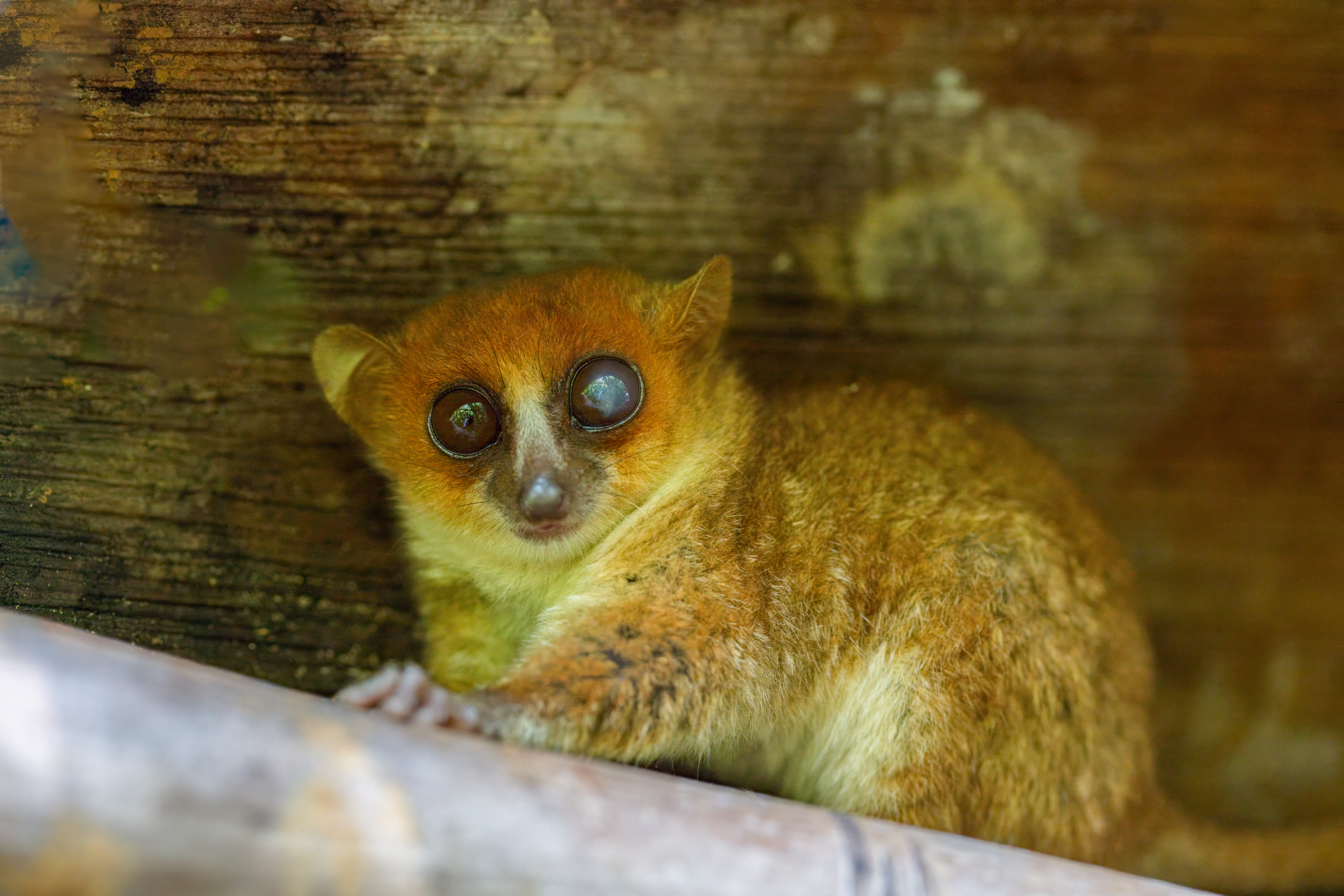

Conservation status
- Least Concern (IUCN 3.1)
- CITES Appendix I

Scientific classification
- Kingdom: Animalia
- Phylum: Chordata
- Class: Mammalia
- Order: Primates
- Suborder: Strepsirrhini
- Family: Cheirogaleidae
- Genus: Microcebus
- Species: M. murinus

Binomial name
- Microcebus murinus (Miller, 1777)
- Distribution of Microcebus murinus

Synonyms
- Chirogalus gliroides A. Grandidier, 1868; Galago madagascarensis É. Geoffroy, 1812; Prosimia minima Boddaert, 1785; Cheirogaleus minor Gray, 1842; Myocebus palmarum Lesson, 1840; Lemur prehensilis Kerr, 1792; Lemur pusillus É. Geoffroy, 1795

= Gray mouse lemur =

Grey mouse lemur

Small primate from Madagascar

The gray mouse lemur (Microcebus murinus), grey mouse lemur or lesser mouse lemur is a small lemur, a type of strepsirrhine primate, found only on the island of Madagascar. Weighing 58 to 67 grams (2.0 to 2.4 oz), it is the largest of the mouse lemurs (genus Microcebus), a group that includes the smallest primates in the world. The species is named for its mouse-like size and coloration and is known locally (in Malagasy) as tsidy, koitsiky, titilivaha, pondiky, and vakiandry. The gray mouse lemur and all other mouse lemurs are considered cryptic species, as they are nearly indistinguishable from each other by appearance. For this reason, the gray mouse lemur was considered the only mouse lemur species for decades until more recent studies began to distinguish between the species.

Like all mouse lemurs, this species is nocturnal and arboreal. It is very active, and though it forages alone, groups of males and females form sleeping groups and share tree holes during the day. It exhibits a form of dormancy called torpor during the cool, dry winter months, and in some cases undergoes seasonal torpor (or hibernation), which is unusual for primates. The gray mouse lemur can be found in several types of forest throughout western and southern Madagascar. Its diet consists primarily of fruit, insects, flowers, and nectar. In the wild, its natural predators include owls, snakes, and endemic mammalian predators. Predation pressure is higher for this species than among any other primate species, with one out of four individuals taken by a predator each year. This is counterbalanced by its high reproductive rate. Breeding is seasonal, and distinct vocalizations are used to prevent hybridization with species that overlap its range. Gestation lasts approximately 60 days, and typically two young are born. The offspring are usually independent in two months, and can reproduce after one year. The gray mouse lemur has a reproductive lifespan of five years, although captive individuals have been reported to live up to 15 years.

Although threatened by deforestation, habitat degradation, and live capture for the pet trade, it is considered one of Madagascar's most abundant small native mammals. It can tolerate moderate food shortages by experiencing daily torpor to conserve energy, but extended food shortages due to climate change may pose a significant risk to the species.

== Etymology ==
The gray or lesser mouse lemur is named for its brownish-gray fur and mouse-like size and appearance. The genus name, Microcebus, derives from the Greek words mikros, meaning "small", and kebos, meaning "monkey". The Latin version of kebos, cebus, is a common suffix used for primate names, despite the fact that the gray mouse lemur is a lemur, and not a monkey. The species name, murinus, means "mouse-like" and derives from the Latin word mus, or "mouse", and the Latin suffix -inus, which means "like".

The lemur is known locally by several names in Malagasy, depending upon the region. Around Tôlanaro (Fort Dauphin), it is called pondiky [punˈdikʲ]. In the northern end of its range, it is known as tsidy [ˈtʃidʲ]. Around Morondava, it is referred to as koitsiky [kuiˈtʃikʲ], titilivaha [ti̥tiliˈva], and vakiandry [vakiˈaɳɖʐʲ]. In many cases, these Malagasy names are also used for other visually indistinguishable mouse lemur species that live within its range.

== Taxonomy ==
As its name implies, the gray mouse lemur is a lemur, a type of primate, and belongs to the suborder Strepsirrhini and infraorder Lemuriformes. Within Lemuriformes, it belongs to the family Cheirogaleidae, which contains the mouse lemurs, dwarf lemurs, giant mouse lemurs, fork-marked lemurs, and hairy-eared dwarf lemur. The mouse lemur genus Microcebus includes the smallest primates in the world. Phylogenetic analyses of D-loop DNA sequences of various lemur species suggest that the gray mouse lemur may be most closely related to the reddish-gray mouse lemur (M. griseorufus).

In 1777, the English illustrator John Frederick Miller included a hand-coloured plate of the gray mouse lemur in his Icones animalium et plantarum and coined the binomial name Lemur murinus. The species was moved to the genus Microcebus by the French naturalist Étienne Geoffroy Saint-Hilaire in 1834. M. murinus remained the only species of its genus, as well as the name used for all mouse lemurs on Madagascar, between the first major taxonomic revision in 1931 and an extensive field study conducted in 1972. The field study distinguished the brown mouse lemur, M. rufus—then considered a subspecies—as a distinct, sympatric species in the southeastern part of the island. Upon this revision, the gray mouse lemur was thought to account for all mouse lemurs that lived in the drier parts of the north, west, and south, while the brown mouse lemur represented the eastern rainforest mouse lemurs. More recently, scientific understanding of the distribution and diversity of the mouse lemurs has become much more complex. Additional field studies, genetic testing, and resulting taxonomic revisions throughout the 1990s and 2000s identified numerous new mouse lemur species, demonstrating that the genus includes at least 17 cryptic species.

== Anatomy and physiology ==
Size comparison of a gray mouse lemur to a human.

The gray mouse lemur shares many traits with other mouse lemurs, including soft fur, a long tail, long hind limbs, a dorsal stripe down the back (not always distinct), a short snout, rounded skull, prominent eyes, and large, membranous, protruding ears. It has large eyes and a tapetum lucidum to enhance its vision at night. The dorsal coat is brownish-gray with various reddish tones, the flanks are light gray to beige, and the ventral fur has discrete dull beige or whitish-beige patches along portions of the belly. On the rounded face, there is a pale white patch above the nose and between the eyes; some individuals have dark orbital markings. The furred portions of the hands and feet are off-white.

The gray mouse lemur is one of the smallest primates in the world, yet it is also the largest mouse lemur. Its total length is 25 to 28 cm (9.8 to 11.0 in), with a head-body length of 12 to 14 cm (4.7 to 5.5 in) and a tail length of 13 to 14.5 cm (5.1 to 5.7 in). The average weight for this species is 60 g (2.1 oz), with ranges of 58 and 67 g (2.0 and 2.4 oz) and 40 and 70 g (1.4 and 2.5 oz) reported. This is smaller than the world's smallest monkey, the pygmy marmoset, which ranges between 85 and 140 g (3.0 and 4.9 oz). Weight varies by season, with both sexes building fat reserves, up to 35% of their body weight, in the tail and hind legs prior to the dry season and periods of dormancy. The tail of the gray mouse lemur can increase fourfold in volume during the wet season when it is storing fat. Even in captivity when environmental limitations are not an issue, mouse lemurs have shown a seasonal dietary preference with a greater protein intake during what would be their more active season.

Bleyer et al. (2024) identified spontaneous soft tissue tumors in captive M. murinus, occurring mostly in old and senile animals and located primarily on the trunk, and at lower frequencies on the head and at visceral sites. The majority of soft tissue tumors were identified as being of fibrous origin, followed by undifferentiated sarcomas and extraskeletal chondro-osseous neoplasms. Female mouse lemurs were found to be more frequently affected by grade II and grade III tumors compared to males (according to the FNCLCC system), though authors cautioned that links to hormonal or genetic causes are speculative. Sampling of M. murinus lymphoproliferative lesions revealed the novel cheirogaleid betaherpesvirus 1 and cheirogaleid gammaherpesvirus 2. While gammaherpesviruses are linked to lymphoproliferative disorders in humans and other simians, no such conclusion could be definitively drawn in mouse lemurs.

Researchers have identified differences in the tooth morphology of the first and second molars between the gray mouse lemur and the reddish-gray mouse lemur. In the reddish-gray mouse lemur, the first lower molar (m1) is squared and both the first and second upper molars (M1 and M2) have slight indentations around the middle of the posterior margin. The gray mouse lemur has a more elongated m1 and lacks the aforementioned indentation on M1 and M2. In terms of its general dentition, the gray mouse lemur shares the same dental formula as all other members of its family, Cheirogaleidae: 2.1.3.32.1.3.3 × 2 = 36.

This species has 66 chromosomes, closely resembling the karyotype of the dwarf lemurs (genus Cheirogaleus). Except for the X chromosome, all chromosomes are acrocentric (with the short arm absent or virtually absent). Its genome size is 3.12 picograms (pg).

== Ecology ==
Like all other members of the family Cheirogaleidae, the gray mouse lemur is nocturnal and arboreal. It inhabits lowland tropical dry forest, sub-arid thorn scrub, gallery forest, spiny forest, eastern littoral forest, dry deciduous forests, semi-humid deciduous, moist lowland forest, transitional forest, and secondary forests or degraded forests (including plantations) all ranging up to 800 m (2,600 ft) above sea level. The species is more common in secondary forest than in primary forest, particularly bush and scrub habitat, where it occupies a "fine branch" niche, restricting the vertical range to fine branches, fine terminal supports, lianas and dense foliage. These lemurs are usually seen on branches less than 5 cm (2.0 in) in diameter. The gray mouse lemur tends to prefer lower levels of the forest and the understory, where branches and vegetation are dense.

In secondary forest, it is generally observed from ground level up to 10 m (33 ft) above ground, yet 15 to 30 m (50 to 100 ft) in the canopy of primary forest. Studies have found that the species can spend as much as 40% of its time below 3 m (10 ft), with 70% of its time spent at this level during the end of the dry season, when plant food is limited and insects compose a larger percentage of the diet. The species is more numerous in spiny forest, such as the Andohahela Special Reserve, than in the gallery forest, preferring drier, littoral forest, whereas the brown mouse lemur prefers inland rain forest.

The limits of the distribution are poorly understood. It is believed to range from the Onilahy River or Lake Tsimanampetsotsa in the south to Ankarafantsika National Park in the north. There is also an isolated and disjointed population in the southeastern part of the island, near Tôlanaro and the Andohahela National Park, up to the Mandena Conservation Zone. Individuals tend to occupy small home ranges of 1 to 2 ha (2.5 to 4.9 acres). The gray mouse lemur is also sympatric with the reddish-gray mouse lemur, golden-brown mouse lemur, Madame Berthe's mouse lemur, and several other cheirogaleid lemurs. In Ankarafantsika National Park, where it coexists with the golden-brown mouse lemur, the gray mouse lemur's relative population density was highest at higher altitudes and in drier habitat, while the golden-brown mouse lemur preferred the opposite. Another study has looked at the coexistence of the gray mouse lemur and Madame Berthe's mouse lemur and found small, exclusive clusters of each species and a high degree of feeding niche overlap.

The gray mouse lemur can reach high population densities up to several hundred individuals per square kilometer (up to 167 individuals/km^{2} at Ankarafantsika National Park to 712 individuals/km^{2} at Kirindy Mitea National Park). This abundance is not uniform and tends to concentrate in "population nuclei", suggesting that it is difficult to accurately estimate population densities when extrapolating from a small area (from various studies) to a large area. The difficulty in finding individuals during some times of the year, particularly during the dry periods, can further complicate the problem of estimating population densities.

Mouse lemurs are omnivorous, and favor fruit and insects for the bulk of their diet. The gray mouse lemur may even come down to the ground to catch insect prey, though it quickly returns to the protective cover of the understory to consume its catch. Nectar is also a part of the gray mouse lemur's diet, making it a potential pollinator for local plant species. A single instance of a male cannibalizing an adult female is known.

=== Predation ===
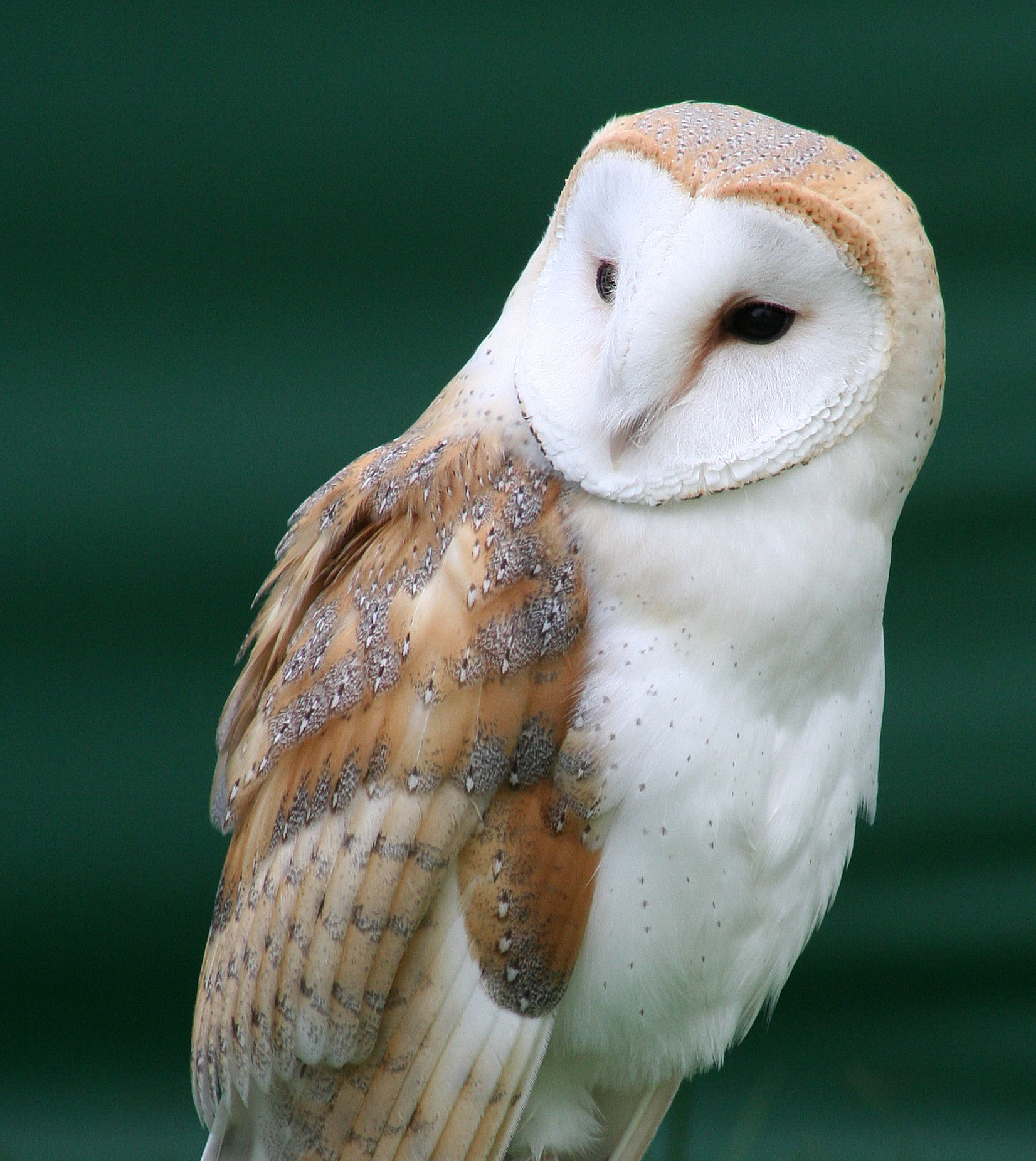

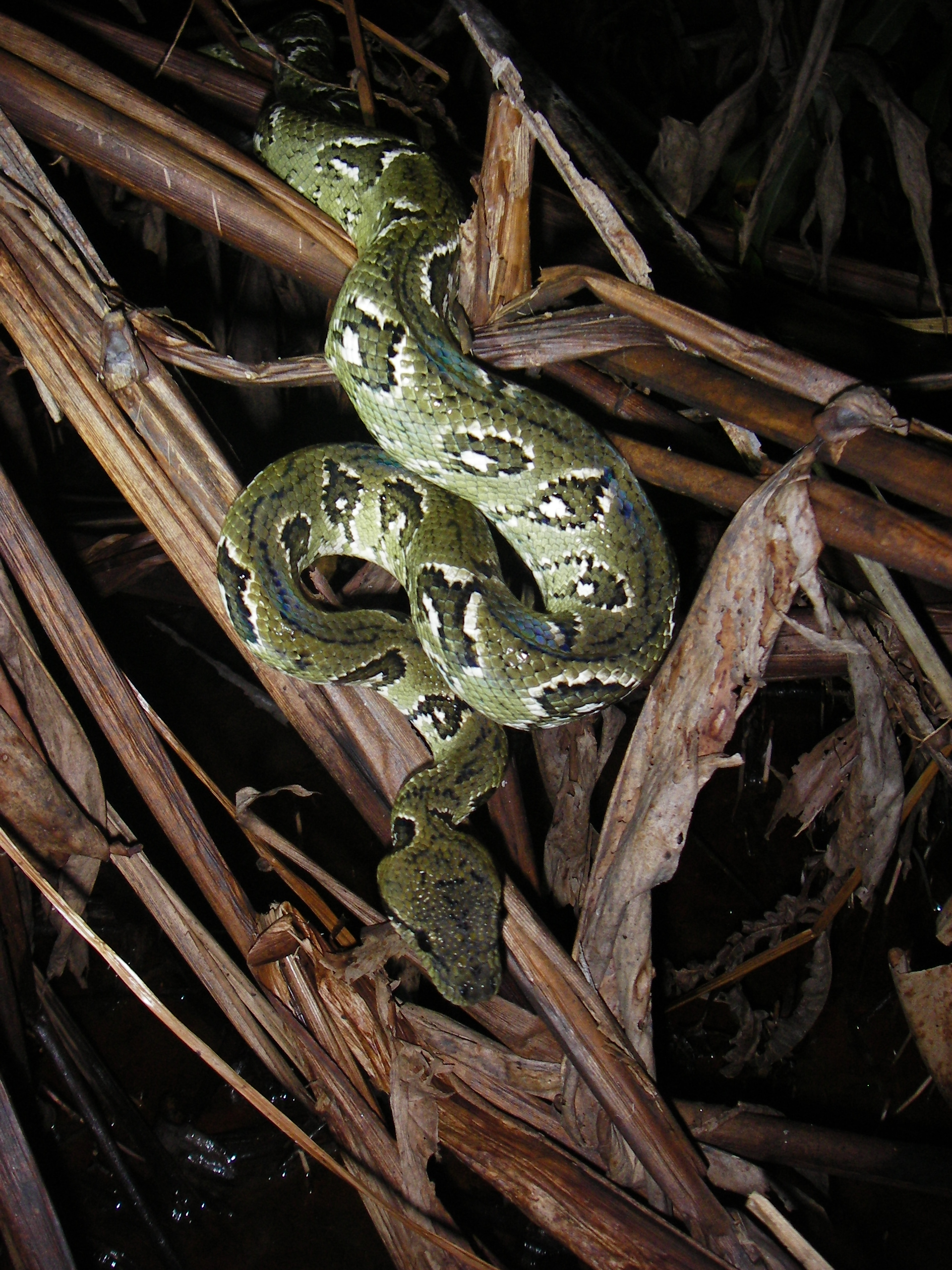
The barn owl, Tyto alba, (above) and the Madagascar tree boa, Sanzinia madagascariensis, (below) are major predators of the gray mouse lemur.

The most significant predators of the gray mouse lemur are the Madagascar owl and barn owl. Studies conducted in Beza Mahafaly Reserve and Kirindy Mitea National Park indicate a predation rate of around 25% (percent population taken by predators per year), the highest known for any primate species. However, given the species' high reproductive potential, predation does not appear to have a drastic effect on its populations. Other raptors, such as Henst's goshawk and other owls, also prey upon this species. Snakes, such as Ithycyphus miniatus (a native colubrid snake) and the Madagascar tree boa, as well as mammalian predators, such as the ring-tailed mongoose, narrow-striped mongoose, fossa, and domestic dogs are also known to prey on the gray mouse lemur. Mammalian predators often discover tree holes serving as nests, and enlarge the opening so they can catch and eat the occupant. This puts strong selective pressure on the choice of nest hole opening diameter and deepness.

Due to its non-gregarious nature, the gray mouse lemur, like other nocturnal lemurs, primarily defends itself from predators using avoidance strategies, although group defense through the use of alarm calls and predator mobbing has been observed in this species. Studies involving the placement of predator and non-predator fecal odor with captive populations have demonstrated a genetic predisposition for predator recognition through the detection of metabolites from meat digestion. The mouse lemurs were shown to avoid locations where they typically received rewards, as well as exhibit increased activity and anti-predator behavior, when the odor of predator feces were present in that vicinity, but not when the fecal odor of Malagasy non-predators was present.

During the day, when they are most vulnerable, individuals shelter inside tree holes, sometimes forming nests. They may use three to nine different tree holes within their home range, yet individuals may use one particular hole for up to five consecutive days. Mouse lemurs tend to prefer tree hollows, but also commonly make spherical constructions out of leaves. Nests are usually found in tree holes with a minimum diameter of 5 cm (2.0 in), with a median of 13 cm (5.1 in), suggesting that this range in diameter of tree holes may be crucial for maintaining a healthy habitat. The gray mouse lemur also spends most of its time in dense vegetation, limiting its visibility and accessibility to predators. Furthermore, it has a high reproductive rate to counter losses to predation.

== Behavior ==
The gray mouse lemur is nocturnal, sleeping during the day in tree holes lined with leaf litter or purpose-built spherical nests constructed from dead leaves, moss and twigs. It usually forages alone at night, but may sleep in groups during the day, the composition of which depends on gender and season. Tree holes can be shared with up to 15 other individuals, although males tend to sleep alone while females tend to share nests.

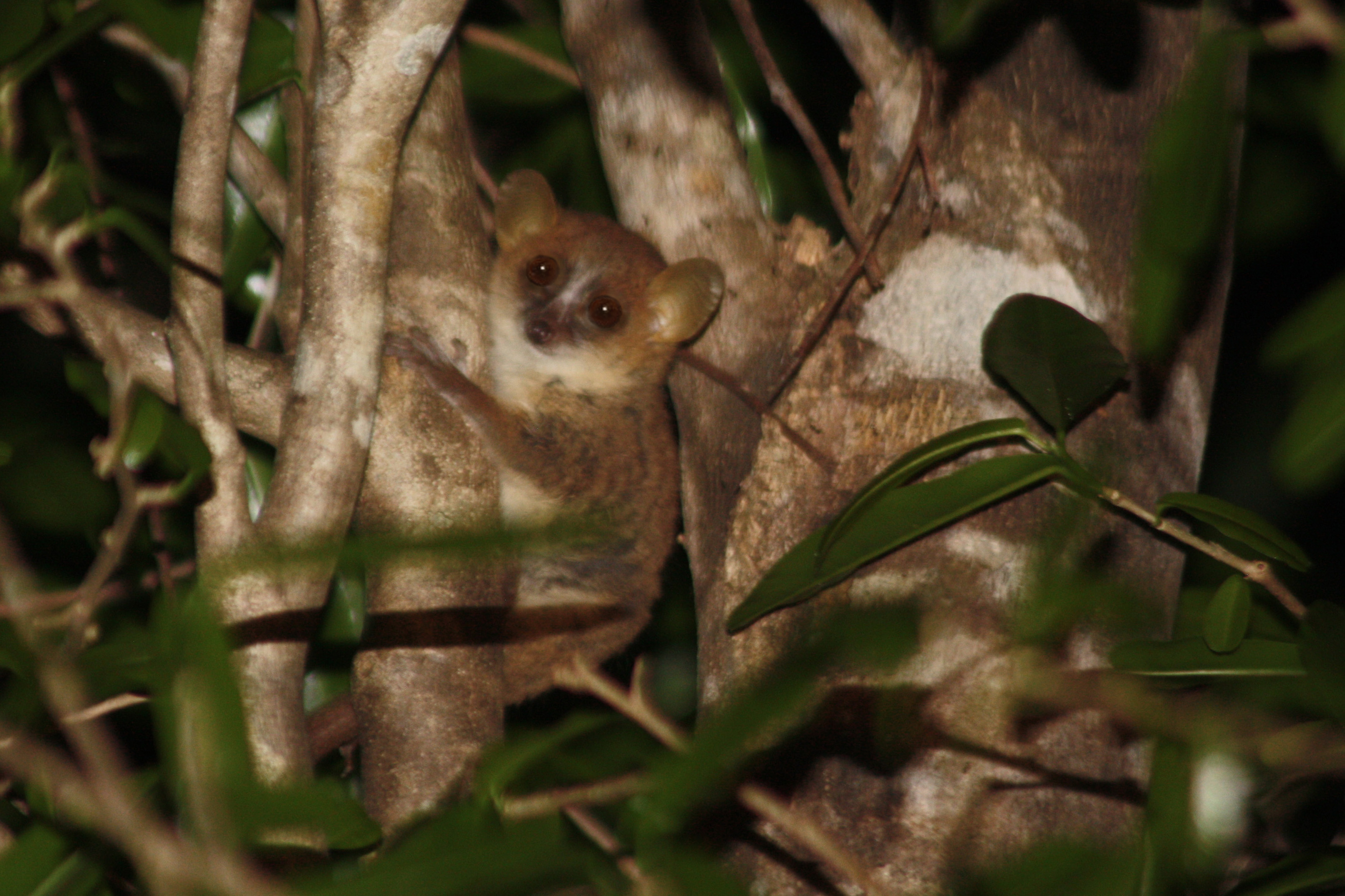
Grey mouse lemur at night in the Anjajavy Forest

All mouse lemurs are highly active at night, often scurrying like mice and leaping over 3 m (9.8 ft), using the tail as a balancing organ. When moving among the terminal branches of bushes and trees, they grip using all four feet and move with four legs. When on the ground, either to catch insects or cross short open areas, mouse lemurs hop like a frog. When hunting, the grey mouse lemur is known to catch invertebrates and small vertebrates with quick hand grasps.

In the dry season, the gray mouse lemur faces the challenge of exploiting sparsely distributed feeding resources efficiently. Results of a recent study on this showed that the gray mouse lemur does not move around randomly, but rather use spatial cues to find food resources in the absence of sensory cues, and that they seem to reuse common, highly efficient routes with regard to travel distance. It is believed that rather than using a route-based network, the gray mouse lemur has some sense of mental representation of their spatial environment, which they use to find and exploit food resources.

Foraging behavior is often slow, with height and direction changing continuously. Predation of insects occurs primarily on the ground. Before descending, the ear pinnae move alternately to help pinpoint the precise location of their prey. Insects are captured during a rapid dash across the leaf litter and are transported by mouth up into the relative safety of the branches. Studies with captive gray mouse lemurs have shown that vision is primarily used for prey detection, although the other senses certainly play a role in foraging.

The gray mouse lemur is omnivorous, feeding primarily on fruit and invertebrates. Local populations appear to specialize on locally available fruit. At both Marosalaza and Mandena, beetles are the primary insect prey, although moths, praying mantids, fulgorid bugs, crickets, cockroaches, and spiders are also eaten. Less than half the diet consists of insects, with fruit making up a slightly larger fraction. This lemur also consumes flowers, gums and nectar from Euphorbia and Terminalia trees, leaves (Uapaca sp.), exudates (Homopteran larvae secretions), and small vertebrates such as tree frogs, geckos, and chameleons. Its diet is seasonally varied and diverse in content, giving it a very broad feeding niche compared to other species such as the Madame Berthe's mouse lemur. Therefore, it is affected more by food availability than by niche partitioning where sympatry occurs.

=== Dormancy ===
As with all members of the mouse lemur genus, the gray mouse lemur is known to enter short states of daily torpor, particularly during the cool, dry Southern Hemisphere winter. This rare trait in primates, coupled with the ease of observing the species within its wide geographic distribution and its good representation in captivity, makes it a popular subject for research as a model organism.

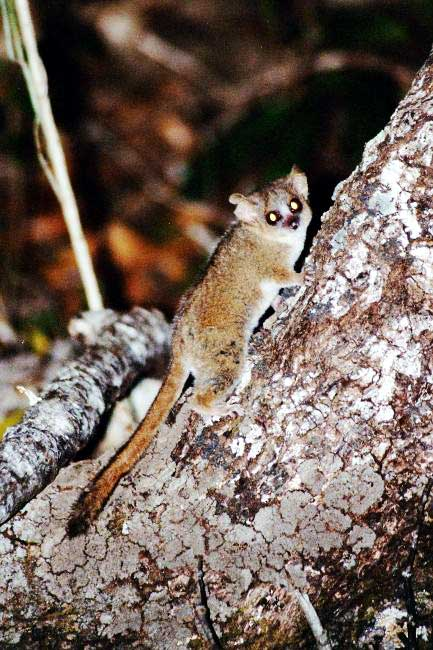
The tapetum lucidum, responsible for eyeshine, reflects light to enhance night vision.

The gray mouse lemur is unique among the mouse lemurs studied so far because it is the only species to exhibit prolonged seasonal torpor, but this behavior has only been observed to occur in one locality. Activity patterns can differ noticeably between sexes as well as populations. At the Ampijoroa Forestry Station in Ankarafantsika National Park, males and females exhibit daily, rather than seasonal torpor. At Kirindy Forest, both sexes share the same daily torpor, yet during the dry season (April/May through September/October), females become completely inactive for several weeks or up to five months to conserve energy and reduce predation. However, males rarely remain inactive for more than a few days and become extremely active before the females revive from torpor, allowing them to establish hierarchies and territories for the breeding season. The use of alternative energy-saving strategies under the same environmental conditions was observed directly in 2008, providing the first physiological confirmation from the field. This pattern of seasonal versus daily torpor may relate to the seasonality of the region, since Kirindy is the only location west of the eastern mountain rainforests that experiences very low temperatures at night during the winter months. By entering extended torpor, sometimes referred to as hibernation, this would reduce the thermoregulatory stress in females, whereas males remain more active in preparation for the upcoming mating season. No difference in mortality has been shown between hibernating females and active males.

During torpor, the gray mouse lemur's metabolic rate slows and its body temperature drops to the ambient temperature, as low as 7 °C (45 °F). During the cooler months of May though August, the species selects tree holes closer to ground level, where ambient temperatures remain more stable. This allows them to remain in torpor longer, and to conserve metabolic resources. One study showed that during the breeding season, both males and females reduced their energy expenditure by 20% when they nested in pairs, and a maximal energetic benefit of 40% was achieved when three mouse lemurs nested together. Even during the nonbreeding season, maximal energetic gain was observed two or more animals nested together, because resting metabolic rate was already decreased.

While the gray mouse lemur is found in both primary and secondary deciduous forests, they have lower population densities in secondary forests. This is because variations in gray mouse lemur abundance are linked to their capacity to enter torpor during the dry season, especially for females, which tend to hibernate longer than males. In primary forests, they can maintain daily torpor or hibernation as long as their body temperatures remain below 28 °C (82 °F), but in secondary forests that have fewer large trees, temperatures are higher and inhibit the gray mouse lemur's ability to maintain torpor for prolonged periods of time. In addition, the gray mouse lemur in secondary forests tend to have a lower body mass than those in primary forests, as well as lower survival rates. This is likely because those with lower body mass are less likely to enter torpor, and therefore expend around 40% more energy than those that do maintain torpor.

This unusual ability for a primate to exhibit dormancy, in addition to the diminutive size, has led researchers to speculate that ancestral lemurs, and possibly ancestral primates, may have shared some traits with mouse lemurs. Consequently, the gray mouse lemur has once again been used as a model organism for studying lemur and primate evolution. For example, lemurs are thought to have colonized Madagascar by rafting to the island around 60 million years ago according to molecular phylogenetic studies. Before the discovery that ocean currents were the opposite of what they are today, thus favoring such an event, it was thought that it would have taken too long for any animal not capable of entering a state of dormancy to survive the trip. Therefore, the mouse lemurs, such as the gray mouse lemur, were thought to have shared this plesiomorphic (ancestral) trait with the ancestral lemurs.

=== Social systems ===
The gray mouse lemur is described as solitary but social, foraging alone at night, but frequently sleeping in groups during the day. This social pattern varies by gender, season, and location. Females tend to share nests with other females and their offspring, whereas males tend to sleep alone or in pairs outside of the breeding season. Groups of females sharing a nest can be relatively stable, consisting of two to nine individuals, although a male may be found with a group of females outside the breeding season. During the breeding season (September through October), males and females may sleep in the same tree hole. Mixed sex groups can be common at this time, with single males sharing nest sites with three to seven females or single females sharing nest sites with one to three males.

Research has shown that home ranges for the gray mouse lemur are usually small, possibly less than 50 m (160 ft). Males typically travel further at night and have home ranges that are twice as large as those of females, often overlapping with one another, and always overlapping with at least one female's home range. Male home ranges increase threefold during the breeding season.

Female home ranges overlap less than those of males, although localized concentrations, or "population nuclei", tend to form in some areas, where the sex ratio favors females to males by three or four to one at the nucleus core. Genetic studies indicate that females arrange themselves spatially in clusters ("population nuclei") of related individuals, while males tend to emigrate from their natal group. Research has shown that females in this species may maintain smaller ranges and associate more closely with other females than in some other mouse lemur species due to a more opportunistic feeding niche and, in the case of populations at Kirindy, the use of extended, seasonal torpor.

=== Communication ===
Gray mouse lemur vocalizations
Gray mouse lemur alarm call
High-frequency, fast-paced squeaks emitted when startled

Gray mouse lemur territorial call
High-frequency, loud chirps emitted under normal conditions

Vocalizations and scent are the primarily modes of communication within this species. Home ranges are scent marked with urine and feces. Vocalizations are complex and very high-pitched (ranging from 10 to 36 kHz), sometimes beyond the range of human hearing (0.02 to 20 kHz). These include calls for seeking contact, mating, distant communication, alarm, and distress.

Like other mouse lemurs, the gray mouse lemur uses what has been described as a harmonic whistle call that is lower in frequency and shorter in duration than its close relative, the brown mouse lemur. In addition, it has been found that the types of vocalizations emitted by the gray mouse lemur can be dependent upon the environment. In the more open dry forest habitats favored by the gray mouse lemur, trill calls are more common and effective since they carry faster and are less likely to be masked by the wind, while chirp calls are more common in the brown mouse lemur, which favors closed rain forest habitats.

As with other social mammals, the calls reveal the sex and identity of the individual. Dialects have also been detected between communities. The male trill call, part of the male mating display, is much like a bird song in terms of its ordered sequence of broadband frequency modulated syllables, ranging between 13 and 35 kHz in pitch and lasting 0.3 to 0.9 seconds, repeating up to 1.5 times per minute. Each locality has its own theme of trill calls that is distinct from those of neighboring communities, and resident males produce individually distinct trill calls within that theme. These calls are not genetically programmed. During play, young males produce early attempts at the trill call, which show high degrees of variability. Research has shown that the male mouse lemurs consciously manipulate the dialect to resemble those of their neighbors, when transferred from their home to a new neighborhood. This may reduce aggression and foster social acceptance for emigrant males as they transfer from their natal group upon maturity.

Because mouse lemurs are cryptic species, and therefore visually indistinguishable, their social calls help individuals select mates of their own species. This differentiated signaling and recognition system has promoted species cohesiveness through premating isolation, and helped researchers distinguish and identify species.

=== Breeding and reproduction ===
The mating system is described as multi-male and multi-female. Males establish dominance hierarchies prior to the mating season, however, some studies in the wild have shown no male aggression or visible competition for receptive females. Males in captivity become highly aggressive and form strict dominance hierarchies. These captive males may show the highest plasma testosterone levels found in mammals, and even the odor of a dominant male can lower the testosterone levels and sexually inhibit a subordinate male. During the breeding season, male testes increase significantly in size, facilitating sperm competition due to female promiscuity. Studies with the gray mouse lemur have shown that the optimal insemination period, during which a male is most likely to sire offspring, occurs early during a female's receptivity. Only during the mating season does male mortality rise above that of female mortality.

Although the gray mouse lemur displays multi-male, multi-female mating patterns, studies have shown that females do exhibit indirect mate selection (a form of selected polyandry). During the study, females would mate with 1–7 males up to 11 times during their single night of receptivity, but would avoid or counteract males that attempted to monopolize mating. Dominant males that attempt to monopolize tend to be larger and heavier individuals. Female selection however, has been shown to help increase genetic diversity among offspring.

The gray mouse lemur is considered overall sexually monomorphic, but seasonally fluctuating sexual dimorphism in terms of body mass has been recorded. While the body mass of both sexes fluctuates over the year as a function of food availability, being highest in the rainy season, the differing behavioral repertoires of the sexes lead to sex-specific patterns in this fluctuation. For example, male body mass increases prior to the mating season due to a substantial increase in testes volume that likely enhances the males' success in sperm competition.

The females are receptive for 45 to 55 days between September and October, with estrus lasting 1 to 5 days. Females advertise estrus by distinctive high-frequency calls and scent-marking. Gestation lasts 54 to 68 days, averaging 60 days, typically resulting in 2 or 3 offspring weighing 5 g (0.18 oz) each. Infants are born in a leaf nest or tree hole in November prior to the onset of the rainy season. Weaning occurs after 25 days, and the infants are either left in the nest or carried in the mother's mouth and deposited on a branch while she forages. Infant mouse lemurs do not cling to the mother's fur. Independence is attained in 2 months, while sexual maturity is reached at 10 to 29 months in females and 7 to 19 months in males. Closely related females remain loosely associated after maturation (female philopatry), whereas males disperse from their natal area. In the wild, the gray mouse lemur's reproductive lifespan is no more than 5 years, although captive specimens have reportedly lived as long as 15 years and 5 months, or even as long as 18.2 years.

The gray mouse lemur uses cooperative breeding as a form of family insurance. The female regularly transfers her offspring to other females' nests—and likewise grooms and cares for offspring other than her own. While this can have a high physiological cost on a lactating female that is already expending a lot of energy, it can be beneficial overall to insuring survival among closely related groups with high mortality risk. A study that took place over three breeding seasons showed that closely related females form breeding groups mainly when there is a shortage of suitable roosts; when there is an advantage of a communal nest for defense, or when there are thermoregulatory benefits. In the event of offspring adoption, when a parent dies and a closely related female takes over care, it is believed that this is beneficial to groups with high mortality risk.

=== Intelligence ===
Despite limited research, some studies have found that "mouse lemurs’ performance in spatial memory assessed by object permanence, rotation, or transposition tasks was inferior to chimpanzees or olive baboons, but research in the wild where mouse lemurs had to move between an array of feeding platforms revealed that they have an excellent spatial memory and exhibited a high travel efficiency in directed movements, most likely based on mental representations that are more detailed than a route-based network map" and that its intelligence is on par with Hominidae, this could be down to mouse lemurs with higher cognitive abilities living longer. Despite this, a scientific study found no evidence of self-awareness when using a Mirror test.

== Conservation status ==
The gray mouse lemur was listed in Appendix 1 by the Convention on International Trade in Endangered Species (CITES) in 1975, declaring it as threatened with extinction and prohibiting international trade of specimens except for non-commercial use, such as scientific research. The 2008 International Union for Conservation of Nature (IUCN) Red List assessment lists it as a species of least concern (LC) with a decreasing population trend.

Its greatest threats are habitat loss from slash-and-burn agriculture and cattle-grazing, as well as live capture for the local pet trade in the northern and southern parts of its range. Although this species inhabits secondary forests, studies have shown that decreased habitat quality adversely affects its populations since fewer tree holes offer fewer opportunities to conserve energy, increasing stress and mortality. One study found nine species of parasites in the fecal matter of the gray mouse lemur living in forests that suffered degradation and fragmentation. In small fragments of good quality forest, as well as forests with high levels of degradation, the gray mouse lemur showed a higher prevalence of parasitic nematodes and protozoans than those in larger good quality forest fragments. Studies in the late 1960s and 1970s showed that heavy logging between 1968 and 1970 seemed to result in decreased body weight, the use of smaller trees for nesting sites, and a smaller maximum female nesting group size (down to 7 from 15). There is also a concern that although daily torpor can help conserve energy and resources during moderate food shortages, extended food shortages brought about by climate change could create too much stress and severely impact the survivability of the species.

The gray mouse lemur is considered one of Madagascar's most abundant small native mammals, found in seven national parks, five special reserves, the Berenty Private Reserve, and other privately protected forests within the Mandena Conservation Zone.

This species of mouse lemur breeds very well in captivity, although it is not commonly displayed in zoos like some larger, diurnal lemurs. In 1989, more than 370 individuals were housed by 14 International Species Information System (ISIS) and non-ISIS institutions across the United States and Europe, 97% of which were captive born. In March 2009, 167 were registered at 29 ISIS institutions, including the Duke Lemur Center.
