= Madagascar succulent woodlands =

Ecoregion in Madagascar

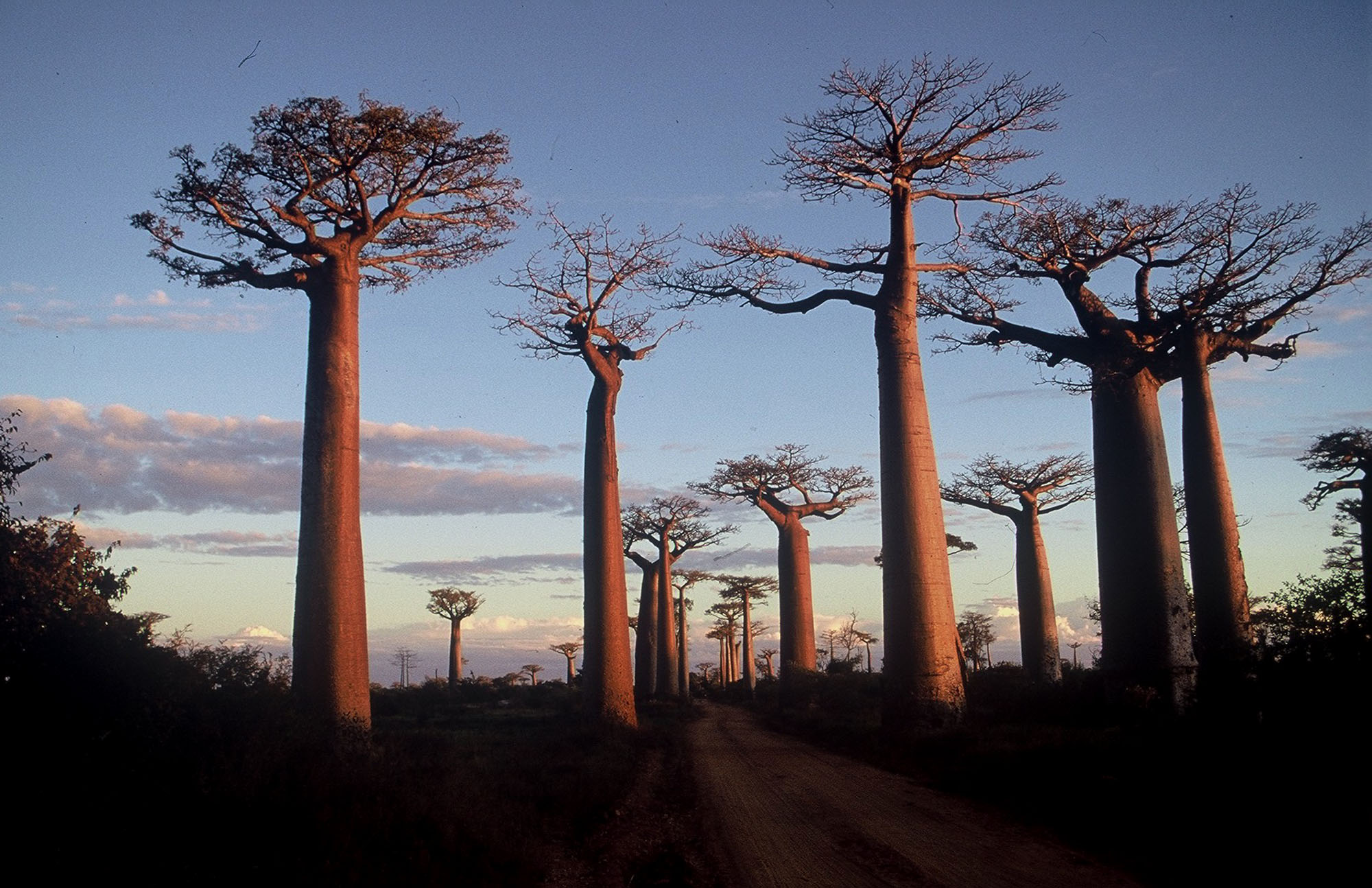
- Avenue of the Baobabs near Morondava

Ecology
- Realm: Afrotropical
- Biome: Deserts and xeric shrublands
- Borders: Madagascar dry deciduous forests; Madagascar subhumid forests; Madagascar spiny forests
- Animals: Standing's day gecko, flat-backed spider tortoise
- Bird species: Appert's greenbul
- Mammal species: Malagasy giant rat, Madame Berthe's mouse lemur, Verreaux's sifaka, narrow-striped mongoose

Geography
- Area: 79,700 km^{2} (30,800 mi^{2})
- Country: Madagascar
- Elevation: 0–600 metres (0–1,969 ft)
- Coordinates: 22°36′S 44°36′E
- Geology: Sands, sandstone, limestone, metamorphic, and igneous basement rocks
- Climate type: Hot semi-arid climate (BSh)
- Soil types: Sandy

Conservation
- Conservation status: Critical, endangered
- Protected: 4.63%

The Madagascar succulent woodlands are a xeric shrublands ecoregion in southwestern and central western Madagascar. Native plants survive in the arid climate and long dry season with adaptations like succulent leaves, water storing trunks, photosynthetic stems, and dropping leaves during the dry season. The ecoregion is threatened by various human activities.

== Geography ==
The succulent woodlands are found in the southwest and centre-west of Madagascar, in the rain shadow region that receives less moisture than the east and the Central Highlands. The climate is tropical and dry, with rainfall ranging from 575 to 1,330 mm per year, and a marked dry season from May to October.

To the north, the succulent woodlands make a transition into the Madagascar dry deciduous forests, while to the south they border the even drier Madagascar spiny thickets, and to the east the Madagascar subhumid forests. They are bounded on the west by the Mozambique Channel.

== Flora ==
The vegetation is similar to the dry deciduous forests to the north, but includes more dry-adapted, xerophytic species. Forests and open-canopied woodlands, reaching 15 metres (49 ft) in height, contain trees and shrubs of the families Burseraceae, Euphorbiaceae, Fabaceae, and Sapindaceae. Notable endemic and near-endemic plants include two species of baobab, Adansonia za and A. grandidieri (near threatened and endangered, respectively), the endemic tree hazomalany (Hazomalania voyronii), and succulents in the genus Pachypodium.

== Fauna ==
Between 60 and 90 bird species and eight lemur species are found in the ecoregion and a number of mammals, frogs, and reptiles are endemic to the area.

Native mammals include the red-tailed sportive lemur (Lepilemur ruficaudatus), large-eared tenrec (Geogale aurita), lesser hedgehog tenrec (Echinops telfairi), and Verreaux's sifaka (Propithecus verreauxi verreauxi). Endemic mammals include the narrow-striped mongoose (Mungotictis decemlineata), Malagasy giant rat (Hypogeomys antimena), and endangered Madame Berthe's mouse lemur (Microcebus berthae), the world's smallest primate.

Native limited-range birds include the red-capped coua (Coua ruficeps), Appert's greenbul (Xanthomixis apperti), white-breasted mesite (Mesitornis variegatus), and long-tailed ground roller (Uratelorinis chimaera).

== Threats and conservation ==
The Madagascar succulent woodlands are threatened by burning, logging (which impacts species such as the endemic tree Hazomalania voyronii), cattle and goat farming, and hunting of several mammals.

4.63% of the ecoregion is in protected areas. Protected areas include Zombitse-Vohibasia National Park, Kirindy Mitea National Park, Andranomena Special Reserve, and Beza Mahafaly Special Reserve.

The Menabe Antimena protected area, located in the west of the ecoregion, includes the northern portion of the Kirindy Forest. Large areas have been illegally logged, burned, and converted to maize fields, which threatens the area's wildlife, including Madame Berthe's mouse lemur.

== See also ==
- Ecoregions of Madagascar
