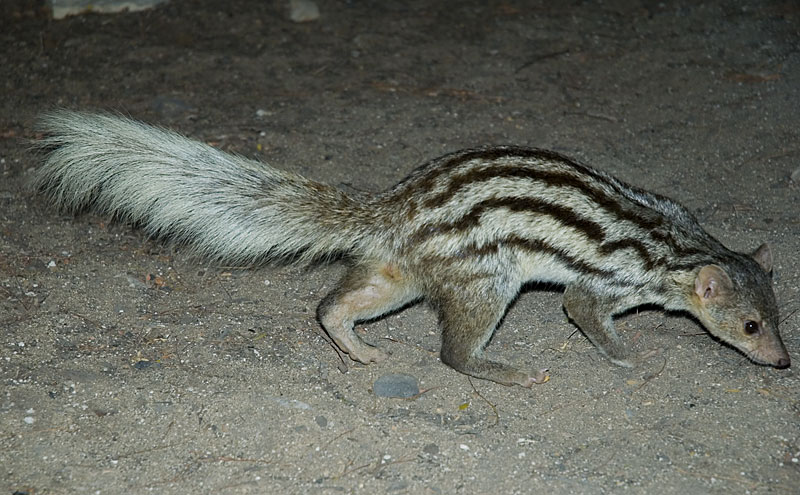

Conservation status
- Endangered (IUCN 3.1)

Scientific classification
- Kingdom: Animalia
- Phylum: Chordata
- Class: Mammalia
- Order: Carnivora
- Family: Eupleridae
- Genus: Galidictis
- Species: G. grandidieri

Binomial name
- Galidictis grandidieri Wozencraft, 1986
- Grandidier's mongoose range

= Grandidier's mongoose =

Species of carnivore

Grandidier's mongoose (Galidictis grandidieri), also known as the giant-striped mongoose or Grandidier's vontsira, is a small carnivoran that lives only in a very small area of southwestern Madagascar, in areas of spiny forest vegetation. It is pale brown or grayish coloured, with eight wide, dark stripes on its back and sides. Grandidier's mongoose is larger than the related broad-striped Malagasy mongoose, G. fasciata, and its stripes are not as wide. The species is named after Alfred Grandidier.

This species has been called one of the least-studied carnivorans in the world. With a few exceptions, the majority of records of G. grandidieri come from a narrow zone at the western edge of the Mahafaly Plateau in the Parc National de Tsimanampetsotsa, making it the Madagascan carnivore with the smallest range.

Nocturnal and crepuscular, this species lives in pairs which produce one offspring a year, in the summer. They hunt primarily by searching through ground litter and in rock crevices. The diet of Grandidier's mongoose varies markedly between the dry and wet seasons. Whereas food consists mainly of invertebrates throughout the year, small vertebrates are the most important food by biomass, comprising 58% during the dry season and 80% during the wet season. Grandidier's mongoose weighs 1.1 to 1.3 lb (0.5 to 0.6 kg).

The species is sympatric with two other carnivores, the fossa (Cryptoprocta ferox) and the introduced Indian civet (Viverricula indica). However, there seems to be virtually no range or dietary overlap between these animals and Grandidier's mongoose. From sub-fossil evidence, it is clear that the region underwent drastic climatic change during the last 3000–2000 years. It is presumed that the distribution of this mongoose was notably broader and the proportion of prey types different in earlier times than today. Grandidier's mongoose must have adapted to dryer conditions, which have resulted in its very limited distribution and the exploitation of notably small prey.

The animals can be vocal, with a cooing mew, and are described as sociable and playful.

== Etymology ==
The species is named after Alfred Grandidier, a French naturalist who made zoological collections in Madagascar in the mid-1800s. It was originally given the adjectival name Galidictis grandidiensis but this was later corrected by the author to G. grandidieri in accordance with Article 31(a) of the International Code of Zoological Nomenclature.
