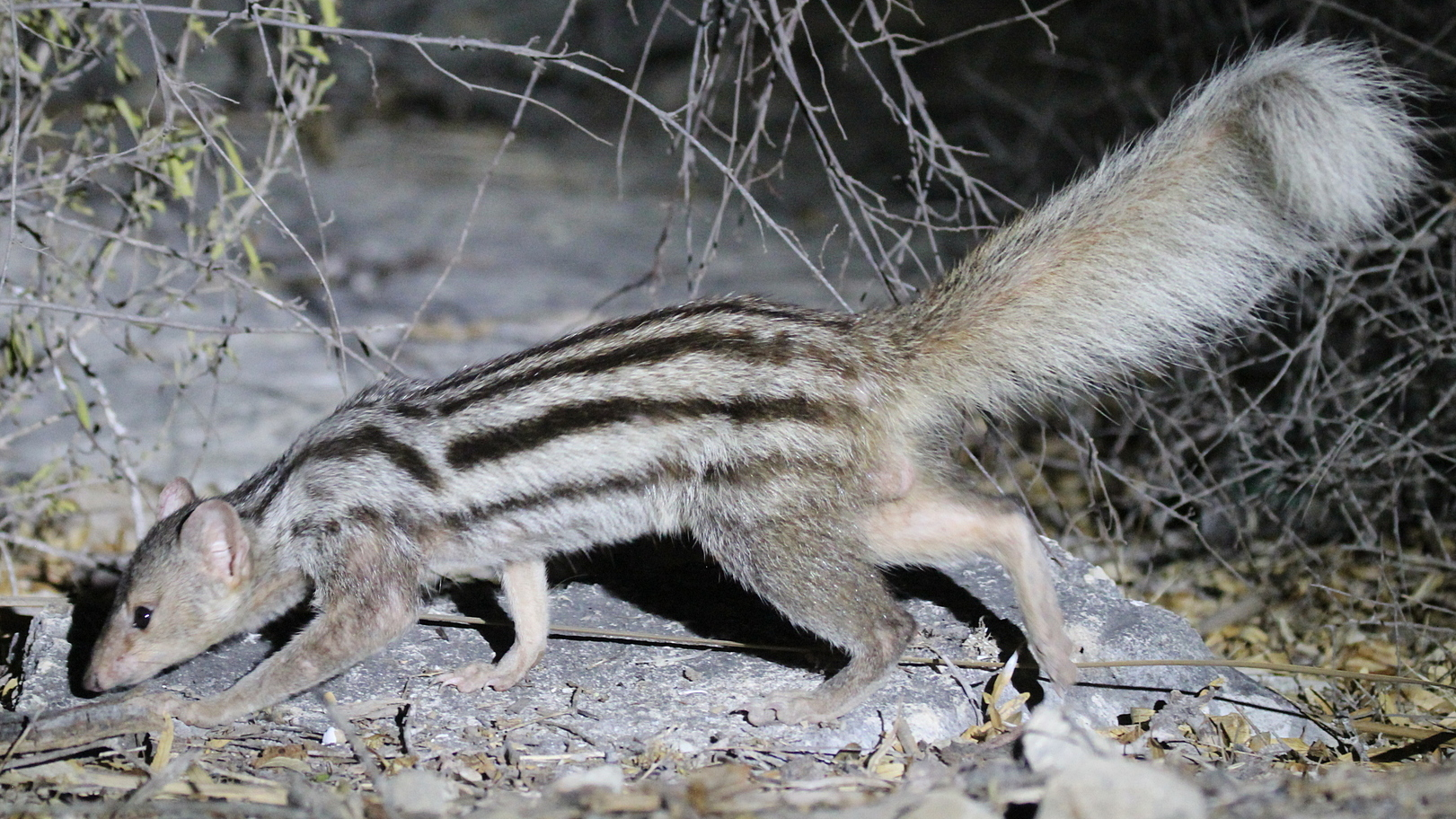

Conservation status
- Vulnerable (IUCN 3.1)

Scientific classification
- Kingdom: Animalia
- Phylum: Chordata
- Class: Mammalia
- Order: Carnivora
- Family: Eupleridae
- Genus: Galidictis
- Species: G. fasciata

Binomial name
- Galidictis fasciata (Gmelin, 1788)
- Broad-striped Malagasy mongoose range

= Broad-striped Malagasy mongoose =

Species of carnivore

The broad-striped Malagasy mongoose or broad-striped vontsira (Galidictis fasciata) is a species of small mongooses native to Eastern Madagascar. The species contains two known subspecies.

== Taxonomy ==
The broad-striped Malagasy mongoose belongs to the animal family Eupleridae, which includes various mongoose-like animals found in Madagascar. The species has two known subspecies– Galidictis fasciata fasciata and Galidictis fasciata striata. The species name fasciata means "banded" in Latin. It is commonly known as the vontsira fotsy or white vontsira in Malagasy language.

== Physical Description ==
Broad-striped mongooses are small to medium sized mongooses with short legs and long bushy tails. They have long and slender heads with a pointed snout. The species has a distinctive coat pattern with broad dark stripes with the body fur varying from reddish-brown to gray. Adults measure about 40–50 cm (16–20 in) in body length with a bushy tail roughly equal in length to the body. The primary characteristics that set the subspecies apart are their stripes and tails. The fasciata sub-species has a fuller, reddish-brown tail and about eight to ten stripes, while the striata sub-species has a thinner, white tail and five stripes.

== Distribution and habitat ==
The species is endemic to eastern Madagascar. It inhabits lowland and montane rainforests at elevations typically ranging between 440 to 1,500 m (1,440 to 4,920 ft). While it is mostly terrestrial, it can climb trees. It prefers dense understory and forest floor habitats where it can hunt in leaf litter and low vegetation. The IUCN lists the broad-striped Malagasy mongoose as vulnerable. Protected areas have been established in Madagascar for the protection of various animal species including member species of the Eupleridae family.

== Behavior and ecology ==
The broad-striped Malagasy mongoose is nocturnal. It forages alone or in pairs, and uses its keen sense of smell and hearing to detect prey. The mongoose is carnivorous and its diet mainly consists of insects, small reptiles, amphibians, and small mammals, which it digs out from soil and leaf litter.
