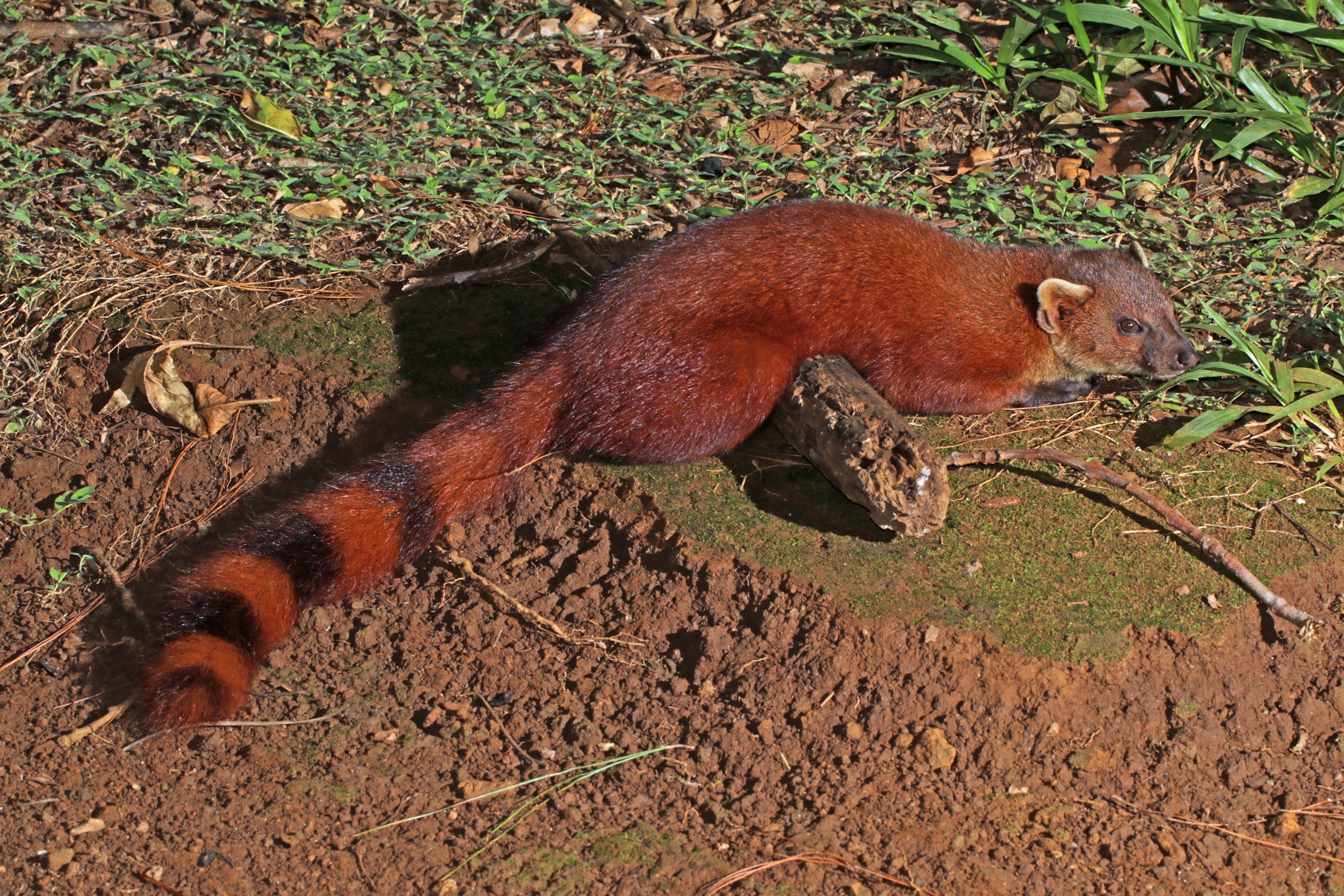
- Montagne d'Ambre National Park

Conservation status
- Least Concern (IUCN 3.1)

Scientific classification
- Kingdom: Animalia
- Phylum: Chordata
- Class: Mammalia
- Order: Carnivora
- Family: Eupleridae
- Subfamily: Galidiinae
- Genus: Galidia; I. Geoffroy Saint-Hilaire, 1837
- Species: G. elegans

Binomial name
- Galidia elegans I. Geoffroy Saint-Hilaire, 1837
- Ring-tailed vontsira range

= Ring-tailed vontsira =

Species of carnivore

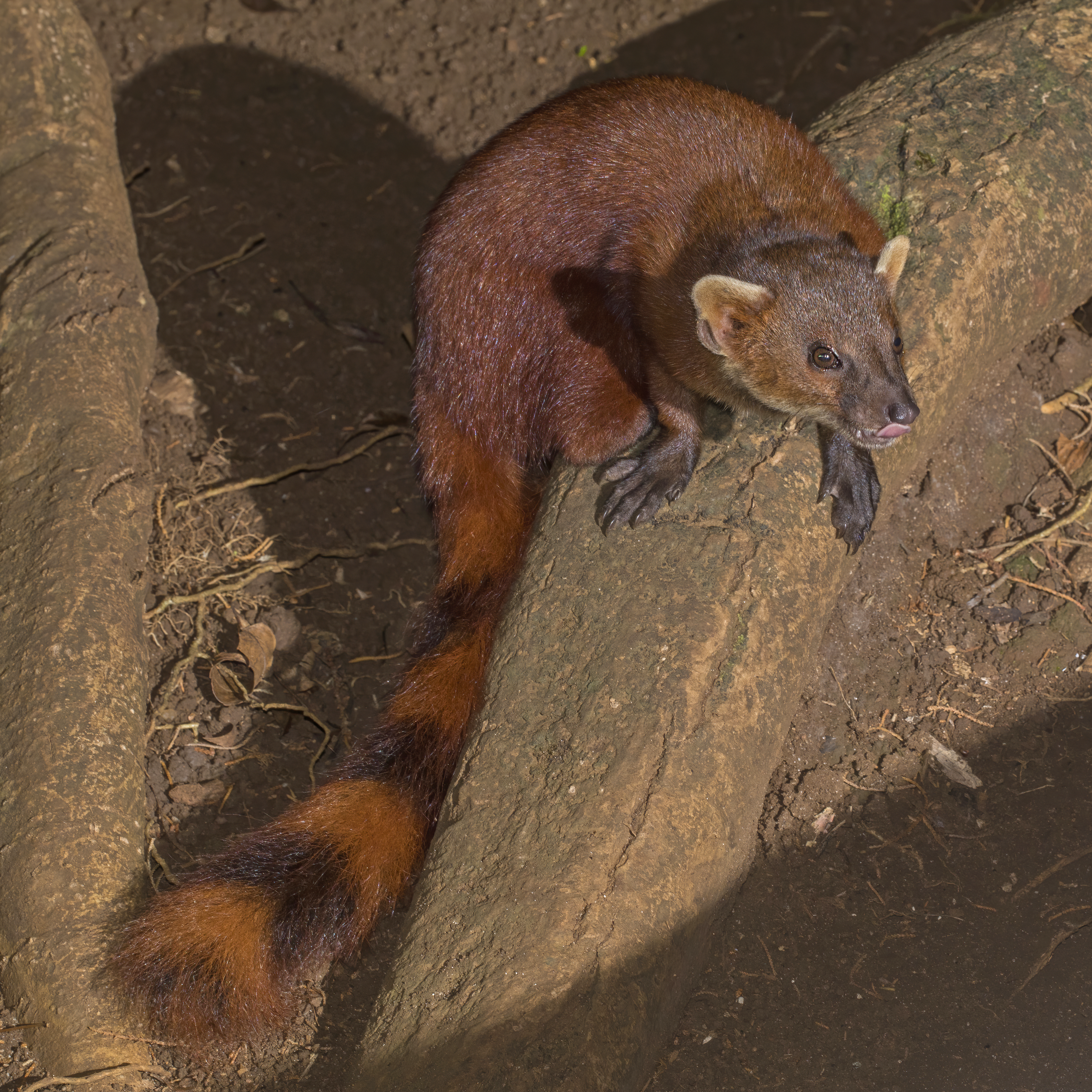

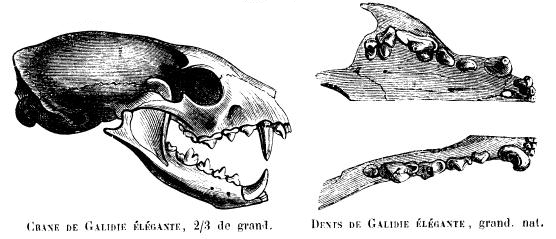
Skull and dentition, as illustrated in Gervais' Histoire naturelle des mammifères

The ring-tailed vontsira (Galidia elegans), locally still known as the ring-tailed mongoose, is a euplerid in the subfamily Galidiinae, a carnivoran native to Madagascar. It is the only species in the genus Galidia.

== Classification and etymology ==
There is much disagreement about the placement of Madagascar's carnivores, including the ring-tailed vontsira, within the phylogenetic tree. A 2003 study reported evidence that the Malagasy Carnivora evolved from a single herpestid ancestor.

A monotypic genus, Galidia literally means "little weasel", being a diminutive form of galē (γαλῆ, "weasel" in ancient Greek). Its local common name is vontsira mena, 'red vontsira' in Malagasy.

== Description ==
The ring-tailed vontsira is relatively small but is the largest member of the subfamily Galidiinae. It is usually 32 to 38 cm (12.5 to 15 in) long and weighs only 700 to 900 g (25 to 32 oz). Its body is long and slender, and the rounded head has a pointed snout. The body is a dark red color and the feet are black. As the name implies, its bushy tail is covered with black and red rings and is similar to the red panda.

Ring-tailed vontsira are very agile, and good climbers. They are quite playful and are active during the day. Their habitat consists of humid forests. Their diet is mostly of small mammals, invertebrates, fish, reptiles, birds, eggs, and occasionally fruit.

The population of ring-tailed vontsira decreased by 20% during the period 1989–1999 due to habitat loss. Another problem is competition with the small Indian civet (Viverricula indica).
