= List of herpestids =

Species in mammal family Herpestidae

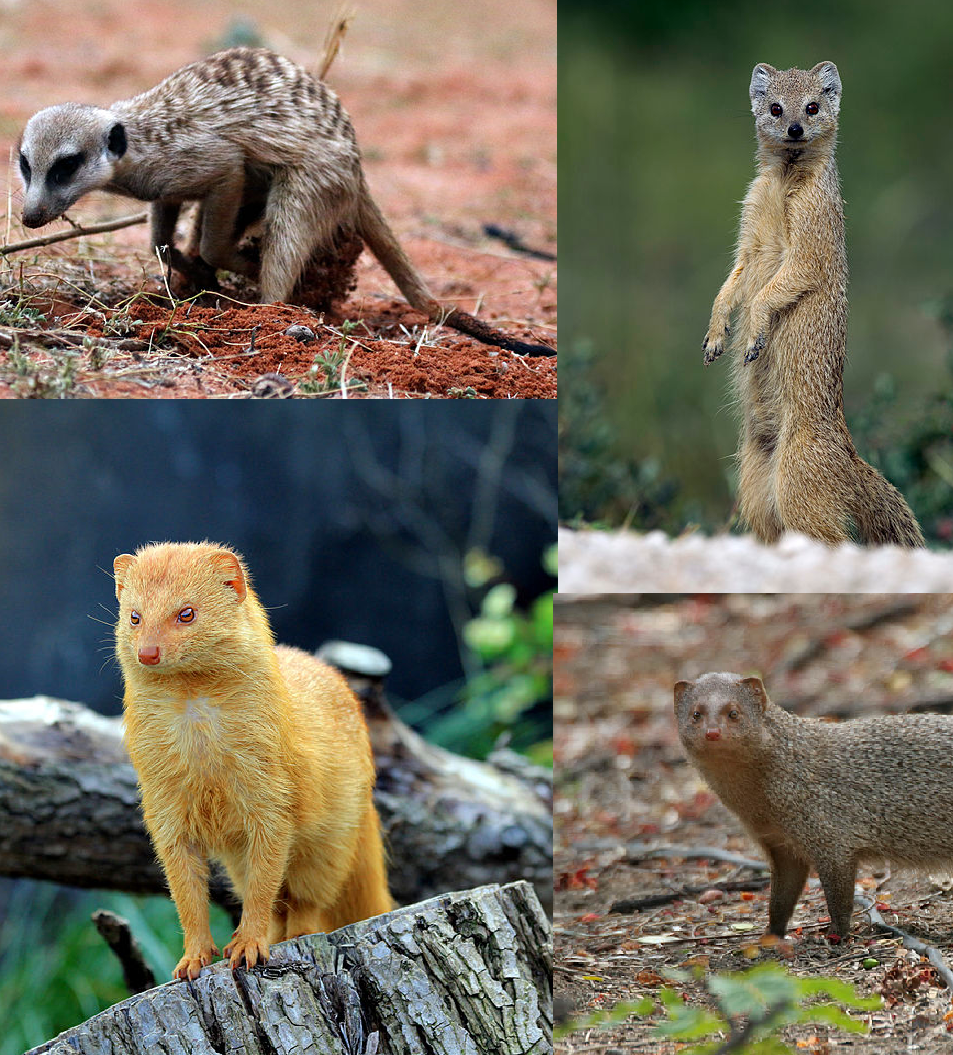
Four mongooses (clockwise from top left): meerkat (Suricata suricatta), yellow mongoose (Cynictis penicillata), Indian grey mongoose (Urva edwardsii), and common slender mongoose (Herpestes sanguinea)

Herpestidae is a family of mammals in the order Carnivora, composed of the mongooses and the meerkat. A member of this family is called a mongoose or a herpestid. They are widespread primarily throughout Africa and south Asia, and are found primarily in forests, savannas, shrublands, and grasslands, though some species can be found in wetlands or deserts. Most mongooses are 30–60 cm (12–24 in) long, plus a 20–40 cm (8–16 in) tail, though the Ethiopian dwarf mongoose can be as small as 18 cm (7 in) plus a 12 cm (5 in) tail, and the white-tailed mongoose can be up to 104 cm (41 in) plus a 47 cm (14 in) tail. Most species do not have population estimates, though one, the Liberian mongoose, is classified as vulnerable with a population size of around 5,000. No herpestid species have been domesticated.

The 34 species of Herpestidae are split into 14 genera within 2 subfamilies: Herpestinae, comprising 23 extant species that are native to southern Europe, Africa and Asia, and Mungotinae, comprising 11 extant species native to Africa. Extinct species have also been placed into both subfamilies, though some older extinct species have not been categorized into a subfamily. Around ten extinct Herpestidae species have been discovered, though due to ongoing research and discoveries the exact number and categorization is not fixed. Herpestidae is believed to have diverged from the existing Feliformia suborder around 21.8 million years ago in the Early Miocene.

== Conventions ==
IUCN Red List categories
Conservation status
- EX: Extinct (0 species)
- EW: Extinct in the wild (0 species)
- CR: Critically endangered (0 species)
- EN: Endangered (0 species)
- VU: Vulnerable (1 species)
- NT: Near threatened (3 species)
- LC: Least concern (29 species)

Other categories
- DD: Data deficient (1 species)
- NE: Not evaluated (0 species)

The author citation for the species or genus is given after the scientific name; parentheses around the author citation indicate that this was not the original taxonomic placement. Conservation status codes listed follow the International Union for Conservation of Nature (IUCN) Red List of Threatened Species. Range maps are provided wherever possible; if a range map is not available, a description of the herpestid's range is provided. Ranges are based on the IUCN Red List for that species unless otherwise noted.

== Classification ==
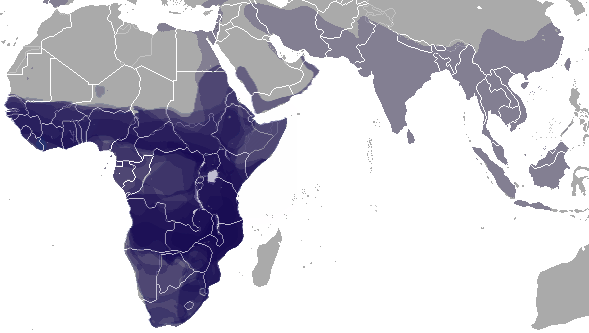
Herpestidae distribution

The family Herpestidae consists of 34 extant species belonging to 15 genera in 2 subfamilies and divided into dozens of subspecies. This does not include hybrid species or extinct prehistoric species.

- Subfamily Herpestinae
  - Genus Atilax: one species
  - Genus Bdeogale: three species
  - Genus Cynictis: one species
  - Genus Herpestes: five species
  - Genus Ichneumia: one species
  - Genus Paracynictis: one species
  - Genus Rhynchogale: one species
  - Genus Urva: nine species
  - Genus Xenogale: one species
- Subfamily Mungotinae
  - Genus Crossarchus: four species
  - Genus Dologale: one species
  - Genus Helogale: two species
  - Genus Liberiictis: one species
  - Genus Mungos: two species
  - Genus Suricata: one species

- Herpestidae
  - Herpestinae
    - - - - - Bdeogale
            - Rhynchogale
          - - Cynictis
            - Paracynictis
        - Ichneumia
      - Herpestes
    - - Atilax
      - Urva
  - Mungotinae
    - - - - Dologale
          - Helogale
        - Crossarchus
      - - Liberiictis
        - Mungos
    - Suricata

== Herpestids ==
The following classification is based on the taxonomy described by Mammal Species of the World (2005), with augmentation by proposals accepted by the American Society of Mammalogists since using molecular phylogenetic analysis.

=== Subfamily Herpestinae ===
Genus Atilax – F. Cuvier, 1826 – one species
Common name	Scientific name and subspecies	Range	Size and ecology	IUCN status and estimated population
Marsh mongoose	A. paludinosus (G. Cuvier, 1829) Eleven subspecies: A. p. macrodon; A. p. mitis; A. p. mordax; A. p. nigerianus; A. p. paludinosus; A. p. pluto; A. p. robustus; A. p. rubellus; A. p. rubescens; A. p. spadiceus; A. p. transvaalensis	Sub-Saharan Africa	Size: 46–64 cm (18–25 in) long, plus 31–41 cm (12–16 in) tail Habitat: Forest, grassland, inland wetlands, neritic marine, and coastal marine Diet: Crustaceans as well as other aquatic prey and rodents	LC Unknown

Genus Bdeogale – Peters, 1850 – three species
Common name	Scientific name and subspecies	Range	Size and ecology	IUCN status and estimated population
Black-footed mongoose	B. nigripes Pucheran, 1855	Central Africa	Size: 45–65 cm (18–26 in) long, plus 30–40 cm (12–16 in) tail Habitat: Forest Diet: Mammals, as well as reptiles, birds, insects, and centipedes	LC Unknown
Bushy-tailed mongoose	B. crassicauda Peters, 1852 Five subspecies: B. c. crassicauda; B. c. nigrescens; B. c. omnivora; B. c. puisa; B. c. tenuis	Southeast Africa	Size: 36–52 cm (14–20 in) long, plus 22–29 cm (9–11 in) tail Habitat: Forest, savanna, and shrubland Diet: Omnivorous	LC Unknown
Jackson's mongoose	B. jacksoni (Thomas, 1894)	East-central Africa	Size: 50–58 cm (20–23 in) long, plus 28–33 cm (11–13 in) tail Habitat: Forest Diet: Rodents and insects	NT Unknown

Genus Cynictis – Ogilby, 1833 – one species
Common name	Scientific name and subspecies	Range	Size and ecology	IUCN status and estimated population
Yellow mongoose	C. penicillata (Cuvier, 1829) Twelve subspecies: C. p. bechuanae; C. p. brachyura; C. p. bradfieldi; C. p. cinderella; C. p. coombsi; C. p. intensa; C. p. kalaharica; C. p. karasensis; C. p. lepturus; C. p. ogilbyii; C. p. pallidior; C. p. penicillata	Southern Africa	Size: 26–46 cm (10–18 in) long, plus 16–30 cm (6–12 in) tail Habitat: Savanna, shrubland, and grassland Diet: Insects, as well as rodents, birds, other vertebrates, and arachnids	LC Unknown

Genus Herpestes – Illiger, 1811 – five species
Common name	Scientific name and subspecies	Range	Size and ecology	IUCN status and estimated population
Angolan slender mongoose	H. flavescens Bocage, 1889 Two subspecies: H. f. flavescens; H. f. nigratus (black mongoose)	Southwestern Africa	Size: 31–36 cm (12–14 in) long, plus 31–37 cm (12–15 in) tail Habitat: Shrubland and rocky areas Diet: Invertebrates, small mammals, birds, lizards, and snakes	LC Unknown
Egyptian mongoose	H. ichneumon (Linnaeus, 1758) Eleven subspecies: H. i. angolensis; H. i. cafra; H. i. centralis; H. i. funestus; H. i. ichneumon; H. i. mababiensis; H. i. numidicus; H. i. parvidens; H. i. sabiensis; H. i. sangronizi; H. i. widdringtonii	Sub-Saharan Africa, Nile river, and Mediterranean (native, green); Iberian peninsula (introduced, red)	Size: 48–60 cm (19–24 in) long, plus 33–55 cm (13–22 in) tail Habitat: Forest, savanna, shrubland, grassland, and inland wetlands Diet: Omnivorous	LC Unknown
Cape gray mongoose	H. pulverulentus Wagner, 1839 Three subspecies: H. p. basuticus; H. p. pulverulentus; H. p. ruddi	Southern Africa	Size: 29–43 cm (11–17 in) long, plus 20–34 cm (8–13 in) tail Habitat: Shrubland and inland wetlands Diet: Small mammals and insects	LC Unknown
Common slender mongoose	H. sanguineus Rüppell, 1836 26 subspecies: H. s. canus; H. s. cauui; H. s. dasilvai; H. s. dentifer; H. s. fulvidior; H. s. galbus; H. s. gracilis; H. s. grantii; H. s. ibeae; H. s. ignitus; H. s. lancasteri; H. s. melanura; H. s. mossambica; H. s. mustela; H. s. mutgigella; H. s. orestes; H. s. parvipes; H. s. perfulvidus; H. s. phoenicurus; H. s. proteus; H. s. rendilis; H. s. saharae; H. s. sanguinea; H. s. swalius (Namaqua slender mongoose); H. s. swinnyi; H. s. ugandae	Sub-Saharan Africa	Size: 27–35 cm (11–14 in) long, plus 19–33 cm (7–13 in) tail Habitat: Forest, savanna, shrubland, and grassland Diet: Small vertebrates and invertebrates	LC Unknown
Somalian slender mongoose	H. ochraceus Gray, 1848 Four subspecies: H. o. bocagei; H. o. fulvidior; H. o. ochracea; H. o. perfulvidus	Eastern Africa	Size: 25–29 cm (10–11 in) long, plus 22–28 cm (9–11 in) tail Habitat: Shrubland and desert Diet: Believed to be invertebrates and small vertebrates	LC Unknown

Genus Ichneumia – Geoffroy, 1837 – one species
Common name	Scientific name and subspecies	Range	Size and ecology	IUCN status and estimated population
White-tailed mongoose	I. albicauda (Cuvier, 1829) Seven subspecies: I. a. albicauda; I. a. dialeucos; I. a. grandis; I. a. haagneri; I. a. ibeanus; I. a. loandae; I. a. loempo	Sub-Saharan Africa, southern Arabic peninsula	Size: 51–104 cm (20–41 in) long, plus 34–47 cm (13–19 in) tail Habitat: Forest, savanna, shrubland, grassland, and inland wetlands Diet: Insects	LC Unknown

Genus Paracynictis – Pocock, 1916 – one species
Common name	Scientific name and subspecies	Range	Size and ecology	IUCN status and estimated population
Selous's mongoose	P. selousi (Winton, 1896) Four subspecies: P. s. bechuanae; P. s. ngamiensis; P. s. selousi; P. s. sengaani	Southern Africa	Size: 63–90 cm (25–35 in) long, plus 28–43 cm (11–17 in) tail Habitat: Savanna and grassland Diet: Invertebrates, as well as small rodents, amphibians, reptiles, and birds	LC Unknown

Genus Rhynchogale – Thomas, 1894 – one species
Common name	Scientific name and subspecies	Range	Size and ecology	IUCN status and estimated population
Meller's mongoose	R. melleri (Gray, 1865) Two subspecies: R. m. langi; R. m. melleri	Southeastern Africa	Size: 36–57 cm (14–22 in) long, plus 30–42 cm (12–17 in) tail Habitat: Forest, savanna, and shrubland Diet: Termites, as well as other invertebrates	LC Unknown

Genus Urva – Hodgson, 1836 – nine species
Common name	Scientific name and subspecies	Range	Size and ecology	IUCN status and estimated population
Collared mongoose	U. semitorquata (Gray, 1846) Two subspecies: U. s. semitorquata; U. s. uniforma	Borneo in Southeast Asia	Size: 40–46 cm (16–18 in) long, plus 25–31 cm (10–12 in) tail Habitat: Forest Diet: Unknown	NT Unknown
Crab-eating mongoose	U. urva (Hodgson, 1836) Four subspecies: U. u. annamensis; U. u. formosana; U. u. sinensis; U. u. urva	Eastern and Southeast Asia	Size: 45–50 cm (18–20 in) long, plus 25–30 cm (10–12 in) tail Habitat: Forest, shrubland, and grassland Diet: Crustaceans, mammals, reptiles, insects, and amphibians	LC Unknown
Indian brown mongoose	U. fusca (Waterhouse, 1838) Five subspecies: U. f. flavidens; U. f. fusca; U. f. maccarthiae; U. f. rubidior; U. f. siccata	South India, Sri Lanka	Size: 33–48 cm (13–19 in) long, plus 20–33 cm (8–13 in) tail Habitat: Forest and grassland Diet: Believed to be a variety of small vertebrates and invertebrates	LC Unknown
Indian grey mongoose	U. edwardsii (Geoffroy, 1818) Five subspecies: U. e. edwardsii; U. e. ferruginea; U. e. lanka; U. e. montana; U. e. nyula	India, west Asia	Size: 36–45 cm (14–18 in) long, plus 32–45 cm (13–18 in) tail Habitat: Forest, shrubland, and grassland Diet: Small mammals, birds, reptiles, eggs, and invertebrates	LC Unknown
Javan mongoose	U. javanica (Geoffroy, 1818) Nine subspecies: U. j. exilis; H. j. javanica; U. j. orientalis; U. j. peninsulae; U. j. perakensis; U. j. rafflesii; U. j. rubrifrons; U. j. siamensis; U. j. tjerapai	Southeast Asia	Size: 25–37 cm (10–15 in) long, plus 24–27 cm (9–11 in) tail Habitat: Forest, savanna, shrubland, grassland, and inland wetlands Diet: Invertebrates, as well as rodents, birds, snakes, lizards, frogs, fish, and fruit	LC Unknown
Small Indian mongoose	U. auropunctata (Hodgson, 1836) Three subspecies: U. j. auropunctata; U. j. pallipes; U. j. palustris (Bengal mongoose)	West, south, and southeast Asia	Size: 25–37 cm (10–15 in) long, plus 24–27 cm (9–11 in) tail Habitat: Forest, savanna, shrubland, grassland, and inland wetlands Diet: Invertebrates, as well as rodents, birds, snakes, lizards, frogs, fish, and fruit	LC Unknown
Ruddy mongoose	U. smithii (Gray, 1837) Three subspecies: U. s. smithii; U. s. thysanura; U. s. zeylania	India and Sri Lanka	Size: 39–45 cm (15–18 in) long, plus 35–47 cm (14–19 in) tail Habitat: Forest and shrubland Diet: Rodents, birds, and reptiles	LC Unknown
Short-tailed mongoose	U. brachyura (Gray, 1837) Six subspecies: U. b. brachyura; U. b. hosei (Hose's mongoose); U. b. javanensis; U. b. palawana; U. b. parva; U. b. sumatria	Southeast Asia	Size: 38–45 cm (15–18 in) long, plus 20–25 cm (8–10 in) tail Habitat: Forest and shrubland Diet: Invertebrates and small vertebrates	NT Unknown
Stripe-necked mongoose	U. vitticolla (Bennett, 1835) Two subspecies: U. v. inornata; U. v. vitticolla	Southern India and Sri Lanka	Size: 25–41 cm (10–16 in) long, plus 22–36 cm (9–14 in) tail Habitat: Forest and shrubland Diet: Small mammals, birds, birds' eggs, reptiles, fish, insects, and roots	LC Unknown

Genus Xenogale – Allen, 1919 – one species
Common name	Scientific name and subspecies	Range	Size and ecology	IUCN status and estimated population
Long-nosed mongoose	X. naso (Winton, 1901)	Central Africa	Size: 40–61 cm (16–24 in) long, plus 32–43 cm (13–17 in) tail Habitat: Forest and inland wetlands Diet: Omnivorous	LC Unknown

=== Subfamily Mungotinae ===
Genus Crossarchus – F. Cuvier, 1825 – four species
Common name	Scientific name and subspecies	Range	Size and ecology	IUCN status and estimated population
Alexander's kusimanse	C. alexandri Thomas, 1907	Central Africa	Size: 37–44 cm (15–17 in) long, plus 24–32 cm (9–13 in) tail Habitat: Forest Diet: Invertebrates and fruit, as well as frogs, snakes, and carrion	LC Unknown
Angolan kusimanse	C. ansorgei Thomas, 1910 Two subspecies: C. a. ansorgei; C. a. nigricolor	Central Africa	Size: 32–35 cm (13–14 in) long, plus 20–22 cm (8–9 in) tail Habitat: Forest Diet: Insects, small vertebrates, and eggs	LC Unknown
Common kusimanse	C. obscurus F. Cuvier, 1825	Western Africa	Size: 29–37 cm (11–15 in) long, plus 14–21 cm (6–8 in) tail Habitat: Forest and savanna Diet: Insects, as well as reptiles, small mammals, and fruit	LC Unknown
Flat-headed kusimanse	C. platycephalus Goldman, 1984	Western central Africa	Size: 21–47 cm (8–19 in) long, plus 15–21 cm (6–8 in) tail Habitat: Forest and inland wetlands Diet: Insects, as well as reptiles, small mammals, and fruit	LC Unknown

Genus Dologale – Thomas, 1926 – one species
Common name	Scientific name and subspecies	Range	Size and ecology	IUCN status and estimated population
Pousargues's mongoose	D. dybowskii (Pousargues, 1893)	Central Africa	Size: 24–30 cm (9–12 in) long, plus 16–22 cm (6–9 in) tail Habitat: Forest, savanna, and grassland Diet: Invertebrates	DD Unknown

Genus Helogale – Gray, 1862 – two species
Common name	Scientific name and subspecies	Range	Size and ecology	IUCN status and estimated population
Common dwarf mongoose	H. parvula (Sundevall, 1847) Seven subspecies: H. p. ivori; H. p. mimetra; H. p. nero; H. p. parvula; H. p. ruficeps; H. p. undulatus; H. p. varia	Southern and eastern Africa	Size: 18–23 cm (7–9 in) long, plus 14–19 cm (6–7 in) tail Habitat: Savanna and grassland Diet: Arthropods, as well as small vertebrates	LC Unknown
Ethiopian dwarf mongoose	H. hirtula Thomas, 1904 Five subspecies: H. h. ahlselli; H. h. annulata; H. h. hirtula; H. h. lutescens; H. h. powelli	Eastern Africa	Size: 18–26 cm (7–10 in) long, plus 12–20 cm (5–8 in) tail Habitat: Savanna, shrubland, and grassland Diet: Invertebrates	LC Unknown

Genus Liberiictis – Hayman, 1958 – one species
Common name	Scientific name and subspecies	Range	Size and ecology	IUCN status and estimated population
Liberian mongoose	L. kuhni Hayman, 1958	Western Africa	Size: 42–55 cm (17–22 in) long, plus 18–21 cm (7–8 in) tail Habitat: Forest Diet: Earthworms, as well as small vertebrates, insect larvae, and fruit	VU 5,200

Genus Mungos – Geoffroy, 1795 – two species
Common name	Scientific name and subspecies	Range	Size and ecology	IUCN status and estimated population
Banded mongoose	M. mungo (Gmelin, 1788) Sixteen subspecies: M. m. adailensis (Adail banded mongoose); M. m. bororensis (Boror banded mongoose); M. m. caurinus (North-west banded mongoose); M. m. colonus (East African banded mongoose); M. m. grisonax (Namibia banded mongoose); M. m. mandjarum (Schwarz's banded mongoose); M. m. marcrurus; M. m. mungo; M. m. ngamiensis (Botswana banded mongoose); M. m. pallidipes; M. m. rossi; M. m. senescens; M. m. somalicus; M. m. talboti (Talbot's banded mongoose); M. m. zebra; M. m. zebroides	Sub-Saharan Africa	Size: 30–40 cm (12–16 in) long, plus 19–31 cm (7–12 in) tail Habitat: Forest, savanna, shrubland, and grassland Diet: Insects, as well as other invertebrates, reptiles, amphibians, bird eggs, young birds, small mammals, and fruit	LC Unknown
Gambian mongoose	M. gambianus (Ogilby, 1835)	Western Africa	Size: 34–36 cm (13–14 in) long, plus 20–22 cm (8–9 in) tail Habitat: Forest and savanna Diet: Insects, as well as lizards, mice, and snakes	LC Unknown

Genus Suricata – Desmarest, 1804 – one species
Common name	Scientific name and subspecies	Range	Size and ecology	IUCN status and estimated population
Meerkat	S. suricatta (Schreber, 1776) Three subspecies: S. s. iona; S. s. marjoriae; S. s. suricatta	Southern Africa	Size: 23–36 cm (9–14 in) long, plus 18–24 cm (7–9 in) tail Habitat: Savanna, shrubland, grassland, and desert Diet: Invertebrates	LC Unknown
