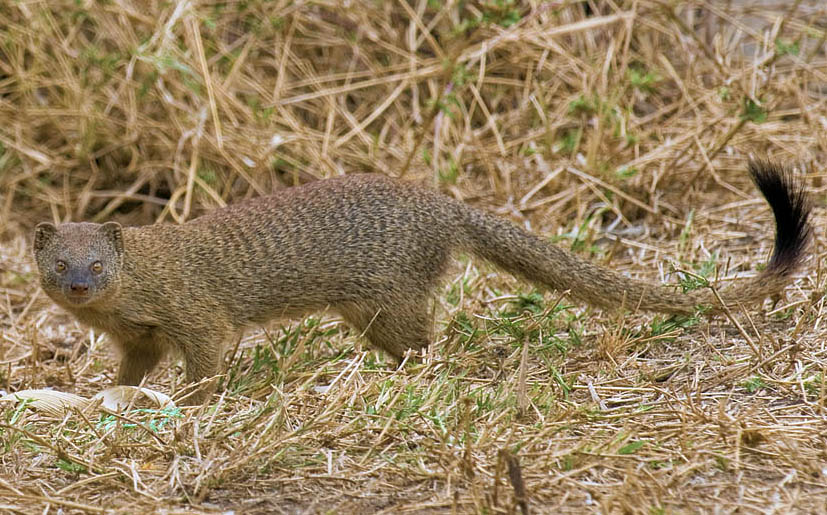

Conservation status
- Least Concern (IUCN 2.3)

Scientific classification
- Kingdom: Animalia
- Phylum: Chordata
- Class: Mammalia
- Order: Carnivora
- Family: Herpestidae
- Genus: Herpestes
- Species: H. sanguineus
- Subspecies: H. s. swalius

Trinomial name
- Herpestes sanguineus swalius Thomas, 1926

= Namaqua slender mongoose =

Subspecies of carnivore

The Namaqua slender mongoose (Herpestes sanguineus swalius), also known as the Namibian slender mongoose, is a subspecies of the common slender mongoose that is endemic to Namibia. It was originally considered separate from the common slender mongoose and thought to be a distinct species. However, further analysis found that the characteristics were not distinguishable as a separate species, and it was classified as a sub-species of the common slender mongoose.

== Taxonomy ==
Namibian slender mongoose is a subspecies of the common slender mongoose in the mongoose family Herpestidae. It was originally described as Herpestes cauui swalius by British zoologist Oldfield Thomas in 1926 and considered to be separate from the common slender mongoose on the basis and color and skull shape. It was provisionally placed under Herpestes sanguineus with the consideration of a possibility to be a distinct species. Further analysis revealed that the characters used to distinguish them were non-distinguishable to classify them as a separate species,, and they were continued to classify as a sub-species of the common slender mongoose.

== Distribution and habitat ==
Namaqua slender mongoose is endemic to Namibia. It is classified as Least Concern in the IUCN Red List.

== Morphology and behavior ==
Slender mongoose is a small mongoose with an elongated body, long tail and short limbs. The head is small with an elongated snout, small eyes, and ears closer to the side of the head. The fur is light brown or grey in color with alternating dark black or brown rings across the body. The tail has coarser hair. There are a pair of anal glands, situated on each side of the anus. It has sharp claws on each of the feet, which are webbed.
