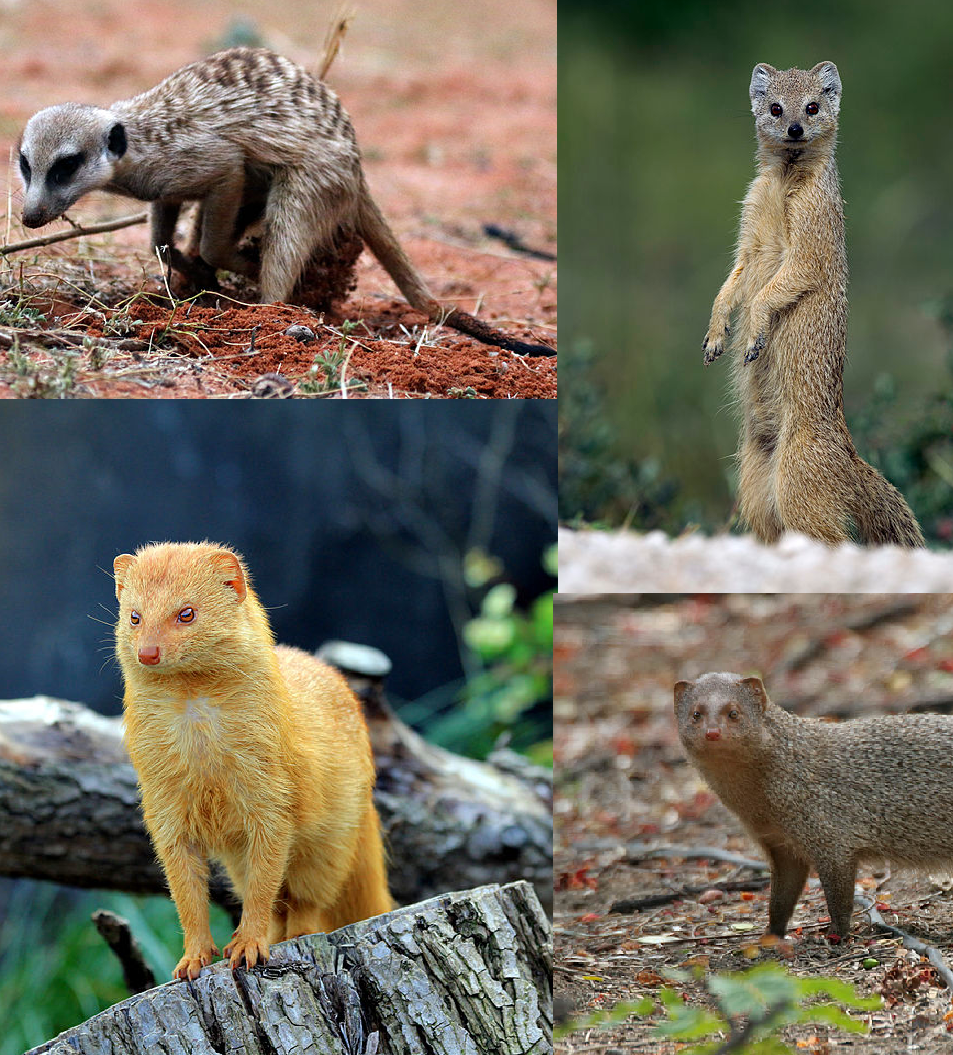
- Top left: Meerkat; Top right: Yellow mongoose Bottom left: Slender mongoose Bottom right: Indian grey mongoose

Scientific classification
- Kingdom: Animalia
- Phylum: Chordata
- Class: Mammalia
- Order: Carnivora
- Superfamily: Herpestoidea
- Family: Herpestidae; Bonaparte, 1845

Type genus
- Herpestes Johann Karl Wilhelm Illiger, 1811

Genera
- List: Atilax; Bdeogale; Cynictis; Galerella; Herpestes; Ichneumia; Paracynictis; Rhynchogale; Crossarchus; Dologale; Helogale; Liberiictus; Mungos; Suricata
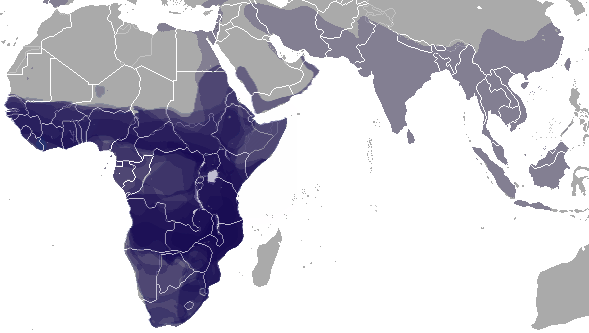

Synonyms
- List: Rhinogalidae, Gray, 1869; Suricatinae, Thomas, 1882; Cynictidae, Cope, 1882; Suricatidae, Cope, 1882; Herpestoidei, Winge, 1895; Mongotidae, Pocock, 1920

= Mongoose =

Mongoose Temporal range: Early Miocene to present, 21.8–0 Ma

Family of mammals in Africa and Asia

A mongoose is a small terrestrial carnivorous mammal belonging to the family Herpestidae. This family has two subfamilies, the Herpestinae and the Mungotinae. The Herpestinae comprises 23 living species that are native to southern Europe, Africa and Asia, whereas the Mungotinae comprises 11 species native to Africa. The Herpestidae originated about 21.8 ± 3.6 million years ago in the Early Miocene and genetically diverged into two main lineages between 19.1 and 18.5 ± 3.5 million years ago. There is a large introduced population on the islands of Hawaii. Mongoose diets are varied but consist of mainly insects, rodents, reptiles and birds.

== Etymology ==
The name is derived from names used in India for Herpestes species: muṅgūs or maṅgūs in classical Hindi; muṅgūs in Marathi; mungisa in Telugu; mungi, mungisi and munguli in Kannada.

The form of the English name (since 1698) was altered to its "-goose" ending by folk etymology. It was spelled "mungoose" in the 18th and 19th centuries. The plural form is "mongooses", although "mongeese" is also used.

== Characteristics ==
Mongooses have long faces and bodies, small, rounded ears, short legs, and long, tapering tails. Most species are brindled or grizzled, while some have strongly marked coats that resemble those of mustelids. Their markings consist of dark legs, stripes, and pale ringed tails. They have narrow, oval pupils and nonretractile claws. Most species have a large anal scent gland, used for territorial marking and signaling reproductive status, and a short and smooth penis with a baculum and an elongated urethral opening on its underside. The dental formula of mongooses is 3.1.3–4.1–23.1.3–4.1–2. They range from 24 to 58 cm (9.4 to 22.8 in) in head-to-body length, excluding the tail. In weight, they range from 320 g (11 oz) to 5 kg (11 lb).

Mongooses are one of at least four known mammalian taxa with mutations in the nicotinic acetylcholine receptor that protect against snake venom. Their modified receptors prevent the snake venom α-neurotoxin from binding. These represent four separate, independent mutations. In the mongoose, this change is effected, uniquely, by glycosylation.

== Taxonomy ==
Herpestina was a scientific name proposed by Charles Lucien Bonaparte in 1845 who considered the mongooses a subfamily of the Viverridae. In 1864, John Edward Gray classified the mongooses into three subfamilies: Galidiinae, Herpestinae and Mungotinae. This grouping was supported by Reginald Innes Pocock in 1919, who referred to the family as "Mungotidae".

Genetic research based on nuclear and mitochondrial DNA analyses revealed that the Galidiinae are more closely related to Madagascar carnivores, including the fossa and Malagasy civet. Galidiinae is considered a subfamily of Eupleridae.

Subfamily	Genus	Species	Image of type species
Herpestinae	Herpestes Illiger, 1811	Egyptian mongoose (H. ichneumon) (Linnaeus, 1758); Common slender mongoose (H. sanguineus) Rüppell, 1835; Cape grey mongoose (H. pulverulentus) (Wagner, 1839); Somalian slender mongoose (H. ochraceus) Gray, 1848; Angolan slender mongoose (H. flavescens) (Bocage, 1889)	
Herpestinae	Atilax Cuvier, 1826	Marsh mongoose (A. paludinosus) (Cuvier, 1829)	
Herpestinae	Cynictis Ogilby, 1833	Yellow mongoose (C. penicillata) (Cuvier, 1829)	
Herpestinae	Urva Hodgson, 1836	Indian grey mongoose (U. edwardsii) (Geoffroy Saint-Hilaire), 1818; Javan mongoose (U. javanica) (Geoffroy Saint-Hilaire, 1818); Stripe-necked mongoose (U. vitticolla) (Bennett), 1835; Small Indian mongoose (U. auropunctata) (Hodgson, 1836); Crab-eating mongoose (U. urva) Hodgson, 1836; Ruddy mongoose (U. smithii) (Gray, 1837); Short-tailed mongoose (U. brachyura) (Gray, 1837); Indian brown mongoose (U. fusca) (Waterhouse, 1838); Collared mongoose (U. semitorquata) (Gray, 1846)	
Herpestinae	Ichneumia Geoffroy Saint-Hilaire, 1837	White-tailed mongoose (I. albicauda) (Cuvier, 1829)	
Herpestinae	Bdeogale Peters, 1850	Bushy-tailed mongoose (B. crassicauda) Peters, 1852; Black-footed mongoose (B. nigripes) Pucheran, 1855; Jackson's mongoose (B. jacksoni) (Thomas, 1894); Sokoke dog mongoose (B. omnivora) Heller, 1914	
Herpestinae	Rhynchogale Thomas, 1894	Meller's mongoose (R. melleri) Gray, 1865	
Herpestinae	Paracynictis Pocock, 1916	Selous's mongoose (P. selousi) (de Winton, 1896)	
Herpestinae	Xenogale Allen, 1919	Long-nosed mongoose (X. naso) (de Winton, 1901)	
Mungotinae	Mungos E. Geoffroy Saint-Hilaire & F. Cuvier, 1795	Banded mongoose (M. mungo) (Gmelin, 1788); Gambian mongoose (M. gambianus) (Ogilby, 1835)	
Mungotinae	Suricata Desmarest, 1804	Meerkat (S. suricatta) (Schreber, 1776)	
Mungotinae	Crossarchus Cuvier, 1825	Common kusimanse (C. obscurus) Cuvier, 1825; Alexander's kusimanse (C. alexandri) Thomas & Wroughton, 1907; Angolan kusimanse (C. ansorgei) Thomas, 1910; Flat-headed kusimanse (C. platycephalus) Goldman, 1984	
Mungotinae	Helogale Gray, 1861	Common dwarf mongoose (H. parvula) Sundevall, 1847; Ethiopian dwarf mongoose (H. hirtula) Thomas, 1904	
Mungotinae	Dologale Thomas, 1920	Pousargues's mongoose (D. dybowskii) Pousargues, 1894	
Mungotinae	Liberiictis Hayman, 1958	Liberian mongoose (L. kuhni) Hayman, 1958	

=== Phylogenetic relationships ===
Phylogenetic research of 18 mongoose species revealed that the solitary and social mongooses form different clades. The phylogenetic relationships of Herpestidae are shown in the following cladogram:

- Herpestidae
  - Herpestinae
    - - - - - Bdeogale
              - - Bdeogale jacksoni (Jackson's mongoose)
                - Bdeogale nigripes (Black-footed mongoose)
              - Bdeogale crassicauda (Bushy-tailed mongoose)
            - Rhynchogale
              Rhynchogale melleri (Meller's mongoose)
          - - Paracynictis
              Paracynictis selousi (Selous's mongoose)
            - Cynictis
              Cynictis penicillata (Yellow mongoose)
        - Ichneumia
          Ichneumia albicauda (White-tailed mongoose)
      - Herpestes
        - Herpestes ichneumon (Egyptian mongoose)
        - - Herpestes sanguinea (Slender mongoose)
          - Herpestes pulverulenta (Cape grey mongoose)
          - Herpestes ochracea (Somalian slender mongoose)
          - Herpestes flavescens (Angolan slender mongoose) (including black mongoose)
    - - - Atilax
          Atilax paludinosus (Marsh mongoose)
        - Xenogale
          Xenogale naso (Long-nosed mongoose)
      - - †"Herpestes lemanensis"
        - Urva
          - - - Urva brachyura (Short-tailed mongoose)
              - Urva semitorquata (Collared mongoose)
            - Urva urva (Crab-eating mongoose)
          - - - Urva smithii (Ruddy mongoose)
              - Urva vitticolla (Stripe-necked mongoose)
            - - Urva fusca (Indian brown mongoose)
              - - Urva edwardsii (Indian grey mongoose)
                - Urva javanica (Small Asian mongoose)
  - Mungotinae
    - - - - Helogale
            - Helogale parvula (Common dwarf mongoose)
            - Helogale hirtula (Ethiopian dwarf mongoose)
          - Dologale
            Dologale dybowskii (Pousargues's mongoose)
        - Crossarchus
          - Crossarchus alexandri (Alexander's kusimanse)
          - Crossarchus ansorgei (Angolan kusimanse)
          - Crossarchus platycephalus (Flat-headed kusimanse)
          - Crossarchus obscurus (Common kusimanse)
      - - Liberiictis
          Liberiictis kuhni (Liberian mongoose)
        - Mungos
          - Mungos gambianus (Gambian mongoose)
          - Mungos mungo (Banded mongoose)
    - Suricata
      Suricata suricatta (Meerkat)

=== Extinct species ===
Atilax Cuvier, 1826

- †A. mesotes Ewer 1956

Herpestes Illiger, 1811

- †H. lemanensis Pomel, 1853

Leptoplesictis Major, 1903

- †L. atavus Beaumont, 1973
- †L. aurelianensis Schlosser, 1888
- †L. filholi Gaillard, 1899
- †L. mbitensis Schmidt-Kittler, 1987
- †L. namibiensis Morales et al., 2008
- †L. peignei, Grohé et al., 2020
- †L. rangwai Schmidt-Kittler, 1987
- †L. senutae Morales et al., 2008

== Behaviour and ecology ==
Some mongoose species are solitary, while others live in pairs or large groups. Some species can learn simple tricks, and are kept as pets to control vermin.

== Cultural significance ==
In ancient Mesopotamia, mongooses were sacred to the deity Ninkilim, who was conflated with Ningirama, a deity of magic who was invoked for protection against serpents. According to a Babylonian popular saying, when a mouse fled from a mongoose into a serpent's hole, it announced, "I bring you greetings from the snake-charmer!" A creature resembling a mongoose also appears in Old Babylonian glyptic art, but its significance is not known.

All mongoose species, except for Suricata suricatta, are classed as a "prohibited new organism" under New Zealand's Hazardous Substances and New Organisms Act 1996, preventing them from being imported into the country.

A well-known fictional mongoose is Rikki-Tikki-Tavi, who appears in a short story of the same title in The Jungle Book (1894) by Rudyard Kipling. In this tale set in India, a young pet mongoose saves his human family from a krait and from Nag and Nagaina, two cobras. The story was later made into several films and a song by Donovan, among other references. A mongoose is also featured in Bram Stoker's novel The Lair of the White Worm. The main character, Adam Salton, purchases one to independently hunt snakes. Another mongoose features in the denouement of the Sherlock Holmes story "The Adventure of the Crooked Man", by Sir Arthur Conan Doyle. The Indian Tamil devotional film Padai Veetu Amman shows Tamil actor Vinu Chakravarthy changing himself into a mongoose by using his evil tantric mantra, to fight the goddess Amman. However, the mongoose finally dies at the hands of the goddess.

Mongoose species are prohibited as pets in the United States.

== See also ==
- List of herpestids
