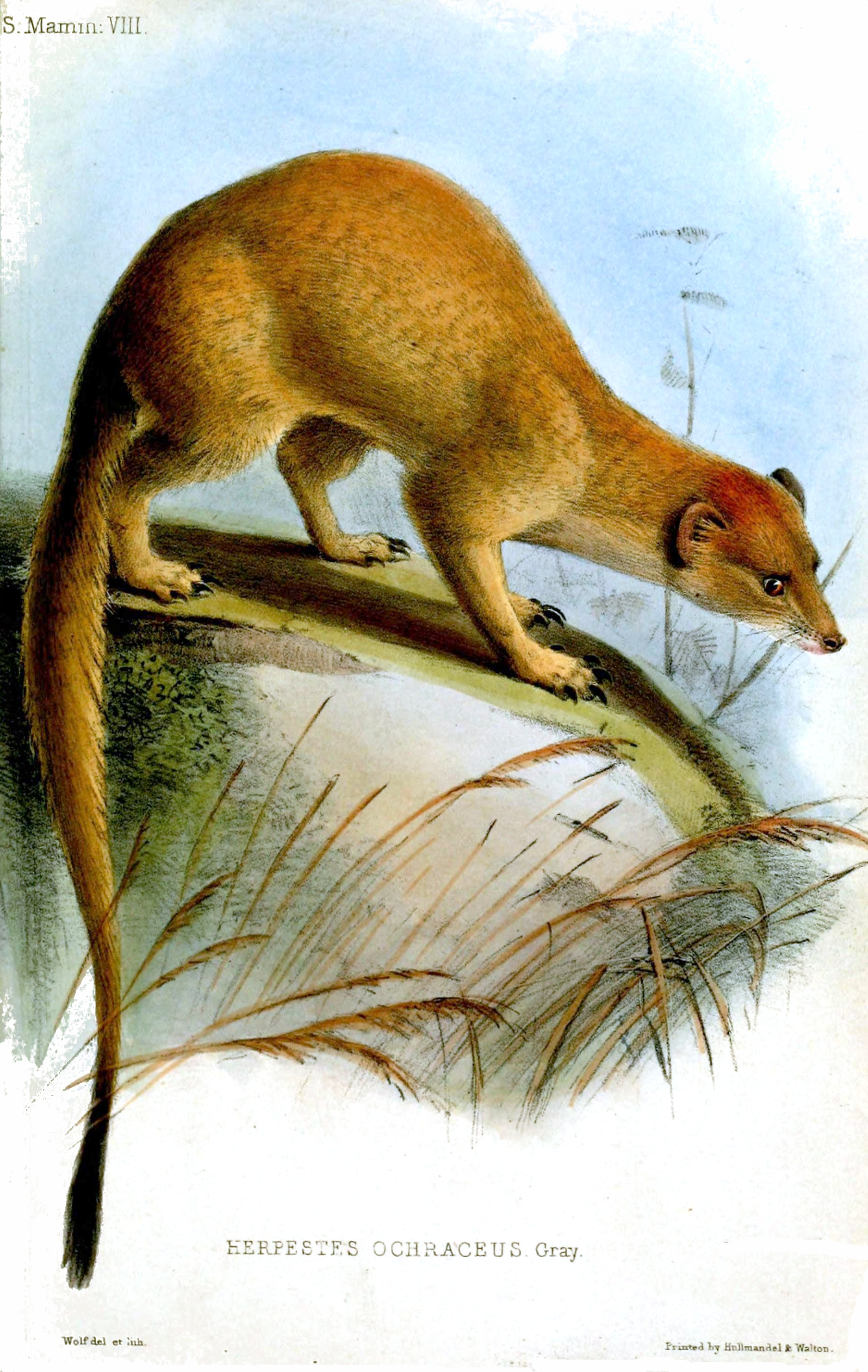

Conservation status
- Least Concern (IUCN 3.1)

Scientific classification
- Kingdom: Animalia
- Phylum: Chordata
- Class: Mammalia
- Order: Carnivora
- Family: Herpestidae
- Genus: Herpestes
- Species: H. ochraceus

Binomial name
- Herpestes ochraceus Gray, 1848
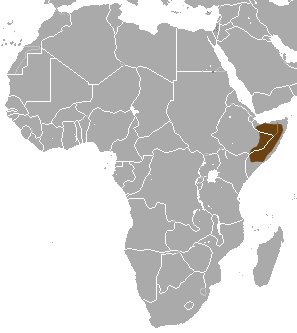
- Somalian slender mongoose range

Synonyms
- Galerella ochracea

= Somalian slender mongoose =

Species of mongoose from Somalia

The Somalian slender mongoose (Herpestes ochraceus) is a small sized mongoose found in Somalia, Ethiopia and Kenya in Eastern Africa. It inhabits the dry areas across the region. It is classified as least concern on the IUCN Red List.

== Taxonomy ==
Somalian slender mongoose (Herpestes ochraceus) belongs to the mongoose family Herpestidae. It was first described by British zoologist John Edward Gray in 1848 based on a brownish yellow specimen of a male mongoose collected in Somalia. Prior to being identified as a separate species, it was categorized as a subspecies of the Common slender mongoose (Herpestes sanguinea). There are four recognized sub-species – ochracea which was described by Gray in 1848, fulvidior and perfulvidus which were described by Oldfield Thomas in 1904, and bocagei which was described by Thomas and Robert Charles Wroughton in 1905.

== Distribution and habitat ==
The mongoose is found in Somalia, Ethiopia and north-eastern Kenya in Eastern Africa. It inhabits the dry areas in the region, and have been recorded up to altitudes of 600 m (2,000 ft) in Ethiopia. Based on available information, it is classified as least concern on the IUCN Red List.

== Morphology and behavior ==
The Somalian slender mongoose is a small sized mongoose with a slender body and a long tail. The males average about 0.6 kg (1.3 lb) in weight, measure about 25–29 cm (9.8–11.4 in) from head to tail and are larger than the females. The color of the fur varies in colour from pale gray to dark brown, and red. Individuals at higher altitudes tend to have darker skin, while paler skin is commonly found in individuals from the dry lowlands. They have large auditory bullae, which is an adaptation for better hearing. It can be differentiated from the common slender mongoose by the absence of the black tail tip. They are diurnal and active during the day.
