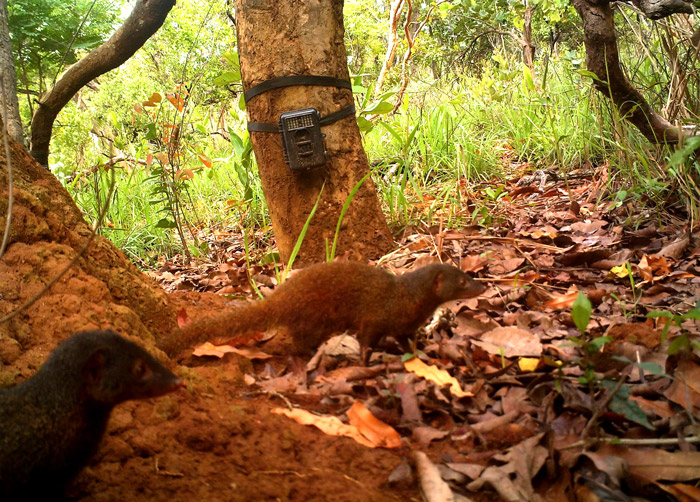
- Wild Pousargues's mongoose in the Chinko Project Area

Conservation status
- Data Deficient (IUCN 3.1)

Scientific classification
- Kingdom: Animalia
- Phylum: Chordata
- Class: Mammalia
- Order: Carnivora
- Family: Herpestidae
- Genus: Dologale; Thomas, 1920
- Species: D. dybowskii

Binomial name
- Dologale dybowskii Pousargues, 1893
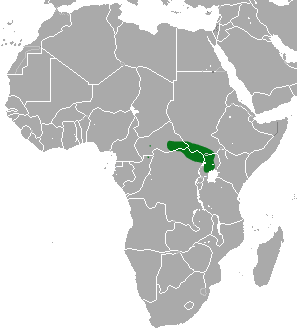
- Pousargues's mongoose range

= Pousargues's mongoose =

Species of mongoose from Central Africa

Pousargues's mongoose (Dologale dybowskii), also known as the African tropical savannah mongoose, is a mongoose native to Central Africa. It is listed as data deficient on the IUCN Red List as little is known about its distribution and ecology. It is the only species in the genus Dologale.

Up to the late 20th century, it was known from only around 30 zoological specimens in natural history museum collections.

== Characteristics ==
The Pousargues's mongoose is brown with a grey belly and face. Its tail is bushy, and its front feet have strong claws. Its body length is between 25 and 33 cm (10 and 13 in) with a 16–23 cm (6.5–9 in) long tail.

== Taxonomy ==
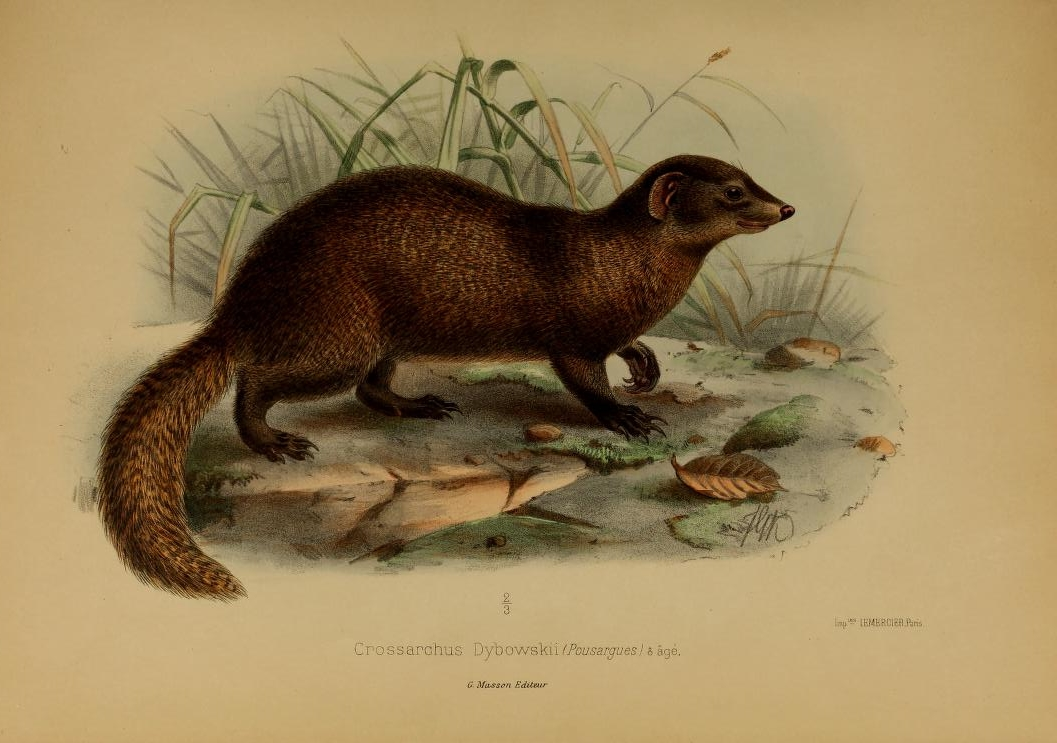
Original drawing of Dologale dybowskii associated with the species description

In 1893, Eugène de Pousargues first described the Pousargues's mongoose on the basis of zoological specimens collected in 1892 near the Kémo River. The type locality corresponds to the former French garrison founded by the Dybowski Mission close to the settlement of Fort de Possel. It is named in honor of Jean Dybowski who collected the specimens. It was initially subordinated to the genus Crossarchus, but was later moved to its own genus, Dologale.

A genetic study focused on Carnivora highlighted the Pousargues's mongoose to be the sister-species of the genus Helogale.

== Distribution and habitat ==
The Pousargues's mongoose ranges from northern Democratic Republic of the Congo, South Sudan, Central African Republic to western Uganda.

Mongooses sighted and recorded by a camera-trap in 2011 and 2012 in the Central African Republic were preliminarily identified as Pousargues's mongoose.

In 2013, a group of Pousargues's mongooses was observed near Lake Albert in Uganda's Semliki Wildlife Reserve. In 2016, an individual was observed and photographed in Garamba National Park.

== Conservation ==
Field research for the collection of basic data on its ecology is indispensable for designing adequate conservation measures.
