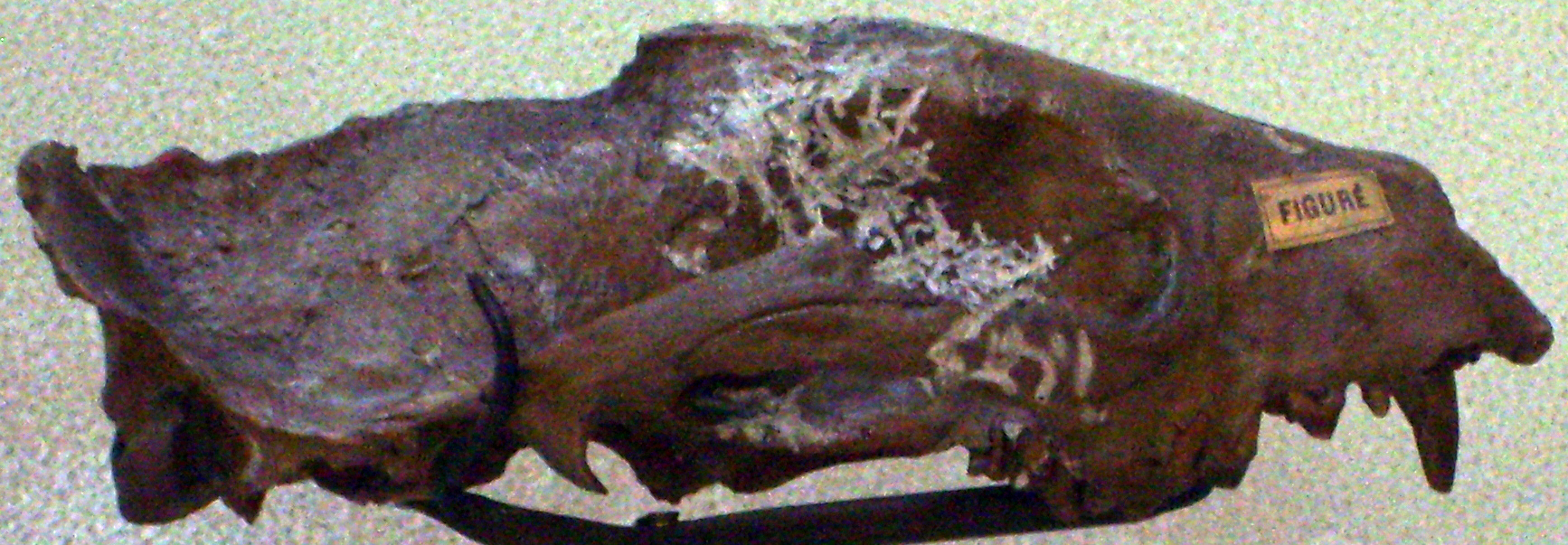
- Herpestes lemanensis skull

Scientific classification
- Kingdom: Animalia
- Phylum: Chordata
- Class: Mammalia
- Order: Carnivora
- Family: Herpestidae
- Genus: Herpestes
- Species: †H. lemanensis

Binomial name
- †Herpestes lemanensis Pomel, 1853

= Herpestes lemanensis =

Herpestes lemanensis Temporal range: Early Miocene

Extinct species of mongoose from Europe

Herpestes lemanensis is an extinct mongoose species that was excavated in Tertiary depositions in France and described by Auguste Pomel in 1853. Its body size equals a large Indian civet, but its dentition resembles that of the Indian grey mongoose.
