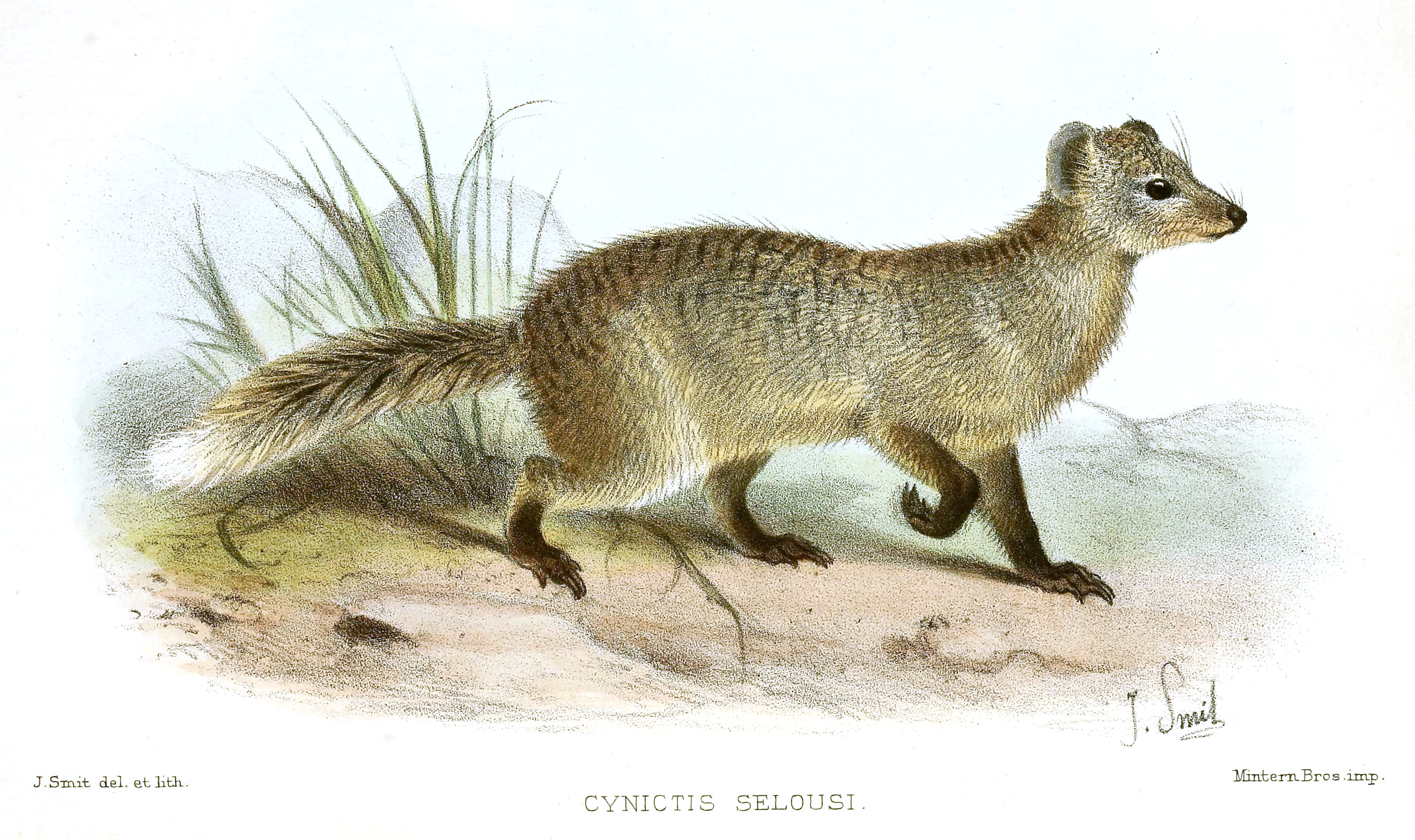

Conservation status
- Least Concern (IUCN 3.1)

Scientific classification
- Kingdom: Animalia
- Phylum: Chordata
- Class: Mammalia
- Order: Carnivora
- Family: Herpestidae
- Genus: Paracynictis; Pocock, 1916
- Species: P. selousi

Binomial name
- Paracynictis selousi (de Winton, 1896)
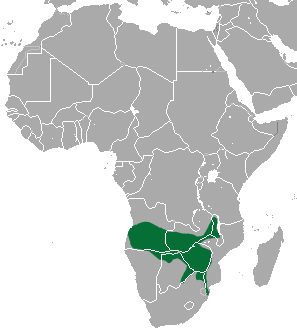
- Selous' mongoose range

= Selous's mongoose =

Species of mongoose from Southern Africa

Selous's mongoose (Paracynictis selousi) is a mongoose species native to Southern Africa. It is the only member of the genus Paracynictis.

== Taxonomy ==
Four subspecies were described:

- Paracynictis selousi bechuanae
- Paracynictis selousi ngamiensis
- Paracynictis selousi selousi
- Paracynictis selousi sengaani

== Distribution and habitat ==
Selous's mongoose is endemic to Southern Africa. Its range includes Angola, Zambia, Malawi, Namibia, Botswana, Zimbabwe, Mozambique, and South Africa.

== Physical description ==
The Selous's mongoose has a total length of 63–90 cm (25–35 in) and a tail length of 28–43 cm (11–17 in). It weighs about 1.4–2.0 kg (3.1–4.4 lb). The body of the mongoose ranges from pale speckled grey to tawny grey with a pale underside, while the legs are brown or black. The tail of the mongoose is white at the tip, making it identifiable from the white-tailed mongoose, which has a tail that is three-quarters white. The Selous's mongoose is also smaller and more slender than the white-tailed mongoose. The mongoose has four digits on each limb and long, slightly curved claws that are associated with digging. The main difference between the sexes is that the female Selous's mongoose has three pairs of nipples on her underside, while the male does not.

== Behavior ==
The Selous's mongoose is a nocturnal species, but has been observed above ground during the day. Although usually solitary, mongooses will sometimes form pairs, and it is not uncommon to see females with young. The Selous's mongoose digs its own burrows, but may opportunistically use those of other animals.

The Selous's mongoose can defend itself by expelling strong-smelling secretion from its anal gland. Its white-tipped tail may be an indication of this ability.

The Selous's mongoose's primary source of food is invertebrates. It also feeds on small rodents, amphibians, reptiles, and birds. The front claws of the mongoose are ideally adapted to search for subterranean beetle larvae. The species will dig through tufts of grass or leaf litter to find food.

Litters are usually made up of two to four young, which are born from August to March.

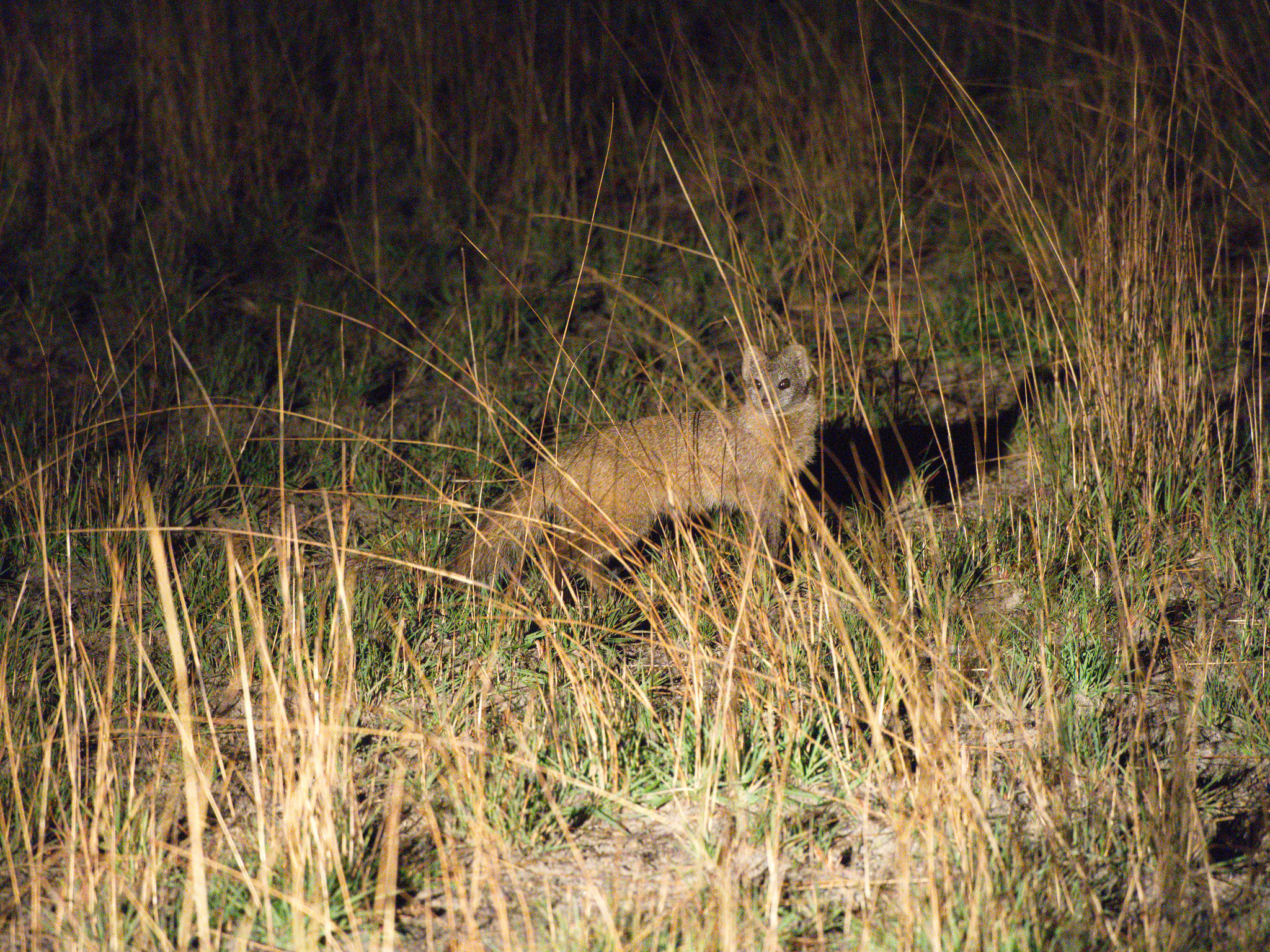
Selous' Mongoose (Paracynictis selousi) in Zambia

== Habitat ==
The Selous's mongoose lives primarily in open scrub and woodland. It does not inhabit either forests or arid areas. It lives in labyrinthine, burrows of its own construction.

== Conservation status and threats ==
The Selous's mongoose is classified as being of least concern. There are no known threats to the species, and the population is widely distributed.

== Etymology of the name ==
The mongoose is named after Frederick Selous. Both Selous's mongoose and Selous' mongoose are accepted spellings of the name. The Selous's mongoose has other names in native African language, as follows:

Afrikaans: Kleinwitstertmuishond Zulu: Nsengane Tswana: Kgano Shona: Jerenyenje.
