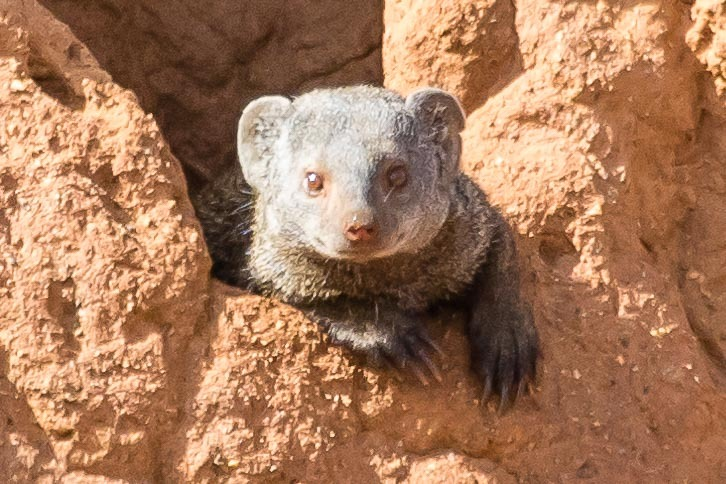

Conservation status
- Least Concern (IUCN 3.1)

Scientific classification
- Kingdom: Animalia
- Phylum: Chordata
- Class: Mammalia
- Order: Carnivora
- Family: Herpestidae
- Genus: Helogale
- Species: H. hirtula

Binomial name
- Helogale hirtula Thomas, 1904
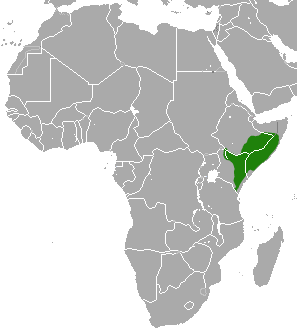
- Ethiopian dwarf mongoose range

= Ethiopian dwarf mongoose =

Species of mongoose from Africa

The Ethiopian dwarf mongoose (Helogale hirtula), also known as the desert dwarf mongoose or Somali dwarf mongoose, is a mongoose native to East Africa, particularly Ethiopia, Kenya, and Somalia.

The Ethiopian dwarf mongoose sends out warning calls to its family if a predator is detected. It also produces general alarm calls when danger is not present. These calls have different pitches which indicate different levels of urgency for the family, could convey the predator's species, distance and elevation to the family all through alarm calls.

== Subspecies ==
- Helogale hirtula hirtula
- Helogale hirtula ahlselli
- Helogale hirtula annulata
- Helogale hirtula lutescens
- Helogale hirtula powelli
