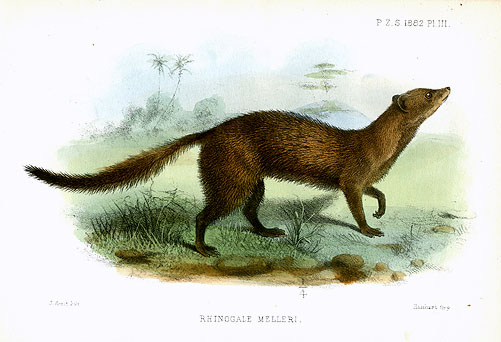

Conservation status
- Least Concern (IUCN 3.1)

Scientific classification
- Kingdom: Animalia
- Phylum: Chordata
- Class: Mammalia
- Infraclass: Placentalia
- Order: Carnivora
- Family: Herpestidae
- Genus: Rhynchogale; Thomas, 1894
- Species: R. melleri

Binomial name
- Rhynchogale melleri (Gray, 1865)
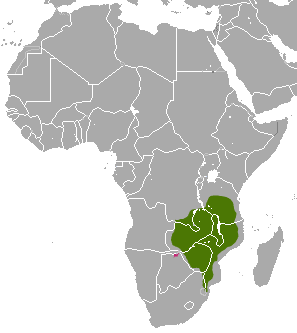
- Meller's mongoose range (green - extant, pink - probably extant)

= Meller's mongoose =

Species of mongoose from Africa

Meller's mongoose (Rhynchogale melleri) is a small brown mongoose native to savannas and woodlands of southeastern Africa. It is the only member of the genus Rhynchogale. The Meller's mongoose lives alone and is active at night, feeding on termites or other small insects and animals. While somewhat rare, it is adaptable and faces no serious threats. It is a member of the mongoose family (Herpestidae), a group of fox-like animals native to Asia, southern Europe, and Africa.

== Taxonomy ==
The scientific name Rhinogale melleri was proposed by John Edward Gray in 1865 for a grey-brown mongoose zoological specimen collected in East Africa. It was placed in the genus Rhynchogale by Oldfield Thomas in 1894.

== Description ==
Meller's mongoose is a medium to large-size mongoose with a light to dark brown body and a long tail. At close quarters the upper parts of Meller's mongoose are coarsely grizzled. The lower parts of the limbs are darker than the upper parts of the body. The under parts are generally lighter in colour than the upper parts. It measures about 80 cm (31 in) in length overall and weighs 2–3 kg (4.4–6.6 lb). The tail is slightly less than half the overall length. The tail is variable in colour and may be black, brown or white, although dark brown to black is the most usual. Meller's mongoose may be confused with the white-tailed mongoose; however, it is smaller and blacker overall than this species.

== Distribution and habitat ==
Meller's mongoose ranges from central Tanzania south through Malawi, Zambia, Zimbabwe and Mozambique, to Eswatini and northeastern South Africa. It has been recorded up to an elevation of 1,850 m (6,070 ft) in Tanzania. It lives in savannas and is associated mainly with open woodland and grassland and marshy areas with termitaria. It lives in miombo (Brachystegia) woodlands in Zambia, Zimbabwe and Malawi and montane bamboo forests in Tanzania. It appears to require dense cover throughout the year and is rarely seen in areas where fires are extensive and frequent.

== Behaviour and ecology ==
Meller's mongoose is nocturnal, solitary and terrestrial. They do not appear until well after sunset and continue to be active until about midnight.

=== Diet ===
Meller's mongoose feeds mainly on termites, particularly harvester termites (Hodotermes) and the larger Macrotermes. They also eat grasshoppers, small reptiles, centipedes, beetles and frogs.

=== Reproduction ===
They appear to breed at the beginning of the wet season (November to December). 2-3 young are born in burrows or rock crevices. Females have two pairs of abdominal mammae.

== Threats ==
There are no major known threats to the species. Its favoured habitat is extensive, and in some parts overlaps with very low human populations. However, human expansion and domestic dogs could represent a significant threat in localised areas. However, in parts of northern South Africa the species has been recorded in areas with high human and domestic dog disturbances.

== Status and abundance ==
Listed as Least Concern on the IUCN Red List, it is apparently uncommon to rare, but it may be easily overlooked or confused with other mongoose species.
