= Liberian mongoose =

Conservation status
- Vulnerable (IUCN 3.1)

Scientific classification
- Kingdom: Animalia
- Phylum: Chordata
- Class: Mammalia
- Order: Carnivora
- Family: Herpestidae
- Genus: Liberiictis; Hayman, 1958
- Species: L. kuhni

Binomial name
- Liberiictis kuhni Hayman, 1958
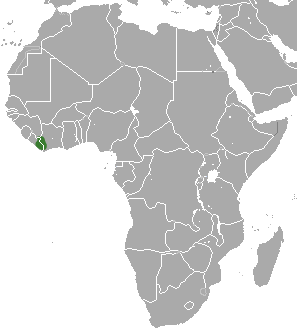
- Range of the Liberian mongoose

Species of mongoose from West Africa

The Liberian mongoose (Liberiictis kuhni) is a mongoose species native to Liberia and Ivory Coast. It is the only member of the genus Liberiictis. Phylogenetic analysis shows it is closely related to other small, social mongooses and that the banded mongoose is its closest relative.

== Description ==
The Liberian mongoose has a primarily dark brown body, with a darker stripe on the neck and shoulders. This stripe is bordered by smaller stripes that are white. Compared with other mongoose species, the Liberian mongoose has rather long claws and an elongated snout with small teeth relative to the size of the skull. It has a bushy tapering tail, that is less than half of the length of the head and body. This is likely an adaptation of their specialized diet of earthworms. One of the few specimens ever seen alive was found in a burrow close to a termite nest. The animal's physical characteristics, and its preferred locality to insects, has led experts to suggest that the Liberian mongoose is primarily insectivorous. The few observers that have witnessed this species in the wild have reported that the animal lives primarily in the trunks of trees. Indeed, some of the better-known mongoose species live in tree during the rainy season and occupy burrows only during hotter weather. The collection of juveniles at the end of July and a lactating female at the beginning of August suggests that breeding coincides with the rainy season, when there is an increase in food availability.

== Ecology and behavior ==
It was discovered in Liberia in 1958. Little was known about the animal, except what local natives related. They typically forage in packs consisting of 3-8 individuals, but larger groups have been observed. Their diet consists of earthworms and various insects. The exact distribution is unknown, but may extend from Sierra Leone to Côte d'Ivoire. Confirmed sightings are restricted to forests in Liberia and the Tai National Park in Côte d'Ivoire. Human activity such as mining, agriculture, hunting and logging has displaced the Liberian mongoose from its previous range. A live specimen was exhibited at the Toronto Zoo, but civil war in Liberia has prevented further study. Due to its limited range and the fact that it is heavily hunted, the Liberian mongoose is considered endangered.

As they forage, they disturb the leaf litter and soil, with an estimate that they may be able to overturn the entire forest floor in a period of 8 months. This altering of the litter environment indirectly affects seed predation and germination. The Liberian mongoose is also host to a species of chewing louse known as Felicola liberiae. Political unrest in the areas in which they live has made further studies difficult in recent years.

== Conservation ==
The Liberian mongoose is listed as Vulnerable on the IUCN Red List. Human destruction of their habitat and human hunting are the primary threats to Liberian mongooses. Owing to their rarity, they were not described until 1958, with the first complete specimens discovered as recently as 1974. An attempt to study them in 1988 yielded only one animal, which had already been killed by a hunter. The specimen that lived at the Toronto Zoo has since died. This rarity also limited what is understood about the Liberian mongoose's interaction with other aspects of the ecosystem. Recent work has shown that they may act as an ecosystem engineer by maintaining the heterogeneity of the forest floor. Through field observations and radio-tracking, a group of mongooses was followed for a period of three months, with a record of their foraging traces being kept.
