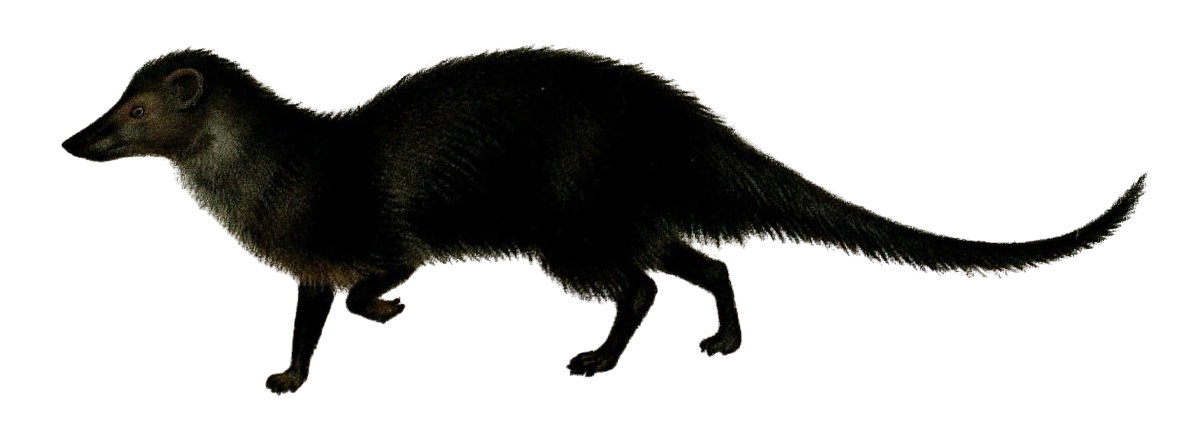

Conservation status
- Least Concern (IUCN 3.1)

Scientific classification
- Kingdom: Animalia
- Phylum: Chordata
- Class: Mammalia
- Order: Carnivora
- Family: Herpestidae
- Genus: Xenogale; Allen, 1919
- Species: X. naso

Binomial name
- Xenogale naso (de Winton, 1901)
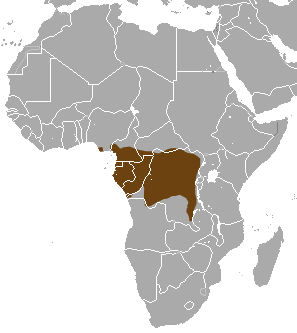
- Long-nosed mongoose range

= Long-nosed mongoose =

Species of mongoose from Central Africa

The long-nosed mongoose (Xenogale naso) is a mongoose native to Central African wetlands and rainforests. It has been listed as Least Concern on the IUCN Red List since 1996. Although formerly classified in Herpestes, more recent studies indicate that it belongs in the monotypic taxon Xenogale.

== Distribution and habitat ==
The long-nosed mongoose is native to wetlands and rainforests from the Niger Delta in Nigeria, Cameroon to the Central African Republic, Equatorial Guinea, Gabon, the Republic of the Congo and the Democratic Republic of the Congo. It has been recorded from sea level up to an elevation of 640 m (2,100 ft).

It is one of the most water dependent species.

== Behaviour and ecology ==
The long-nose mongoose is usually solitary and lives in a home range of 41–46 ha (100–110 acres). It moves up to 4,600 m (15,100 ft) daily in this area foraging for food. It chooses different locations as night-time resting places.

== Threats ==
The long-nosed mongoose's habitat is fragmented because of logging, mining, and slash-and-burn agricultural practices.

In Gabon, it is hunted for sale in bushmeat markets.
