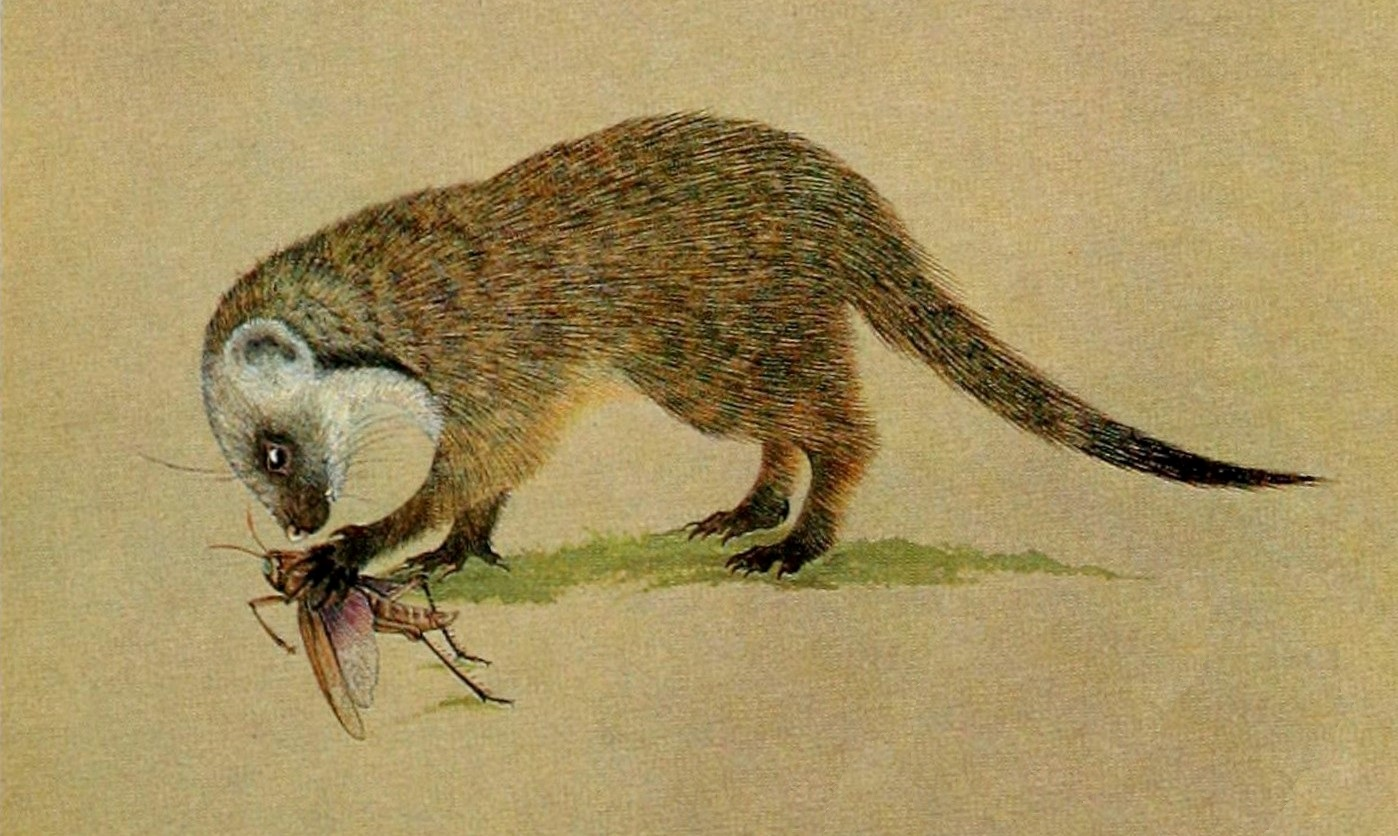

Conservation status
- Least Concern (IUCN 3.1)

Scientific classification
- Kingdom: Animalia
- Phylum: Chordata
- Class: Mammalia
- Order: Carnivora
- Family: Herpestidae
- Genus: Mungos
- Species: M. gambianus

Binomial name
- Mungos gambianus (Ogilby, 1835)
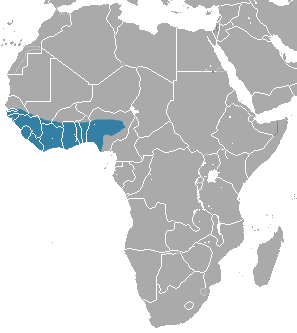
- range of the Gambian mongoose

Synonyms
- Herpestes gambianus Ogilby, 1835

= Gambian mongoose =

Species of mongoose from West Africa

The Gambian mongoose (Mungos gambianus) is a mongoose species native to the Guinean forest-savanna mosaic from Gambia to Nigeria. It is listed as Least Concern on the IUCN Red List since 2008.

== Taxonomy ==
Herpestes gambianus was the scientific name proposed by William Ogilby in 1835 for a mongoose specimen from Gambia.

== Characteristics ==
The Gambian mongoose has a grizzled grey and brown fur, which is mixed with red on the back, hips and thighs. Its throat and the sides of the neck are pale silvery brown, and the neck is marked with a dark brown stripe running from the ear to the shoulder. The breast, belly and inner sides of the legs are red. Its feet are black, and its tail is mixed with black and has a black tuft at the end. It has five toes on each foot, which is bare from the sole to the wrist and heel. Their faces are short, and have only two molars on each jaw. Females have six mammae.

== Distribution and habitat ==
The Gambian mongoose is endemic to West Africa where it can be found in the mesic savannas and woodlands from Senegal and Gambia in the west east to Nigeria.

== Behaviour and ecology ==
The Gambian mongoose is diurnal, gregarious and terrestrial. They live in groups of 10–20 individuals, but groups have been known to number over 40. The groups consist of adults of both sexes, who forage together. Encounters between animals of different groups are often noisy, with a lot of fighting between the neighbors. This mongoose is very vocal, communicating with a variety of sounds. A call that sounds like a bird twitter is used to keep the group together while foraging. A louder, higher pitched twitter is used to indicate danger. The Gambian mongoose is an opportunistic feeder, eating a wide variety of foods. They are primarily insectivorous, eating mostly beetles and millipedes. They will also eat small rodents and reptiles, and sometimes eggs.

=== Reproduction ===
Breeding occurs at any time of the year, with more young born during the rainy season. All the females in the group reproduce at around the same time. Groups can breed up to four times a year, but individually the females do not breed as frequently. Mating occurs 1–2 weeks after the young are born. Mongooses often breed with others of another group, but most stay within the group. While the mother forages for food, two males stand guard at the den's entrance. This mongoose practices communal suckling; cubs suckle from any lactating female. The young are weaned at the age of about one month, and at this time they join the group in foraging.
