= Flat-headed kusimanse =

Conservation status
- Least Concern (IUCN 3.1)

Scientific classification
- Kingdom: Animalia
- Phylum: Chordata
- Class: Mammalia
- Order: Carnivora
- Family: Herpestidae
- Genus: Crossarchus
- Species: C. platycephalus

Binomial name
- Crossarchus platycephalus Goldman, 1984
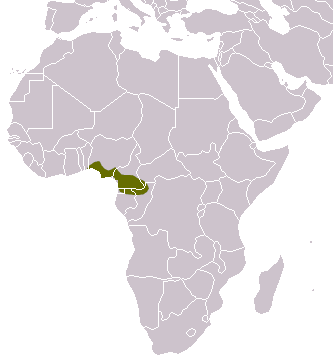
- Flat-headed kusimanse range

Species of mongoose from West Africa

The flat-headed kusimanse (Crossarchus platycephalus) is a mongoose species endemic to Central Africa. It is listed as Least Concern on the IUCN Red List since 2008.

== Description ==
The flat-headed kusimanse has a head to body length of 30 to 36 cm (12 to 14 in) with a long tail measuring 16 to 21 cm (6.3 to 8.3 in). The body is slender and elongated with dark brown or black fur and a mane on the neck. There are five toes in front and rear paws with the front paws have strong claws. The males are slightly larger than the females. An average male weighs about 1 to 1.5 kg (2.2 to 3.3 lb), while an average female weighs between 0.5 to 0.9 kg (1.1 to 2.0 lb). Both sexes have a pair of anal scent glands located in the hind part of the body.

== Distribution and habitat ==
The flat-headed kusimanse is native to Central Africa, with a range extending from southern Benin and southern Nigeria via Cameroon and Equatorial Guinea to the Central African Republic and the northwest of the Republic of the Congo up to an elevation of 1,600 m (5,200 ft). It inhabits dense lowland rainforests and damp savannah landscapes.

== Behavior ==
The flat headed kusimanse is mostly terrestrial, and often forages on rocks, and burrows for termite mounds. It can climb trees, and has a particular affinity towards the fruits of African oil palm trees. Its arboreal skills serve as a refuge from predators, and for other activities. It can be tamed and is cooperative with humans. It is probably diurnal and lives in groups that roam around its territory without a fixed structure. It is generally carnivorous and looks for invertebrates and small vertebrates on the forest floor or in rotted tree trunks.
