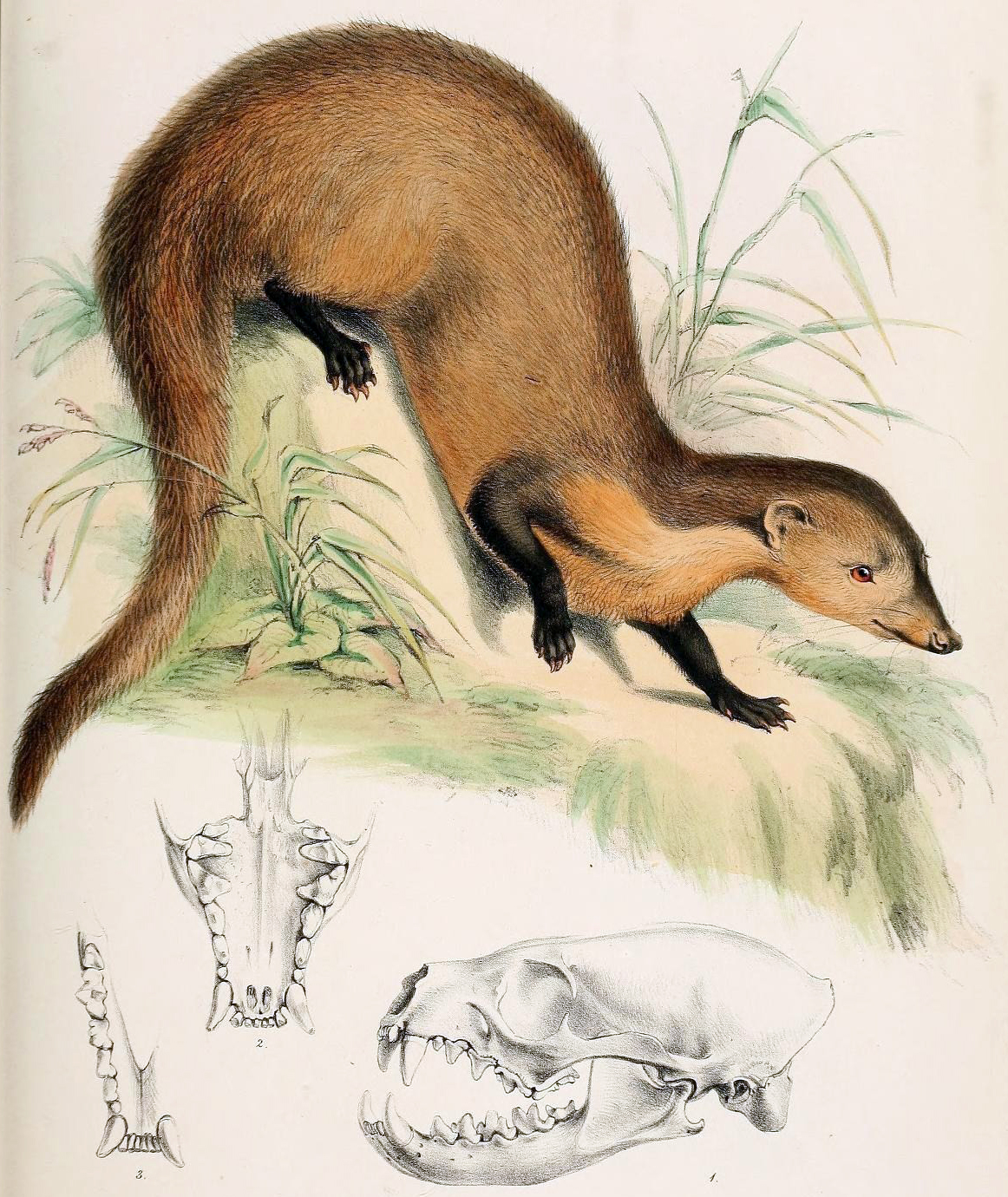

Conservation status
- Near Threatened (IUCN 3.1)

Scientific classification
- Kingdom: Animalia
- Phylum: Chordata
- Class: Mammalia
- Infraclass: Placentalia
- Order: Carnivora
- Suborder: Feliformia
- Family: Herpestidae
- Genus: Urva
- Species: U. semitorquata

Binomial name
- Urva semitorquata Gray, 1846
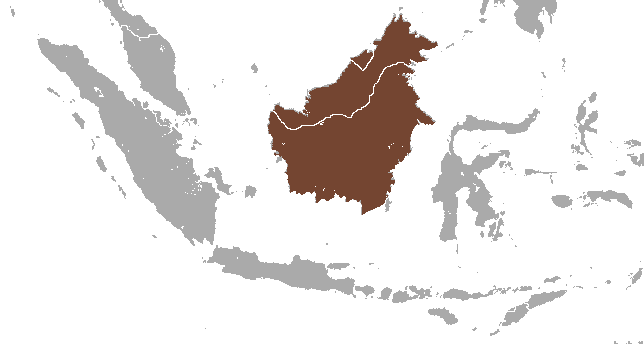
- Collared mongoose range

Synonyms
- List: Herpestes semitorquatus (J. E. Gray, 1846); Herpestes parvus (Jentink, 1895); Mungos palawanus (J. A. Allen, 1910); Mungos parvus (Hollister, 1912); Mungos semitorquatus uniformis (H. C. Robinson & Kloss, 1919); Herpestes brachyurus parvus (Sanborn, 1952); Herpestes semitorquatus semitorquatus (D. D. Davis, 1962); Herpestes brachyurus palawanus (Wozencraft, 2005); Herpestes semitorquatus uniformis (Wozencraft, 2005); Urva semitorquata Patou, McLenachan, Morley, Couloux, A. P. Jennings, & Veron, 2009

= Collared mongoose =

Species of mongoose from Southeast Asia

The collared mongoose (Urva semitorquata) is a mongoose species native to Borneo and Sumatra in Indonesia, and a possible presence in the Philippines. It is classified as Near Threatened on the IUCN Red List.

== Taxonomy ==
In 1846, British biologist John Edward Gray proposed the scientific name of Herpestes semitorquatus for a dark brown mongoose specimen collected from the island of Borneo. In 1919, Herbert C. Robinson and Cecil Boden Kloss placed them in the genus Mungos and proposed the name Mungos semitorquatus uniformis for the specimens of two collared mongooses collected from Ophir district in West Sumatra. The collared mongoose belongs to the family Herpestidae, which includes mongooses native to Africa and Asia. Since the initial description of the species by Gray, the collared mongoose had been assigned various scientific names. It was re-classified under the Herpestes genus in 1952 by Colin Campbell Sanborn. In 2009, Southeast Asian mongooses including the collared mongoose were placed in the genus Urva. The collared mongooses in Borneo and Sumatra exhibit little genetic divergence.

== Appearance ==
The collared mongoose has a body length of up to 43 cm (17 in), and weighs up to 1.5 kg (3.3 lb). There are two colour forms– a rarer reddish form and common brown skinned variant. The fur on the throat is lighter than on the rest of the body, with a unique pale stripe below the ear. The fur on the legs is noticeably darker, with a long, stout tail.

== Distribution and habitat ==
The collared mongoose is distributed in Southeast Asia, including the Malay Peninsula, Sumatra, Borneo, and nearby smaller islands, and possibly in the Philippines. It inhabits lowland and hill forests, mangroves, and sometimes plantations, favoring dense vegetation near streams or wetlands. It inhabits in lowlands and lower montane habitats up to 1,400 m (4,600 ft) elevation. It also inhabits wet swamps, and degraded forests, and is scarcely found in agricultural areas. The collared mongoose is listed as least concern by the IUCN, given its relatively wide distribution.

== Behaviour ==
The collared mongoose is nocturnal mammal, which largely dwells on the ground. It remains mostly solitary, though can sometimes forage in pairs. It is a carnivore and feeds on small mammals, reptiles, birds, and insects.
