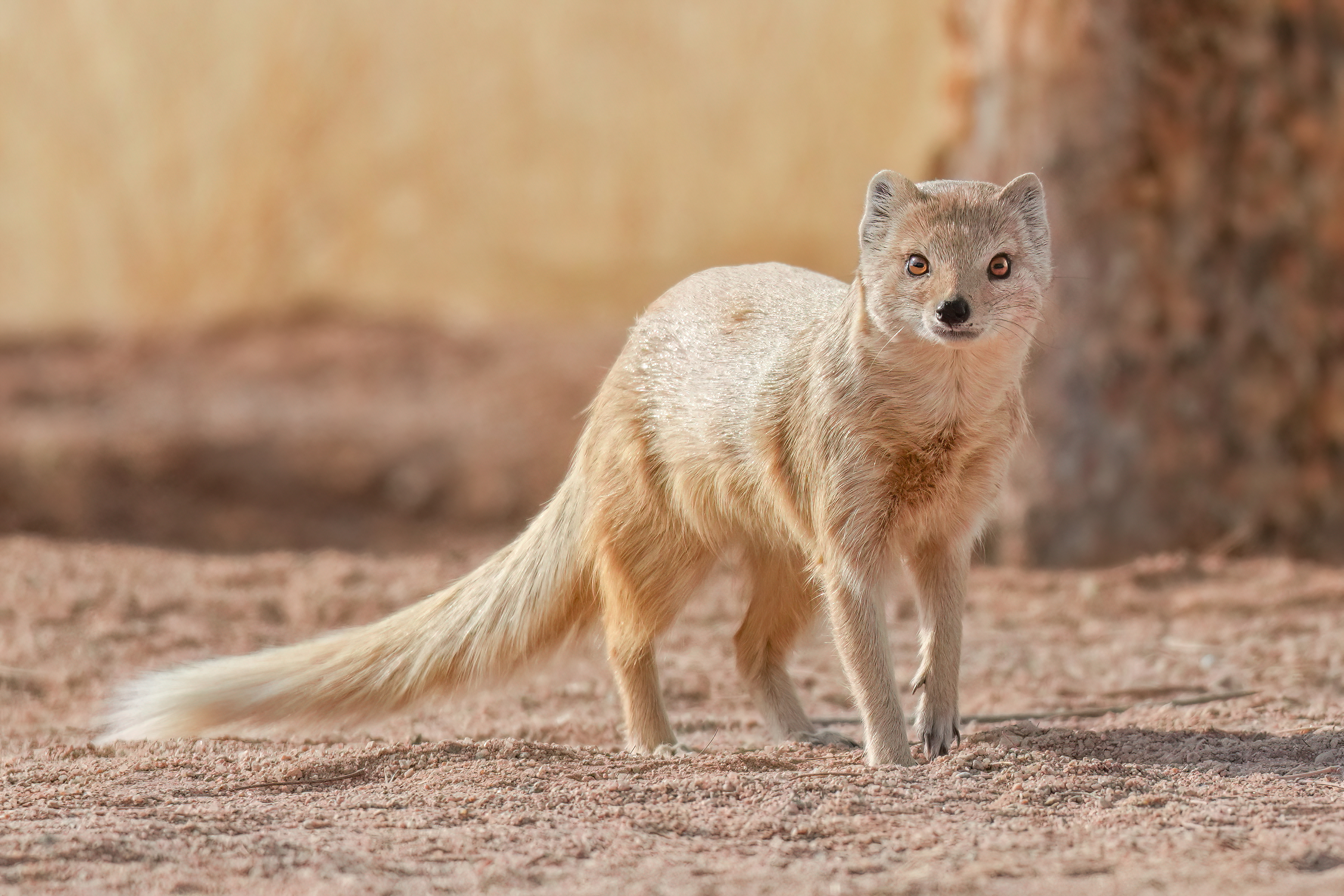
- Yellow mongoose in Khomas Region, Namibia

Conservation status
- Least Concern (IUCN 3.1)

Scientific classification
- Kingdom: Animalia
- Phylum: Chordata
- Class: Mammalia
- Order: Carnivora
- Family: Herpestidae
- Genus: Cynictis; Ogilby, 1833
- Species: C. penicillata

Binomial name
- Cynictis penicillata (Cuvier, 1829)
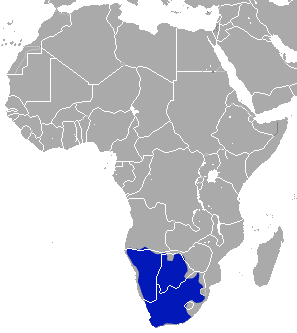
- Yellow mongoose range

= Yellow mongoose =

Species of mongoose in Africa

The yellow mongoose (Cynictis penicillata), sometimes referred to as the red meerkat, is a member of the mongoose family. It averages about 0.45 kg (1 lb) in weight and about 510 mm (20 in) in length. It lives in open country, semi-desert scrubland and grasslands in Angola, Botswana, South Africa, Namibia, and Zimbabwe. It is the only species in the genus Cynictis.

== Taxonomy ==
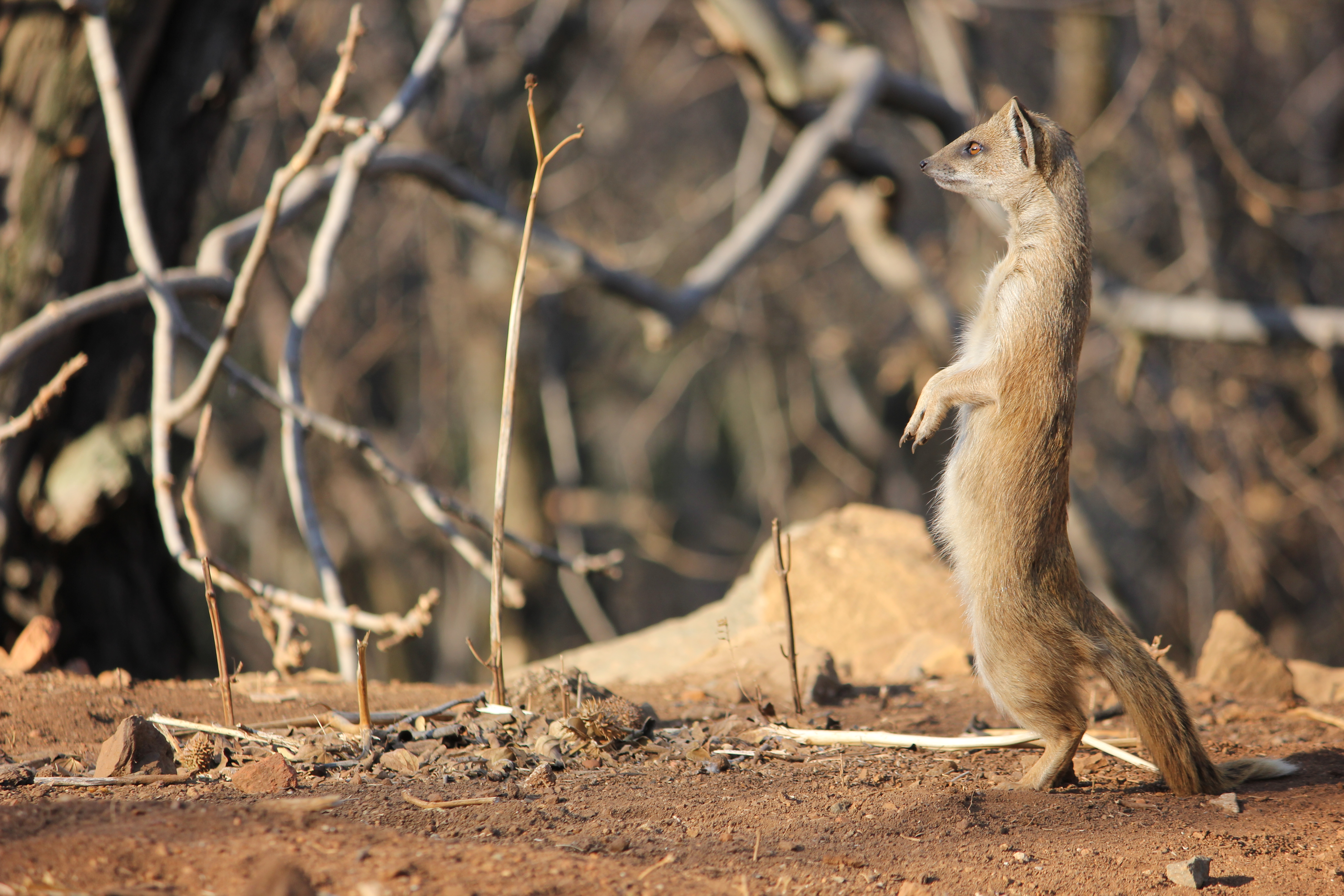

Herpestes penicillatus was the scientific name proposed by Georges Cuvier in 1829 for a mongoose specimen from the Cape. The generic name Cynictis was proposed by William Ogilby in 1833 for a specimen collected in Kaffraria.

The yellow mongoose is the only member of the genus Cynictis; 12 subspecies have been described, but their status is unclear. At least four subspecies have been recognised:

- Grizzled yellow mongoose (C. p. coombsi)
- Natal yellow mongoose (C. p. natalensis)
- Southern yellow mongoose (C. p. penicillata)

== Characteristics ==
In general, the yellow mongoose has lighter highlights on the underbelly and chin, a bushy tail, and a complete lack of sexual dimorphism. Southern yellow mongooses are larger, have yellow or reddish fur, longer fur, and a longer tail with a characteristic white tip. Northern subspecies tend towards smaller size, grey colouration, a grey or darker grey tip to the tail, and shorter hair more appropriate to the hotter climate.

== Behaviour and ecology ==
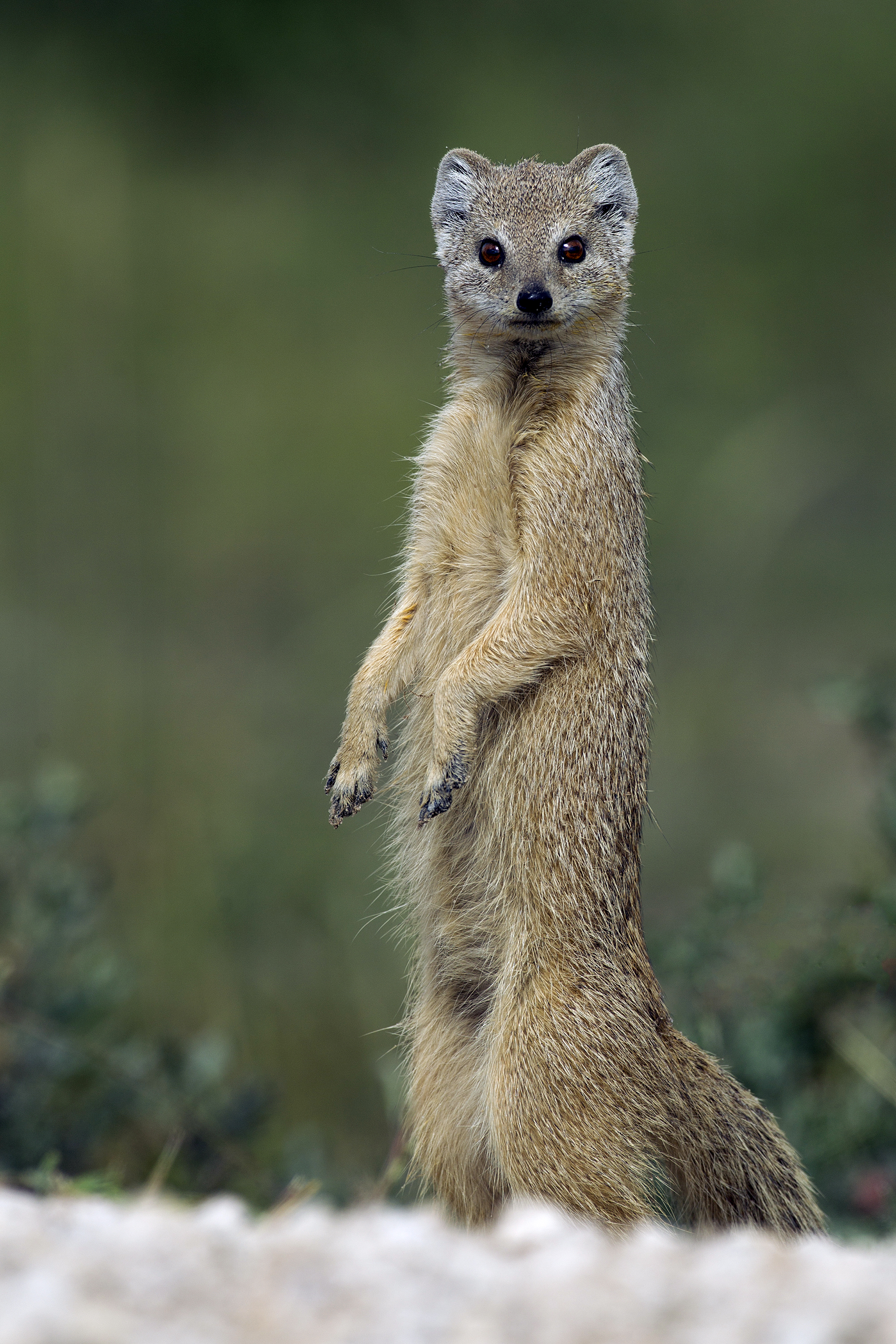
An adult yellow mongoose in Etosha

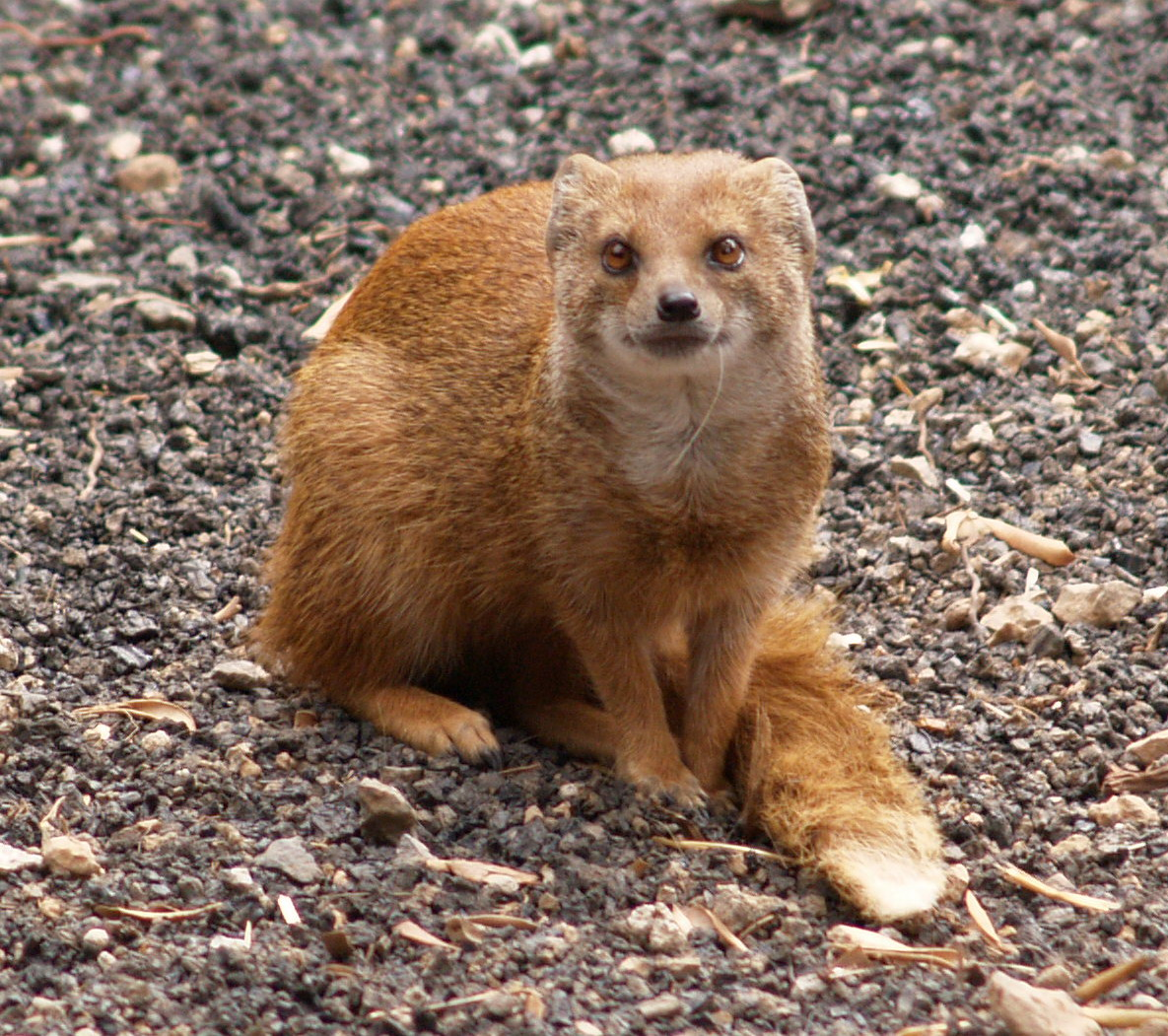
Yellow mongoose

The yellow mongoose is primarily diurnal, though nocturnal activity has been observed. Living in colonies of up to 20 individuals in a permanent burrow complex, the yellow mongoose will often co-exist with Cape ground squirrels or suricates and share maintenance of the warren, adding new tunnels and burrows as necessary. The tunnel system has many entrances, nearby which the yellow mongoose makes its latrines.

The yellow mongoose is a carnivore, feeding mostly on beetles, termites, grasshoppers, crickets, caterpillars, and ants, but also on rodents, small birds, reptiles, amphibians, carrion, eggs, grass, and seeds. In urban environments in South Africa, it also forages among human food garbage.

=== Social structure ===
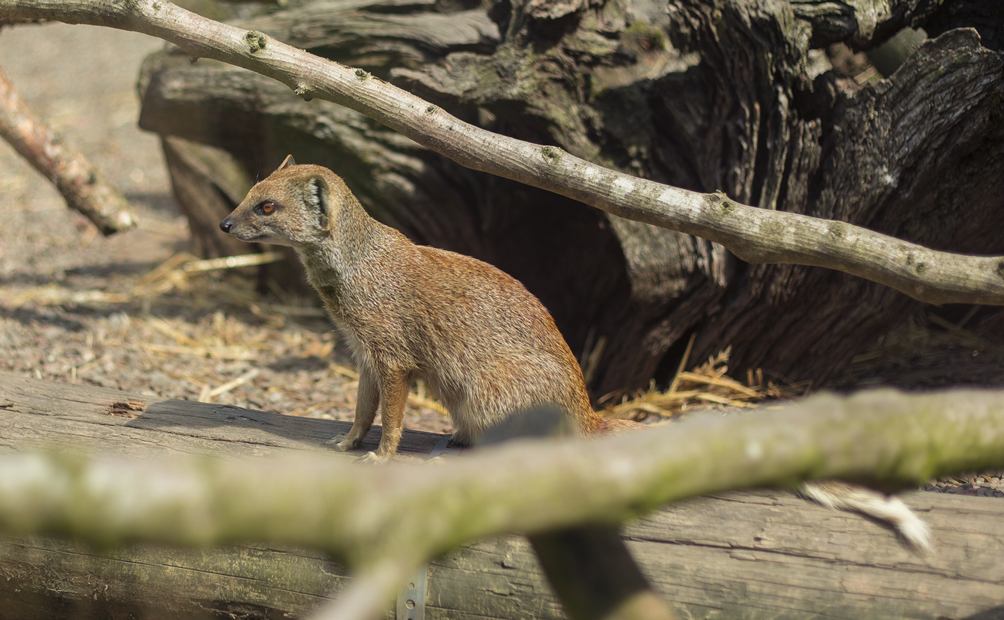
A yellow mongoose in Lake District Wildlife Park, Cumbria, northwestern England

The social structure of the yellow mongoose is hierarchical, based around a central breeding pair and their most recent offspring. There are also subadults, the elderly, or adult relatives of the central pair. Male ranges tend to overlap, while females from other dens have contiguous non-overlapping ranges. Every day, the alpha male will mark members of his group with anal gland secretions, and his boundaries with facial and anal secretions, as well as urine. The alpha male also rubs his back against raised objects, leaving behind hair as a visual marker of territory. Other members of the group mark their dens with cheek secretions. A colony can have 20-40 members.

=== Predators ===
Predators of the yellow mongoose are birds of prey, snakes and jackals. When frightened, the yellow mongoose will growl and secrete from its anal glands. It can also scream, bark, and purr, though these are exceptions, as the yellow mongoose is usually silent, and communicates mood and status through tail movements.

=== Reproduction ===
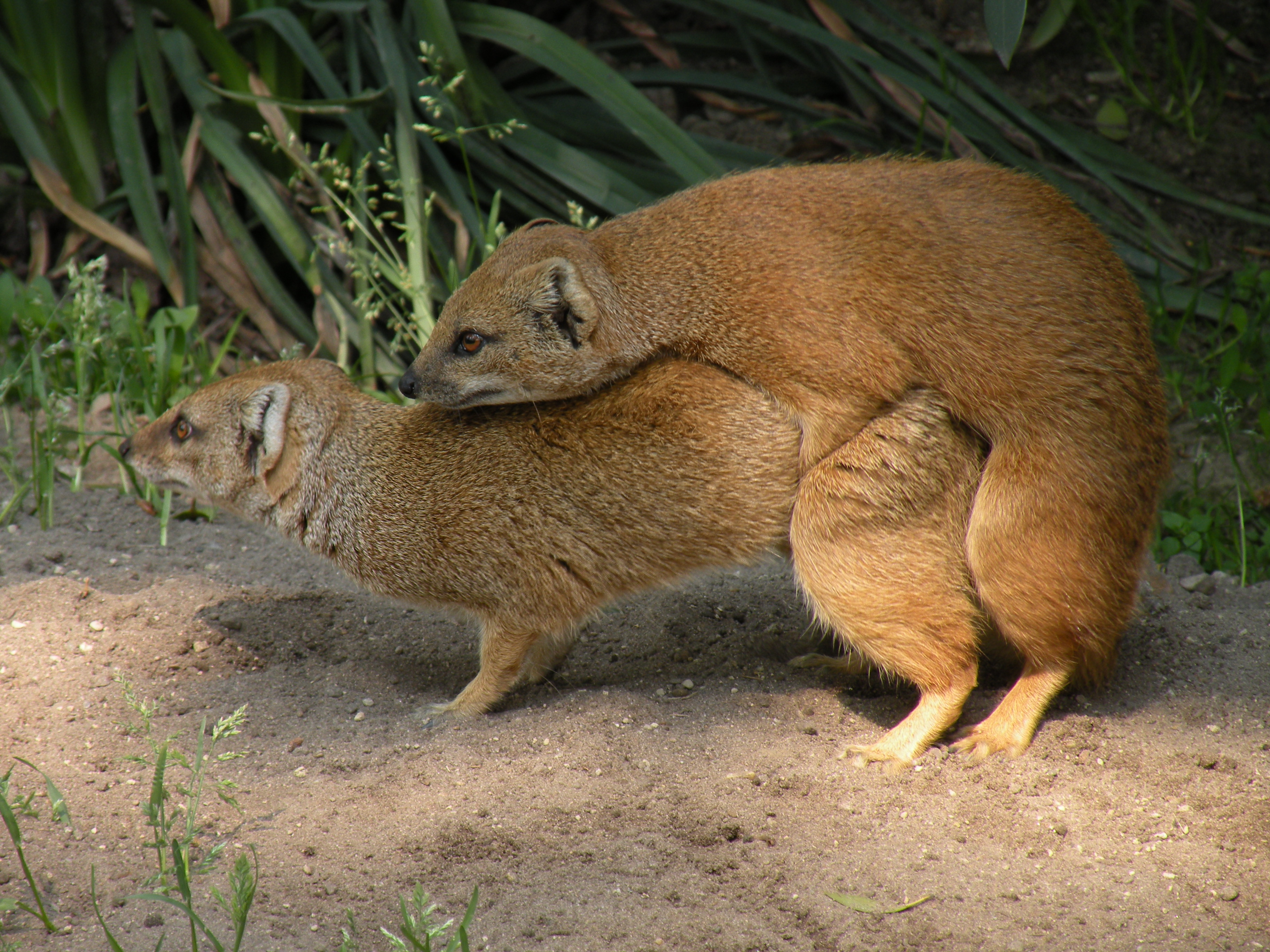
Yellow mongooses mating

The yellow mongoose's mating season is between July and September, and it gives birth underground between October and December, with no bedding material, in a clean chamber of the burrow system. Usually, two offspring are produced per pregnancy, and they are weaned at 10 weeks, reaching adult size after 10 months.

=== Rabies ===
There is some concern about the yellow mongoose's role as a natural reservoir of rabies. Most African wild animals die within several weeks of infection with rabies, but it seems that certain genetic strains of the yellow mongoose can carry it asymptomatically, but infectiously, for years.
