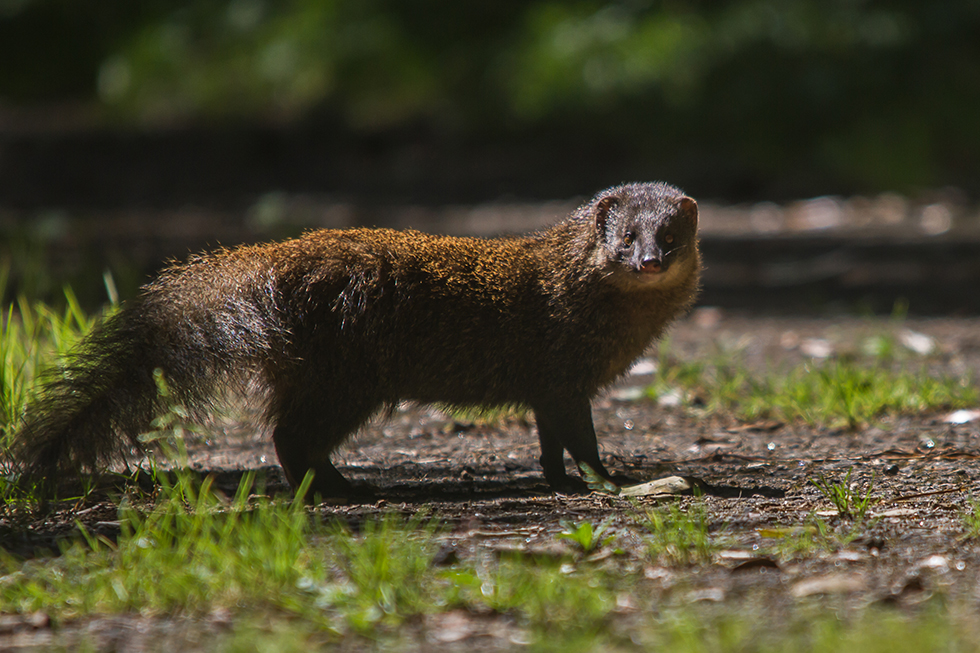
- Western Ghats, India

Conservation status
- Least Concern (IUCN 3.1)
- CITES Appendix III

Scientific classification
- Kingdom: Animalia
- Phylum: Chordata
- Class: Mammalia
- Infraclass: Placentalia
- Order: Carnivora
- Suborder: Feliformia
- Family: Herpestidae
- Genus: Urva
- Species: U. fusca

Binomial name
- Urva fusca Waterhouse, 1838
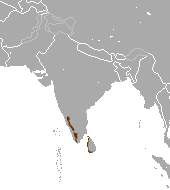
- Indian brown mongoose range

Synonyms
- Herpestes fuscus

= Indian brown mongoose =

Species of mongoose from South Asia

The Indian brown mongoose or brown mongoose (Urva fusca) is a mongoose species native to the Western Ghats in India and the western coast in Sri Lanka and introduced to Fiji. It is listed as least concern on the IUCN Red List.

== Characteristics ==
The Indian brown mongoose appears large compared to the other mongoose species in southern Western Ghats. This species has a dark brown body and its legs are noticeably in black colour. Head to body length is 33–48 cm. Tail is about 20–34 cm which is two-thirds of its body length and more furry than that of the small Indian mongoose. A pointed tail and fur beneath the hindleg help to distinguish this species from others. Males are larger and heavier than females with a weight of 2.7 kg. Young are much darker in color with yellowish eyes.

== Distribution and habitat ==
In South India, the Indian brown mongoose lives at an elevation range of 700–1,300 m (2,300–4,300 ft) from Virajpet in south Coorg and Ooty in the Nilgiri Hills, Tiger Shola in the Palni Hills, High Wavy Mountains in Madurai, Kalakad-Mundanthurai in Agasthyamalai Hills, Valparai plateau in the Anamalai Hills, and Peeramedu in Kerala. In Sri Lanka, the species is confined to west coast, central hills and western urban centers.

In the 1970s, it has been introduced to Fiji, where it lives in sympatry with the Javan mongoose.

== Behaviour and ecology ==
The Indian brown mongoose is nocturnal in nature, prefers to live in isolation, and maintains its habitats in dense forests. In Sri Lanka, it prefers jungle patches covered with ferns and brush to tea estates. Generally a shy animal that avoid human habitation, but sometimes enter suburban gardens to feed on snakes and mice. When threaten, it will flee to a hole or termitaria but make ferocious fight when cornered.

When ready to breed, Indian brown mongooses burrow in densely-packed rocks and give birth to two to three young. The brown mongoose is opportunistic carnivore, feeding primarily on small rodents, snakes, lizards, spiders, grubs, birds, eggs, frogs and at times also on berries and flowers. During hunting, it stops motionless to detect sound emitted by the prey and quickly pounce on the prey with a bite to head.

Parturition is usually in a burrowing dug well concealed embankment or underneath a rock or an anthill. Female gives birth to three to four pups in any time of the year.

== Taxonomy ==
Herpestes fuscus was the scientific name proposed by George Robert Waterhouse in 1838 for a greyish brown mongoose skin that had been purchased in Madras. All Asian mongooses are now thought to belong in the genus Urva.
