= Eugène de Pousargues =

French zoologist

Eugène de Pousargues (21 October 1859 – 24 January 1901) was a French zoologist born in Saint-Omer (Pas-de-Calais).

From 1885 he was an assistant to Alphonse Milne-Edwards (1835–1900), and served as préparateur at the Laboratoire de Mammalogie of the Muséum national d'histoire naturelle in Paris. He died of septicaemia contracted when performing a dissection.

He was the author of a treatise on mammals from the French Congo titled "Étude sur les mammifères du Congo français" (1897), and with Milne-Edwards, he was co-author of "Le rhinopithèque de la vallée du Haut Mékong (rhinopithecus bieti, A. M.-E.)", (The snub-nosed monkey from the valley of the Upper Mekong River; 1898). He also published scientific papers on Thorold's deer, the black-footed mongoose and on new gibbon and guenon species.

An African carnivore known as Pousargues's mongoose, Dologale dybowskii (Pousargues, 1893), is named after him.
