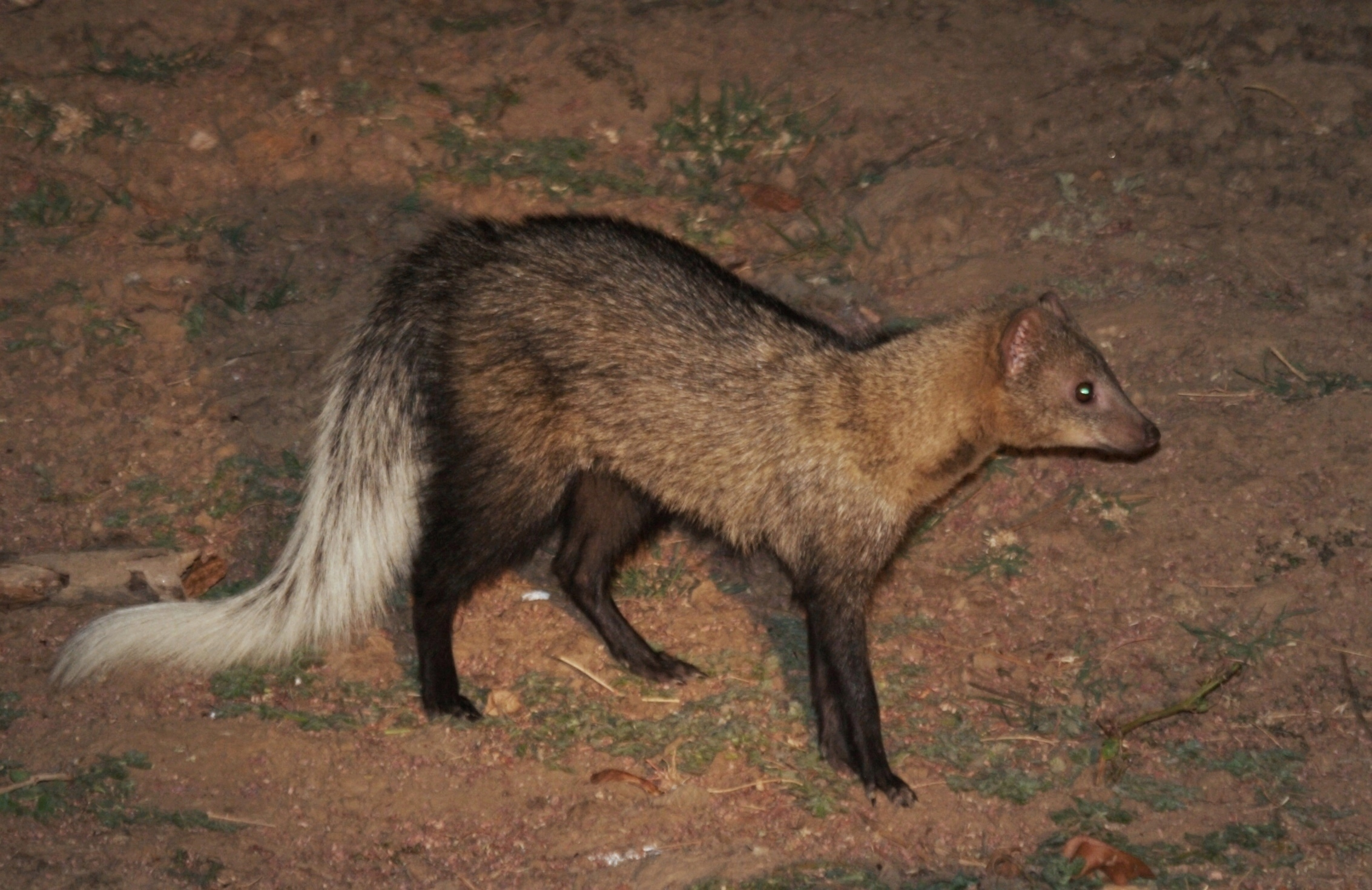

Conservation status
- Least Concern (IUCN 3.1)

Scientific classification
- Kingdom: Animalia
- Phylum: Chordata
- Class: Mammalia
- Infraclass: Placentalia
- Order: Carnivora
- Suborder: Feliformia
- Family: Herpestidae
- Genus: Ichneumia; I. Geoffroy Saint-Hilaire, 1837
- Species: I. albicauda

Binomial name
- Ichneumia albicauda (G. Cuvier, 1829)

Subspecies
- I. a. albicauda; I. a. dialeucos; I. a. grandis; I. a. haagneri; I. a. ibeanus; I. a. loandae; I. a. loempo
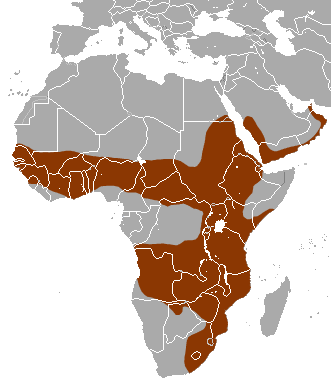
- range of the white-tailed mongoose

= White-tailed mongoose =

Species of mongoose from Africa

The white-tailed mongoose (Ichneumia albicauda) is a species in the mongoose family Herpestidae. It is the only member of the genus Ichneumia.

== Taxonomy ==
Herpestes albicaudus was the scientific name proposed by Georges Cuvier in 1829 for a mongoose specimen with a white tail from Senegal. The genus name Ichneumia was coined by Isidore Geoffroy Saint-Hilaire in 1837.

== Characteristics ==
The white-tailed mongoose attains a weight range of 1.8 to 5.2 kg (4.0 to 11.5 lb), with an average of approximately 3.38 kg (7.5 lb), has a head-and-body length of 53 to 71 cm (21 to 28 in) and a tail length of 40 to 47 cm (16 to 19 in). On average it appears to be the longest and heaviest extant species of mongoose, although its linear and body mass parameters broadly overlap with other larger mongoose species, in particular, the marsh mongoose seems to most closely rival (and possibly match) in range of body masses reported if not average weight. Its legs are relatively long for a mongoose. The head is long and narrow. Its large, rounded ears are set low on the sides of the head. It has a yellow to tan coloration on its body, with long black guard hairs, giving it an overall grizzled grey appearance. Distal from the tibiofemoral joint, the legs are black. The base of the large, bushy tail is brownish yellow, and on its distal half, and the tail is white as its name suggests. This appendage may comprise up to 40% of the creature's body length. This species lacks hair on its upper lip and on the forepaws. Females have four teats.

== Distribution and habitat ==
The white-tailed mongoose lives in most of Africa south of the Sahara, and the southern portion of the Arabian Peninsula. It lives in a wide range of habitats, from semi-desert to savanna woodland, but avoid moist areas like the Congo River basin or extremely arid areas. It prefers areas of thick cover, such as the edges of forests and brushy streams.

In the East Sudanian Savanna, it was recorded in the transboundary Dinder–Alatash protected area complex during surveys between 2015 and 2018. Further northeast, it is also frequent in the Degua Tembien massif.

== Behaviour and ecology ==
The white-tailed mongoose is primarily nocturnal and terrestrial. By day they will rest in an abandoned burrow, termite mound, or in cavities under tree roots. The average home range is 0.97 km^{2} (0.37 sq mi) for males and 0.64 km^{2} (0.25 sq mi) for females. Ranges of males do not overlap, but ranges of opposite sexes overlap significantly. Females either live alone with their own offspring or in a small group with other females and their offspring, although they do not associate with each other. Though they may share a range, they forage separately. They are, for the most part, solitary creatures, with the male and female only coming together to mate. Reports of groups are either a breeding pair or a mother and her offspring. These mongooses do not migrate except to establish their own territory away from their mother's range.

These mongooses are very vocal, and make an unusual barking sound that is associated with sexual behavior. To ward off predators (such as humans and possibly large snakes and large birds of prey), they will secrete a noxious substance from their anal glands. They do not stand on their hind feet for any length of time like other mongooses.

== Diet ==
The white-tailed mongoose feeds mostly on insects, but will feed on a wide variety of other foods as well. Locusts, beetles, and mole crickets make up the majority of their diet. Rats, mice, shrews, lizards, snakes, small birds are also eaten, along with the occasional fruits and berries. The eggs of birds are also eaten; they will break open the egg by throwing it between its hind legs against a rock or other hard object. They have been known to raid chicken houses in areas where domestic poultry is raised.

== Reproduction ==
Knowledge of the reproduction of the white tailed mongoose is incomplete. Litters are seen most frequently from February to May, and no young appear at all during the dry season from August to November, which suggests that they only breed once a year. The young are fully weaned at nine months of age, and around this time, the young disperse. It is speculated that sexual maturity is reached before two years of age, and that the gestation period is around 60 days.

== Etymology ==
The genus name, Ichneumia, is derived from the Greek ichneumon, which means 'tracker'. This name also happens to be the species and common name for the Egyptian mongoose (Herpestes ichneumon). The species name, albicauda, is derived from the Latin words albus, meaning 'white', and cauda, which means 'tail'.

=== Local and indigenous names ===
In Tigrinya language, it is called ፂሒራ (tsihira).
