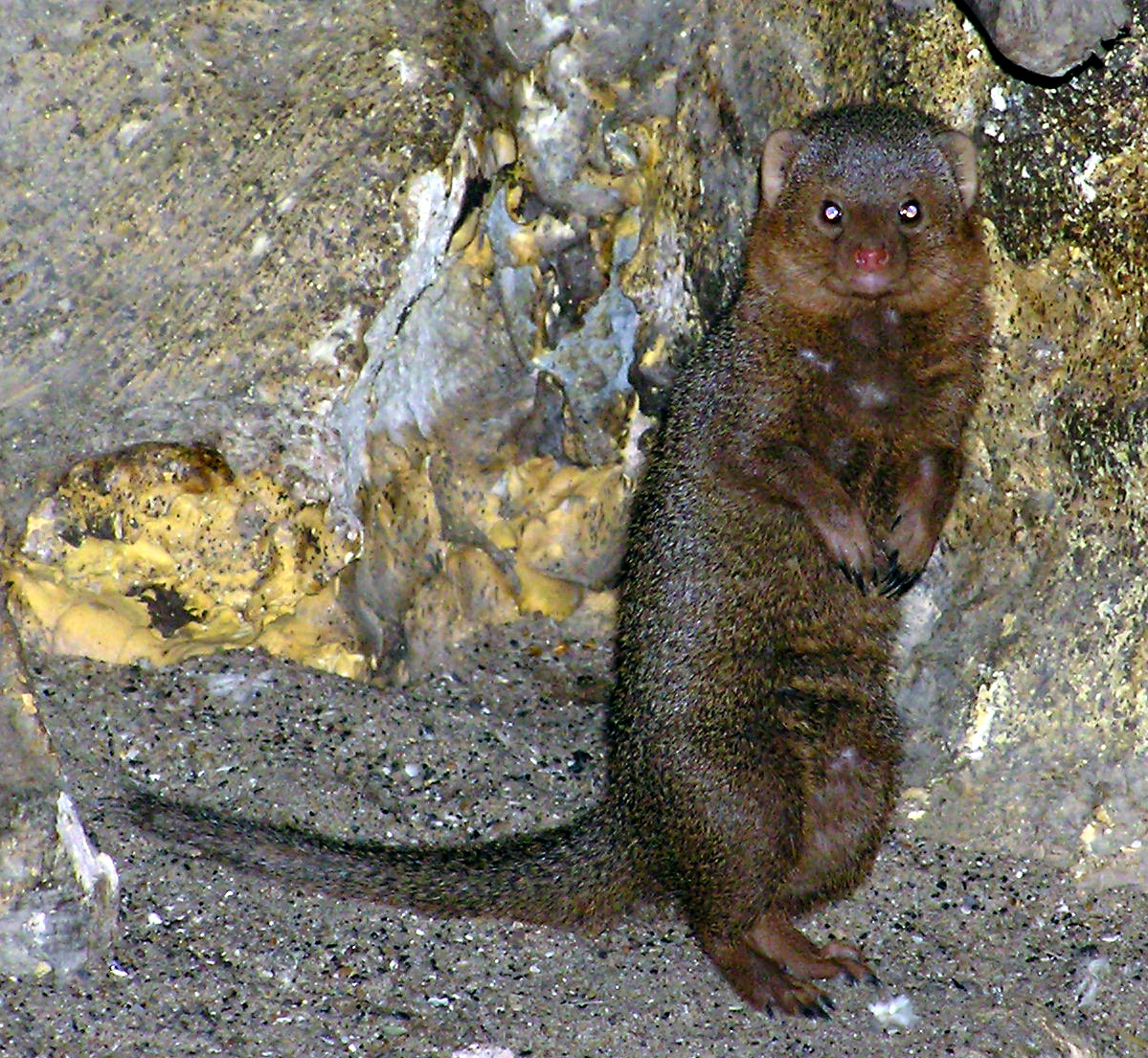

Scientific classification
- Domain: Eukaryota
- Kingdom: Animalia
- Phylum: Chordata
- Class: Mammalia
- Order: Carnivora
- Suborder: Feliformia
- Family: Herpestidae
- Subfamily: Mungotinae
- Genus: Helogale; Gray, 1861

Type species
- Herpestes parvulus Sundevall, 1847

Species
- Helogale hirtula; Helogale parvula
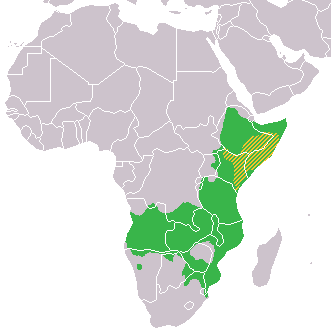
- Helogale ranges

= Helogale =

Dwarf mongoose

Genus of carnivores

Helogale is a genus of the mongoose family (Herpestidae). It consists of two species and 12 subspecies:

== Extant Species ==
Genus Helogale – Gray, 1861 – two species
Common name	Scientific name and subspecies	Range	Size and ecology	IUCN status and estimated population
Ethiopian dwarf mongoose	Helogale hirtula Thomas, 1904 Five subspecies: H. h. hirtula; H. h. ahlselli; H. h. annulata; H. h. lutescens; H. h. powelli	eastern Africa, particularly Ethiopia, Kenya, and Somalia.	Size: Habitat: Diet:	LC
Common dwarf mongoose	Helogale parvula Sundevall, 1847 Seven subspecies: H. p. parvula; H. p. ivori; H. p. mimetra; H. p. nero; H. p. ruficeps; H. p. undulatus; H. p. varia	East to southern Central Africa, from Eritrea and Ethiopia to the provinces of Limpopo and Mpumalanga in the Republic of South Africa.	Size: Habitat: Diet:	LC

The helogales are the smallest species of mongooses and both are endemic to Africa. The distribution of the Ethiopian dwarf mongoose is more tropical, and overlaps completely with that of the common dwarf mongoose, which is more widespread. Both are social diurnal species, and due to their small sizes they are vulnerable to predation. Both species live independently of open water.
