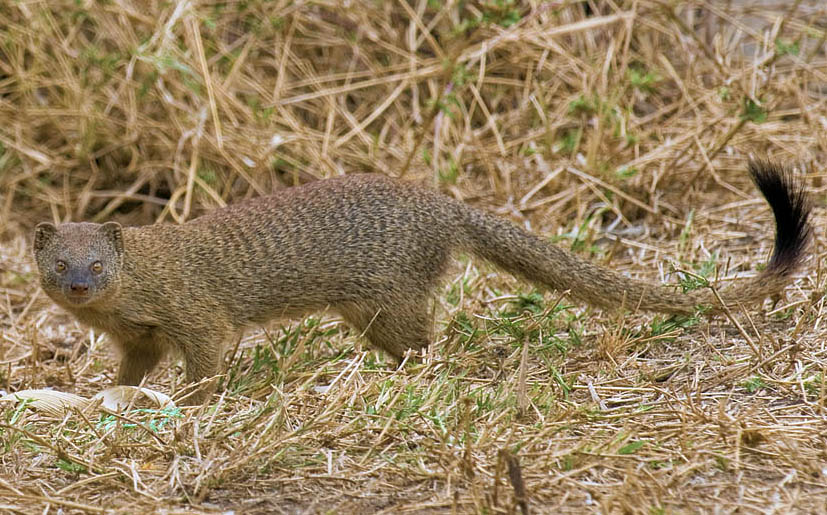
- Common slender mongoose in Serengeti National Park, Tanzania

Conservation status
- Least Concern (IUCN 3.1)

Scientific classification
- Kingdom: Animalia
- Phylum: Chordata
- Class: Mammalia
- Order: Carnivora
- Family: Herpestidae
- Genus: Herpestes
- Species: H. sanguineus

Binomial name
- Herpestes sanguineus Rüppell, 1835
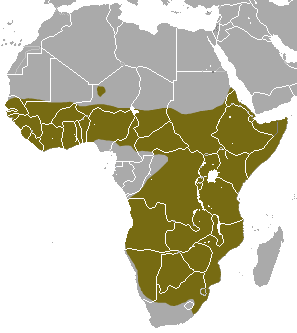
- native range

Synonyms
- List: Galerella sanguinea (Rüppell, 1836); Herpestes sanguineus Rüppell, 1835; Galerella sanguinea canus (Wroughton, 1907); Galerella sanguinea cauui (A. Smith, 1836); Galerella sanguinea dasilvai (Roberts, 1938); Galerella sanguinea dentifer (Heller, 1913); Mungos dentifer Heller, 1913; Galerella sanguinea galbus (Wroughton, 1909); Galerella sanguinea gracilis (Rüppell, 1835); Herpestes gracilis Rüppell, 1836; Galerella sanguinea grantii (Gray, 1865); Galerella sanguinea ibeae (Wroughton, 1907); Galerella sanguinea ignitus (Roberts, 1913); Galerella sanguinea lancasteri (Roberts, 1932); Galerella sanguinea melanura (Martin, 1836); Galerella sanguinea mossambica (Matschie, 1914); Galerella sanguinea mustela Schwarz, 1935; Galerella sanguinea mutgigella (Rüppell, 1835); Herpestes mutgigella Rüppell, 1836; Galerella sanguinea orestes (Heller, 1911); Galerella sanguinea parvipes (Hollister, 1916); Galerella sanguinea phoenicurus (Thomas, 1912); Galerella sanguinea proteus (Thomas, 1907); Galerella sanguinea rendilis (Lönnberg, 1912); Galerella sanguinea saharae (Thomas, 1925); Galerella sanguinea sanguinea (Rüppell, 1835); Galerella sanguinea swalius (Thomas, 1926); Galerella swalius (Thomas, 1926); Galerella sanguinea swinnyi (Roberts, 1913); Galerella sanguinea ugandae (Wroughton, 1909)

= Common slender mongoose =

Species of mongoose from Africa

The common slender mongoose (Herpestes sanguineus), also known as the black-tipped mongoose, the black-tailed mongoose, or just the slender mongoose is a very common mongoose species native to sub-Saharan Africa.

== Taxonomy ==
The scientific name Herpestes sanguineus was proposed by Eduard Rüppell in 1835 who described a reddish mongoose observed in the Kordofan region.

== Description ==
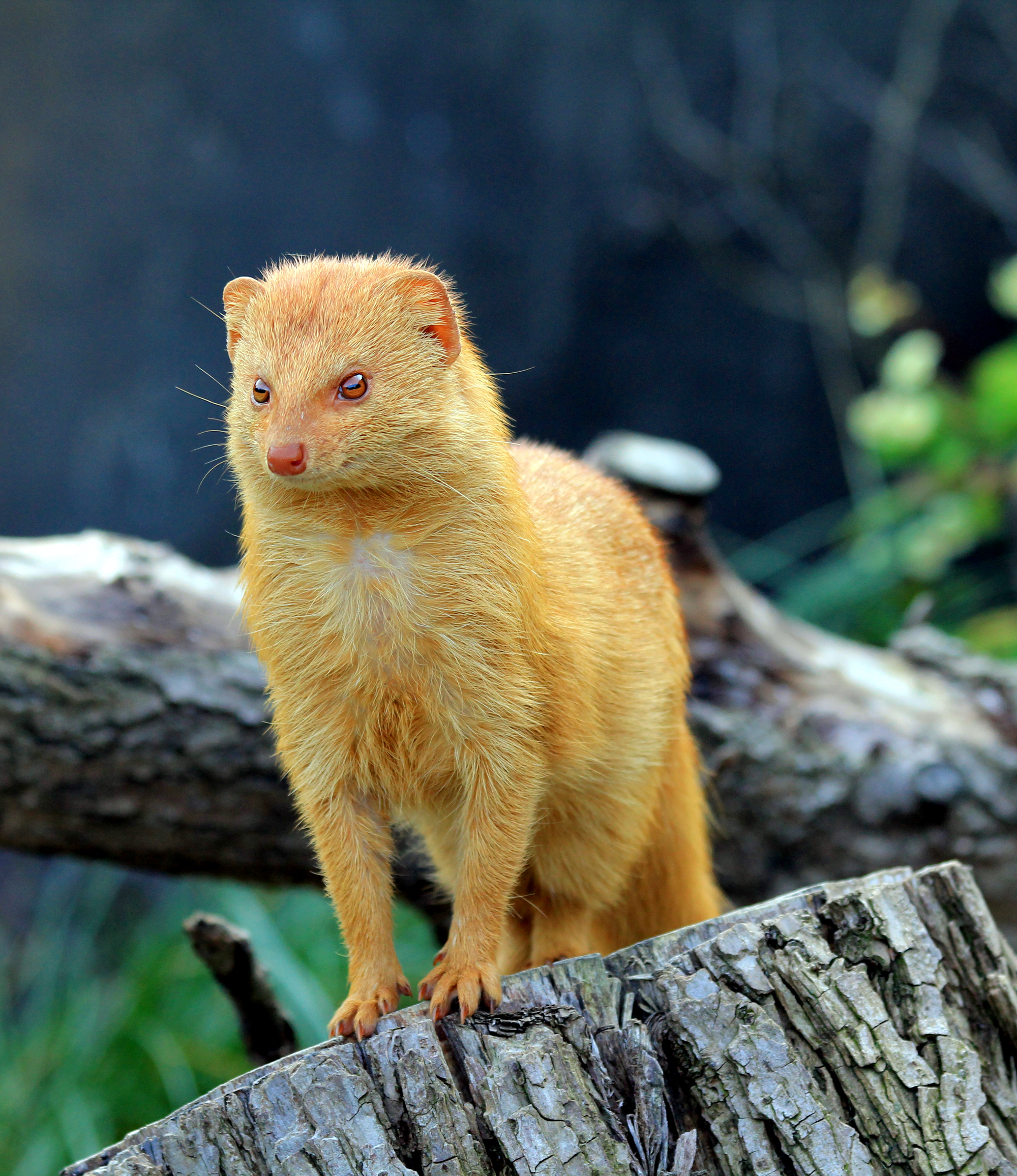
Slender mongoose in the Prague Zoo, Czech Republic

As the name suggests, the common slender mongoose has a lithe body of 27.5–40 cm (10.8–15.7 in) and a long tail of 23–33 cm (9.1–13.0 in). Males weigh 640–715 g (22.6–25.2 oz), while the smaller females weigh 460–575 g (16.2–20.3 oz). These measurements are consistent with the average measurements given by Rood and Wozencraft.

The color of their fur varies widely between subspecies, from a dark reddish-brown to an orange red, grey, or even golden yellow, but these mongooses can be distinguished from other mongooses due to the prominent black or red tip on their tails. They also have silkier fur than the other African members of their family.

== Distribution and habitat ==
The common slender mongoose occurs throughout sub-Saharan Africa, where it is most common in the savannah and semiarid plains, but rarely recorded in densely forested areas and deserts.

== Behavior and ecology ==
The common slender mongoose is often described as solitary, but when studied in the Kalahari in South Africa, were found to form spatial groups of one to three males and up to four females, denning together up to one third of nights.

It is primarily diurnal, although it is sometimes active on warm, moonlit nights. It doesn't seem to be territorial, but will nevertheless maintain stable home ranges that are often shared with members of related species. Indeed, the common slender mongoose and these other species may even den together, as most of their relatives are nocturnal. Dens may be found anywhere sheltered from the elements: in crevices between rocks, in hollow logs, and the like.

=== Reproduction ===
A male's range includes the ranges of several females, and scent cues inform him when the female is in heat. The gestation period is believed to be 60 to 70 days, and most pregnancies result in one to three young. The male does not help care for them. Unusually, for a solitary species, in the Kalahari Desert the males are philopatric whereas the females disperse.

=== Feeding ===
The common slender mongoose is primarily carnivorous, though it is an opportunistic omnivore. Insects make up the bulk of its diet, but lizards, rodents, snakes, birds, amphibians, and the occasional fruit are eaten when available. It will also eat carrion and eggs. As befits the popular image of mongooses, the slender mongoose is capable of killing and subsequently eating venomous snakes, but such snakes do not constitute a significant portion of its diet.

Common slender mongooses are more adept at climbing trees than other mongooses, often hunting birds there. White browed-sparrow weavers, crimson breasted shrikes, and glossy starlings are considered common prey.

Diet often changes during seasons where certain sources of food become less available. Insects are more likely to be consumed in during wet-months whereas larger prey is consumed during dry-months. This adaptability aids the slender common mongoose's ability to survive when changes in habitat occur.

== Conservation ==
The common slender mongoose has been targeted by extermination efforts in the past, due to its potential to be a rabies vector and the fact that it sometimes kills domestic poultry. These efforts have not been conspicuously successful, although some subspecies may be threatened. It is in no immediate danger of extinction, and is IUCN Red Listed as least concern.
