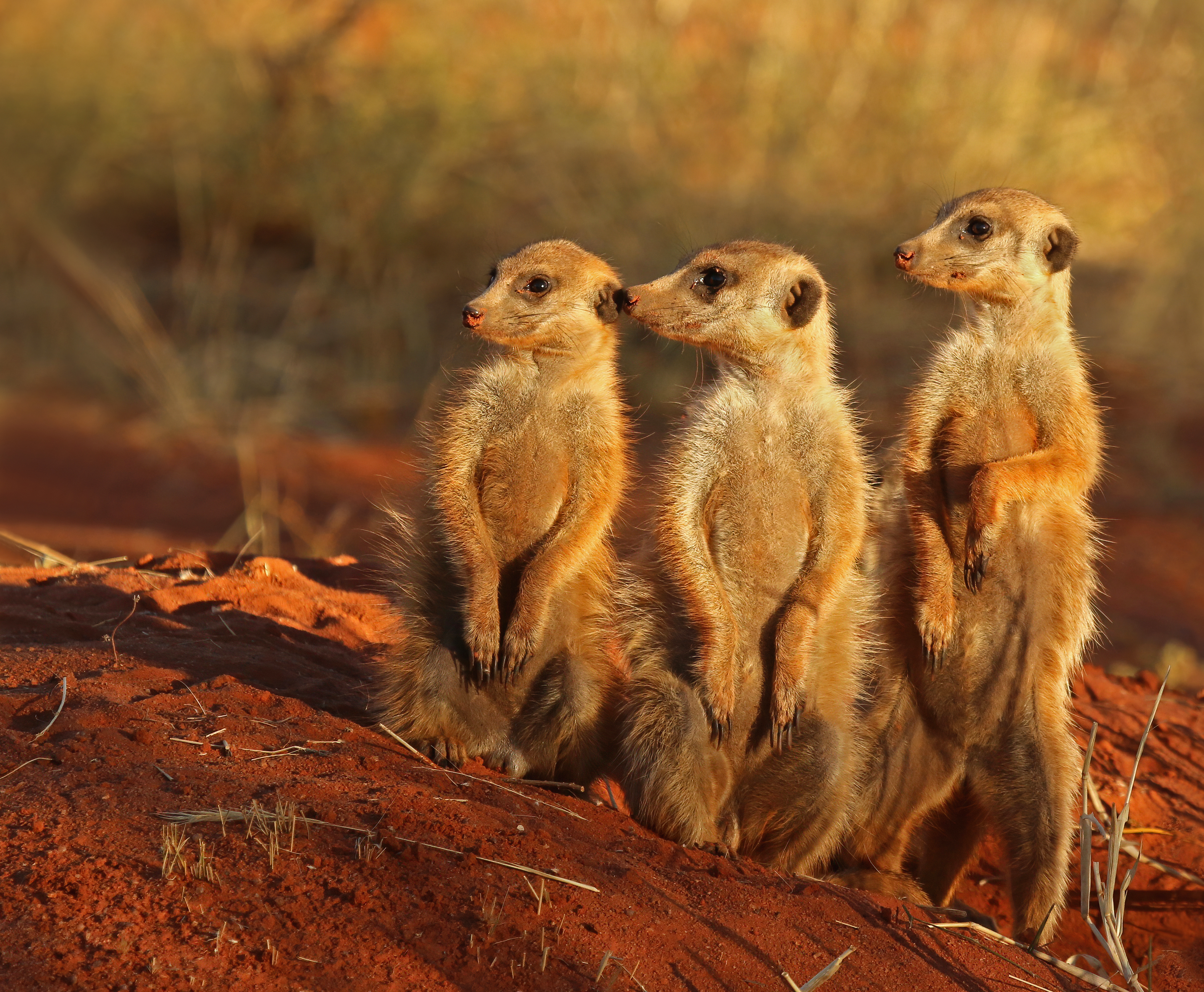
- A mob of meerkats in Tswalu Kalahari Reserve

Conservation status
- Least Concern (IUCN 3.1)

Scientific classification
- Kingdom: Animalia
- Phylum: Chordata
- Class: Mammalia
- Order: Carnivora
- Family: Herpestidae
- Genus: Suricata
- Species: S. suricatta

Binomial name
- Suricata suricatta (Schreber, 1776)

Subspecies
- List: S. s. suricatta (Schreber, 1776); S. s. majoriae Bradfield, 1936; S. s. iona Crawford-Cabral, 1971
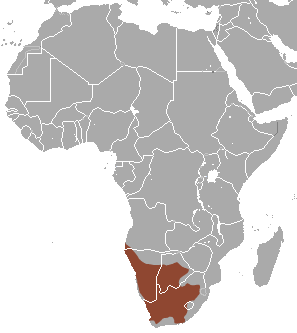
- native range

Synonyms
- List: Rhyzaena Wagner, 1841; Viverra suricatta Schreber, 1776; V. tetradactyla Pallas, 1777; Mus zenik Scopoli, 1786; Suricata capensis Desmarest, 1804; S. viverrina Desmarest, 1819; S. namaquensis (Thomas and Schwann, 1905); S. hamiltoni (Thomas and Schwann, 1905); S. lophurus (Thomas and Schwann, 1905); S. hahni (Thomas, 1927); S. majoriae Bradfield, 1936

= Meerkat =

Meerkat Temporal range: Early Pleistocene–Recent

Species of mongoose from Southern Africa

The meerkat (Suricata suricatta) or suricate is a small mongoose found in southern Africa. It is characterised by a broad head, large eyes, a pointed snout, long legs, a thin tapering tail, and a brindled coat pattern. The head-and-body length is around 24–35 cm (9.4–13.8 in), and the weight is typically between 0.62 and 0.97 kg (1.4 and 2.1 lb). The coat is light grey to yellowish-brown with alternate, poorly defined light and dark bands on the back. Meerkats have foreclaws adapted for digging and have the ability to thermoregulate to survive in their harsh, dry habitat. Three subspecies are recognised.

Meerkats are highly social, and form packs of two to 30 individuals each that occupy home ranges around 5 km^{2} (1.9 sq mi) in area. There is a social hierarchy—generally dominant individuals in a pack breed and produce offspring, and the nonbreeding, subordinate members provide altruistic care to the pups. Breeding occurs around the year, with peaks during heavy rainfall; after a gestation of 60 to 70 days, a litter of three to seven pups is born.

They live in rock crevices in stony, often calcareous areas, and in large burrow systems in plains. The burrow systems, typically 5 m (16 ft) in diameter with around 15 openings, are large underground networks consisting of two to three levels of tunnels. These tunnels are around 7.5 cm (3.0 in) high at the top and wider below, and extend up to 1.5 m (5 ft) into the ground. Burrows have moderated internal temperatures and provide a comfortable microclimate that protects meerkats in harsh weather and at extreme temperatures.

Meerkats are active during the day, mostly in the early morning and late afternoon; they remain continuously alert and retreat to burrows when sensing danger. They use a wide variety of calls to communicate among themselves for various purposes, such as to raise an alarm on sighting a predator. Primarily insectivorous, meerkats feed heavily on beetles and lepidopterans, arthropods, amphibians, small birds, reptiles, and plants.

Commonly living in arid, open habitats with little woody vegetation, meerkats occur in southwestern Botswana, western and southern Namibia, and northern and western South Africa; the range barely extends into southwestern Angola. With no significant threats to the population, the meerkat is listed as Least Concern on the IUCN Red List. Meerkats are widely depicted in television, movies, and other media.

== Etymology ==
The word meerkat derives from the Afrikaans language. The origin of the name is uncertain, giving rise to a number of theories, including:

- The provincial Dutch / colloquial Afrikaans word mier meaning 'ant' and kat, which means 'cat', hence an 'ant cat' referring to the meerkat's preying on ants and termites.
- A Dutch name for a kind of monkey, proposed to come from the Old High German mericazza and to be related to the similar Hindi term मर्कट (markat, 'monkey'), deriving from Sanskrit. The Germanic origin of the word, though, long predates any known connections to India. The name was used for small mammals in South Africa from 1801 onward, possibly because the Dutch colonialists used the name in reference to many burrowing animals.

In Afrikaans, the meerkat is called graatjiemeerkat or stokstertmeerkat; the term mierkatte or meerkatte can refer to both the meerkat and the yellow mongoose (rooimeerkat).

== Taxonomy ==
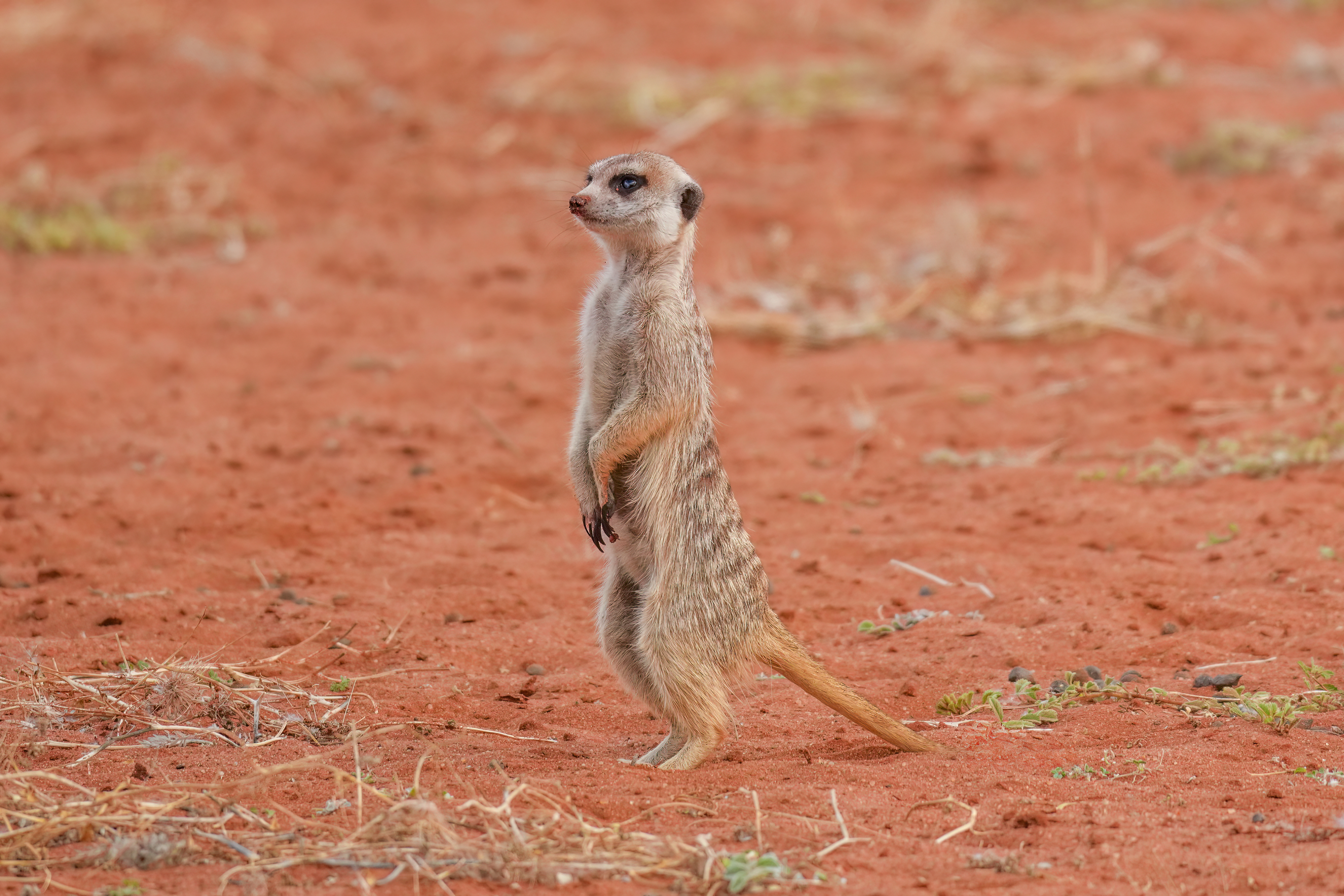
Meerkat standing in the Kalahari desert of Namibia

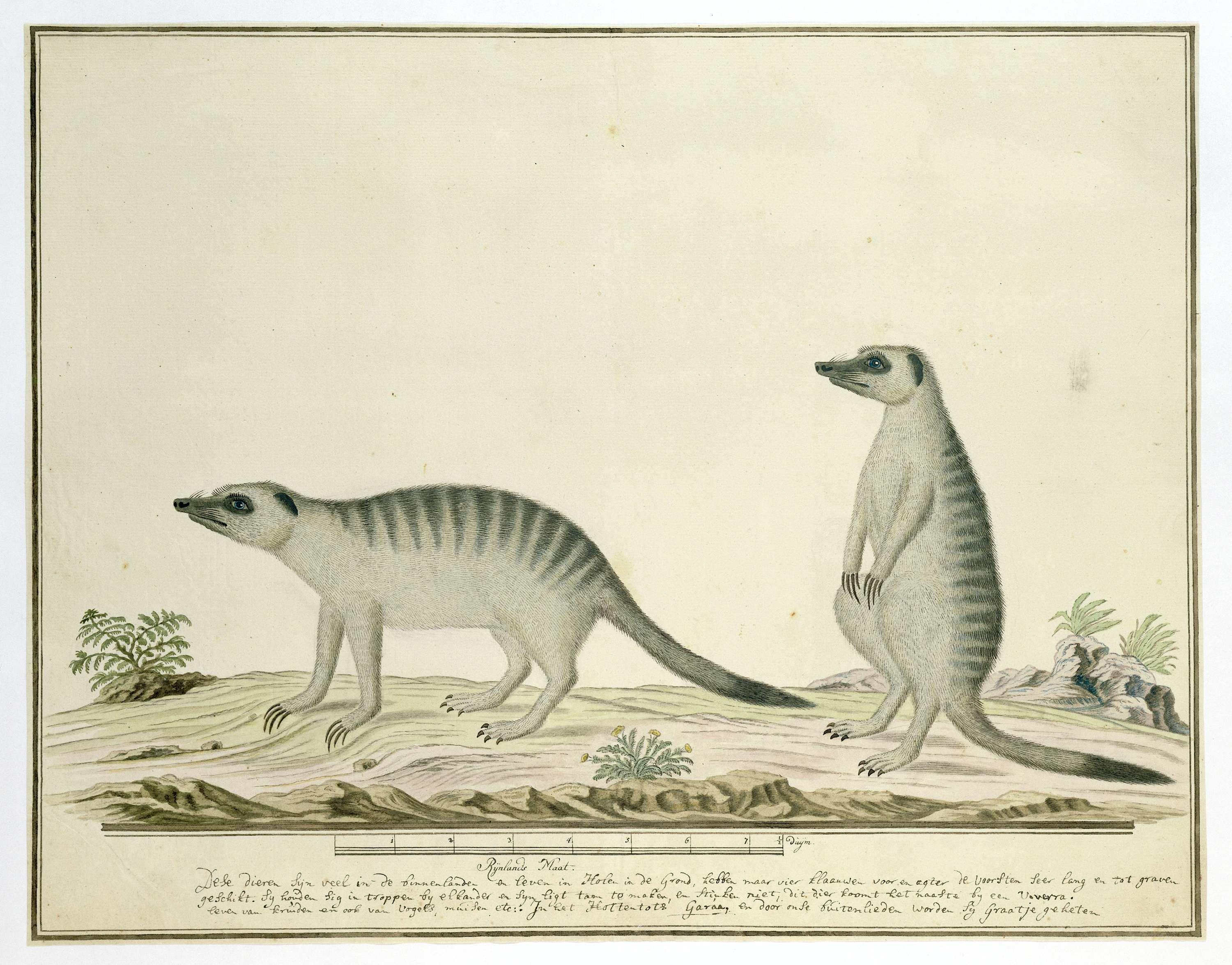
Illustration of meerkats by Robert Jacob Gordon (1777)

In 1776, Johann Christian Daniel von Schreber described a meerkat from the Cape of Good Hope, giving it the scientific name Viverra suricatta. The generic name Suricata was proposed by Anselme Gaëtan Desmarest in 1804, who also described a zoological specimen from the Cape of Good Hope. The present scientific name Suricata suricatta was first used by Oldfield Thomas and Harold Schwann in 1905 when they described a specimen collected at Wakkerstroom. They suggested there were four local meerkat races in the Cape and Deelfontein, Grahamstown, Orange River Colony and southern Transvaal, and Klipfontein respectively. Several zoological specimens were described between the late 18th and 20th centuries, of which three are recognised as valid subspecies:

- S. s. suricatta (Schreber, 1776) occurs in southern Namibia, southern Botswana, and South Africa.
- S. s. majoriae Bradfield, 1936 occurs in central and northwestern Namibia.
- S. s. iona Crawford-Cabral, 1971 occurs in southwestern Angola.

== Phylogeny and evolution ==
Meerkat fossils dating back to 2.59 to 0.01 million years ago have been excavated in various locations in South Africa. A 2009 phylogenetic study of the family Herpestidae suggests it split into two lineages around the Early Miocene (25.4–18.2 mya)—eusocial and solitary mongooses. The meerkat belongs to the monophyletic eusocial mongoose clade along with several other African mongooses: Crossarchus (kusimanse), Helogale (dwarf mongoose), Liberiictis (Liberian mongoose) and Mungos (banded mongoose). The solitary mongoose lineage comprises two clades, including species such as Meller's mongoose (Rhynchogale melleri) and the yellow mongoose (Cynictis penicillata). The meerkat genetically diverged from the rest of the clade 22.6–15.6 mya. The phylogenetic relationships of the meerkat are depicted as follows:

- Herpestidae
  - eusocial
    - - Meerkat (Suricata suricatta)
      - - - Banded mongoose (Mungos mungo)
          - Liberian mongoose (Liberiictis kuhni)
        - - Helogale
            - Common dwarf mongoose (Helogale parvula)
            - Ethiopian dwarf mongoose (Helogale hirtula)
          - Crossarchus
            - Common kusimanse (Crossarchus obscurus)
            - Alexander's kusimanse (Crossarchus alexandri)
  - solitary
    - Ichneumia, Cynictis, Paracynictis, Rhynchogale, Bdeogale, Galerella and Egyptian mongoose (Herpestes ichneumon)
    - Asian Herpestes, long-nosed mongoose (H. naso) and marsh mongoose (Atilax paludinosus)

== Characteristics ==
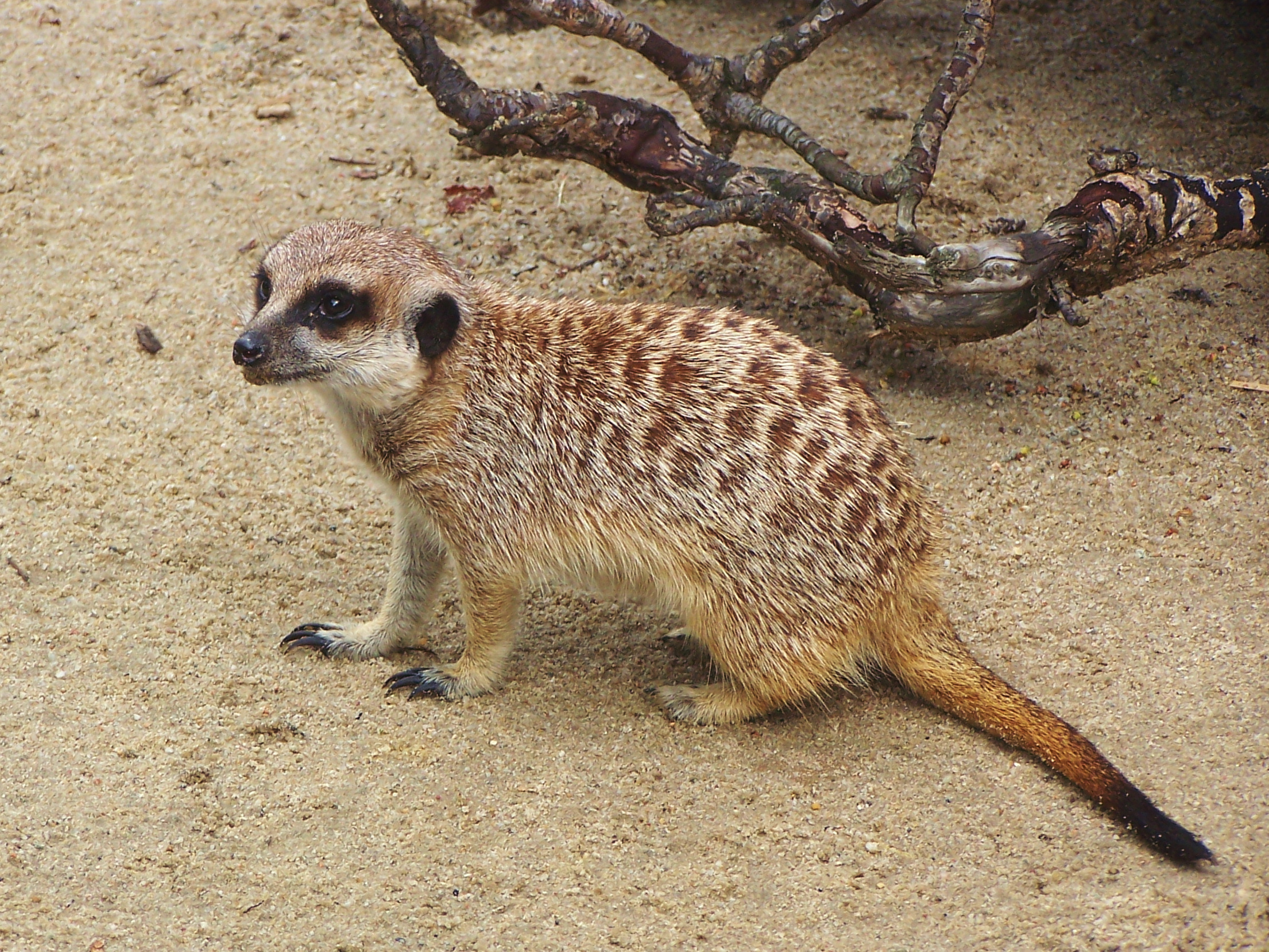
Close view of a meerkat. Note the banded pattern, the big eye circles, and the thin tail.

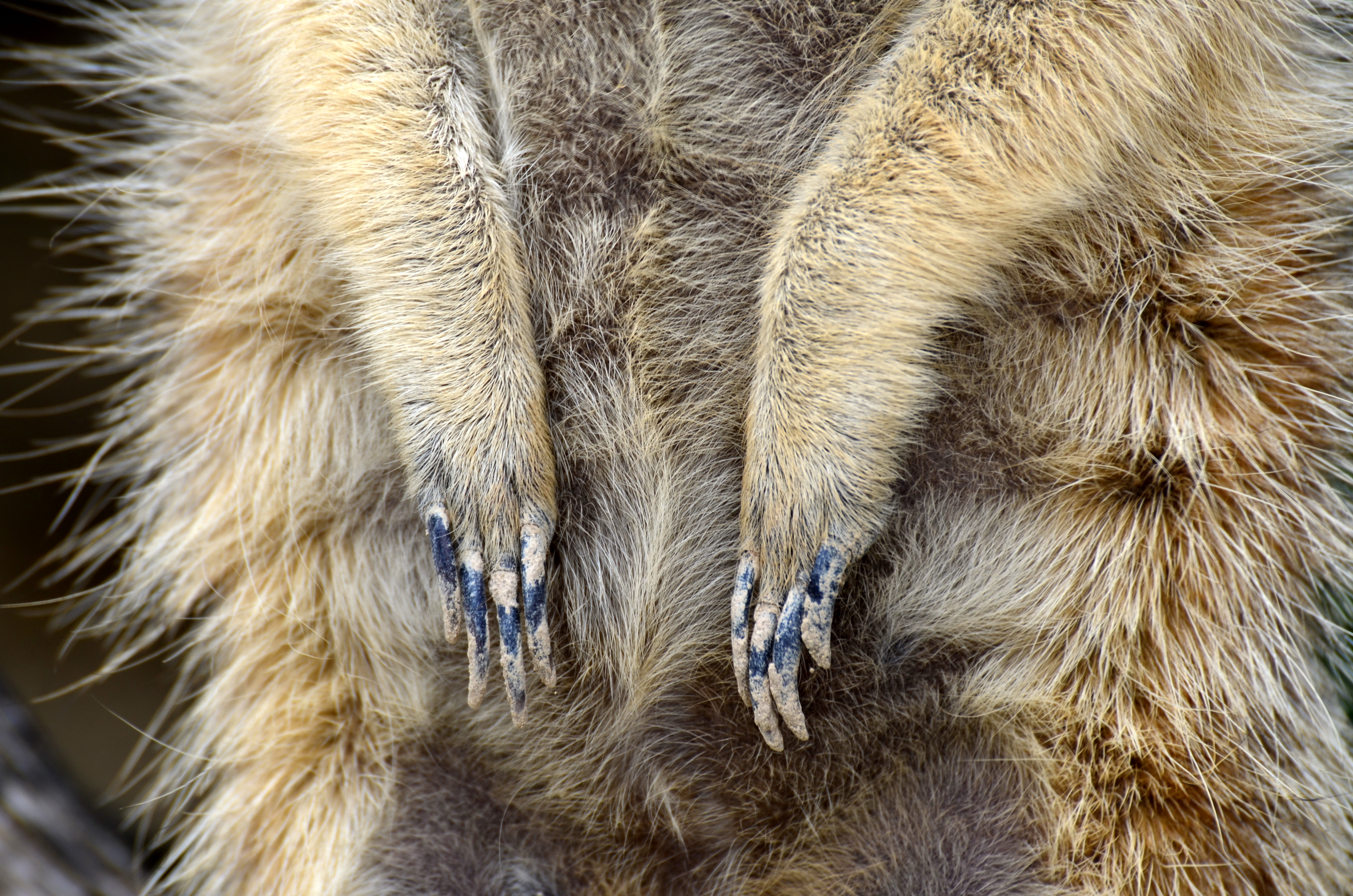
The sharp, curved foreclaws are adapted for digging.

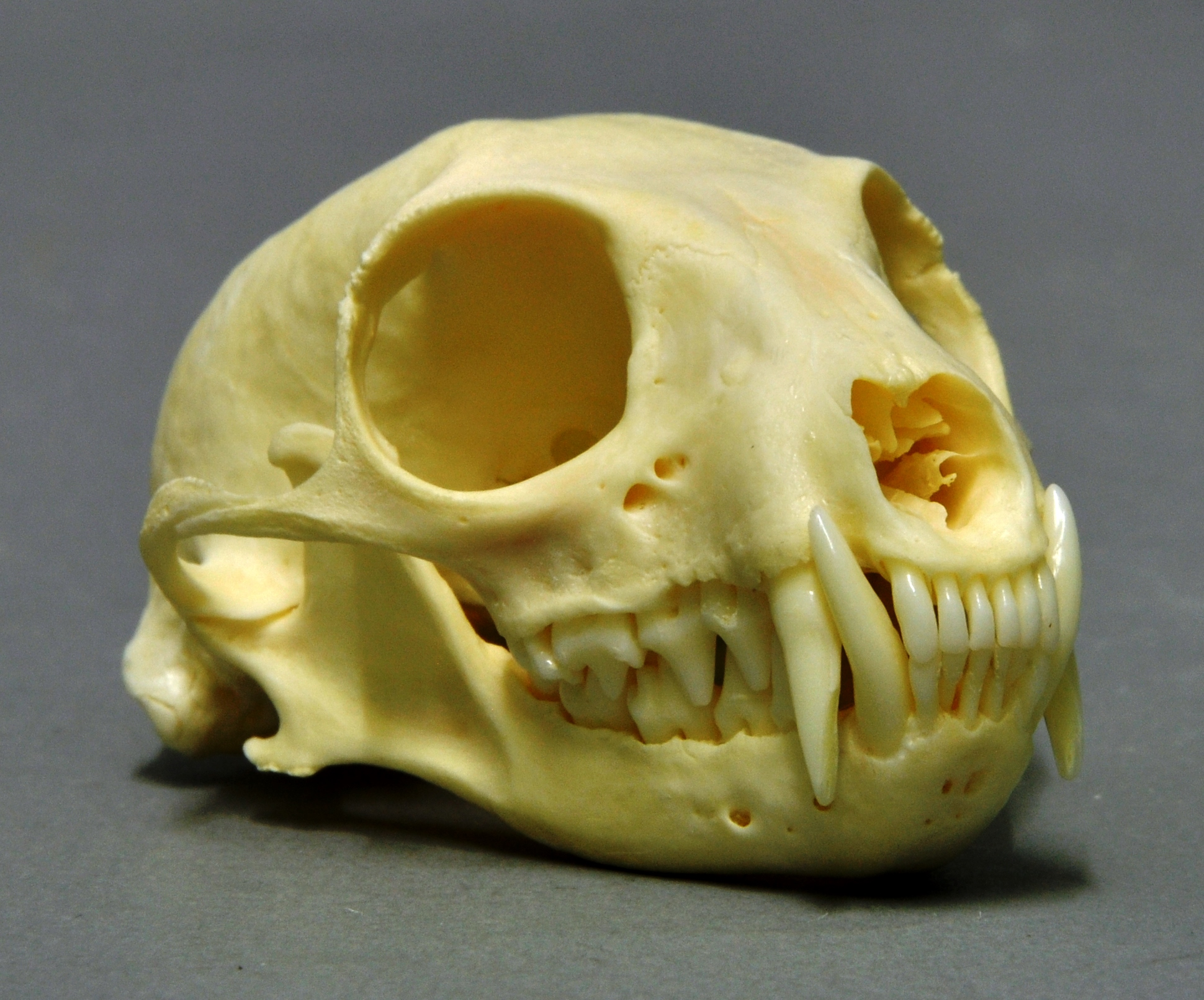
Skull of a meerkat

The meerkat is a small mongoose of slim build characterised by a broad head, large eyes, a pointed snout, long legs, a thin tapering tail, and a brindled coat pattern. It is smaller than most other mongooses except the dwarf mongooses (genus Helogale) and possibly Galerella species. The head-and-body length is around 24–35 cm (9.4–13.8 in), and the weight has been recorded to be between 0.62–0.97 kg (1.4–2.1 lb) without much variation between the sexes (though some dominant females can be heavier than the rest). The soft coat is light grey to yellowish brown with alternate, poorly defined light and dark bands on the back. Individuals from the southern part of the range tend to be darker. The guard hairs, light at the base, have two dark rings and are tipped with black or silvery white; several such hairs aligned together give rise to the coat pattern. These hairs are typically between 1.5 and 2 cm (0.59 and 0.79 in), but measure 3–4 cm (1.2–1.6 in) on the flanks. Its head is mostly white, and the underparts are covered sparsely with dark reddish-brown fur, with the dark skin underneath showing through. The eyes, in sockets covering over 20% of the skull length, are capable of binocular vision. The slim, yellowish tail, unlike the bushy tails of many other mongooses, measures 17 to 25 cm (6.7 to 9.8 in), and is tipped with black. Females have six nipples. The meerkat looks similar to two sympatric species—the banded and the yellow mongooses. The meerkat can be told apart from the banded mongoose by its smaller size, shorter tail, and bigger eyes relative to the head; the yellow mongoose differs in having a bushy tail and lighter coat with an inner layer of yellow fur under the normal brown fur.

The meerkat has 36 teeth with the dental formula of 3.1.3.23.1.3.2. It is well adapted for digging, movement through tunnels, and standing erect, though it is not as capable of running and climbing. The big, sharp and curved foreclaws (slightly longer than the hindclaws) are highly specialised among the feliforms, and enable the meerkat to dig efficiently. The black, crescent-like ears can be closed to prevent the entry of dirt and debris while digging. The tail is used to balance when standing upright. Digitigrade, the meerkat has four digits on each foot with thick pads underneath.

The meerkat has a specialised thermoregulation system that helps it survive in its harsh desert habitat. A study showed that its body temperature follows a diurnal rhythm, averaging 38.3 °C (100.9 °F) during the day and 36.3 °C (97.3 °F) at night. As the body temperature falls below the thermoneutral zone, determined to be 30–32.5 °C (86.0–90.5 °F), the heart rate and oxygen consumption plummet; perspiration increases sharply at temperatures above this range. Additionally, it has a basal metabolic rate remarkably lower than other carnivores, which helps in conserving water, surviving on lower amounts of food, and decreasing heat output from metabolic processes. During winter, it balances heat loss by increasing the metabolic heat generation and other methods such as sunbathing.

== Ecology and behaviour ==
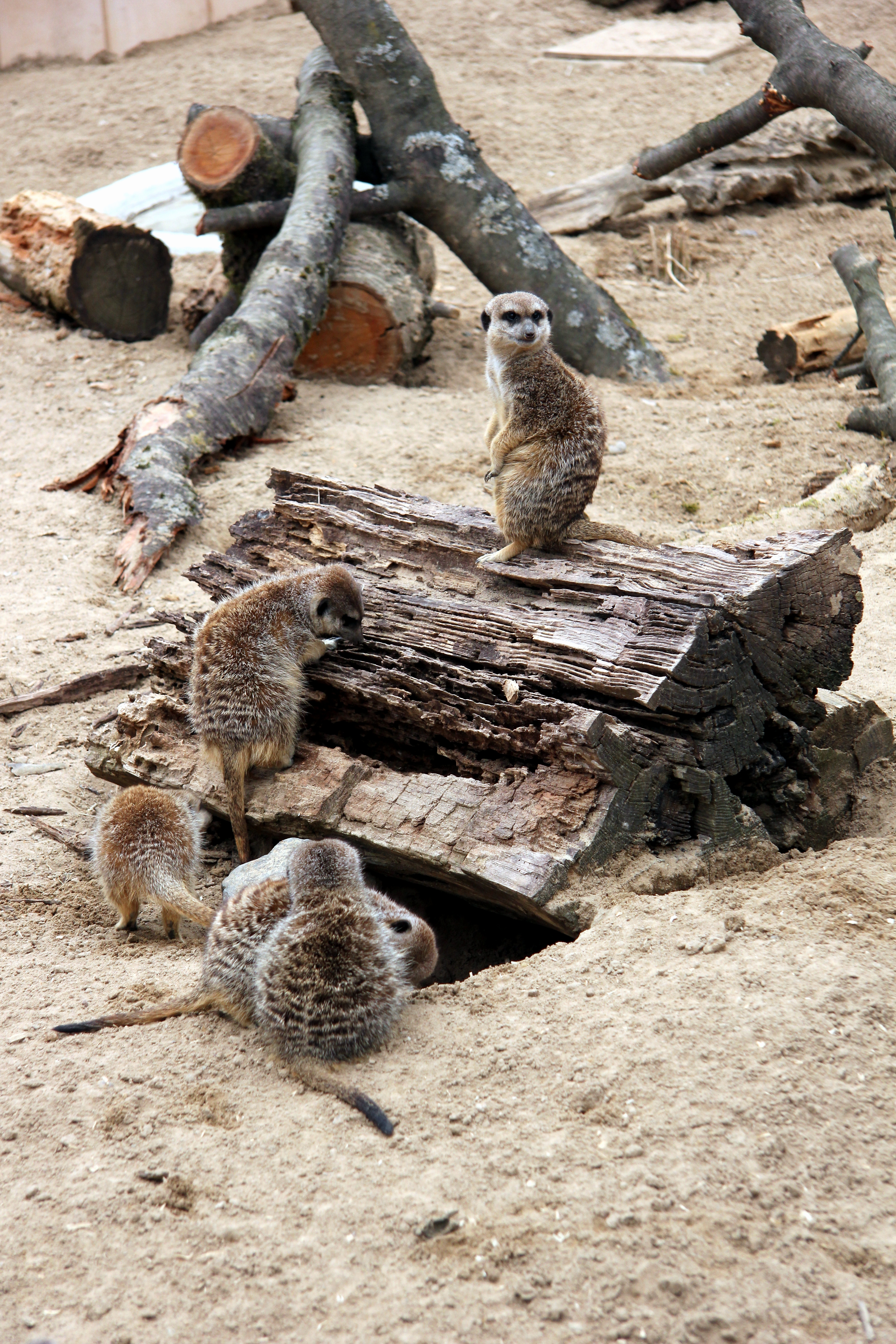
A pack of meerkats

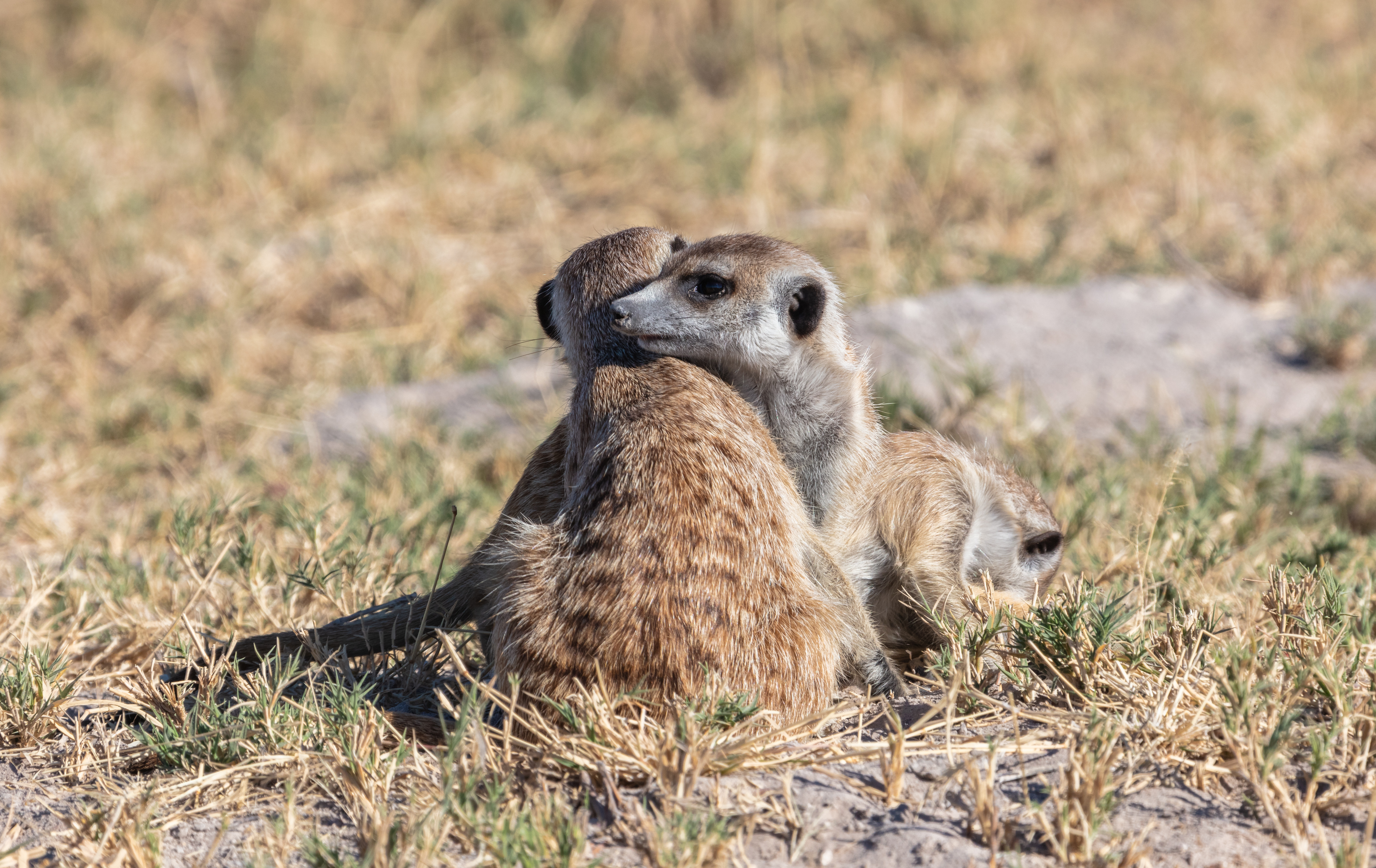
Huddling together for warmth

The meerkat is a social mammal, forming packs of two to 30 individuals each comprising nearly equal numbers of either sex and multiple family units of pairs and their offspring. Members of a pack take turns at jobs such as looking after pups and keeping a lookout for predators. Meerkats are a cooperatively breeding species—typically the dominant 'breeders' in a pack produce offspring. The nonbreeding, subordinate 'helpers' provide altruistic care for the pups. This division of labour is not as strictly defined as it is in specialised eusocial species, such as the breeder-worker distinction in ants. Moreover, meerkats have a clear dominance hierarchy with older individuals having a higher social status. A study showed that dominant individuals can contribute more to offspring care when fewer helpers were available; subordinate members increased their contributions if they could forage better.

Packs live in rock crevices in stony areas and in large burrow systems in plains. A pack generally occupies a home range, 5 km^{2} (1.9 sq mi) large on average but sometimes as big as 15 km^{2} (5.8 sq mi), containing many burrows 50 to 100 m (160 to 330 ft) apart, of which some remain unused. A 2019 study showed that large burrows towards the centre of a range are preferred over smaller ones located near the periphery; this was especially the case with packs that had pups to raise. A pack may shift to another burrow if the dominant female has little success finding prey in an area. The area near the periphery of home ranges is scent marked using anal gland secretions mostly by the dominant individuals; there are communal latrines, 1 km^{2} (0.39 sq mi) large, close to the burrows. Packs can migrate collectively in search of food, to escape high predator pressure, and during floods.

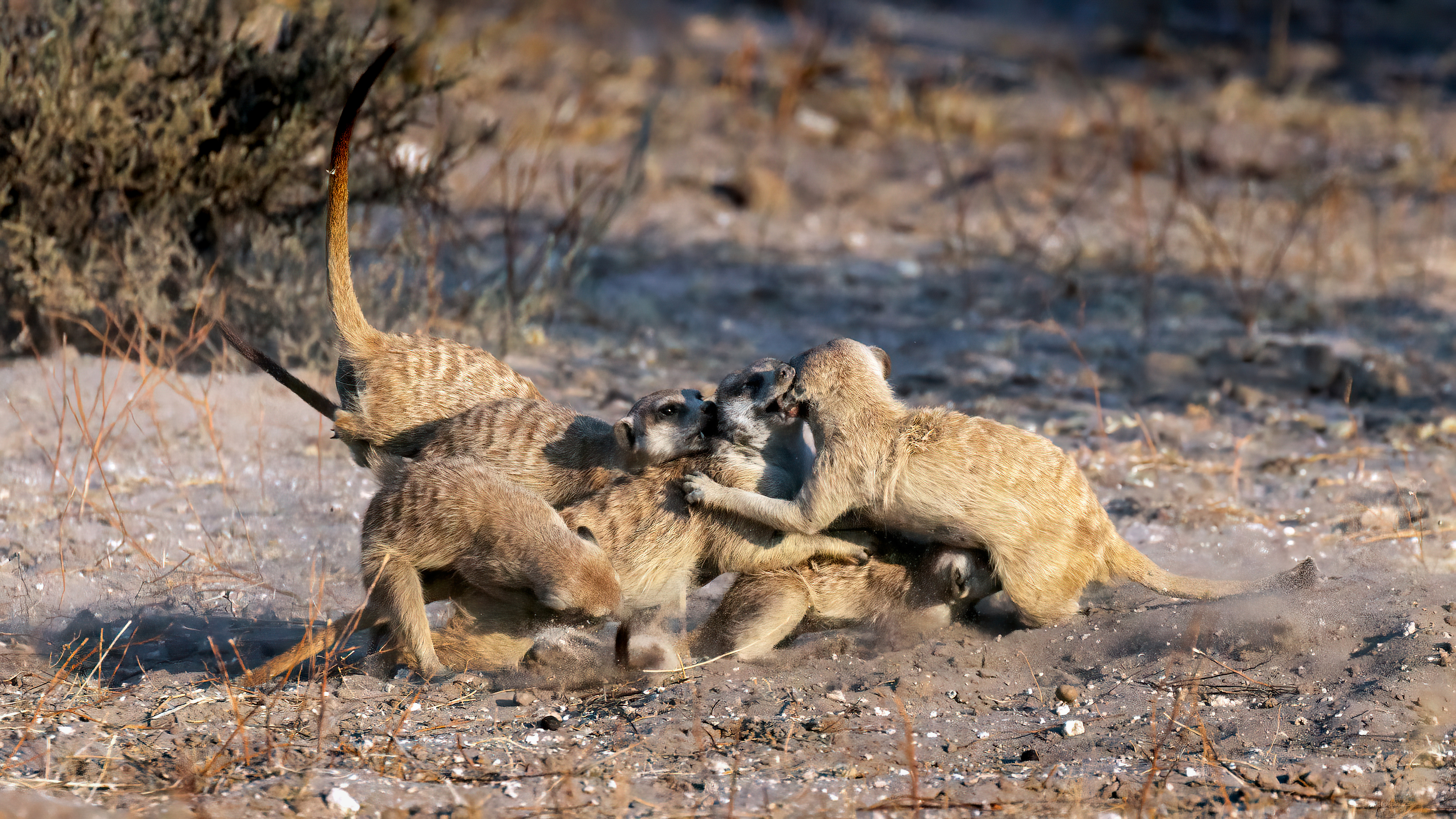
Meerkats fighting, in South Africa

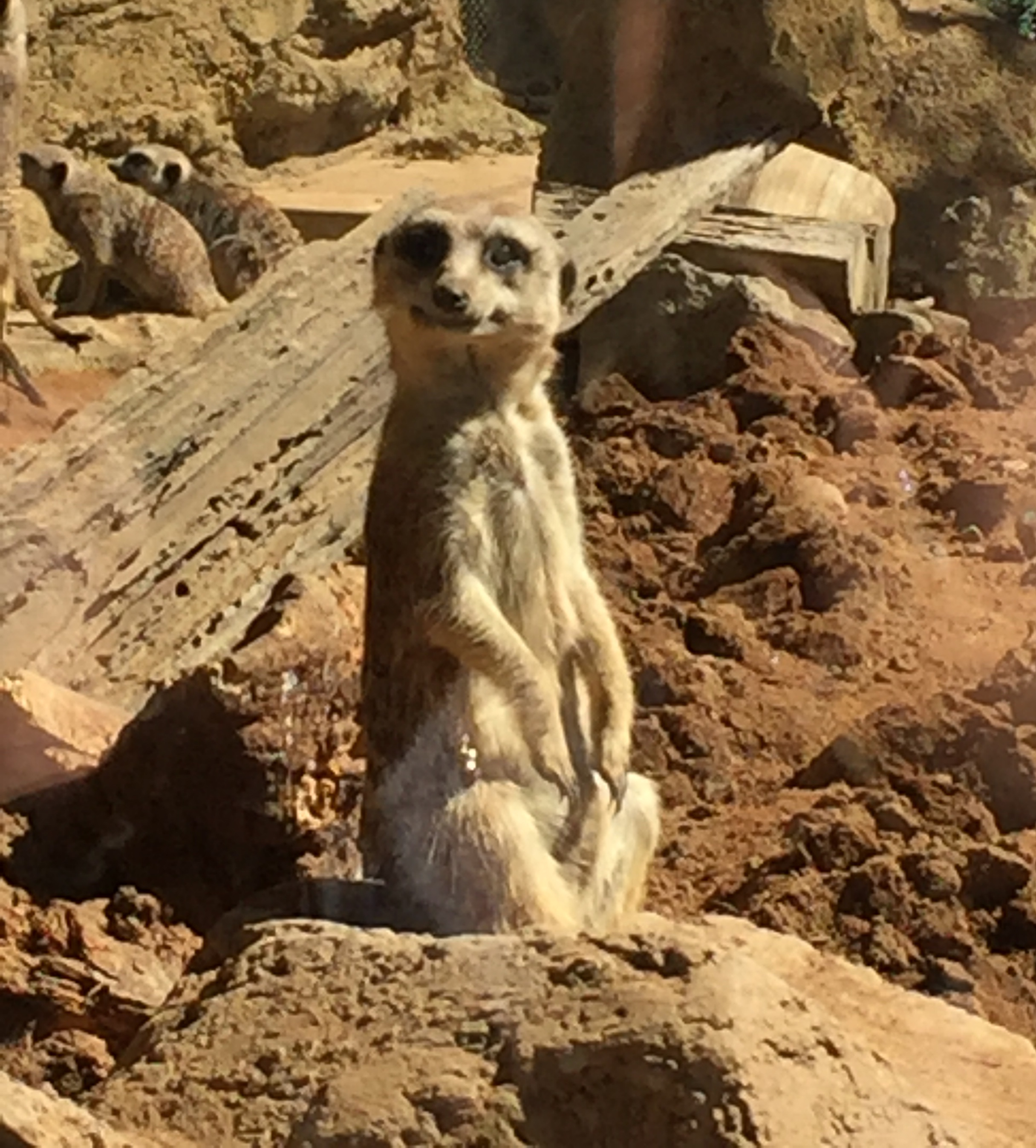
Auckland Zoo, 2018, close up of a Meerkat in lookout position

Meerkats are highly vigilant and frequently survey their surroundings by turning their heads side to side; some individuals always stand sentry and look out for danger. Vocal communication is used frequently in different contexts; for instance, repetitive, high-pitched barks are used to warn others of predators nearby. They will generally retreat to their burrows for safety, where they will remain until the danger is gone. They stick their heads out of burrows to check the area outside, still barking. Mobs of meerkats fiercely attack snakes that may come near them. Cape cobras and raptors such as bateleurs, martial eagles, tawny eagles, lanner falcons, and pale chanting goshawks are predators of juveniles and pups. Meerkats may also be preyed upon by lions, spotted hyenas, honey badgers, bat-eared foxes, black-backed jackals, and Cape foxes.

=== Social behaviour ===
Encounters between members of different packs are highly aggressive, leading to severe injuries and often deaths; 19% of meerkats die by conspecific violence, which is the highest recorded percentage among mammals. Females, often the heaviest ones, try to achieve dominance over the rest in many ways such as fierce competition or taking over from the leader of the pack. A study showed that females who grew faster were more likely to assert dominance, though males did not show such a trend. Males seeking dominance over groups tend to scent mark extensively and are not submissive; they often drive out older males in a group and take over the pack themselves. Subordinate individuals face difficulties in breeding successfully; for instance, dominant females often kill the litters of subordinate ones. As such, subordinate individuals might disperse to other packs to find mates during the breeding season. Some subordinate meerkats will even kill the pups of dominant members in order to improve their own offspring's position. It can take days for emigrants to secure entry into other packs, and they often face aversion from the members. Males typically succeed in joining existing groups; they often inspect other packs and their burrow systems in search of breeding opportunities. Many often team up in 'coalitions' for as long as two months and travel nearly 5 km (3.1 mi) a day on twisted paths. Dispersal appears to be less common in females, possibly because continuing to stay within a pack can eventually win them dominance over other members. Dispersed females travel longer than coalitions, and tend to start groups of their own or join other similar females; they aim for groups of emigrant males or those without a breeding female. Subordinate females, unlike subordinate males, might be ousted from their packs, especially in the latter part of the dominant female's pregnancy. However, they may be allowed to return after the birth of the pups.

=== Burrowing ===
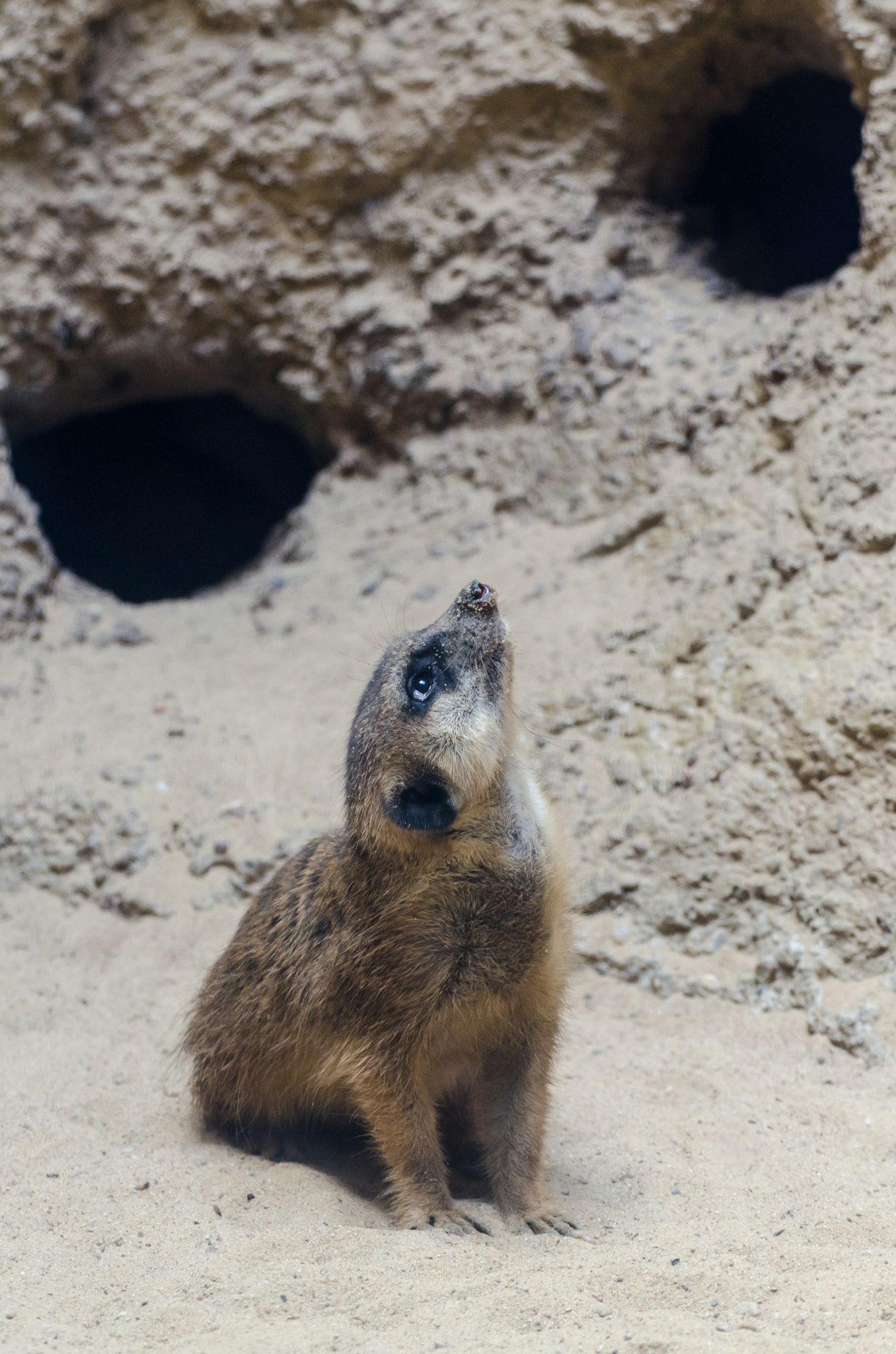
A meerkat sitting close to openings of a warren

Meerkat burrows are typically 5 m (16 ft) in diameter with around 15 openings, though one of dimensions 25 by 32 m (82 by 105 ft) with as many as 90 holes has been reported. These large underground networks comprise two to three levels of tunnels up to 1.5 m (4 ft 11 in) into the ground; the tunnels, around 7.5 cm (3.0 in) high at the top, become broader after descending around a metre. The entrances, 15 cm (5.9 in) in diameter, are created by digging at an angle of 40 degrees to the surface; the soil accumulated as a result can slightly increase the height of burrow sites. 'Boltholes' are used for a quick escape if danger is detected. While constructing or renovating burrows, meerkats will line up to form a continuous head-to-tail chain, break the soil into crumbs with their foreclaws, scoop it out with their forepaws joined, and throw it behind them between their hind legs.

Outside temperatures are not reflected at once within burrows; instead, there is usually an eight-hour lag, which creates a temperature gradient in warrens, so that burrows are coolest in daytime and warmest at night. Temperatures inside burrows typically vary between 21 and 39 °C (70 and 102 °F) in summer and −4 and 26 °C (25 and 79 °F) in winter; temperatures at greater depths vary to a much lesser extent, with summer temperatures around 22.6 to 23.2 °C (72.7 to 73.8 °F) and winter temperatures around 10 to 10.8 °C (50.0 to 51.4 °F). This reduces the need for meerkats to thermoregulate individually by providing a comfortable microclimate within burrows; moreover, burrowing protects meerkats in harsh weather and at extreme temperatures. Consequently, meerkats spend considerable time in burrows; they are active mainly during the day and return to burrows after dark and often to escape the heat of the afternoon. Activity peaks during the early morning and late afternoon. Meerkats huddle together to sleep in compact groups, sunbathe, and recline on warm rocks or damp soil to adjust their body temperatures.

Meerkats tend to occupy the burrows of other small mammals more than constructing them on their own; they generally share burrows with Cape ground squirrels and yellow mongooses. Cape ground squirrels and meerkats usually do not fight for space or food. Though yellow mongooses are also insectivores like meerkats, competition for prey is minimal as yellow mongooses are less selective in their diet. This association is beneficial to all the species as it saves time and effort spent on making separate warrens. Many other species have also been recorded in the meerkat burrows, including African pygmy mice, Cape grey mongooses, four-striped grass mice, Highveld gerbils, rock hyraxes, slender mongooses, South African springhares and white-tailed rats.

=== Vocalisations ===
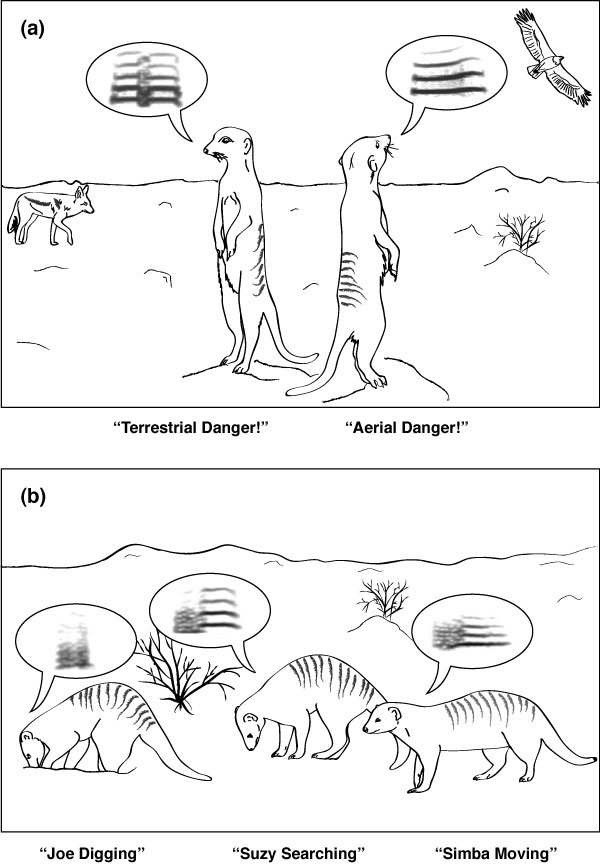
Calls of meerkats (above) and banded mongooses (below)

Meerkats have a broad vocal repertoire that they use to communicate among one another in several contexts; many of these calls may be combined by repetition of the same call or mixing different sounds. A study recorded 12 different types of call combinations used in different situations, such as guarding against predators, caring for young, digging, sunbathing, huddling together, and aggression.

Short-range 'close calls' are produced while foraging and after scanning the vicinity for predators. 'Recruitment calls' can be produced to collect meerkats on sighting a snake or to investigate excrement or hair samples of predators or unfamiliar meerkats. 'Alarm calls' are given out on detecting predators. All these calls differ in their acoustic characteristics, and can evoke different responses in the 'receivers' (meerkats who hear the call); generally, the greater the urgency of the scenario in which the call is given, the stronger is the response in the receivers.

This indicates that meerkats are able to perceive the nature of the risk and the degree of urgency from the acoustics of a call, transmit it, and respond accordingly. For instance, upon hearing a terrestrial predator alarm call, meerkats are most likely to scan the area and move towards the source of the call. In contrast, an aerial predator alarm call would most likely cause them to crouch down. A recruitment call would cause receivers to raise their tails (and often their hair) and move slowly towards the source.

The complexity of calls produced by different mongooses varies by their social structure and ecology. For instance, eusocial mongooses such as meerkats and banded mongooses use calls in a greater variety of contexts than do the solitary slender mongooses. Moreover, meerkats have more call types than do banded mongooses. Meerkat calls carry information to identify the signalling individual or pack, but meerkats do not appear to differentiate between calls from different sources. The calls of banded mongooses also carry a 'vocal signature' to identify the caller.

=== Diet ===
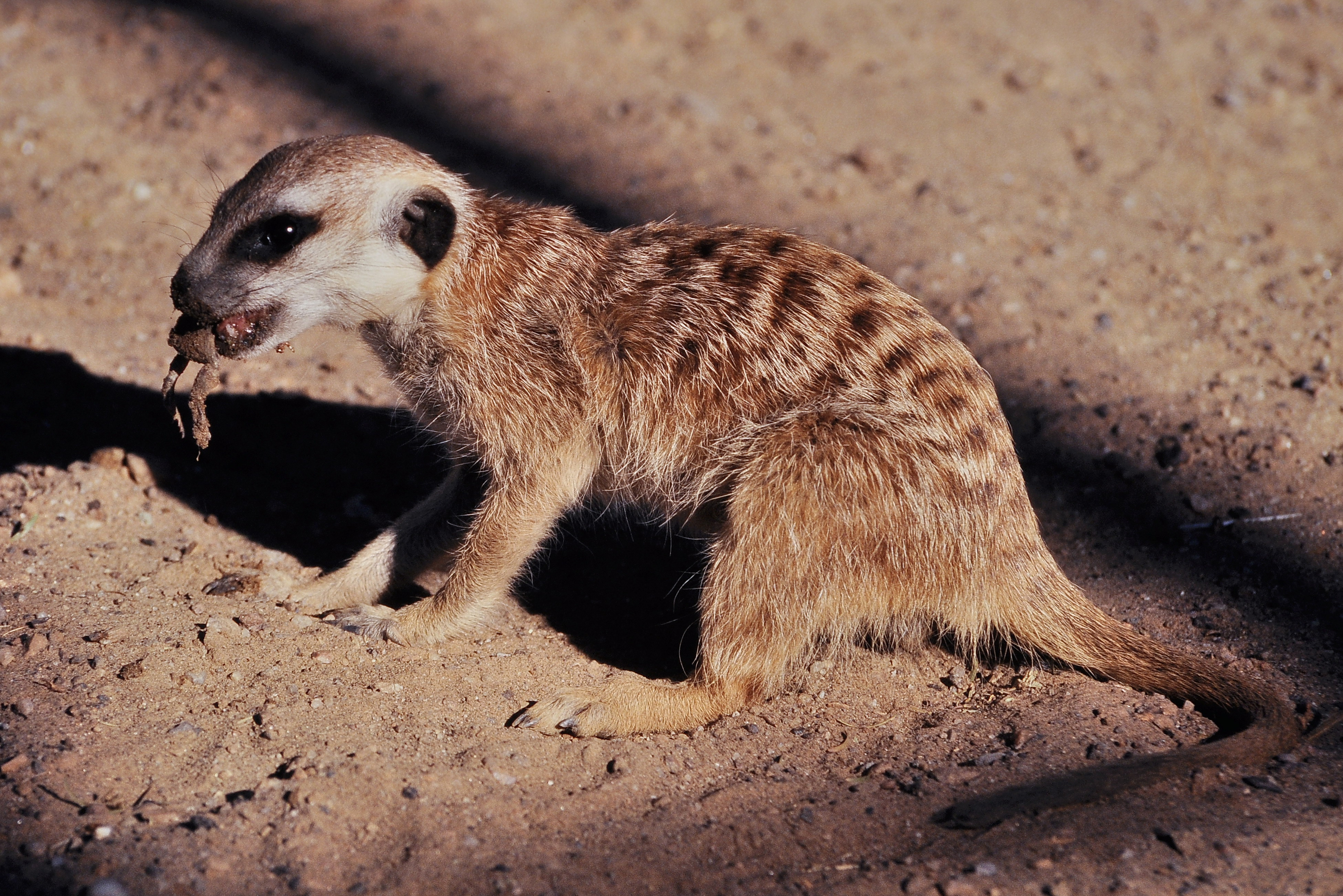
Eating a frog

The meerkat is primarily an insectivore, feeding heavily on beetles and lepidopterans; it can additionally feed on eggs, amphibians, arthropods (such as scorpions, to whose venom they are immune), reptiles, small birds (such as the southern anteater-chat), plants and seeds. Captive meerkats include plenty of fruits and vegetables in their diet, and also kill small mammals by biting the backs of their skulls. They have also been observed feeding on the desert truffle Kalaharituber pfeilii. Meerkats often eat citron melons and dig out roots and tubers for their water content.

Mongooses spend nearly five to eight hours foraging every day. Like other social mongooses, meerkats in a pack will disperse within 5 m (16 ft) of one another and browse systematically in areas within their home range without losing visual or vocal contact. Some individuals stand sentry while the rest are busy foraging. Meerkats return to an area only after a week of the last visit so that the food supply is replenished sufficiently. They hunt by scent, and often dig out soil or turn over stones to uncover hidden prey. Meerkats typically do not give chase to their prey, though they may pursue geckos and lizards over several metres. Food intake is typically low during winter.

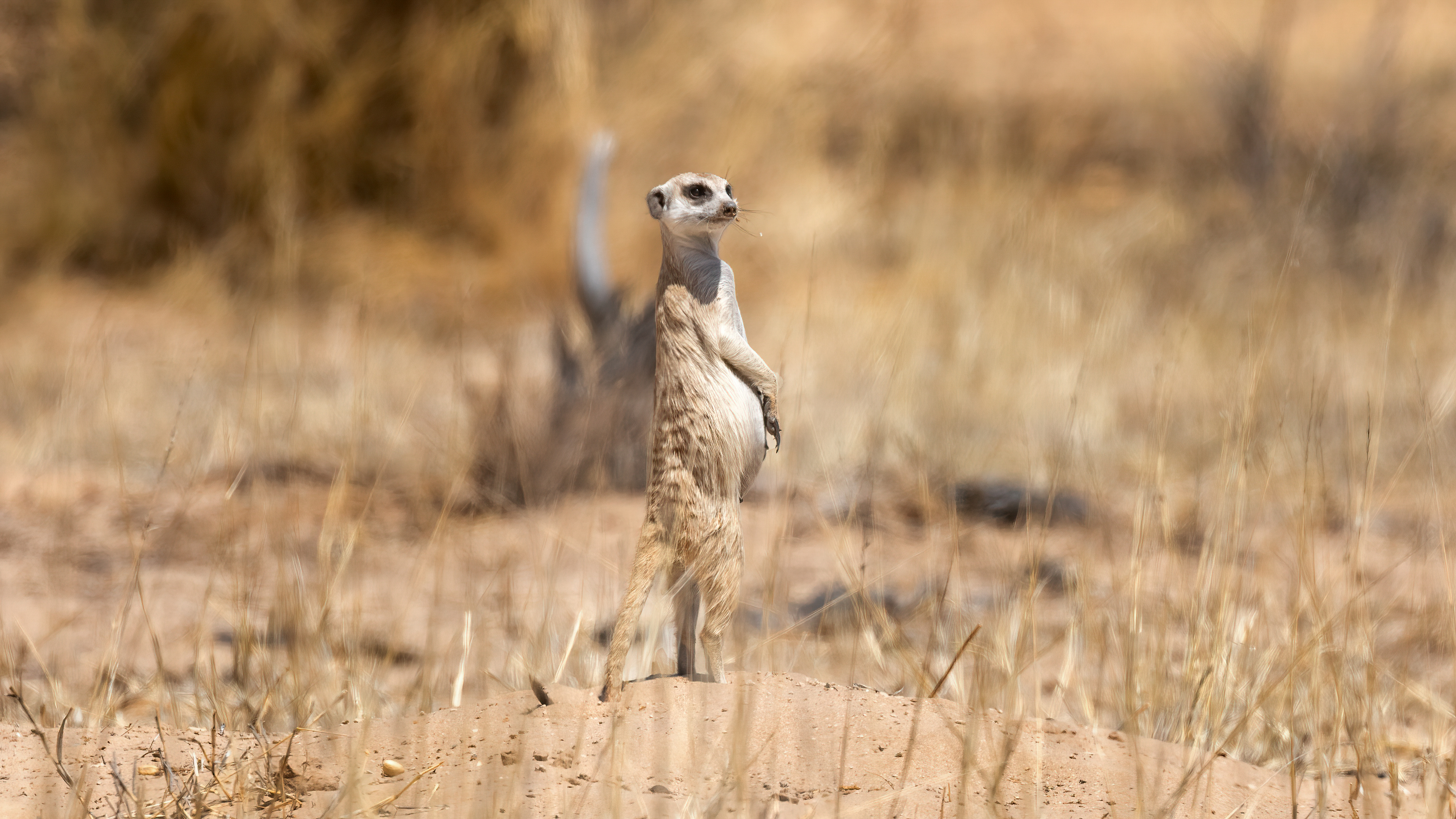
Pregnant meerkat in South Africa

=== Reproduction ===
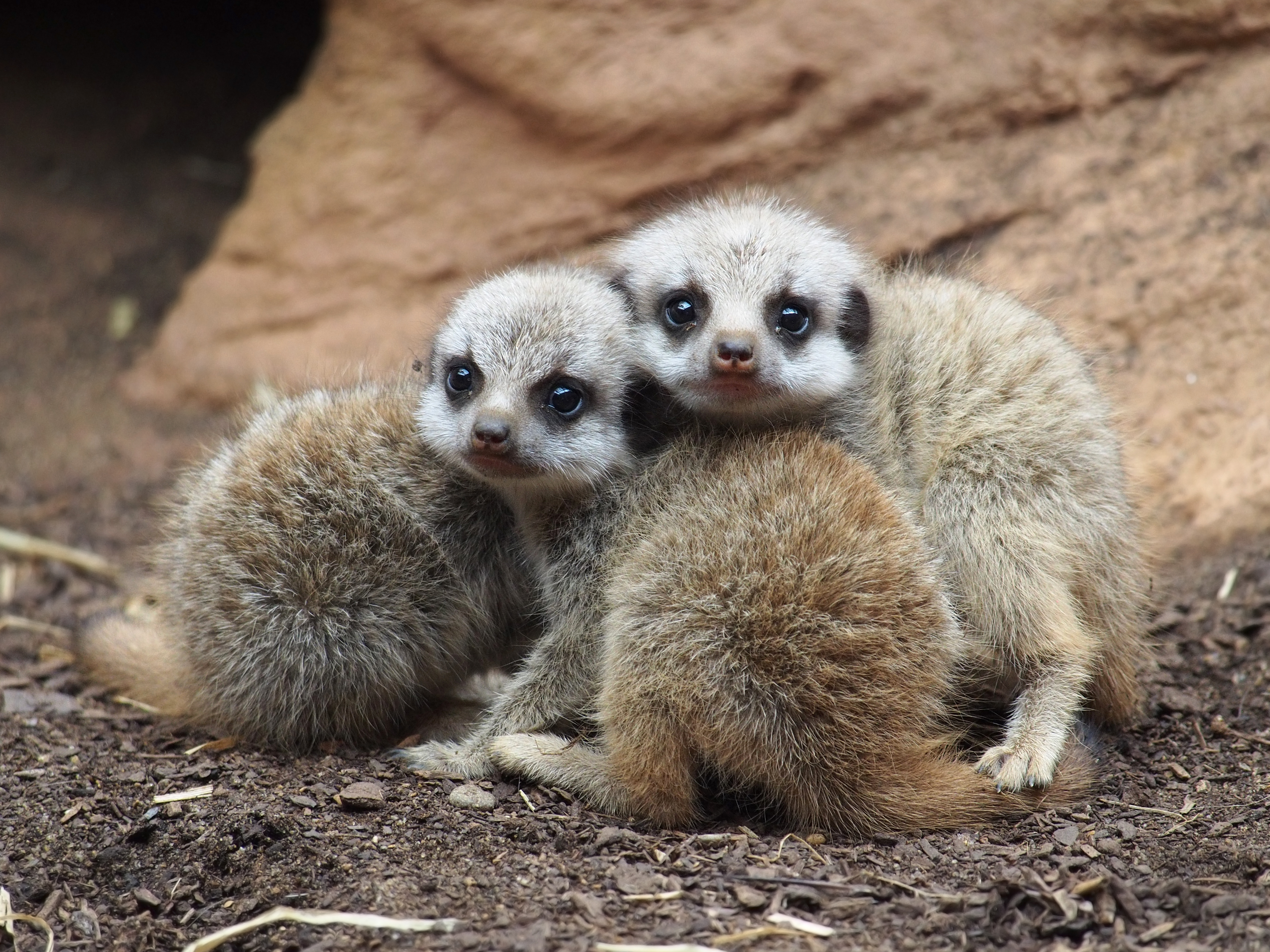
Meerkat pups

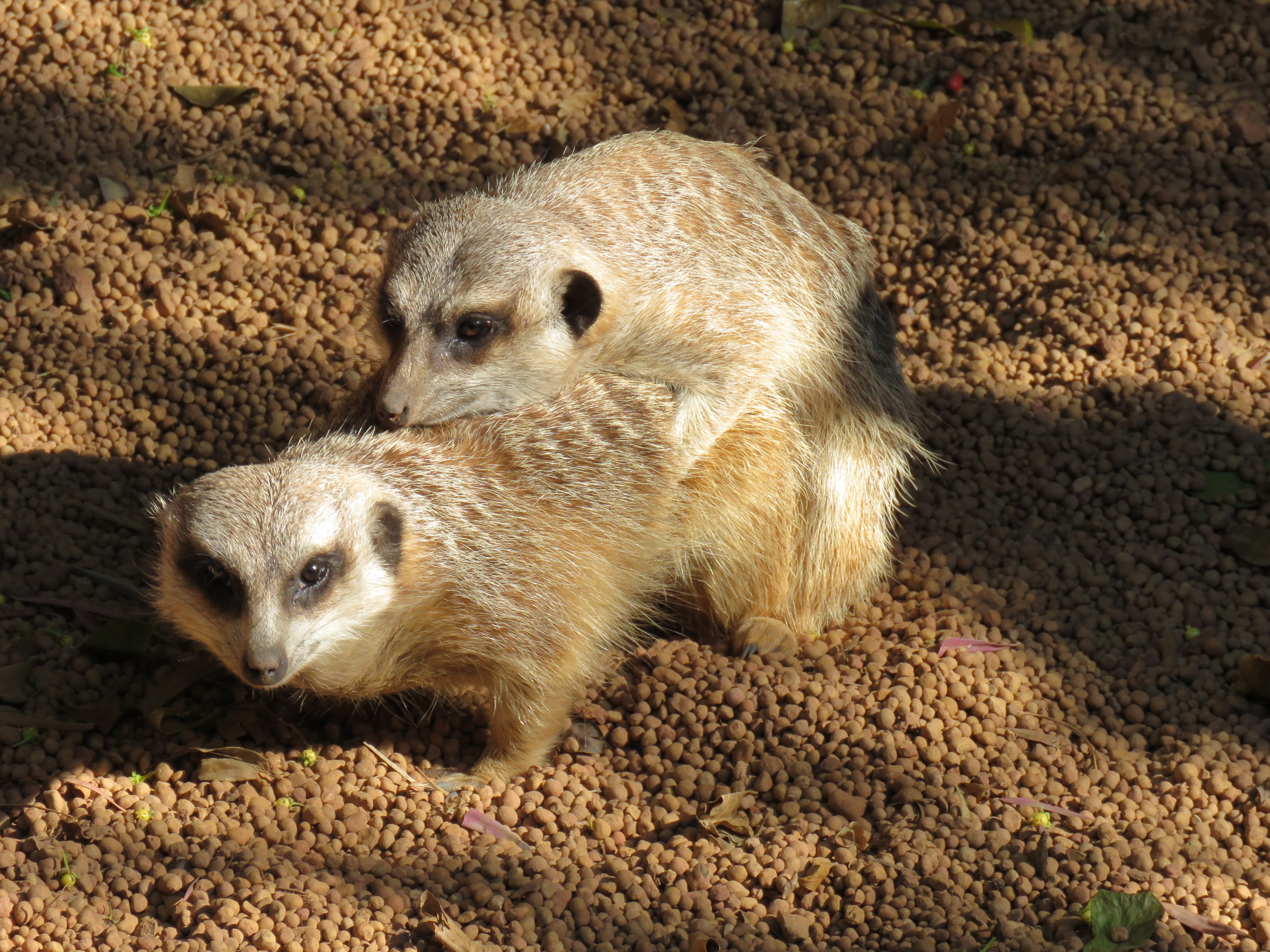
Meerkats mating in Perth Zoo

Meerkats breed throughout the year with seasonal peaks, typically during months of heavy rainfall; for instance, maximum births occur from January to March in the southern Kalahari. Generally, only dominant individuals breed, though subordinate members can also mate in highly productive years. Females become sexually mature at two to three years of age. Dominant females can have up to four litters annually (fewer for subordinate females), and the number depends on the amount of precipitation. Mating behaviour has been studied in captive individuals. Courtship behaviour is limited; the male fights with his partner, getting hold of her by her snout. He will grip the nape of her neck if she resists mounting, and hold her down by grasping her flanks during copulation.

After a gestation of 60 to 70 days, a litter of three to seven pups is born. Pups weigh around 100 g (3.5 oz) in the first few days of birth; the average growth rate for the first three months is 4.5 g (0.16 oz) per day, typically the fastest in the first month. A 2019 study showed that growth and survival rates of pups might decrease with an increase in temperature.

Infants make continuous sounds that resemble bird-like tweets, which change to a shrill contact call as they grow older. Young pups are kept securely in a den, from where they emerge after around 16 days, and start foraging with adults by 26 days. The nonbreeding members of the pack help substantially with juvenile care; for instance, they feed the pups and huddle with them for warmth. A study showed that nearly half of the litters of dominant females, especially those born later in the breeding season, were nursed by subordinate females, mostly those that were or recently had been pregnant.

Sex biases have been observed in feeding; for instance, female helpers feed female pups more than male pups, unlike male helpers who feed both equally. This is possibly because the survival of female pups is more beneficial to female helpers, as females are more likely to remain in their natal pack. Some helpers contribute to all activities more than others, though none of them might be specialised in any of them. Sometimes helpers favour their own needs over those of pups and decide not to feed them; this behaviour, known as "false-feeding", is more common when the meerkat values the prey more.

The father remains on guard and protects his offspring, while the mother spends a lot of time foraging to produce enough milk for her young. Mothers give out shrill, repetitive calls to ensure their pups follow them and remain close together. Unable to forage themselves, young pups vocalise often seeking food from their carers. Like many species, meerkat pups learn by observing and mimicking adult behaviour, though adults also engage in active instruction. For example, meerkat adults teach their pups how to eat a venomous scorpion by removing the stinger and showing the pups how to handle the creature. The mother runs around with prey in her mouth, prompting her pups to catch it. Pups become independent enough to forage at around 12 weeks of age. Meerkats are estimated to survive for five to 15 years in the wild; the maximum lifespan recorded in captivity is 20.6 years.

Females appear to be able to discriminate the odour of their kin from that of others. Kin recognition is a useful ability that facilitates cooperation among relatives and the avoidance of inbreeding. When mating occurs between meerkat relatives, it often results in negative fitness consequences (inbreeding depression) that affect a variety of traits such as pup mass at emergence from the natal burrow, hind leg length, growth until independence, and juvenile survival. These negative effects are likely due to the increased homozygosity or higher genetic similarity among individuals that arise from inbreeding and the consequent expression of deleterious recessive mutations.

== Distribution and habitat ==
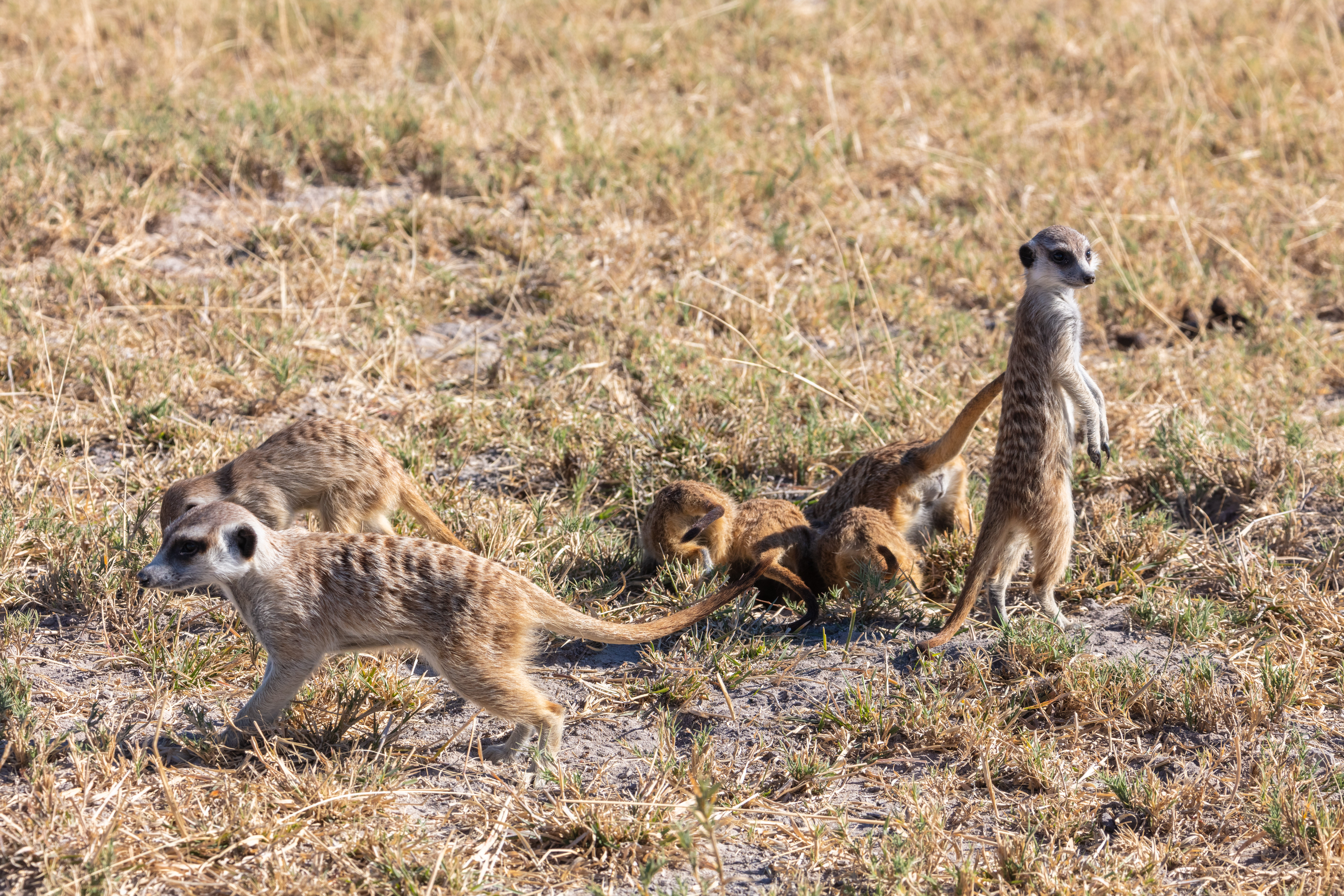
Meerkats prefer areas with short grasses.

The meerkat occurs in southwestern Botswana, western and southern Namibia, northern and western South Africa; the range barely extends into southwestern Angola. It lives in areas with stony, often calcareous ground in a variety of arid, open habitats with little woody vegetation. It is common in savannahs, open plains and rocky areas beside dry rivers in biomes such as the Fynbos and the Karoo, where the mean yearly rainfall is below 600 mm (24 in). The average precipitation reduces to 100 to 400 mm (3.9 to 15.7 in) towards the northwestern areas of the range. It prefers areas with short grasses and shrubs common in velds, such as camelthorn in Namibia and Acacia in the Kalahari. It is absent from true deserts, montane regions, and forests. Population densities vary greatly between places, and are significantly influenced by predators and rainfall. For instance, a study in the Kgalagadi Transfrontier Park, where predation pressure is high, recorded a lower mean meerkat density relative to a ranch with lower occurrence of predators; in response to a 10% decrease in rainfall over a year, the density fell from 0.95 to 0.32/km^{2} (2.46 to 0.83/sq mi).

== Threats and conservation ==
The meerkat is listed as Least Concern on the IUCN Red List; the population trend appears to be stable. There are no significant threats except low rainfall, which can lead to deaths of entire packs. Research has shown that temperature extremes have negative impacts on Kalahari Desert meerkats. Increased maximum air temperature is correlated with decreased survival and body mass in pups, perhaps as a result of dehydration from water loss during evaporative cooling or decreased water content in food, or from the heavier metabolic costs of thermoregulation on hot days. Higher temperatures are also associated with increased rates of endemic tuberculosis infection; this may be due to decreased immune function resulting from physiological stress, as well as increased male emigration rates observed during heat waves.

Meerkats occur in several protected areas such as the Kgalagadi Transfrontier Park and the Makgadikgadi Pan. The Kalahari Meerkat Project, founded by Tim Clutton-Brock, is a long-term research project run by four different research groups that focuses on understanding cooperative behaviour in meerkats. It began in the Gemsbok National Park but was shifted to the Kuruman River Reserve in 1993.

== In culture ==
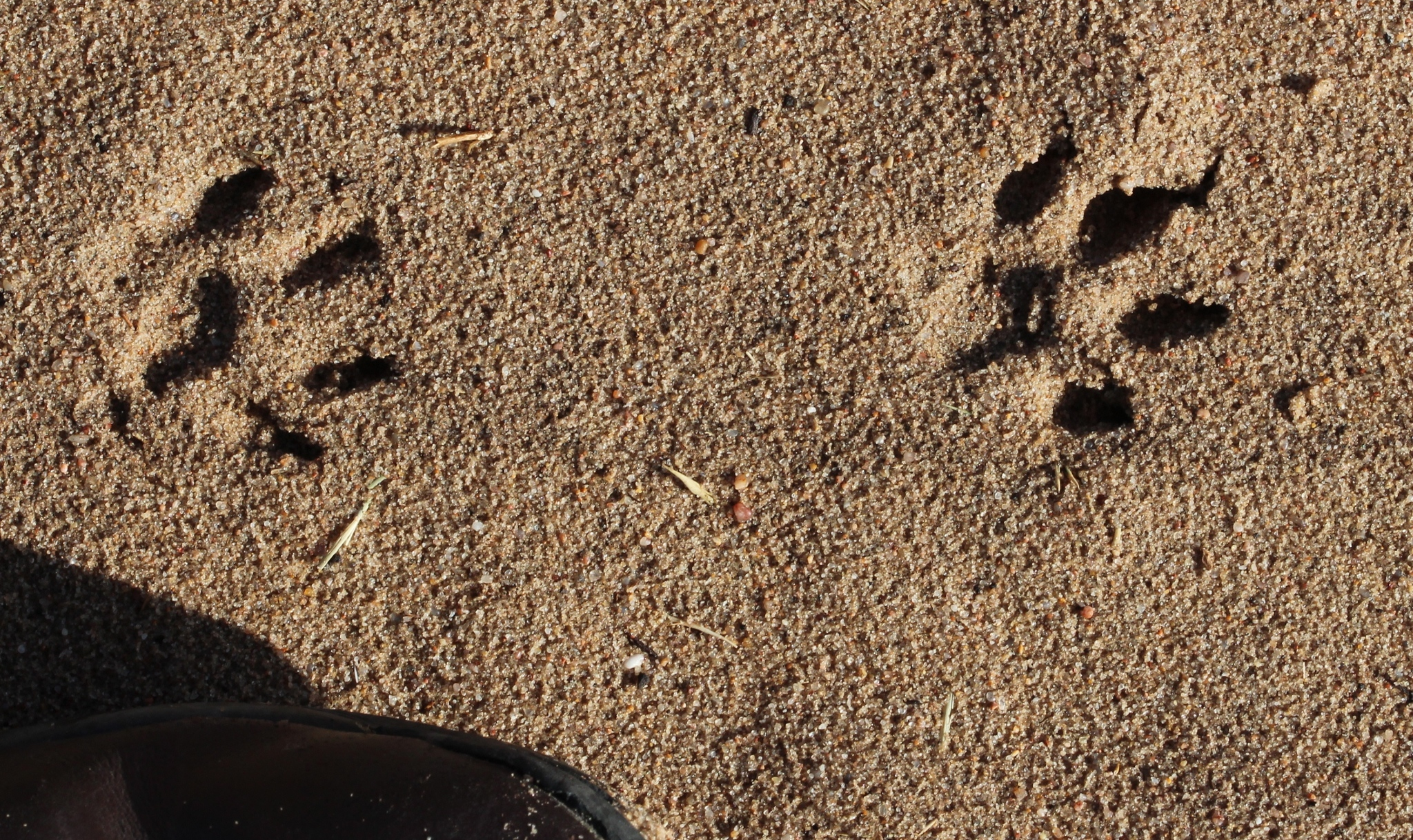
Tracks of a meerkat in sand

Meerkats are generally tame animals. However, they are unsuitable as a pet as they can be aggressive and have a strong, ferret-like odour. In South Africa meerkats are used to kill rodents in rural households and lepidopterans in farmlands. Meerkats can transmit rabies to humans, but yellow mongooses appear to be more common vectors. It has been suggested that meerkats may even limit the spread of rabies by driving out yellow mongooses from their burrows; meerkats are generally not persecuted, given their economic significance in crop protection, though they may be killed due to rabies control measures to eliminate yellow mongooses. Meerkats can also spread tick-borne diseases.

== See also ==
- Compare the Meerkat
