= Angolan kusimanse =

Conservation status
- Least Concern (IUCN 3.1)

Scientific classification
- Kingdom: Animalia
- Phylum: Chordata
- Class: Mammalia
- Order: Carnivora
- Family: Herpestidae
- Genus: Crossarchus
- Species: C. ansorgei

Binomial name
- Crossarchus ansorgei Thomas, 1910
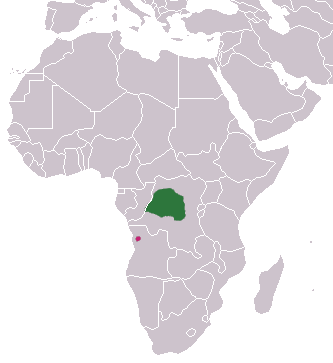
- Angolan kusimanse range (green - extant, pink - probably extant)

Species of mongoose from Africa

The Angolan kusimanse (Crossarchus ansorgei), also known as Ansorge's kusimanse, is a species of small mongoose. There are two recognized subspecies: C. a. ansorgei, found in Angola; and C. a. nigricolor, found in DR Congo, which do not have overlapping ranges. It prefers rainforest type habitat, and avoids regions inhabited by humans. It grows to 12–18 inches in length, with a 6–10 inch long tail, and weighs 1–3 lb. Little is known about this species of kusimanse, and there are no estimates of its wild population numbers or status. Until 1984, the species was only known from two specimens from Baringa but are now thought to be quite common in some regions. Threats are probably habitat loss and bushmeat hunting. However, this species is protected by Salonga National Park.
