= Alexander's kusimanse =

Conservation status
- Least Concern (IUCN 3.1)

Scientific classification
- Kingdom: Animalia
- Phylum: Chordata
- Class: Mammalia
- Order: Carnivora
- Family: Herpestidae
- Genus: Crossarchus
- Species: C. alexandri

Binomial name
- Crossarchus alexandri Thomas & Wroughton, 1907
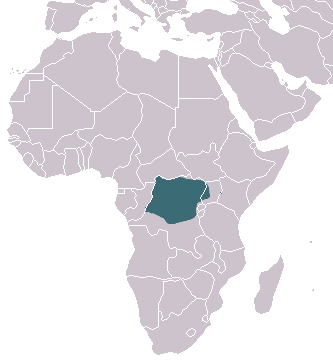
- Alexander's kusimanse range

Synonyms
- Mungos alexandri

Species of mongoose from Central Africa

Alexander's kusimanse (Crossarchus alexandri) is a mongoose species native to Central African rainforests. The species was first described in 1907 by Oldfield Thomas and R. C. Wroughton based on specimens collected by Boyd Alexander, and named after Alexander himself. It is largely restricted to northern Democratic Republic of the Congo, and western Uganda. It is classified as Least Concern on the IUCN Red List.

== Taxonomy ==
Alexander's kusimanse is a species belonging to the mongoose family Herpestidae. The species was first described in 1907 by English zoologists Oldfield Thomas and R. C. Wroughton using specimens collected by Boyd Alexander. The species is named after captain Alexander who collected the specimens. No subspecies of Alexander's Kusimanse has been classified.

== Description ==
Alexander's kusimanse is a small mongoose with short legs. It measures about 375–437 mm (14.8–17.2 in) in body length, and has a 243–318 mm (9.6–12.5 in) long tail. It has brownish black hairy fur with tinges of gray. The head consists of a long snout with pale buff colored lips, and small brownish ears. The hind part of the body is covered with long guard hairs, which are darker at the base and white colored at the tips. The short legs are darker in color, and consist of long, sharp claws. The tail is similar in color to the body, and covered with tufts of hair. The females have three pairs of nipples.

== Distribution and habitat ==
Alexander's kusimanse is restricted to northern Democratic republic of Congo, and western Uganda, and parts of Republic of Congo and Central African Republic. Though it is subject to habitat loss, it is classified as Least Concern on the IUCN Red List.

== Behaviour ==
Alexander's kusimanse is a social species and forages in groups of up to 20 individuals. The animals often mark trees with secretions from their anal glands. They sleep in hollow tree trunks, and dead logs in small groups. This group behavior helps the kusimanses to protect against predators. Any alarm by a single animal results in the group heading for safety. It feeds on grubs, small animals and fruits. It produces a litter of two to four younglings.
