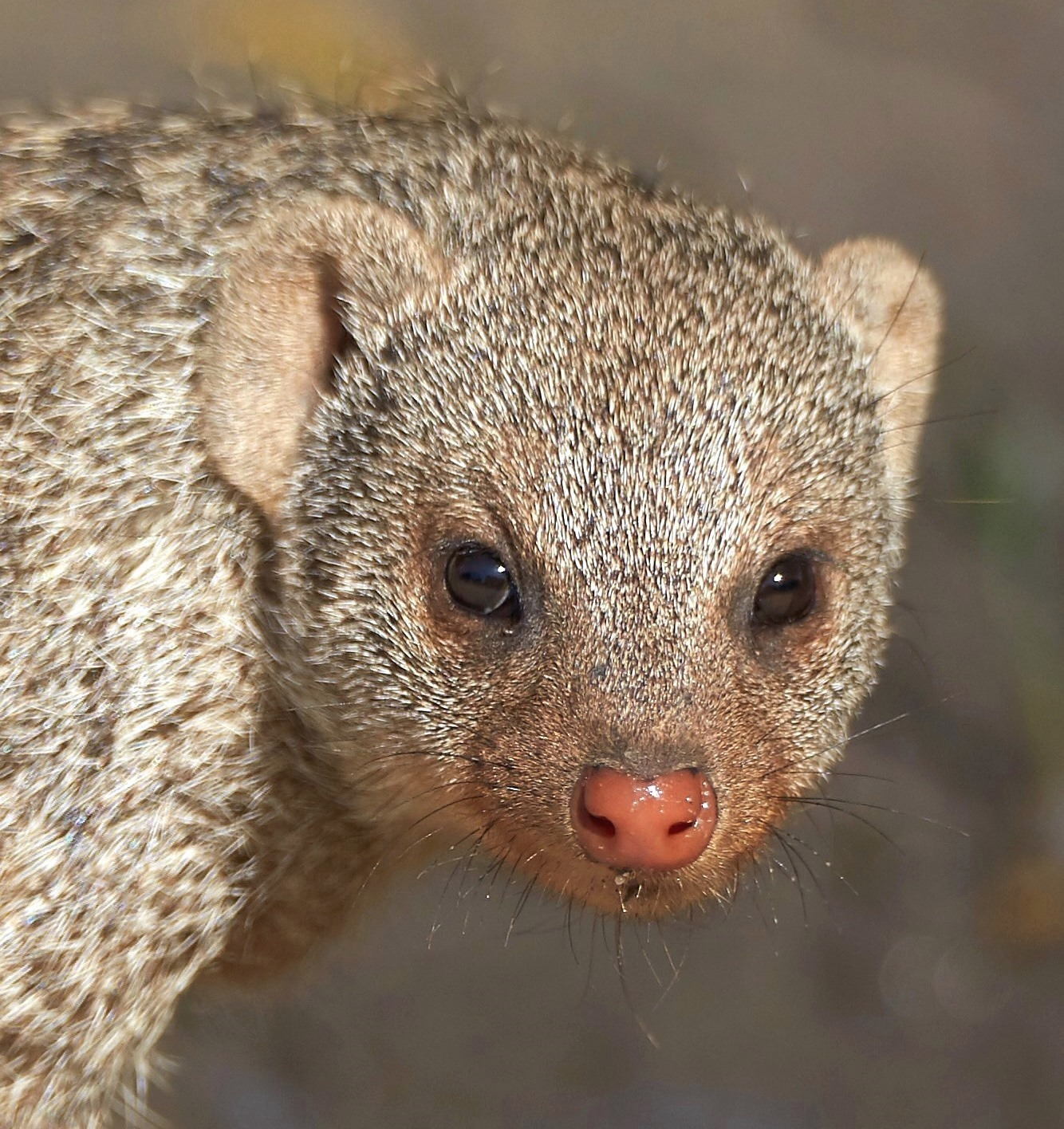

Conservation status
- Least Concern (IUCN 3.1)

Scientific classification
- Kingdom: Animalia
- Phylum: Chordata
- Class: Mammalia
- Order: Carnivora
- Family: Herpestidae
- Genus: Mungos
- Species: M. mungo

Binomial name
- Mungos mungo (Gmelin, 1788)
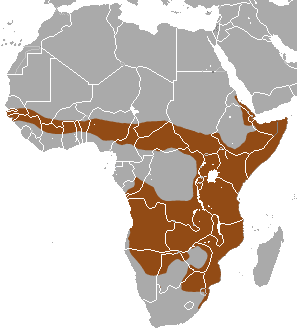
- native range

= Banded mongoose =

Species of mongoose from Africa

The banded mongoose (Mungos mungo) is a mongoose species native from the Sahel to Southern Africa. It lives in savannas, open forests and grasslands and feeds primarily on beetles and millipedes. Mongooses use various types of dens for shelter including termite mounds. While most mongoose species live solitary lives, the banded mongoose live in colonies with a complex social structure.

== Characteristics ==
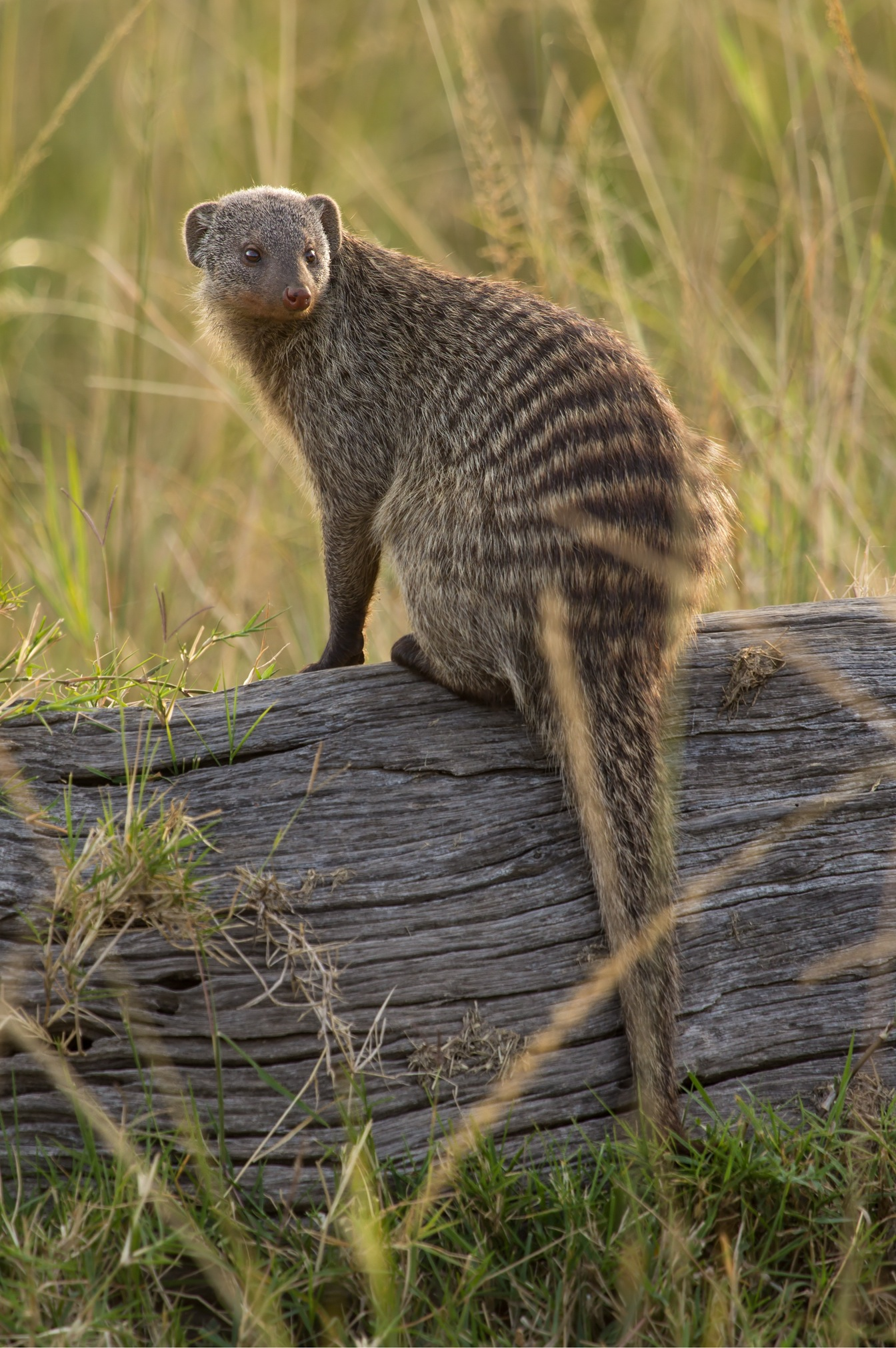
Banded mongoose in Maasai Mara

The banded mongoose is a sturdy mongoose with a large head, small ears, short, muscular limbs and a long tail, almost as long as the rest of the body. Animals of wetter areas are larger and darker colored than animals of dryer regions. The abdominal part of the body is higher and rounder than the breast area. The rough fur is grayish brown and black, and there are several dark brown to black horizontal bars across the back. The limbs and snout are darker, while the underparts are lighter than the rest of the body. Banded mongooses have long strong claws that allow them to dig in the soil. The nose color of banded mongoose varies from gray-brown to orange-red.

An adult animal can reach a length of 30 to 45 cm and a weight of 1.5 to 2.25 kg. The tail is 15 to 30 cm long.

== Taxonomy ==
Viverra mungo was the scientific name proposed by Johann Friedrich Gmelin in 1788 for a mongoose that was described earlier by several other naturalists. In the 19th and 20th centuries, several naturalists described mongoose specimens and proposed subspecies:

- Adail banded mongoose, M. m. adailensis (Heuglin, 1861)
- Boror banded mongoose, M. m. bororensis (Roberts, 1929)
- North-west banded mongoose, M. m. caurinus (Thomas, 1926)
- East African banded mongoose, M. m. colonus (Heller, 1911)
- M. m. fasciatus (Desmarest, 1823)
- Namibia banded mongoose, M. m. grisonax (Thomas, 1926)
- Schwarz's banded mongoose, M. m. mandjarum (Schwarz, 1915)
- M. m. marcrurus (Thomas, 1907)
- Botswana banded mongoose, M. m. ngamiensis (Roberts, 1932)
- M. m. pallidipes (Roberts, 1929)
- M. m. rossi (Roberts, 1929)
- M. m. senescens (Thomas & Wroughton, 1907)
- M. m. somalicus (Thomas, 1895)
- Talbot's banded mongoose, M. m. talboti (Thomas & Wroughton, 1907)
- M. m. zebra (Rüppell, 1835)
- M. m. zebroides (Lönnberg, 1908)

== Distribution and habitat ==
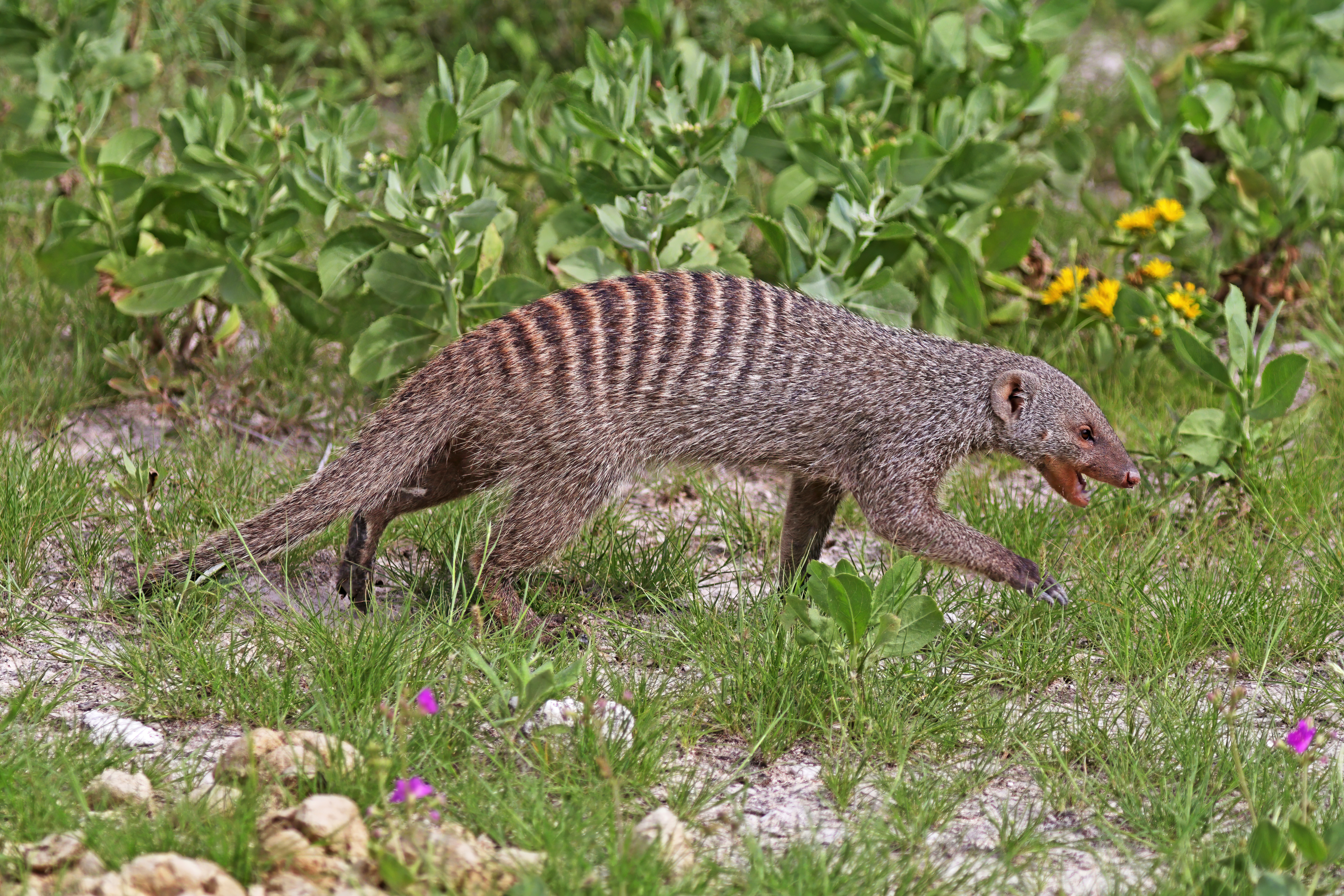
In Etosha National Park, Namibia

The banded mongoose is found in a large part of East, Southeast and South-Central Africa. There are also populations in the northern savannas of West Africa. The banded mongoose lives in savannas, open forests and grassland, especially near water, but also in dry, thorny bushland but not deserts. The species uses various types of dens for shelter, most commonly termite mounds. They will also live in rock shelters, thickets, gullies, and warrens under bushes. Mongooses prefer multi-entranced termitaria with open thicket, averaging 4 m from the nearest shelter, located in semi-closed woodland. In contrast to the den of the dwarf mongoose, banded mongoose dens are less dependent on vegetation cover and have more entrances. Banded mongooses live in larger groups than dwarf mongooses and thus more entrances means more members have access to the den and ventilation.

The banded mongoose lives in many of Africa's protected areas. The Serengeti of Tanzania, has a population density of around three mongooses per km^{2}. In southern KwaZulu-Natal, mongoose numbers are at a similar density at 2.4 km^{2}. Queen Elizabeth National Park has much higher banded mongoose densities at 18/km^{2}.

== Behaviour and ecology ==
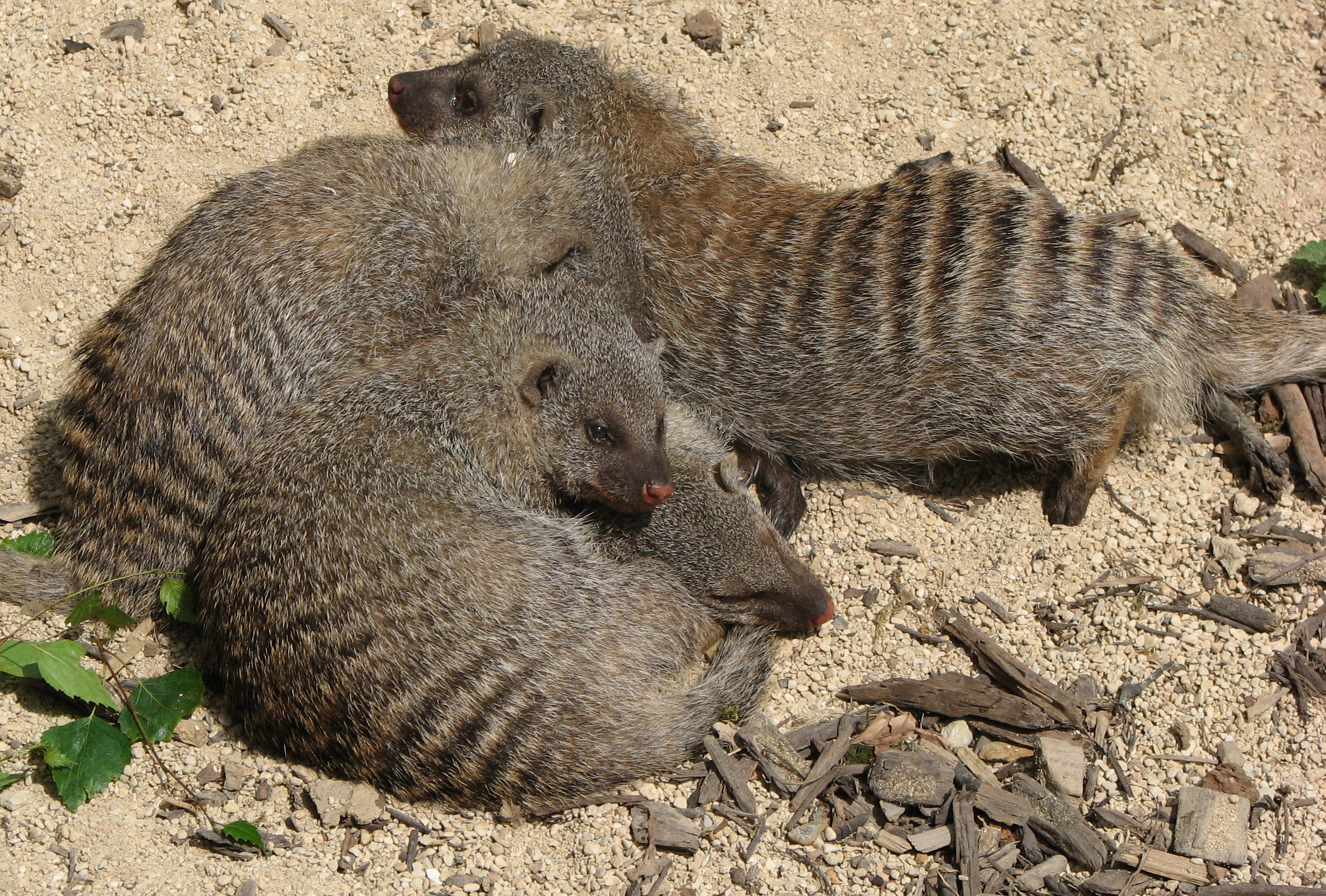
Family group

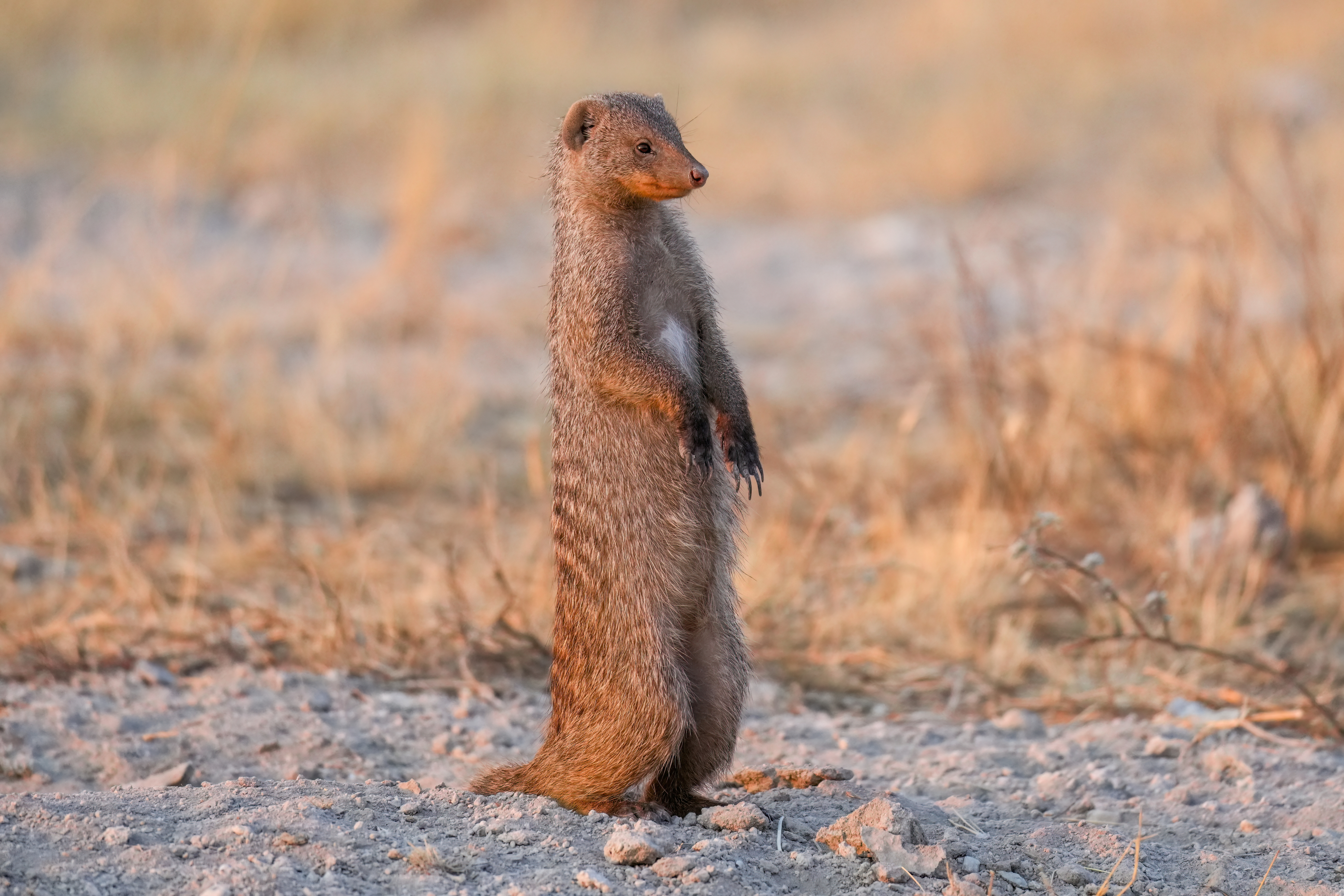
Standing in Etosha National Park

Banded mongooses live in mixed-sex groups of 5–75 individuals with an average of around 20 individuals. Groups sleep together at night in underground dens, often abandoned termite mounds, and change dens frequently (every 2–3 days). When no refuge is available and hard-pressed by predators such as African wild dogs, the group will form a compact arrangement in which they lie on each other with heads facing outwards and upwards. There is generally no strict hierarchy in mongoose groups. Most aggression and hierarchical behavior occurs between males when females are in oestrus. Males will mate-guard females in the group and attempt to control reproduction, but this practice is only minimally successful, with females tending to work against the mate-guarding male by proactively securing extra-pair copulations. Older females have earlier estrous periods and have larger litters. Older females are more desirable for males and will be the first females mate-guarded. When groups get too large, some females are forced out of the group by either older females or males. These females may form new groups with subordinate males. Relations between groups are highly aggressive and mongooses are sometimes killed and injured during intergroup encounters. Nevertheless, breeding females often mate with males from a rival groups during fights. Mongooses establish their territories with scent markings that may also serve as communication between those in the same group.

=== Hunting and diet ===
Banded mongooses feed primarily on insects, myriapods, small reptiles, and birds. Millipedes and beetles make up most of their diet, but they also commonly eat ants, crickets, termites, grasshoppers, caterpillars, earwigs and snails. Other prey items of the mongoose includes mice, rats, frogs, lizards, small snakes, ground birds and the eggs of both birds and reptiles. It will also eat vegetable matter in the form of wild fruits. On some occasions, mongooses will drink water from rain pools and lake shores.

Banded mongoose forage in groups, but each member searches for food alone; however they work as a team when dealing with venomous snakes such as cobras. They forage in the morning for several hours and then rest in the shade. They will usually forage again in the late afternoon. Mongooses use their sense of smell to locate their prey and dig them out with their long claws, both in holes in the ground and holes in trees. Mongoose will also frequent the dung of large herbivores since it attracts beetles. Low grunts are produced every few seconds for communication. When hunting prey that secrete toxins, mongooses will roll them on the ground. Durable prey is thrown on hard surfaces.

=== Reproduction ===
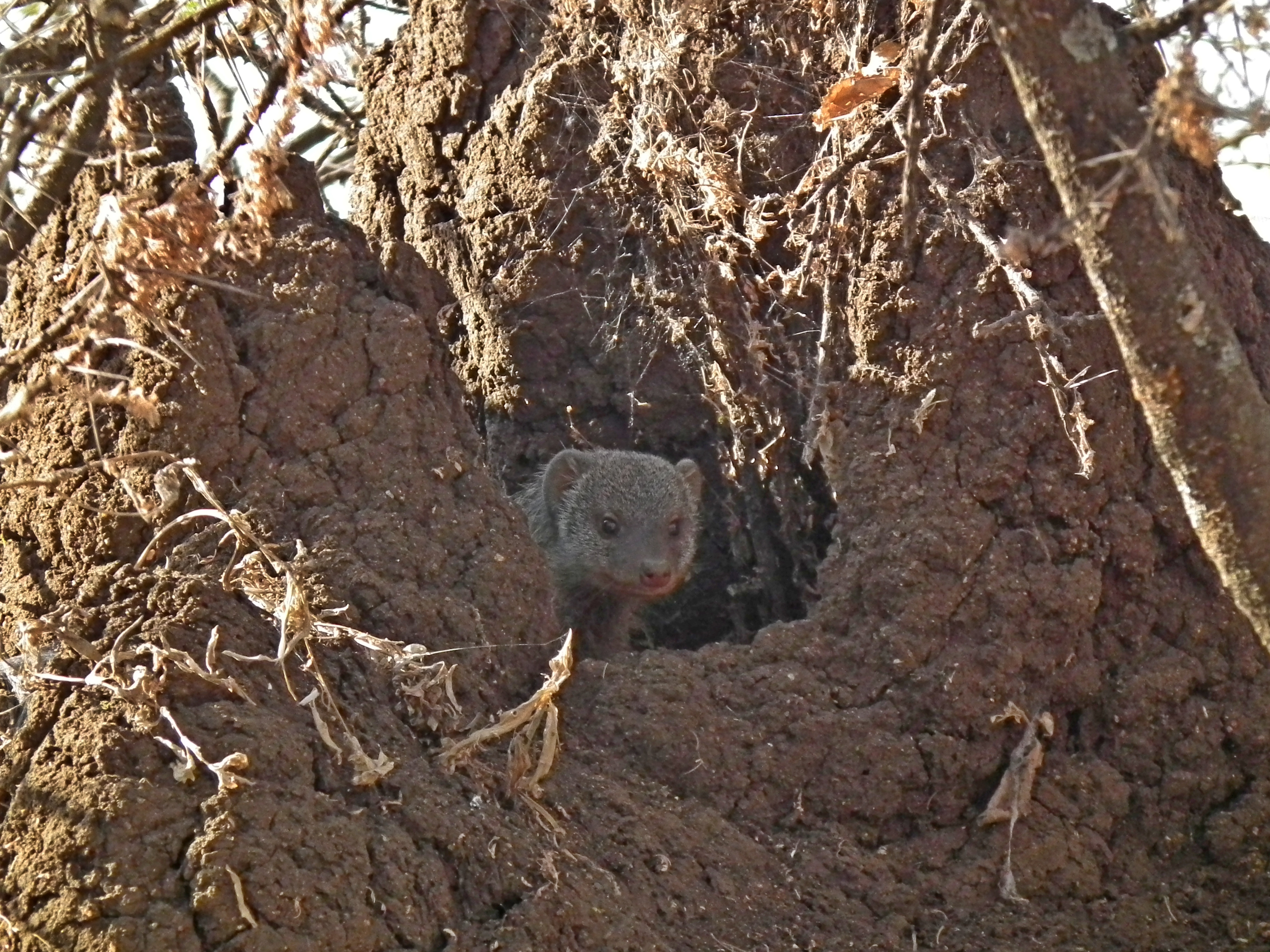
Peeking from a burrow entrance

Unlike in most other social mongoose species, all females in a banded mongoose group can breed. They all enter oestrus around 10 days after giving birth. Dominant males monitor the females and aggressively defend them from subordinates. While these males do most of the mating, the females often try to escape from them and mate with other males in the group, meaning dominant males do not have full control of the mating choices of females. A dominant male will spend 2–3 days guarding each female. A guarding male will snap at, lunge at or pounce on any males that come near. Gestation lasts 60–70 days. In most breeding attempts, all females give birth either on the same day or within a few days. Litters range from two to six pups and average four. For the first four weeks of life, pups stay in the dens, where many form an exclusive relationship with a single helper or escort, whose genetic relationship with a given pup is unknown. These helpers are generally young nonbreeding males or breeding females who have contributed to the current litter; they help to minimize competition over food allocation among pups. During this time they are guarded by these helpers while the other group member go on their foraging trips. After four weeks, the pups are able to go foraging themselves. Each pup is cared for by a single adult "escort" who helps the pup to find food and protects it from danger.

==== Inbreeding ====
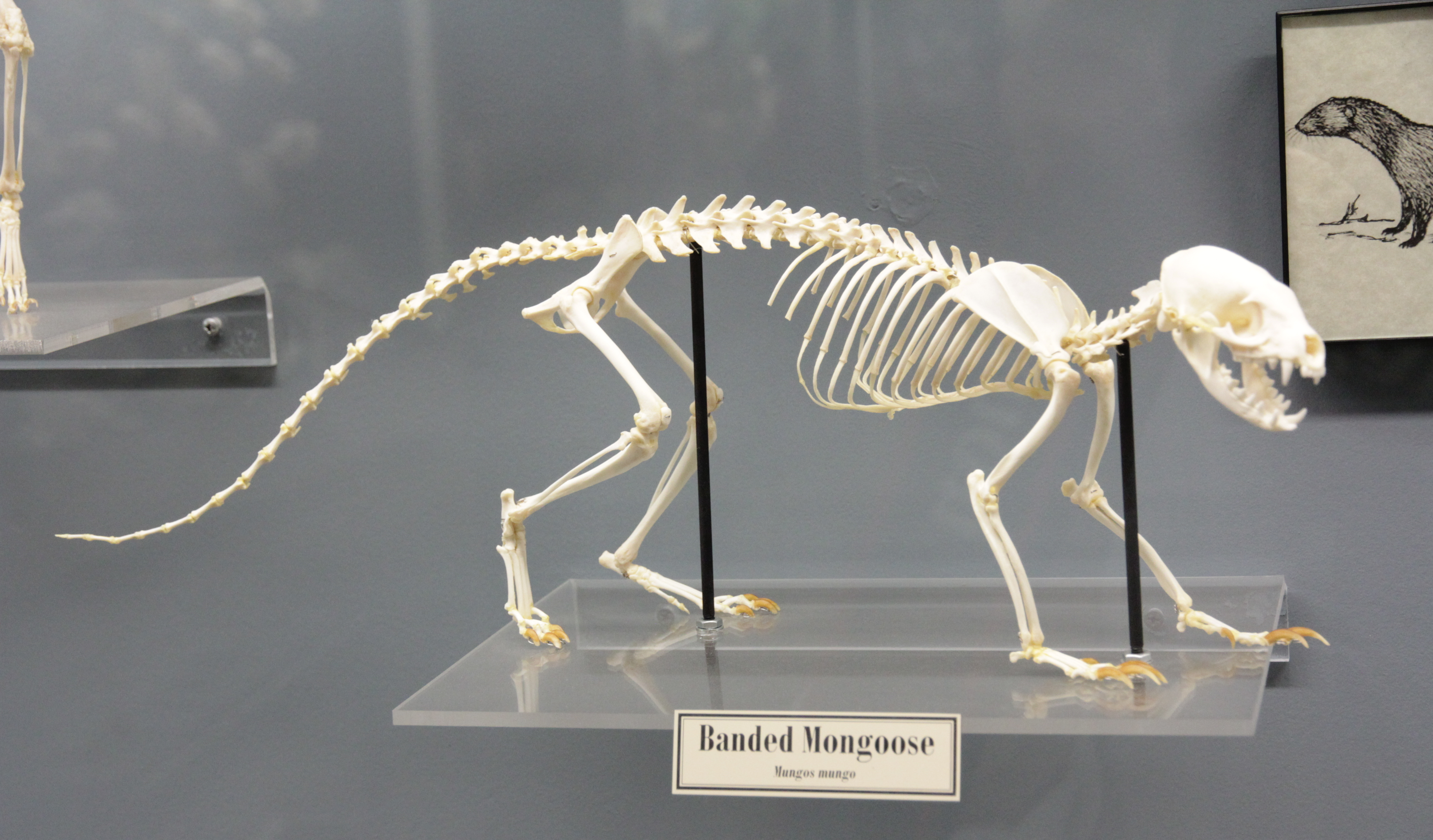
Banded mongoose skeleton in the Museum of Osteology

Few studies have found evidence of regular incest avoidance in mammals, but banded mongooses are an exception. Successfully breeding pairs were found to be less related than expected under random mating. Inbreeding depression is largely caused by the homozygous expression of deleterious recessive alleles. Inbreeding depression appears to occur in banded mongooses as indicated by a decline in progeny body mass with increasing inbreeding coefficient.

=== Interspecies relations ===
Banded mongooses have been observed removing ticks, fleas, and other parasites from warthogs in Kenya and Uganda.
