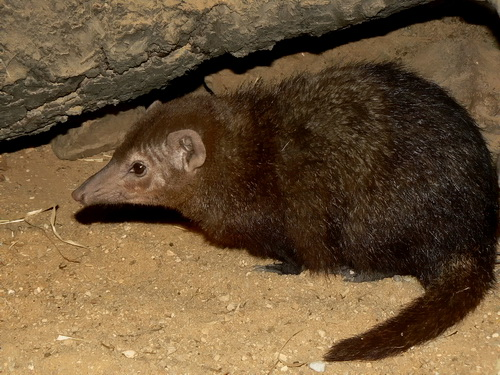

Conservation status
- Least Concern (IUCN 3.1)

Scientific classification
- Kingdom: Animalia
- Phylum: Chordata
- Class: Mammalia
- Order: Carnivora
- Family: Herpestidae
- Genus: Crossarchus
- Species: C. obscurus

Binomial name
- Crossarchus obscurus F. Cuvier, 1825
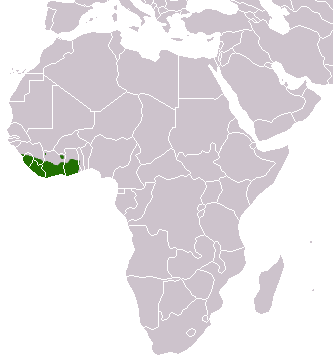
- Common kusimanse range

= Common kusimanse =

Species of dwarf mongoose from West Africa

The common kusimanse (Crossarchus obscurus), also called long-nosed kusimanse and kusimanse, is a small, diurnal member of the Mungotinae.

== Description ==
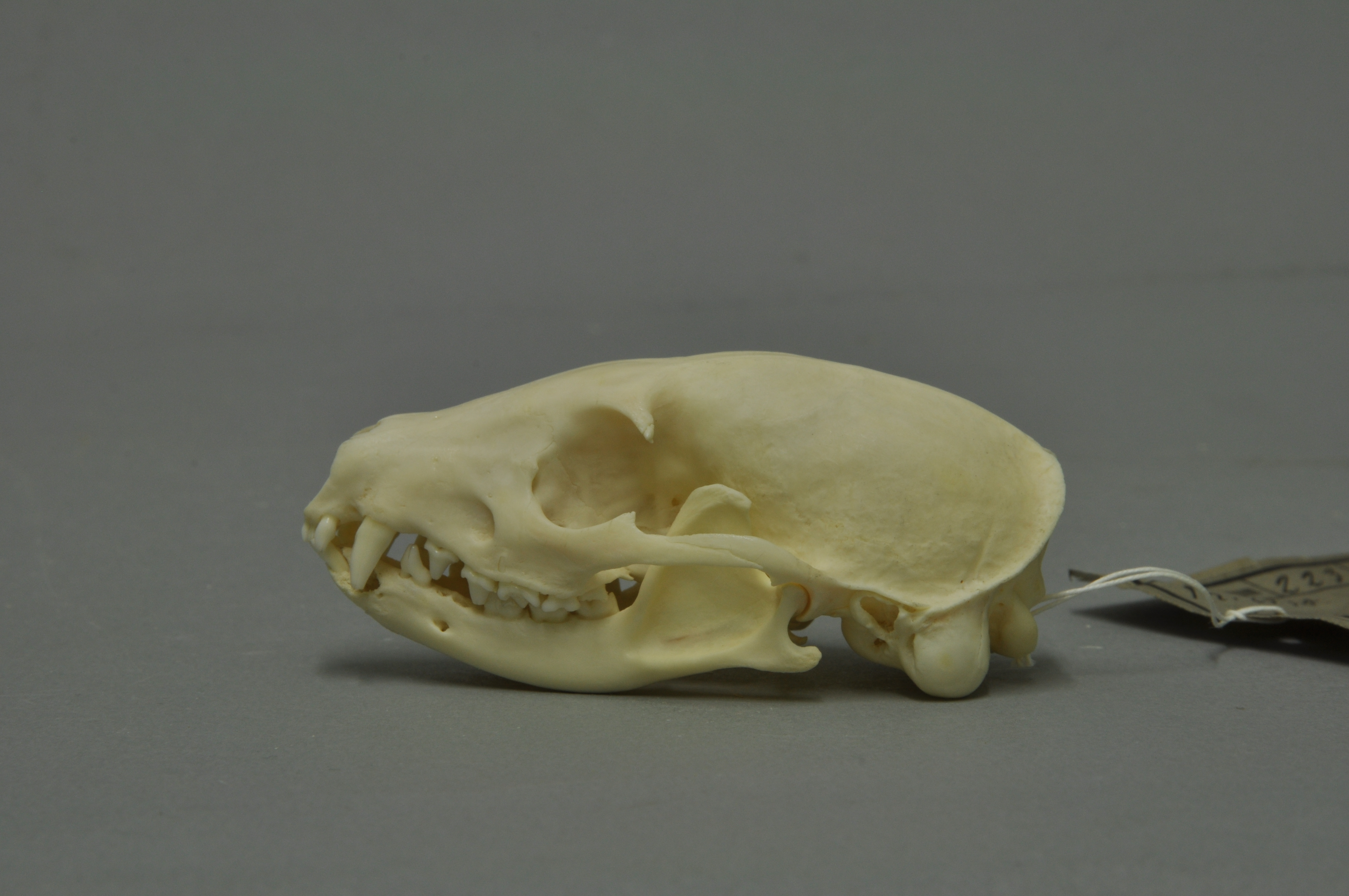
Skull of a common kusimanse

The common kusimanse has a vaguely weasel-shaped body with dark or reddish brown fur that is thick, with a wiry texture down the back, and fine and soft on the underside. It has a long snout, short legs, a short, relatively stiff tail which tapers to a point, long claws, small ears, small, dark colored eyes, and an elongated nose. Adult size is typically around 33 cm (13 in) with a weight of approximately 1 kg (2.2 lb).

== Behavior ==
This mongoose is a highly social animal which lives in a small family group of 10 to 20 or more individuals, with a strict hierarchical structure. The members of the family group communicate through various vocalizations including whistles, chirps and growls. The whistles are emitted for the purpose of maintaining contact in the dense rainforest understory while traveling.

It is capable of climbing, but tends to restrict most of its activities to the ground. It is very territorial, and will mark the group's territory with anal scent glands, and defend it vehemently against intruders, even those of a much larger size. It has a variety of threat displays which include various growls and snorts, as well as physical movements such as lunging, back arching, and hair erection. The group is nomadic, not spending much time in one particular area of their territory. As they move from place to place, they find shelter in tree hollows, other animal's burrows, or termite mounds.

As they do not occupy permanent den sites, the young are not able to keep up with the group for several weeks and must be carried to different foraging spots. Individuals in the group take turns carrying the young and also help to feed them.

== Distribution and habitat ==
The common kusimanse is found in the west African countries of Ghana, Ivory Coast, Benin, Liberia, and Sierra Leone, and it has been exported to various other countries for the pet trade.

It differs from other mongooses primarily in its choice of habitat, which is generally forested areas near water, whereas most species of mongoose tend to prefer open grasslands, or semi-arid brush. It can be found from sea level to elevations of 1000 m (3280 ft).

== Diet ==
Kusimanses are active foragers, and excellent diggers, which feed on a wide variety of things. Their diet is primarily carnivorous, consisting of insects, larvae, fresh water crabs, small reptiles, and small rodents. They have excellent eyesight and keen sense of smell, making them adept small prey hunters. They prefer to kill their prey with a single bite to the back of the neck. They will also consume various types of fruits and berries in small quantity.

Where kusimanses live near human populations, they are "seen as natural pesticides."

== Reproduction ==
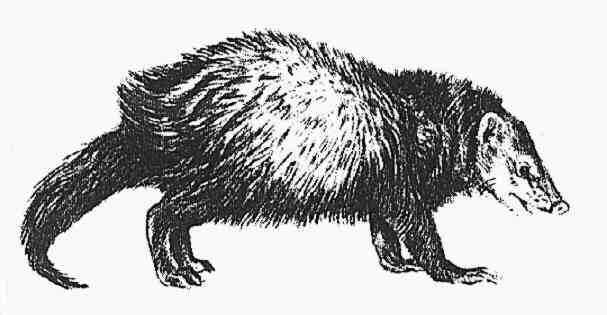
Drawing of Crossarchus obscurus.

Due to their hierarchical social structure, only the primary members of a family group are permitted to breed. Subordinate offspring are often killed and eaten by the more dominant members of the group. Sexual maturity is reached between nine months of age to a year old. Females go into estrus up to nine times a year. Males initiate and terminate copulation without much courting. Gestation is approximately eight weeks, and each litter averages 2–4 babies, though they have six mammae. Females are capable of having three litters per year. Babies are born about 13 mm (0.5 in) long with their eyes closed, and a thick undercoat of fur. After about twelve days, they begin to open their eyes and explore their environment. At around three weeks the mother weans them, their guard hairs begin to grow in, and they actively forage on their own. They do not grow to adult size until around 6–9 months of age. The life span of the common kusimanse in captivity is 10 years.

== In captivity ==
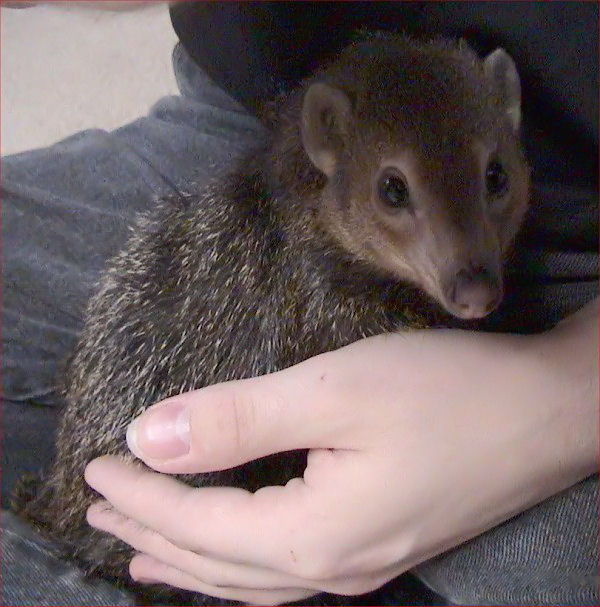
Tame common kusimanse sitting on a human lap.

Due to its ease of training, and social nature, the common kusimanse is commonly available in the exotic pet trade and is found in many zoos worldwide. It tends to become quite bonded to its owner, and does not interact well with any other kind of household pet. It is highly energetic, requiring a large amount of space to satiate its natural wandering instinct. Without it, it tends to pace and act out with aggression. Its dietary needs can be met with a mix of various things including commercially available crickets, mealworms, or mice, along with a quality cat food.

In captivity the risk of obesity is high, and care should be taken to assure its diet is varied, and that it gets an appropriate amount of exercise. It will often try to eat almost anything it is offered or that it comes across which seems even remotely edible, and will often become aggressive if what it perceives as a food item is taken away. Captive breeding is not commonplace, but has been done.

== Conservation status ==
The common kusimanse is not listed as threatened or endangered, and while no exact numbers of the wild population is known, is not considered to be at risk.
