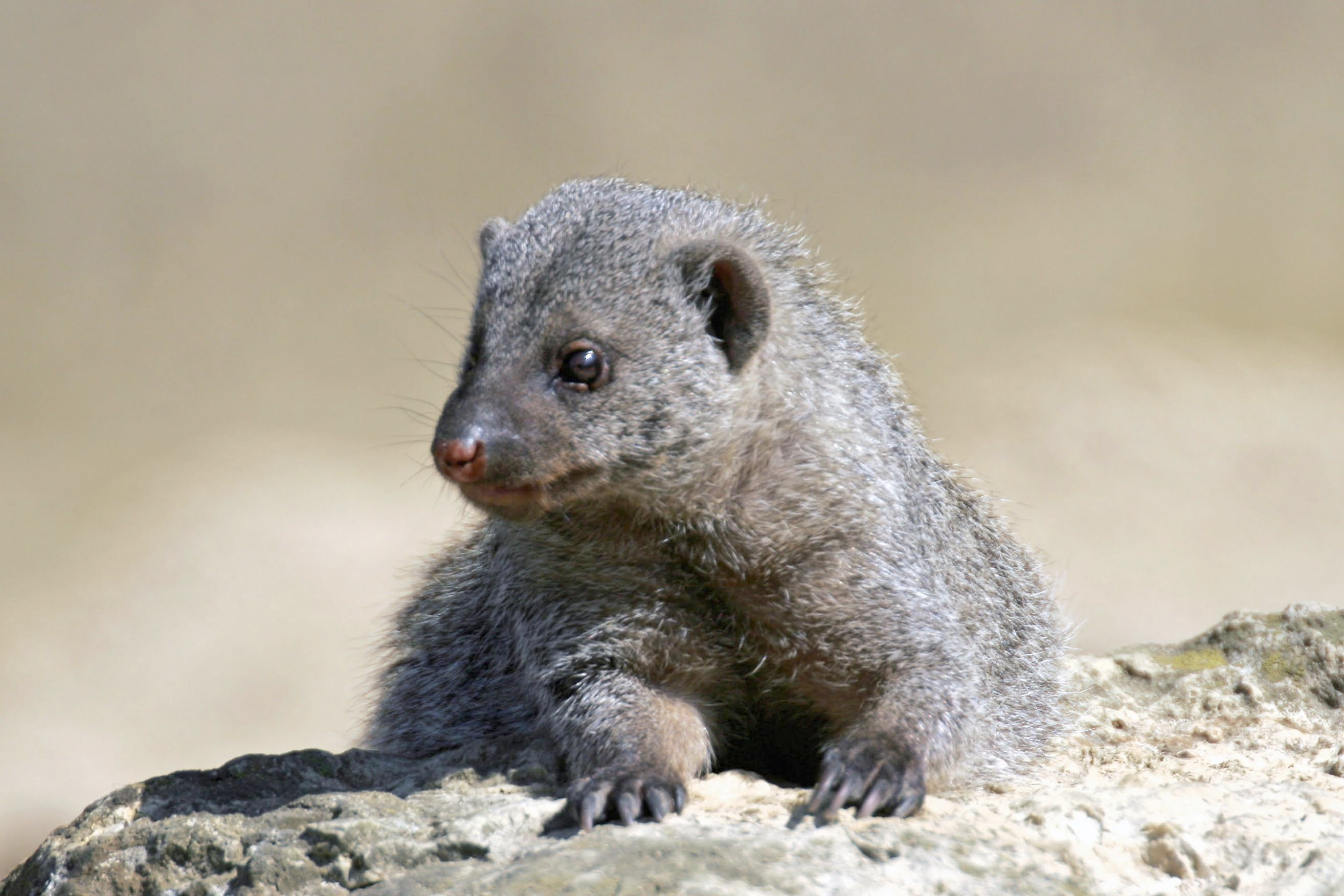
- Banded mongoose, Mungos mungo

Scientific classification
- Domain: Eukaryota
- Kingdom: Animalia
- Phylum: Chordata
- Class: Mammalia
- Order: Carnivora
- Suborder: Feliformia
- Family: Herpestidae
- Subfamily: Mungotinae
- Genus: Mungos; E. Geoffroy Saint-Hilaire & F. Cuvier, 1795

Type species
- Viverra mungo Gmelin, 1788

Species
- Mungos mungo; Mungos gambianus
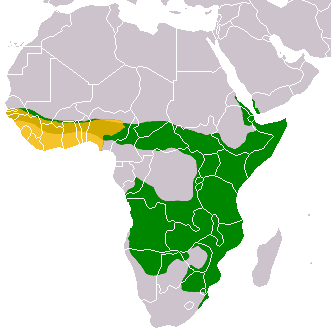
- range of M. mungo range of M. gambianus region of sympatry

= Mungos =

Genus of carnivores

Mungos is a mongoose genus that was proposed by Étienne Geoffroy Saint-Hilaire and Frédéric Cuvier in 1795.

The genus contains the following species:

Image	Name	Distribution
	Banded mongoose, M. mungo (Gmelin, 1788)	
	Gambian mongoose, M. gambianus (Ogilby, 1835)	
