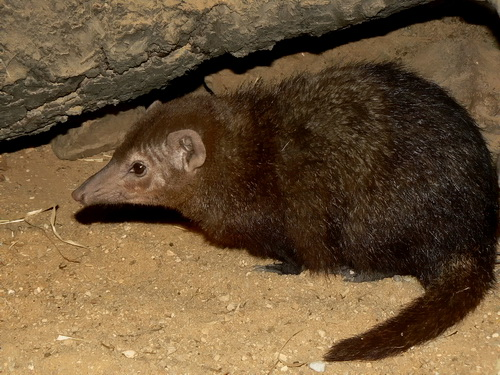
- Common kusimanse (C. obscurus)

Scientific classification
- Kingdom: Animalia
- Phylum: Chordata
- Class: Mammalia
- Infraclass: Placentalia
- Order: Carnivora
- Family: Herpestidae
- Subfamily: Mungotinae
- Genus: Crossarchus; F. Cuvier, 1825

Type species
- Crossarchus obscurus F. Cuvier, 1825

Species
- Crossarchus alexandri Crossarchus ansorgei Crossarchus obscurus Crossarchus platycephalus
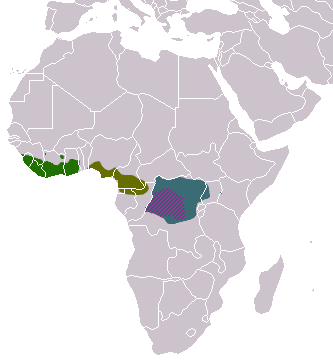
- Ranges of the four Crossarchus species C. obscurus C. platycephalus C. alexandri C. ansorgei

= Crossarchus =

Genus of carnivores

Crossarchus is a mongoose genus, commonly referred to as kusimanse, often cusimanse, mangue, or dwarf mongoose. They are placed in the subfamily Mungotinae, which are small, highly social mongooses.

== Distribution and habitat ==
Members of this genus are found in the swamplands and forests of central and western Africa, in the countries of Ghana, Ivory Coast, Liberia, and Sierra Leone.

== Species ==
Image	Scientific name	Common name	Distribution
	Crossarchus alexandri	Alexander's kusimanse	Democratic Republic of Congo and Uganda
	Crossarchus ansorgei	Angolan kusimanse	Democratic Republic of Congo, Angola
	Crossarchus obscurus	Common kusimanse	Ghana, Ivory Coast, Benin, Liberia, and Sierra Leone
	Crossarchus platycephalus	Flat-headed kusimanse	Benin, Cameroon and Nigeria

== Behaviour and ecology ==
Crossarchus live in groups of 10 to 24. One to three families live in a group. The families are made up of the mating pair and the young. They are diurnal, and will wander throughout their territories constantly, never staying in one place too long. In their wanderings they will create temporary shelters for themselves. As they do not occupy permanent den sites, the young are not able to keep up with the group for several weeks and must be carried to different foraging spots. Individuals in the group take turns carrying the young from place to place and also help feed them. Since the sociable kusimanses do not live in open habitat, they maintain contact in the dense rainforest understory by giving constant whistling calls while traveling.

In most areas where members of Crossarchus live, they are the numerically dominant members of the forest carnivore community.
