= List of mammals of Namibia =

This is a list of the mammal species recorded in Namibia. Of the mammal species in Namibia, one is critically endangered, four are endangered, five are vulnerable, and seven are near threatened.

The following tags are used to highlight each species' conservation status as assessed by the International Union for Conservation of Nature:

EX	Extinct	No reasonable doubt that the last individual has died.
EW	Extinct in the wild	Known only to survive in captivity or as a naturalized populations well outside its previous range.
CR	Critically endangered	The species is in imminent risk of extinction in the wild.
EN	Endangered	The species is facing an extremely high risk of extinction in the wild.
VU	Vulnerable	The species is facing a high risk of extinction in the wild.
NT	Near threatened	The species does not meet any of the criteria that would categorise it as risking extinction but it is likely to do so in the future.
LC	Least concern	There are no current identifiable risks to the species.
DD	Data deficient	There is inadequate information to make an assessment of the risks to this species.

Some species were assessed using an earlier set of criteria. Species assessed using this system have the following instead of near threatened and least concern categories:

LR/cd	Lower risk/conservation dependent	Species which were the focus of conservation programmes and may have moved into a higher risk category if that programme was discontinued.
LR/nt	Lower risk/near threatened	Species which are close to being classified as vulnerable but are not the subject of conservation programmes.
LR/lc	Lower risk/least concern	Species for which there are no identifiable risks.

== Order: Afrosoricida (tenrecs and golden moles) ==
The order Afrosoricida contains the golden moles of southern Africa and the tenrecs of Madagascar and Africa, two families of small mammals that were traditionally part of the order Insectivora.

- Family: Chrysochloridae
  - Subfamily: Chrysochlorinae
    - Genus: Eremitalpa
      - Grant's golden mole, Eremitalpa granti NT

== Order: Macroscelidea (elephant shrews) ==
Often called sengis, the elephant shrews or jumping shrews are native to southern Africa. Their common English name derives from their elongated flexible snout and their resemblance to the true shrews.

- Family: Macroscelididae (elephant shrews)
  - Genus: Elephantulus
    - Short-snouted elephant shrew, Elephantulus brachyrhynchus LC
    - Bushveld elephant shrew, Elephantulus intufi LC
    - Western rock elephant shrew, Elephantulus rupestris LC
  - Genus: Macroscelides
    - Namib round-eared elephant shrew, Macroscelides flavicaudatus
    - Short-eared elephant shrew, Macroscelides proboscideus LC
    - Etendeka round-eared elephant shrew Macroscelides micus
  - Genus: Petrodromus
    - Four-toed elephant shrew, Petrodromus tetradactylus LC

== Order: Tubulidentata (aardvarks) ==
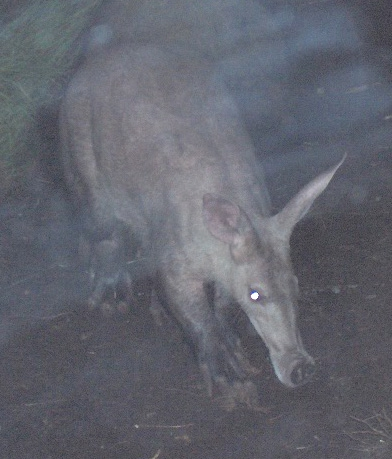
Aardvark

The order Tubulidentata consists of a single species, the aardvark. Tubulidentata are characterised by their teeth which lack a pulp cavity and form thin tubes which are continuously worn down and replaced.

- Family: Orycteropodidae
  - Genus: Orycteropus
    - Aardvark, O. afer LC

== Order: Hyracoidea (hyraxes) ==
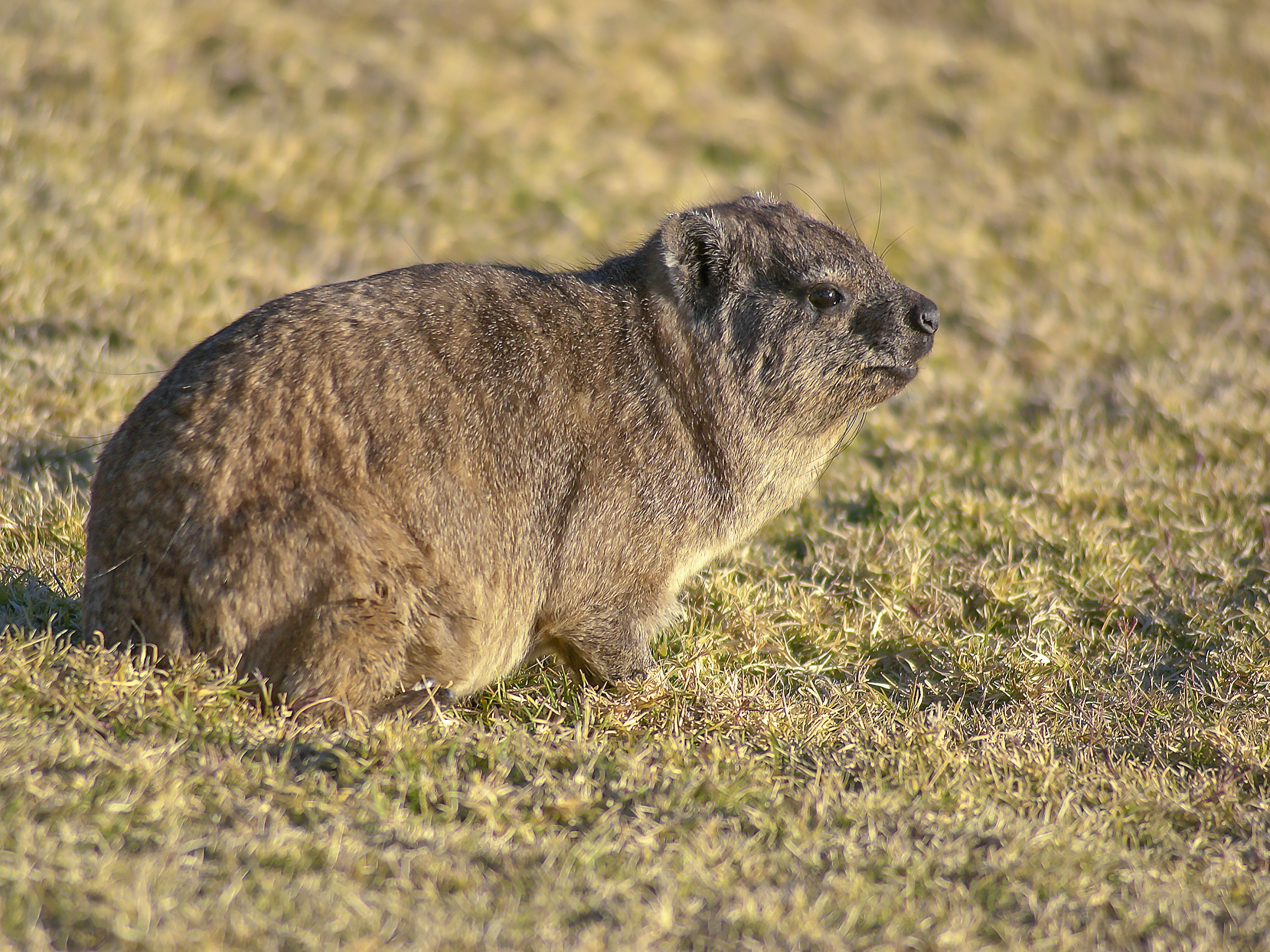
Cape hyrax

The hyraxes are any of four species of fairly small, thickset, herbivorous mammals in the order Hyracoidea. About the size of a domestic cat they are well-furred, with rounded bodies and a stumpy tail. They are native to Africa and the Middle East.

- Family: Procaviidae (hyraxes)
  - Genus: Procavia
    - Cape hyrax, P. capensis LC

== Order: Proboscidea (elephants) ==
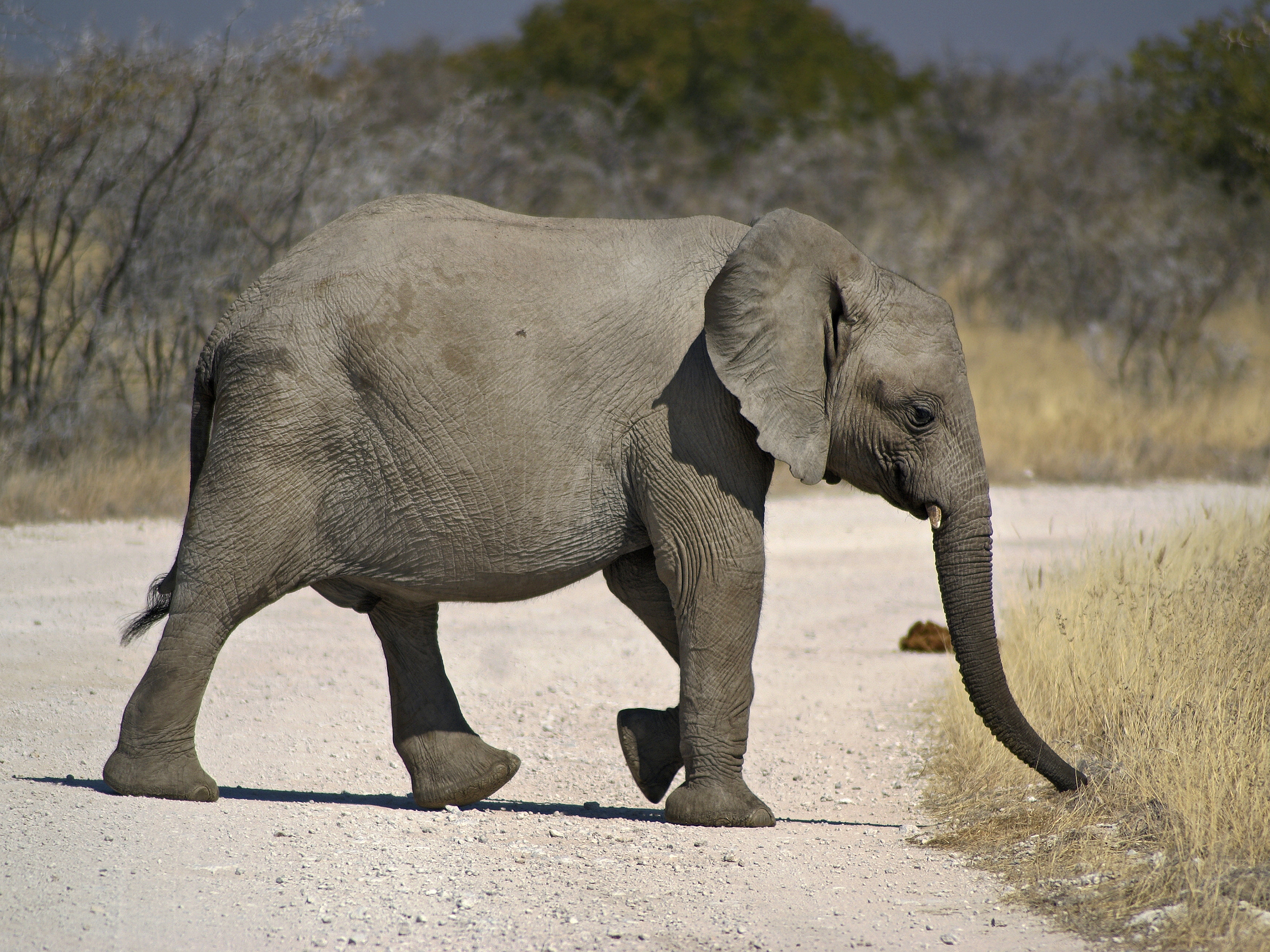
African bush elephant

The elephants comprise three living species and are the largest living land animals.

- Family: Elephantidae (elephants)
  - Genus: Loxodonta
    - African bush elephant, L. africana EN

== Order: Primates ==
The order Primates contains humans and their closest relatives: lemurs, lorisoids, tarsiers, monkeys, and apes.

- Suborder: Strepsirrhini
  - Infraorder: Lemuriformes
    - Superfamily: Lorisoidea
      - Family: Galagidae
        - Genus: Galago
          - Mohol bushbaby, Galago moholi LR/lc
- Suborder: Haplorhini
  - Infraorder: Simiiformes
    - Parvorder: Catarrhini
      - Superfamily: Cercopithecoidea
        - Family: Cercopithecidae (Old World monkeys)
          - Genus: Chlorocebus
            - Malbrouck, Chlorocebus cynosuros LR/lc
            - Vervet monkey, Chlorocebus pygerythrus LR/lc
          - Genus: Papio
            - Chacma baboon, Papio ursinus LR/lc

== Order: Rodentia (rodents) ==
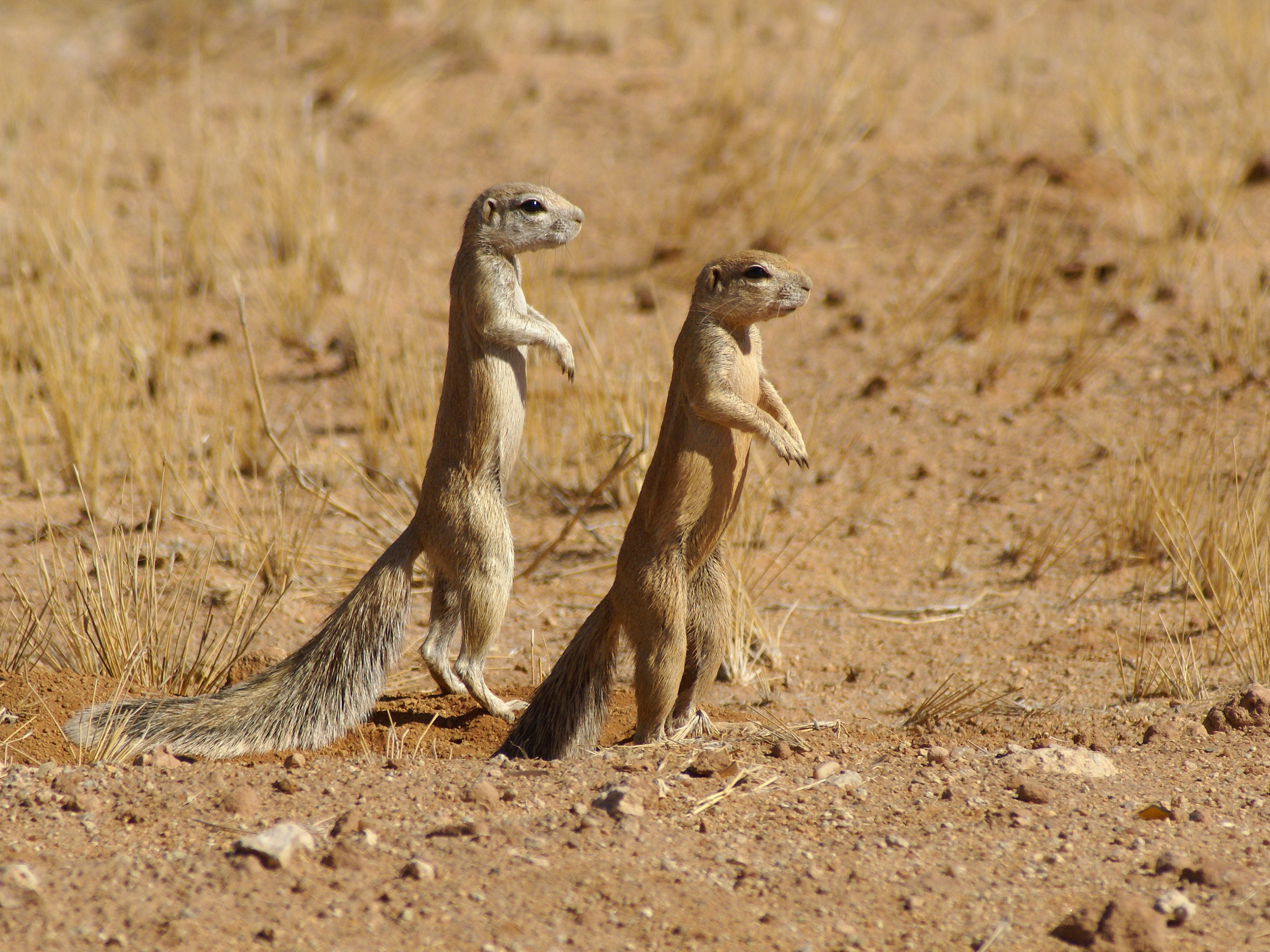
South African ground squirrel

Rodents make up the largest order of mammals, with over 40% of mammalian species. They have two incisors in the upper and lower jaw which grow continually and must be kept short by gnawing. Most rodents are small though the capybara can weigh up to 45 kg (100 lb).

- Suborder: Hystricognathi
  - Family: Bathyergidae
    - Genus: Bathyergus
      - Namaqua dune mole-rat, Bathyergus janetta LC
    - Genus: Cryptomys
      - Bocage's mole-rat, Cryptomys bocagei DD
      - Damaraland mole-rat, Cryptomys damarensis LC
  - Family: Hystricidae (Old World porcupines)
    - Genus: Hystrix
      - Cape porcupine, Hystrix africaeaustralis LC
  - Family: Petromuridae
    - Genus: Petromus
      - Dassie rat, Petromus typicus LC
  - Family: Thryonomyidae (cane rats)
    - Genus: Thryonomys
      - Greater cane rat, Thryonomys swinderianus LC
- Suborder: Sciurognathi
  - Family: Pedetidae (springhare)
    - Genus: Pedetes
      - South African springhare, Pedetes capensis LC
  - Family: Sciuridae (squirrels)
    - Subfamily: Xerinae
      - Tribe: Xerini
        - Genus: Xerus
          - South African ground squirrel, Xerus inauris LC
          - Mountain ground squirrel, Xerus princeps LC
      - Tribe: Protoxerini
        - Genus: Funisciurus
          - Congo rope squirrel, Funisciurus congicus LC
        - Genus: Paraxerus
          - Smith's bush squirrel, Paraxerus cepapi LC
  - Family: Gliridae (dormice)
    - Subfamily: Graphiurinae
      - Genus: Graphiurus
        - Small-eared dormouse, Graphiurus microtis LC
        - Stone dormouse, Graphiurus rupicola LC
  - Family: Nesomyidae
    - Subfamily: Petromyscinae
      - Genus: Petromyscus
        - Pygmy rock mouse, Petromyscus collinus LC
        - Brukkaros pygmy rock mouse, Petromyscus monticularis LC
        - Shortridge's rock mouse, Petromyscus shortridgei LC
    - Subfamily: Dendromurinae
      - Genus: Dendromus
        - Gray climbing mouse, Dendromus melanotis LC
        - Brants's climbing mouse, Dendromus mesomelas LC
      - Genus: Malacothrix
        - Gerbil mouse, Malacothrix typica LC
      - Genus: Steatomys
        - Kreb's fat mouse, Steatomys krebsii LC
        - Tiny fat mouse, Steatomys parvus LC
        - Fat mouse, Steatomys pratensis LC
    - Subfamily: Cricetomyinae
      - Genus: Saccostomus
        - South African pouched mouse, Saccostomus campestris LC
  - Family: Muridae (mice, rats, voles, gerbils, hamsters, etc.)
      - Genus: Myotomys
        - Bush vlei rat, Myotomys unisulcatus LC
    - Subfamily: Otomyinae
      - Genus: Otomys
        - Large vlei rat, Otomys maximus LC
      - Genus: Parotomys
        - Brants's whistling rat, Parotomys brantsii LC
        - Littledale's whistling rat, Parotomys littledalei LC
    - Subfamily: Gerbillinae
      - Genus: Desmodillus
        - Cape short-eared gerbil, Desmodillus auricularis LC
      - Genus: Gerbillurus
        - Hairy-footed gerbil, Gerbillurus paeba LC
        - Namib brush-tailed gerbil, Gerbillurus setzeri LC
        - Dune hairy-footed gerbil, Gerbillurus tytonis LC
        - Bushy-tailed hairy-footed gerbil, Gerbillurus vallinus LC
      - Genus: Tatera
        - Highveld gerbil, Tatera brantsii LC
        - Bushveld gerbil, Tatera leucogaster LC
    - Subfamily: Murinae
      - Genus: Aethomys
        - Red rock rat, Aethomys chrysophilus LC
        - Namaqua rock rat, Aethomys namaquensis LC
      - Genus: Dasymys
        - Angolan marsh rat, Dasymys nudipes NT
      - Genus: Lemniscomys
        - Single-striped grass mouse, Lemniscomys rosalia LC
      - Genus: Mastomys
        - Southern multimammate mouse, Mastomys coucha LC
        - Natal multimammate mouse, Mastomys natalensis LC
        - Shortridge's multimammate mouse, Mastomys shortridgei LC
      - Genus: Mus
        - Desert pygmy mouse, Mus indutus LC
        - African pygmy mouse, Mus minutoides LC
        - Setzer's pygmy mouse, Mus setzeri LC
      - Genus: Pelomys
        - Creek groove-toothed swamp rat, Pelomys fallax LC
      - Genus: Rhabdomys
        - Four-striped grass mouse, Rhabdomys pumilio LC
      - Genus: Thallomys
        - Black-tailed tree rat, Thallomys nigricauda LC
        - Acacia rat, Thallomys paedulcus LC
      - Genus: Zelotomys
        - Woosnam's broad-headed mouse, Zelotomys woosnami LC

== Order: Lagomorpha (lagomorphs) ==
The lagomorphs comprise two families, Leporidae (hares and rabbits), and Ochotonidae (pikas). Though they can resemble rodents, and were classified as a superfamily in that order until the early 20th century, they have since been considered a separate order. They differ from rodents in a number of physical characteristics, such as having four incisors in the upper jaw rather than two.

- Family: Leporidae (rabbits, hares)
  - Genus: Pronolagus
    - Jameson's red rock hare, Pronolagus randensis LR/lc
    - Smith's red rock hare, Pronolagus rupestris LR/lc
  - Genus: Lepus
    - Cape hare, Lepus capensis LR/lc
    - African savanna hare, Lepus microtis LR/lc
    - Scrub hare, Lepus saxatilis LR/lc

== Order: Erinaceomorpha (hedgehogs and gymnures) ==
The order Erinaceomorpha contains a single family, Erinaceidae, which comprises the hedgehogs and gymnures. The hedgehogs are easily recognised by their spines while gymnures look more like large rats.

- Family: Erinaceidae (hedgehogs)
  - Subfamily: Erinaceinae
    - Genus: Atelerix
      - Southern African hedgehog, Atelerix frontalis LR/lc

== Order: Soricomorpha (shrews, moles, and solenodons) ==
The "shrew-forms" are insectivorous mammals. The shrews and solenodons closely resemble mice while the moles are stout-bodied burrowers.

- Family: Soricidae (shrews)
  - Subfamily: Crocidurinae
    - Genus: Crocidura
      - Reddish-gray musk shrew, Crocidura cyanea LC
      - Bicolored musk shrew, Crocidura fuscomurina LC
      - Lesser red musk shrew, Crocidura hirta LC
      - Swamp musk shrew, Crocidura mariquensis LC
      - African giant shrew, Crocidura olivieri LC
    - Genus: Suncus
      - Greater dwarf shrew, Suncus lixus LC

== Order: Chiroptera (bats) ==
The bats' most distinguishing feature is that their forelimbs are developed as wings, making them the only mammals capable of flight. Bat species account for about 20% of all mammals.

- Family: Pteropodidae (flying foxes, Old World fruit bats)
  - Subfamily: Pteropodinae
    - Genus: Eidolon
      - Straw-coloured fruit bat, Eidolon helvum LC
    - Genus: Epomophorus
      - Angolan epauletted fruit bat, Epomophorus angolensis NT
      - Peters's epauletted fruit bat, Epomophorus crypturus LC
- Family: Vespertilionidae
  - Subfamily: Myotinae
    - Genus: Cistugo
      - Angolan hairy bat, Cistugo seabrai NT
  - Subfamily: Vespertilioninae
    - Genus: Eptesicus
      - Long-tailed house bat, Eptesicus hottentotus LC
    - Genus: Glauconycteris
      - Butterfly bat, Glauconycteris variegata LC
    - Genus: Laephotis
      - Botswanan long-eared bat, Laephotis botswanae LC
      - Namib long-eared bat, Laephotis namibensis LC
    - Genus: Neoromicia
      - Cape serotine, Neoromicia capensis LC
      - Banana pipistrelle, Neoromicia nanus LC
      - Somali serotine, Neoromicia somalicus LC
      - Zulu serotine, Neoromicia zuluensis LC
    - Genus: Nycticeinops
      - Schlieffen's bat, Nycticeinops schlieffeni LC
    - Genus: Pipistrellus
      - Rusty pipistrelle, Pipistrellus rusticus LC
    - Genus: Scotophilus
      - African yellow bat, Scotophilus dinganii LC
      - White-bellied yellow bat, Scotophilus leucogaster LC
      - Greenish yellow bat, Scotophilus viridis LC
  - Subfamily: Miniopterinae
    - Genus: Miniopterus
      - Greater long-fingered bat, Miniopterus inflatus LC
      - Natal long-fingered bat, Miniopterus natalensis NT
- Family: Molossidae
  - Genus: Chaerephon
    - Nigerian free-tailed bat, Chaerephon nigeriae LC
  - Genus: Mops
    - Angolan free-tailed bat, Mops condylurus LC
    - Midas free-tailed bat, Mops midas LC
  - Genus: Sauromys
    - Roberts's flat-headed bat, Sauromys petrophilus LC
  - Genus: Tadarida
    - Egyptian free-tailed bat, Tadarida aegyptiaca LC
- Family: Emballonuridae
  - Genus: Taphozous
    - Mauritian tomb bat, Taphozous mauritianus LC
- Family: Nycteridae
  - Genus: Nycteris
    - Hairy slit-faced bat, Nycteris hispida LC
    - Egyptian slit-faced bat, Nycteris thebaica LC
- Family: Rhinolophidae
  - Subfamily: Rhinolophinae
    - Genus: Rhinolophus
      - Geoffroy's horseshoe bat, Rhinolophus clivosus LC
      - Darling's horseshoe bat, Rhinolophus darlingi LC
      - Dent's horseshoe bat, Rhinolophus denti DD
      - Rüppell's horseshoe bat, Rhinolophus fumigatus LC
  - Subfamily: Hipposiderinae
    - Genus: Hipposideros
      - Sundevall's roundleaf bat, Hipposideros caffer LC
      - Commerson's roundleaf bat, Hipposideros marungensis NT

== Order: Pholidota (pangolins) ==
The order Pholidota comprises the eight species of pangolin. Pangolins are anteaters and have the powerful claws, elongated snout and long tongue seen in the other unrelated anteater species.

- Family: Manidae
  - Genus: Manis
    - Ground pangolin, Manis temminckii LR/nt

== Order: Cetacea (whales) ==
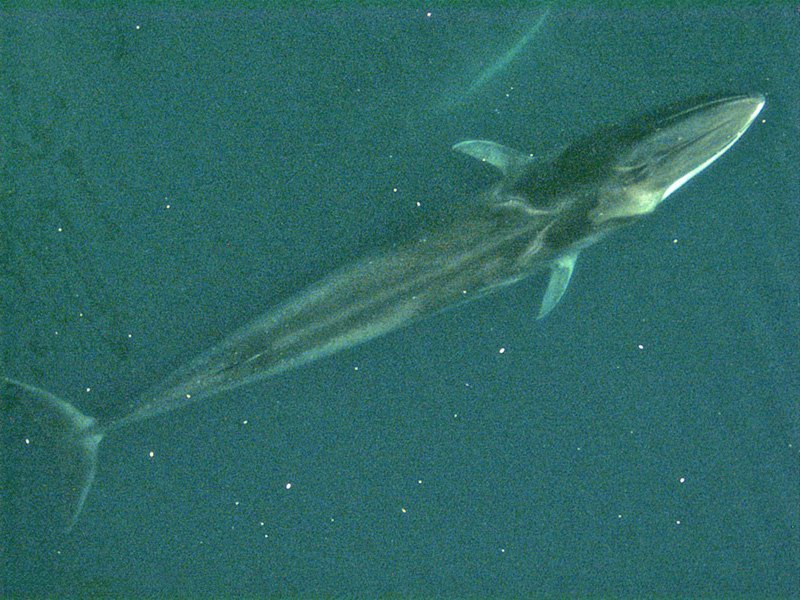
Fin whale

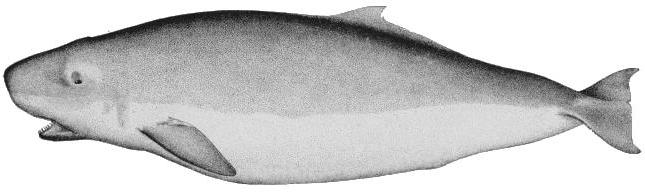
Pygmy sperm whale

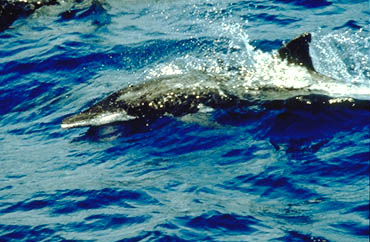
Rough-toothed dolphin

Orcas

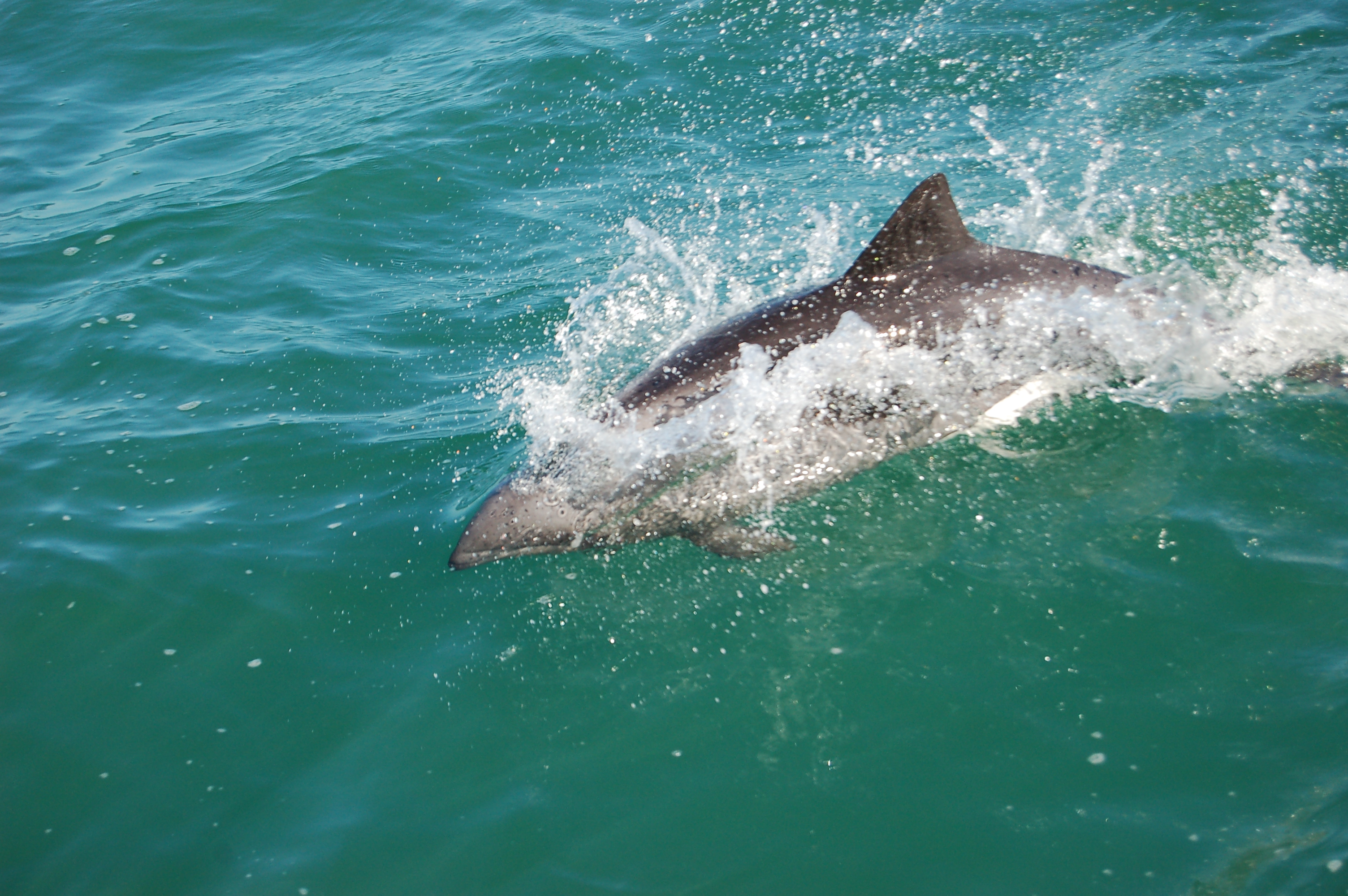
Haviside's dolphin off Luderitz

The order Cetacea includes whales, dolphins and porpoises. They are the mammals most fully adapted to aquatic life with a spindle-shaped nearly hairless body, protected by a thick layer of blubber, and forelimbs and tail modified to provide propulsion underwater.

- Suborder: Mysticeti
  - Family: Balaenopteridae
    - Subfamily: Balaenopterinae
      - Genus: Balaenoptera
        - Southern blue whale, Balaenoptera musculus intermedia EN
        - Southern fin whale, Balaenoptera physalus quoyi EN
        - Southern sei whale, Balaenoptera borealis schlegelii EN
        - Bryde's whale, Balaenoptera edeni DD
        - Common minke whale, Balaenoptera acutorostrata DD
        - Antarctic minke whale, Balaenoptera bonaerensis DD
      - Genus: Megaptera
        - Humpback whale, Megaptera novaeangliae LC
  - Family: Cetotheriidae
    - Subfamily: Neobalaeninae
      - Genus: Caperea
        - Pygmy right whale Caperea marginata DD
  - Family: Balaenidae
    - Genus: Eubalaena
      - Southern right whale, Eubalaena australis LC (still in small numbers in Namibia)
- Suborder: Odontoceti
  - Family: Physeteridae
    - Genus: Physeter
      - Sperm whale, Physeter catodon VU
  - Superfamily: Platanistoidea
    - Family: Kogiidae
      - Genus: Kogia
        - Pygmy sperm whale, Kogia breviceps LR/lc
        - Dwarf sperm whale, Kogia sima LR/lc
    - Family: Ziphidae
      - Genus: Ziphius
        - Cuvier's beaked whale, Ziphius cavirostris DD
      - Subfamily: Hyperoodontinae
        - Genus: Mesoplodon
          - Blainville's beaked whale, Mesoplodon densirostris DD
          - Gray's beaked whale, Mesoplodon grayi DD
          - Hector's beaked whale, Mesoplodon hectori DD
          - Strap-toothed whale, Mesoplodon layardii DD
    - Family: Delphinidae (marine dolphins)
      - Genus: Cephalorhynchus
        - Heaviside's dolphin, Cephalorhynchus heavisidii DD
      - Genus: Steno
        - Rough-toothed dolphin, Steno bredanensis DD
      - Genus: Tursiops
        - Common bottlenose dolphin, Tursiops truncatus DD
      - Genus: Stenella
        - Pantropical spotted dolphin, Stenella attenuata DD
        - Atlantic spotted dolphin, Stenella frontalis DD
        - Striped dolphin, Stenella coeruleoalba DD
        - Spinner dolphin, Stenella longirostris LR/cd
      - Genus: Lagenodelphis
        - Fraser's dolphin, Lagenodelphis hosei DD
      - Genus: Lissodelphis
        - Southern right whale dolphin, Lissodelphis peronii DD
      - Genus: Sagmatias
        - Dusky dolphin, Sagmatias obscurus DD
      - Genus: Grampus
        - Risso's dolphin, Grampus griseus DD
      - Genus: Feresa
        - Pygmy killer whale, Feresa attenuata DD
      - Genus: Pseudorca
        - False killer whale, Pseudorca crassidens DD
      - Genus: Orcinus
        - Orca, Orcinus orca LR/cd
      - Genus: Globicephala
        - Long-finned pilot whale, Globicephala melas DD
        - Short-finned pilot whale, Globicephala macrorhyncus DD
      - Genus: Peponocephala
        - Melon-headed whale, Peponocephala electra DD

== Order: Carnivora (carnivorans) ==
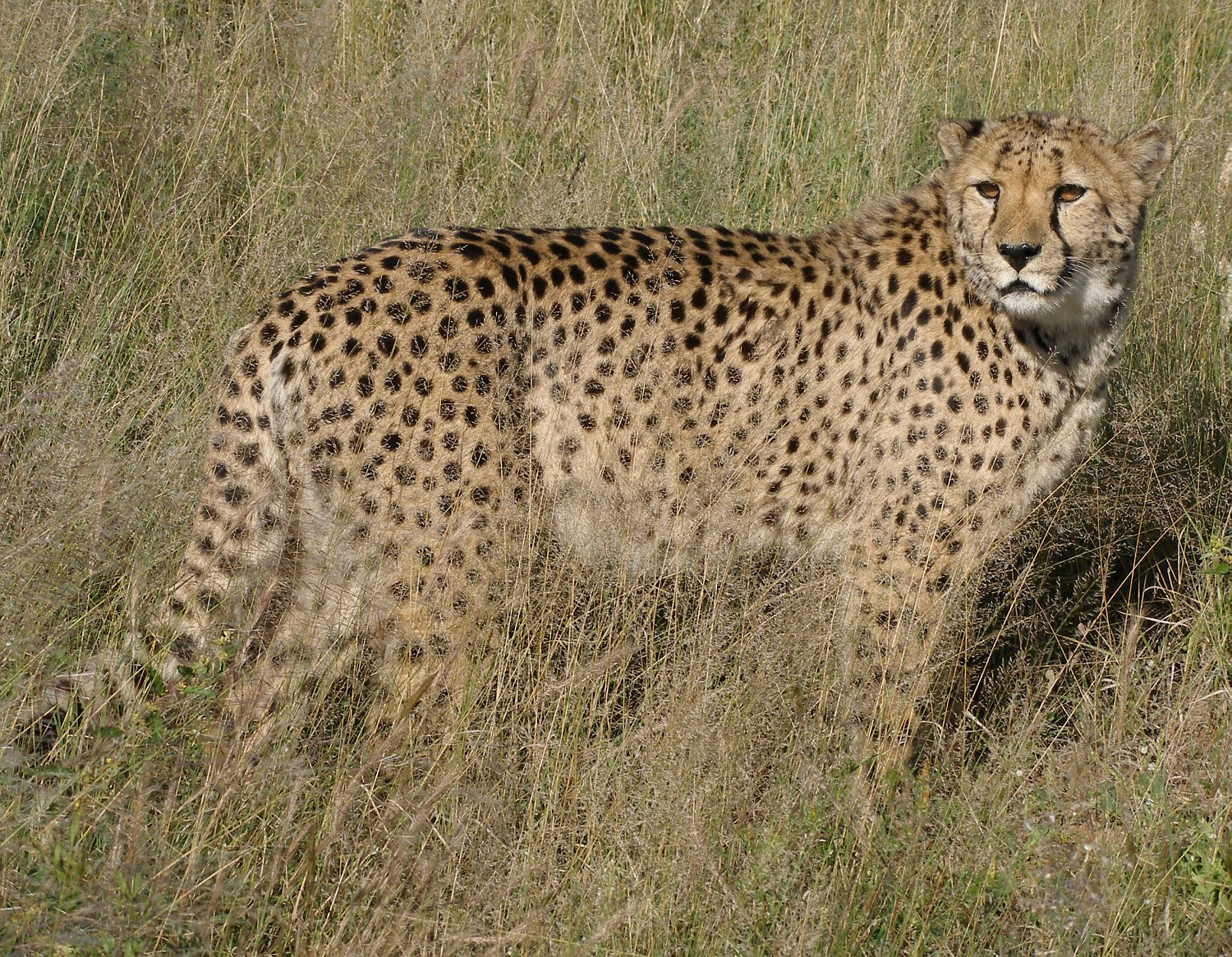
Cheetah in Namibia

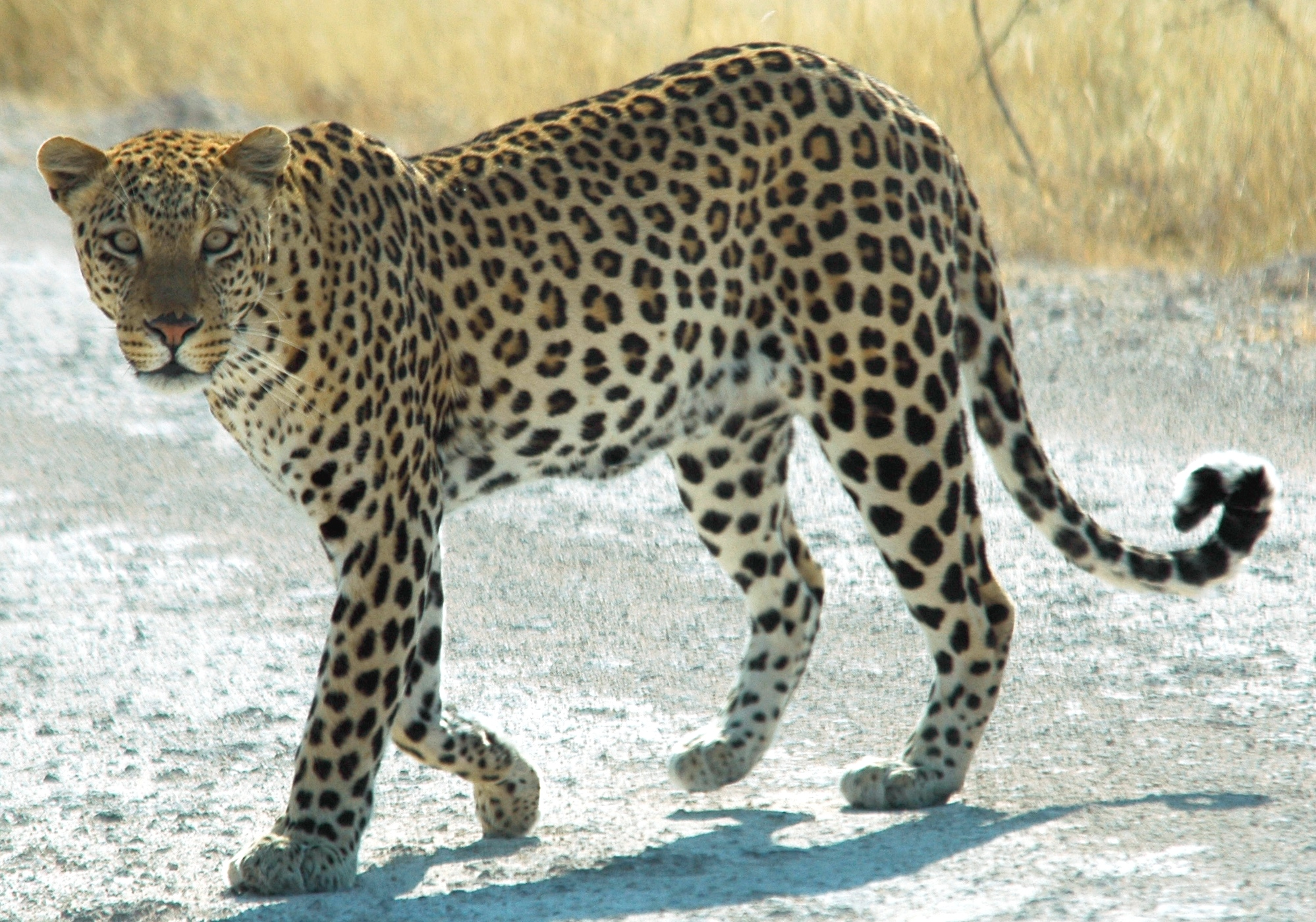
African leopard

]

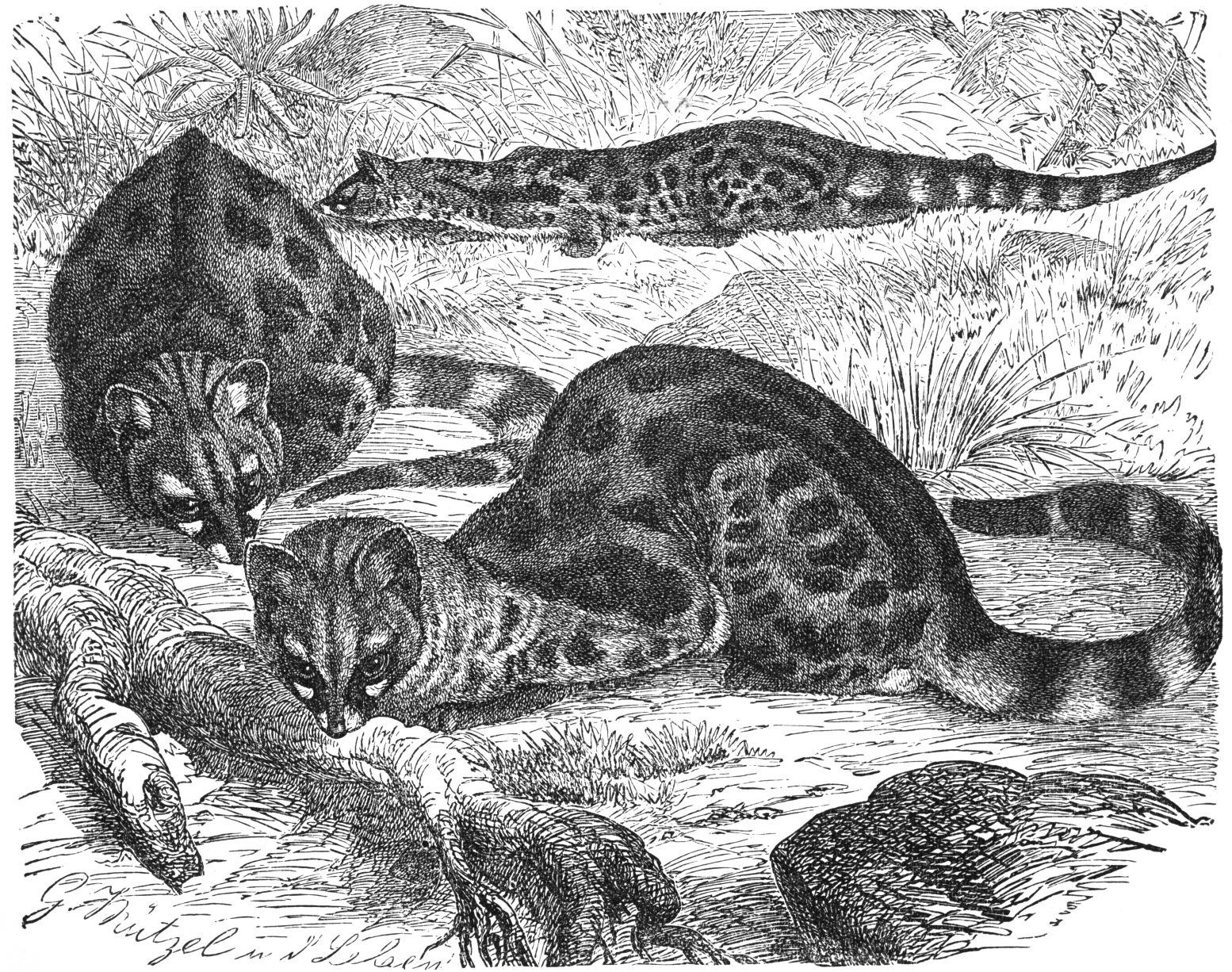
Common genet

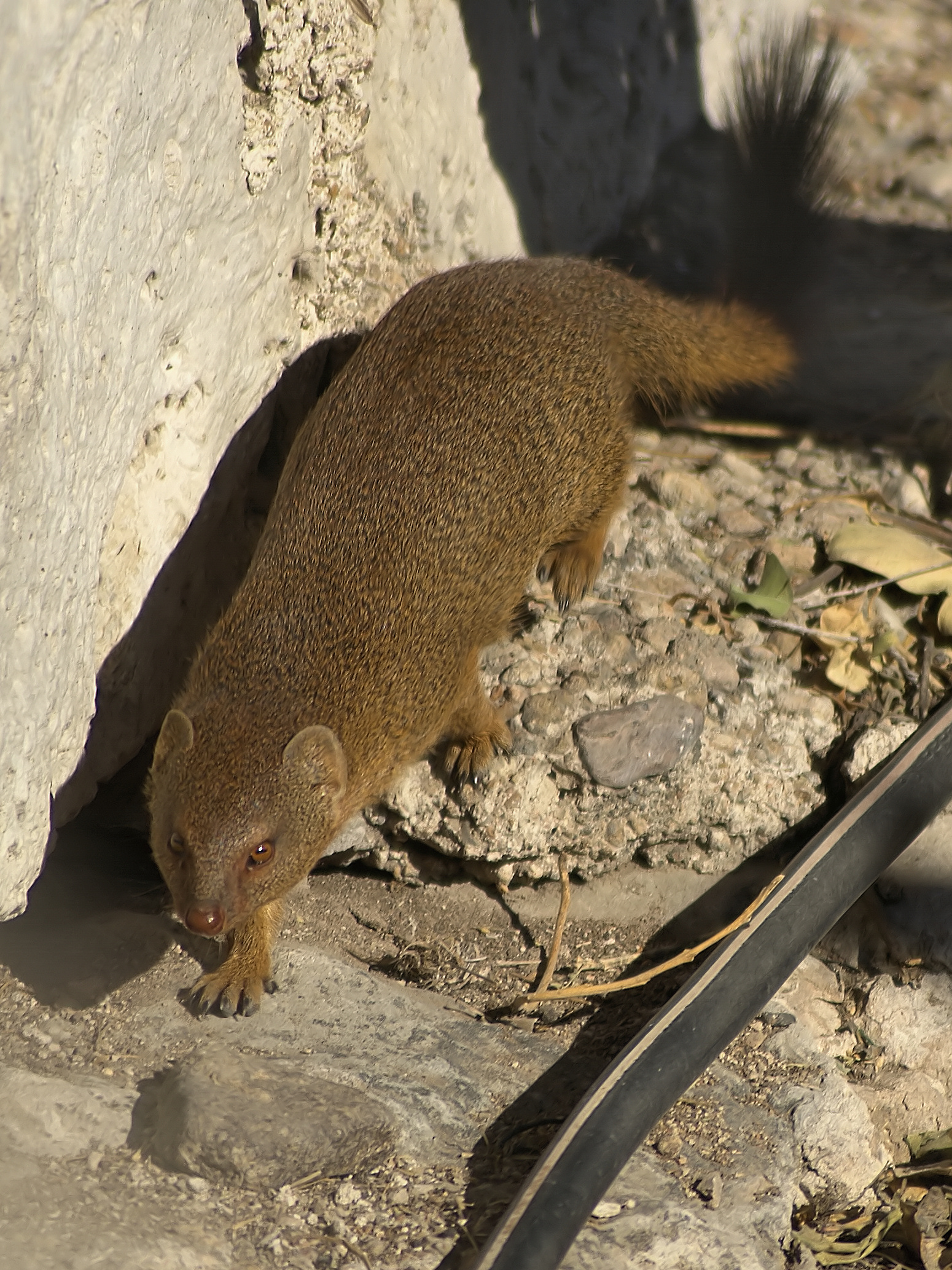
Angolan slender mongoose

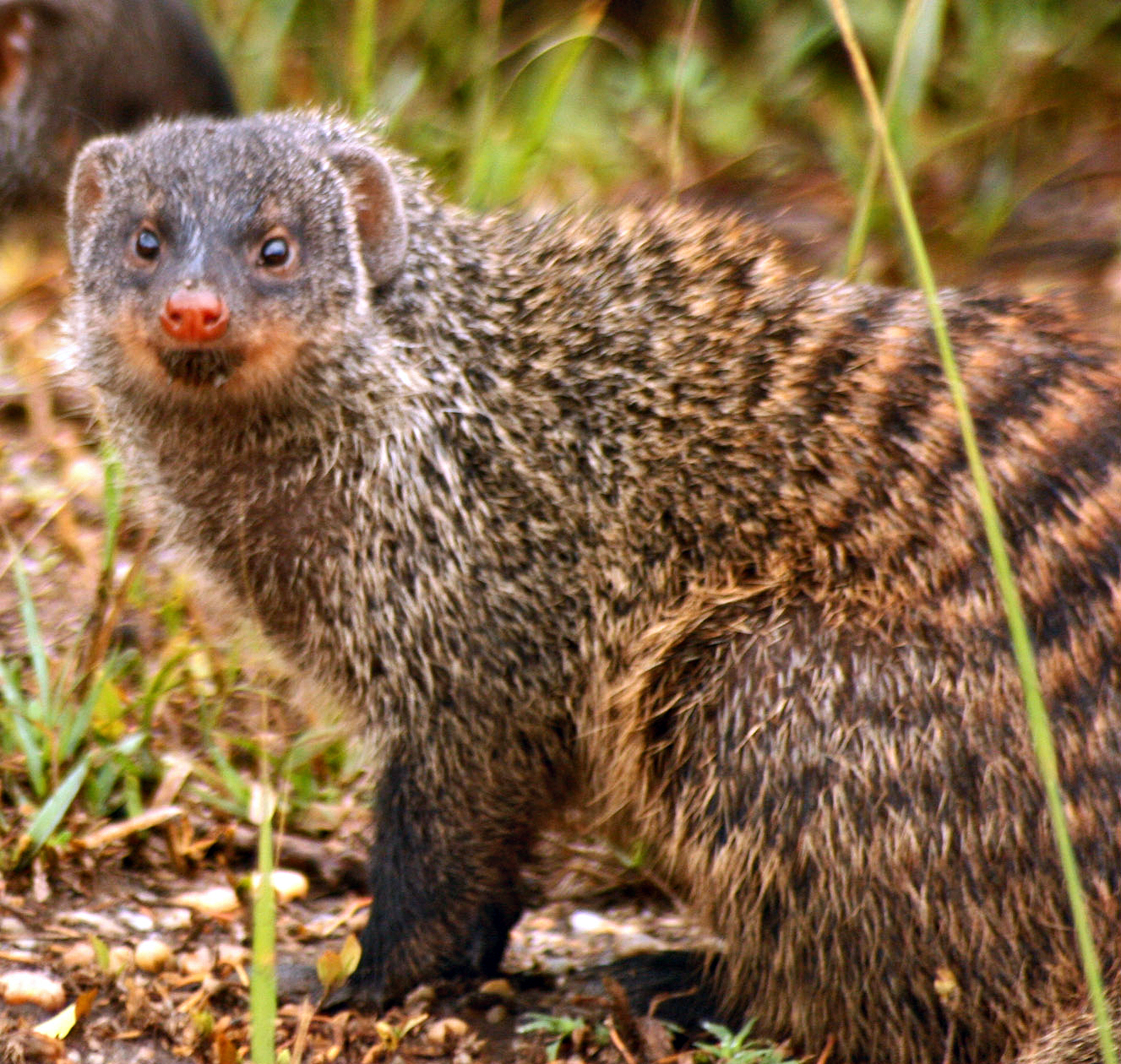
Banded mongoose

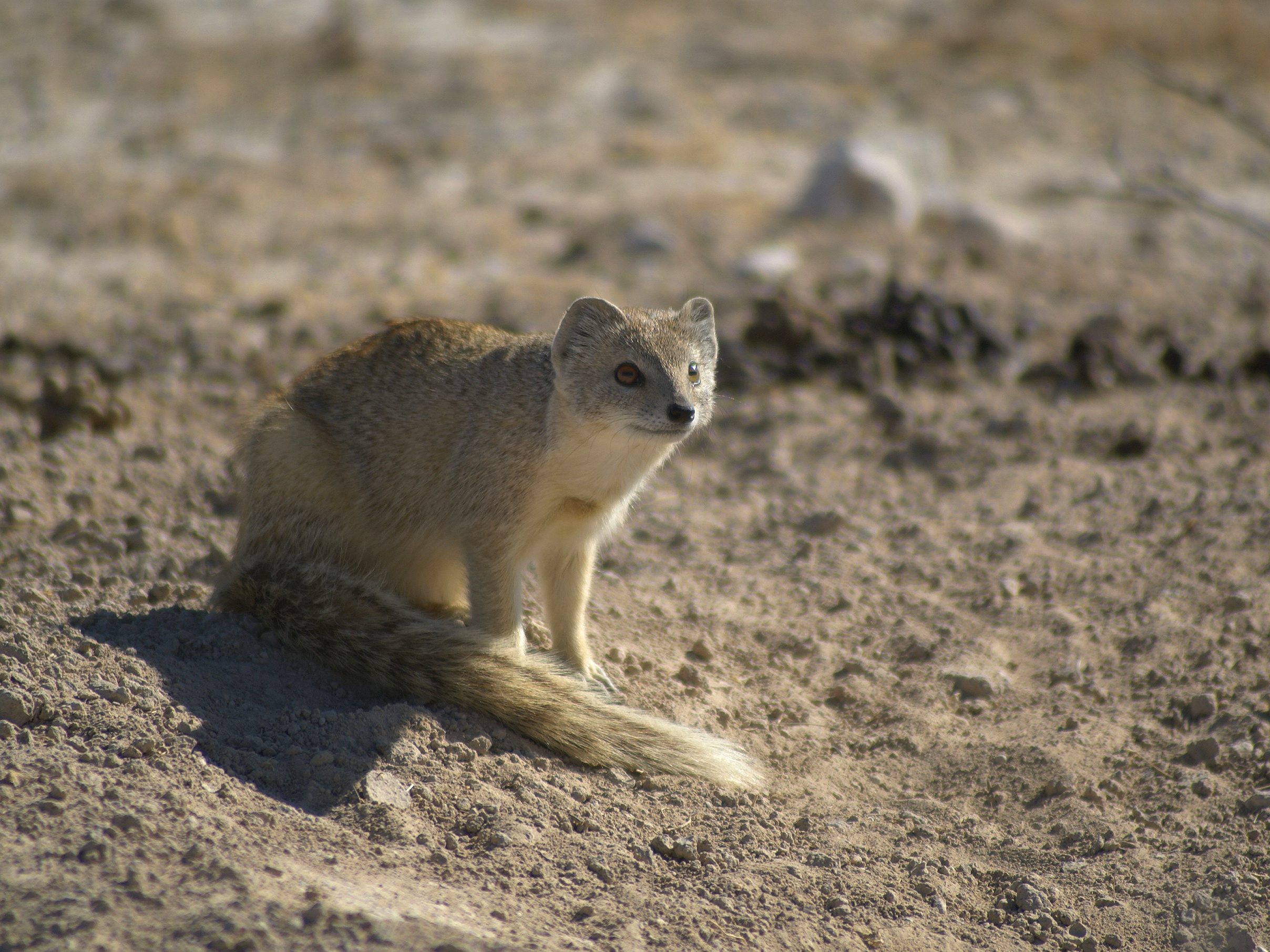
Yellow mongoose

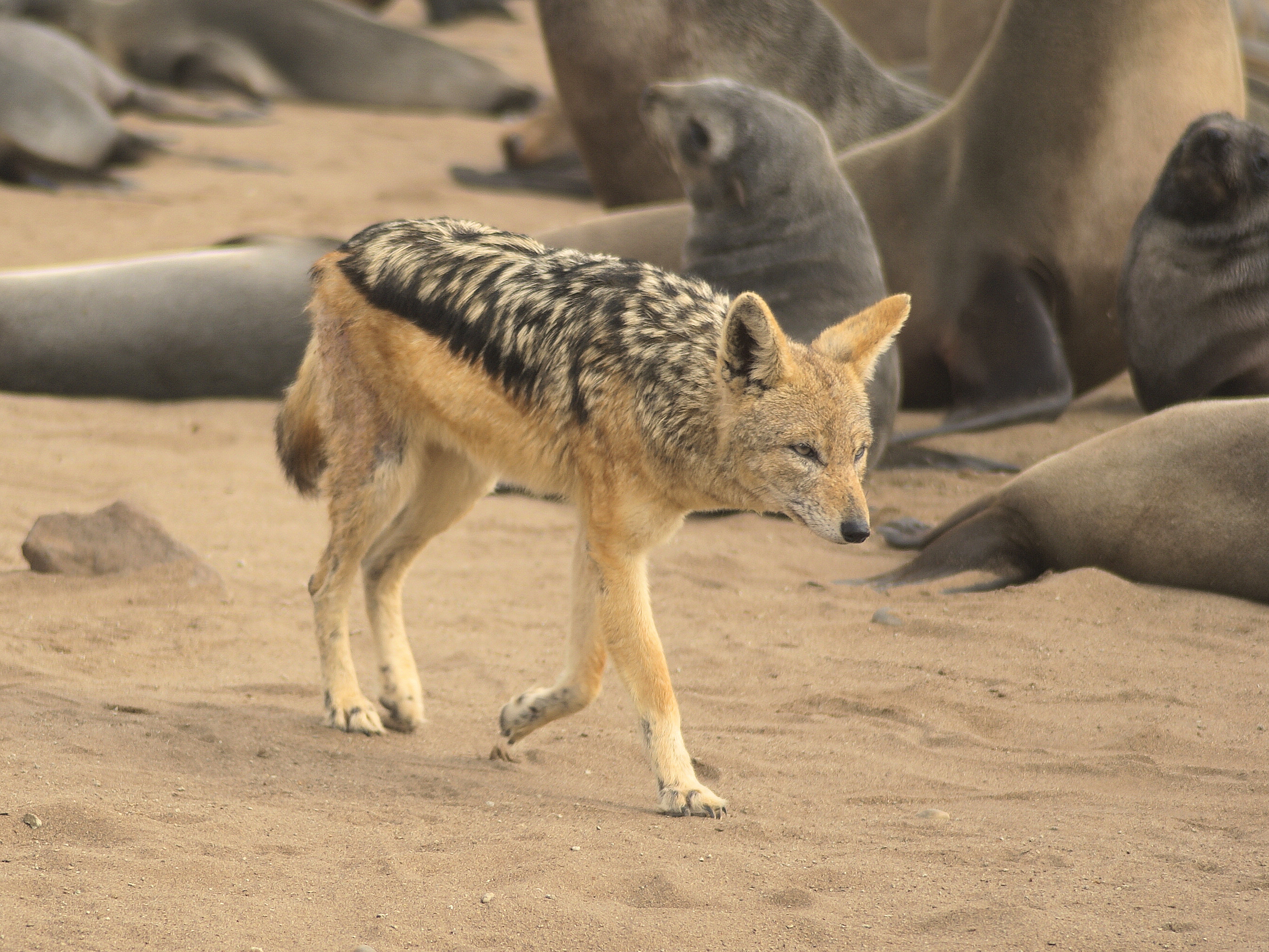
Black-backed jackal

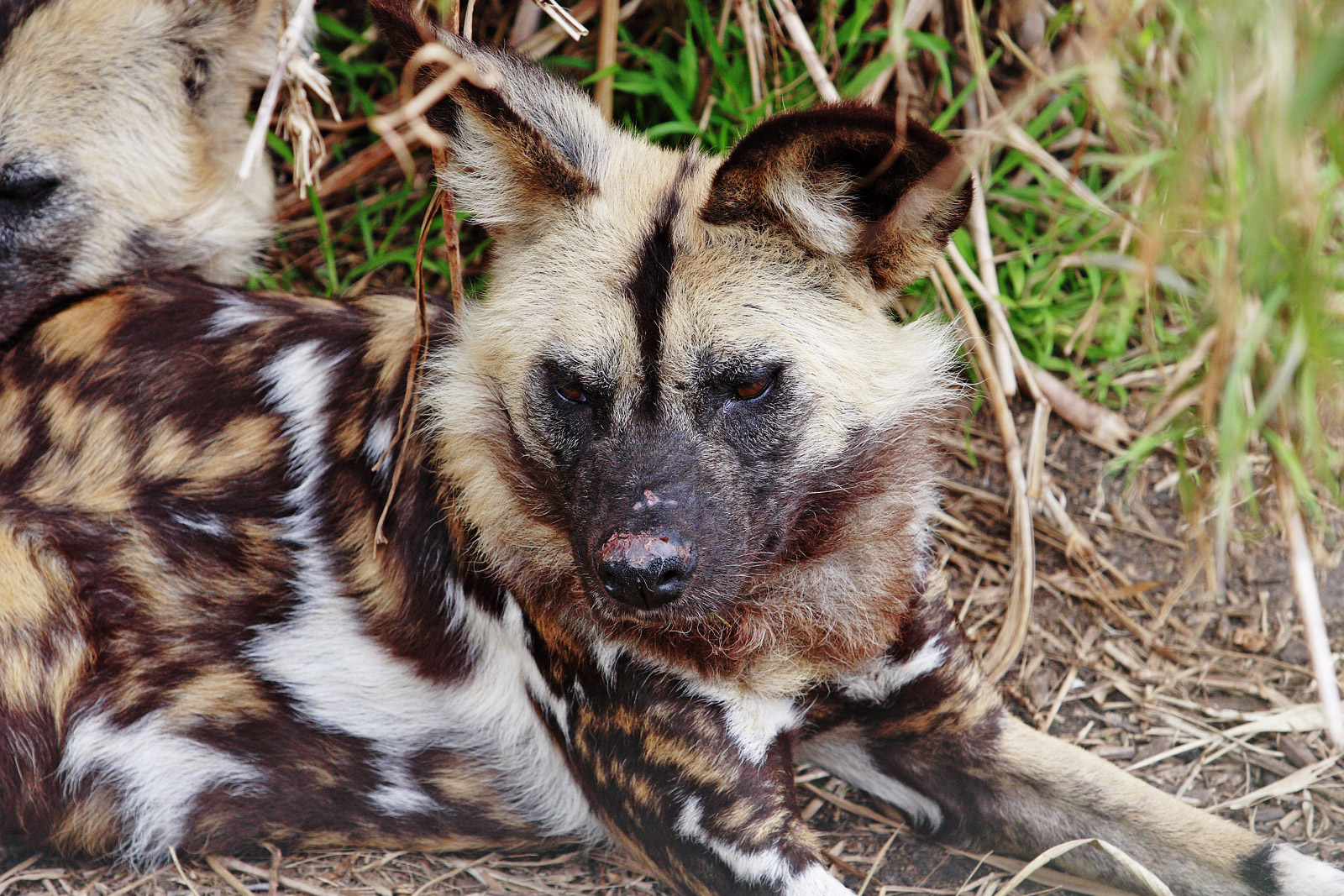
African wild dog

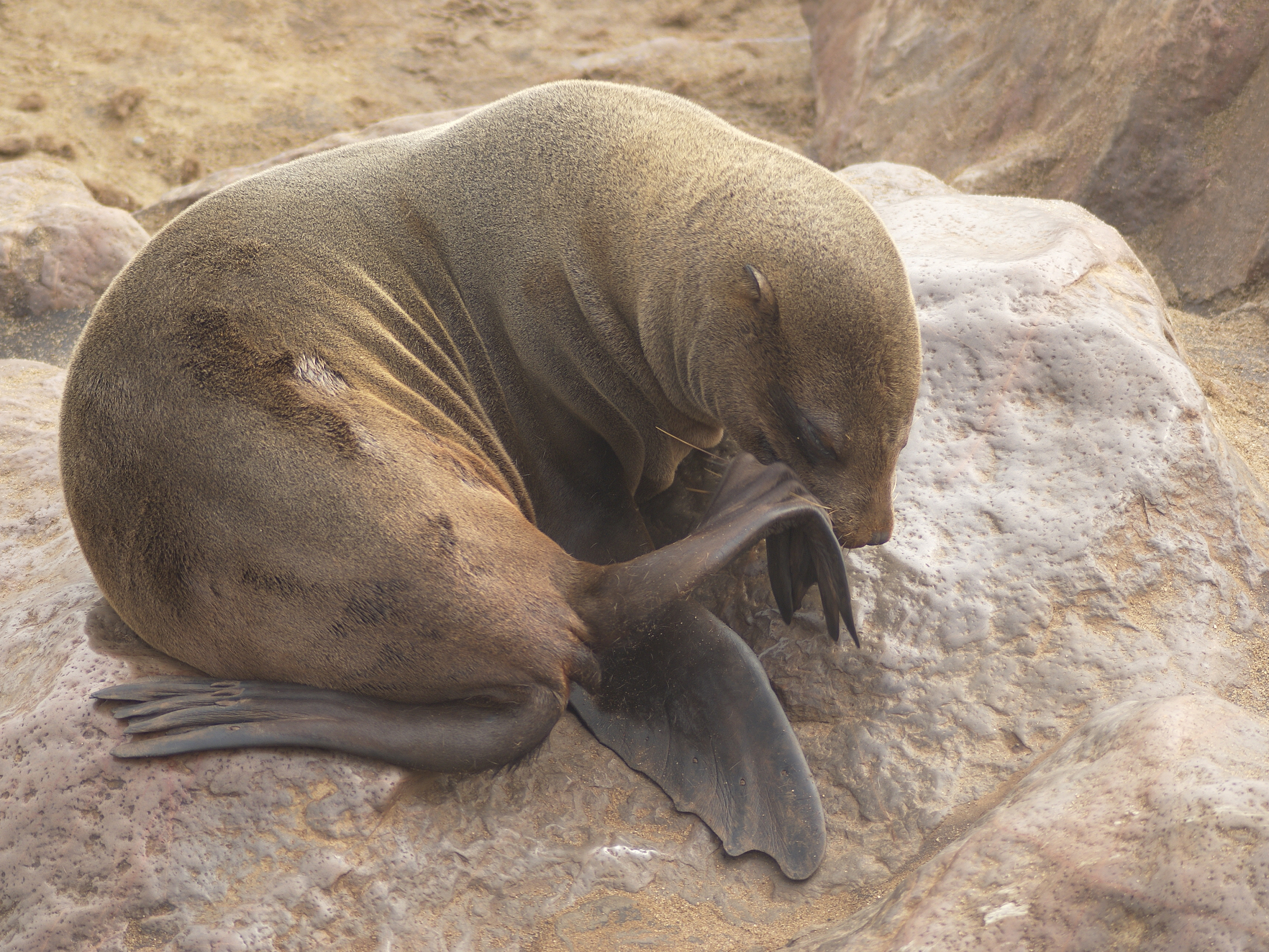
Cape fur seal

There are over 260 species of carnivorans, the majority of which feed primarily on meat. They have a characteristic skull shape and dentition.

- Suborder: Feliformia
  - Family: Felidae (cats)
    - Subfamily: Felinae
      - Genus: Acinonyx
        - Cheetah, A. jubatus VU
          - Southeast African cheetah, A. j. jubatus
      - Genus: Caracal
        - Caracal, C. caracal LC
      - Genus: Felis
        - Black-footed cat, F. nigripes VU
        - African wildcat, F. lybica LC
      - Genus: Leptailurus
        - Serval, L. serval LC
    - Subfamily: Pantherinae
      - Genus: Panthera
        - Lion, P. leo VU
          - P. l. melanochaita
        - Leopard, P. pardus NT
          - African leopard, P. p. pardus
  - Family: Viverridae
    - Subfamily: Viverrinae
      - Genus: Civettictis
        - African civet, C. civetta LC
      - Genus: Genetta
        - Common genet, G. genetta LC
        - Rusty-spotted genet, G. maculata LC
  - Family: Herpestidae (mongooses)
    - Genus: Cynictis
      - Yellow mongoose, C. penicillata LC
    - Genus: Helogale
      - Common dwarf mongoose, H. parvula LC
    - Genus: Herpestes
      - Angolan slender mongoose, H. flavescens LC
      - Cape gray mongoose, H. pulverulentus LC
      - Common slender mongoose, H. sanguineus LC
    - Genus: Ichneumia
      - White-tailed mongoose, I. albicauda LC
    - Genus: Mungos
      - Banded mongoose, M. mungo LC
    - Genus: Paracynictis
      - Selous' mongoose, P. selousi LC
    - Genus: Suricata
      - Meerkat, S. suricatta LC
  - Family: Hyaenidae (hyaenas)
    - Genus: Crocuta
      - Spotted hyena, C. crocuta LC
    - Genus: Parahyaena
      - Brown hyena, P. brunnea NT
    - Genus: Proteles
      - Aardwolf, P. cristatus LC
- Suborder: Caniformia
  - Family: Canidae (dogs, foxes)
    - Genus: Vulpes
      - Cape fox, V. chama LC
    - Genus: Lupulella
      - Side-striped jackal, L. adusta LC
      - Black-backed jackal, L. mesomelas LC
    - Genus: Otocyon
      - Bat-eared fox, O. megalotis LC
    - Genus: Lycaon
      - African wild dog, L. pictus EN
  - Family: Mustelidae (mustelids)
    - Genus: Ictonyx
      - Striped polecat, I. striatus LC
    - Genus: Poecilogale
      - African striped weasel, P. albinucha LC
    - Genus: Mellivora
      - Honey badger, M. capensis LC
    - Genus: Lutra
      - Speckle-throated otter, L. maculicollis LC
    - Genus: Aonyx
      - African clawless otter, A. capensis LC
  - Family: Otariidae (eared seals, sealions)
    - Genus: Arctocephalus
      - Cape fur seal, A. pusillus LC
  - Family: Phocidae (earless seals)
    - Genus: Mirounga
      - Southern elephant seal, M. leonina LC

== Order: Perissodactyla (odd-toed ungulates) ==
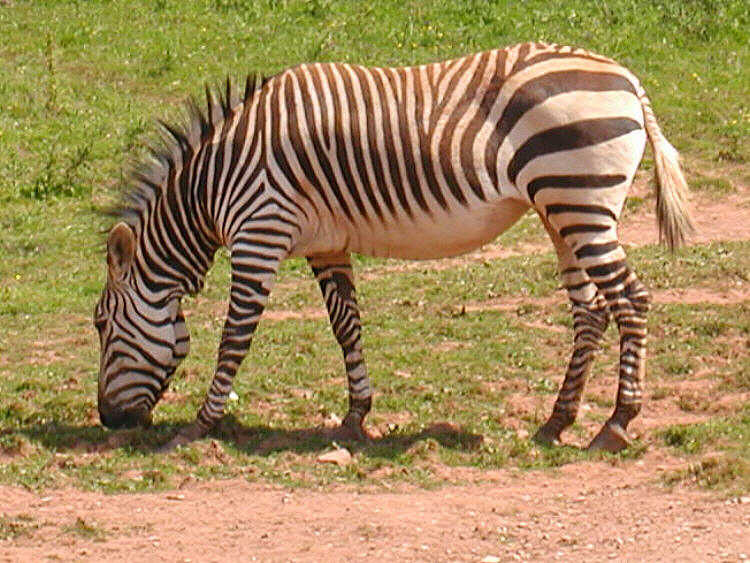
Hartmann's mountain zebra

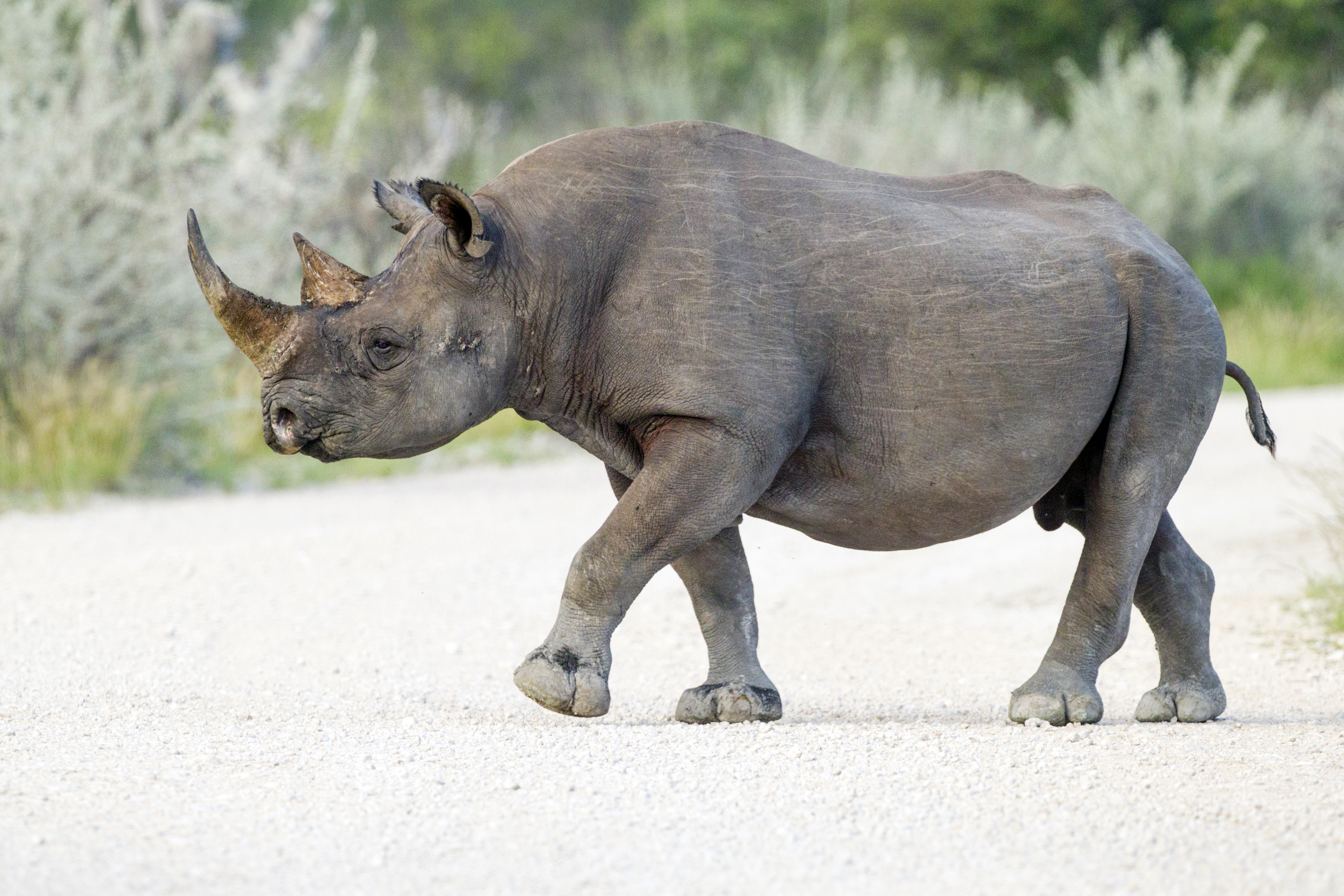
South-western black rhinoceros

The odd-toed ungulates are browsing and grazing mammals. They are usually large to very large, and have relatively simple stomachs and a large middle toe.

- Family: Equidae (horses etc.)
  - Genus: Equus
    - Plains zebra, E. quagga NT
      - Burchell's zebra, E. q. burchellii
      - Chapman's zebra, E. q. chapmani
    - Mountain zebra, E. zebra VU
      - Hartmann's mountain zebra, E. z. hartmannae
- Family: Rhinocerotidae
  - Genus: Ceratotherium
    - White rhinoceros, C. simum
      - Southern white rhinoceros, C. s. simum NT
  - Genus: Diceros
    - Black rhinoceros, D. bicornis
      - Chobe black rhinoceros, D. b. chobiensis
      - Southern black rhinoceros, D. b. bicornis EX
      - South-western black rhinoceros, D. b. occidentalis NT

== Order: Artiodactyla (even-toed ungulates) ==
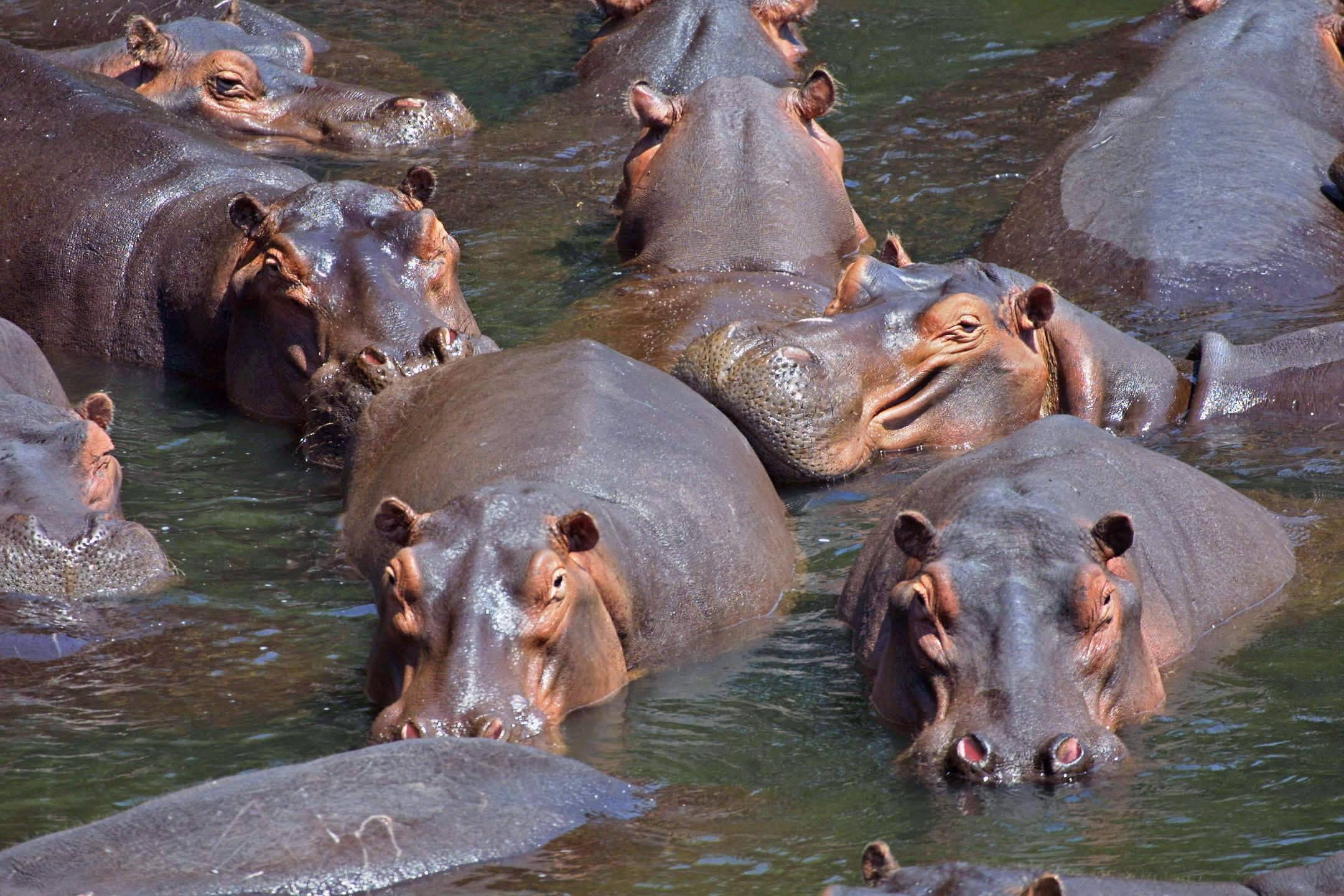
Hippopotamus

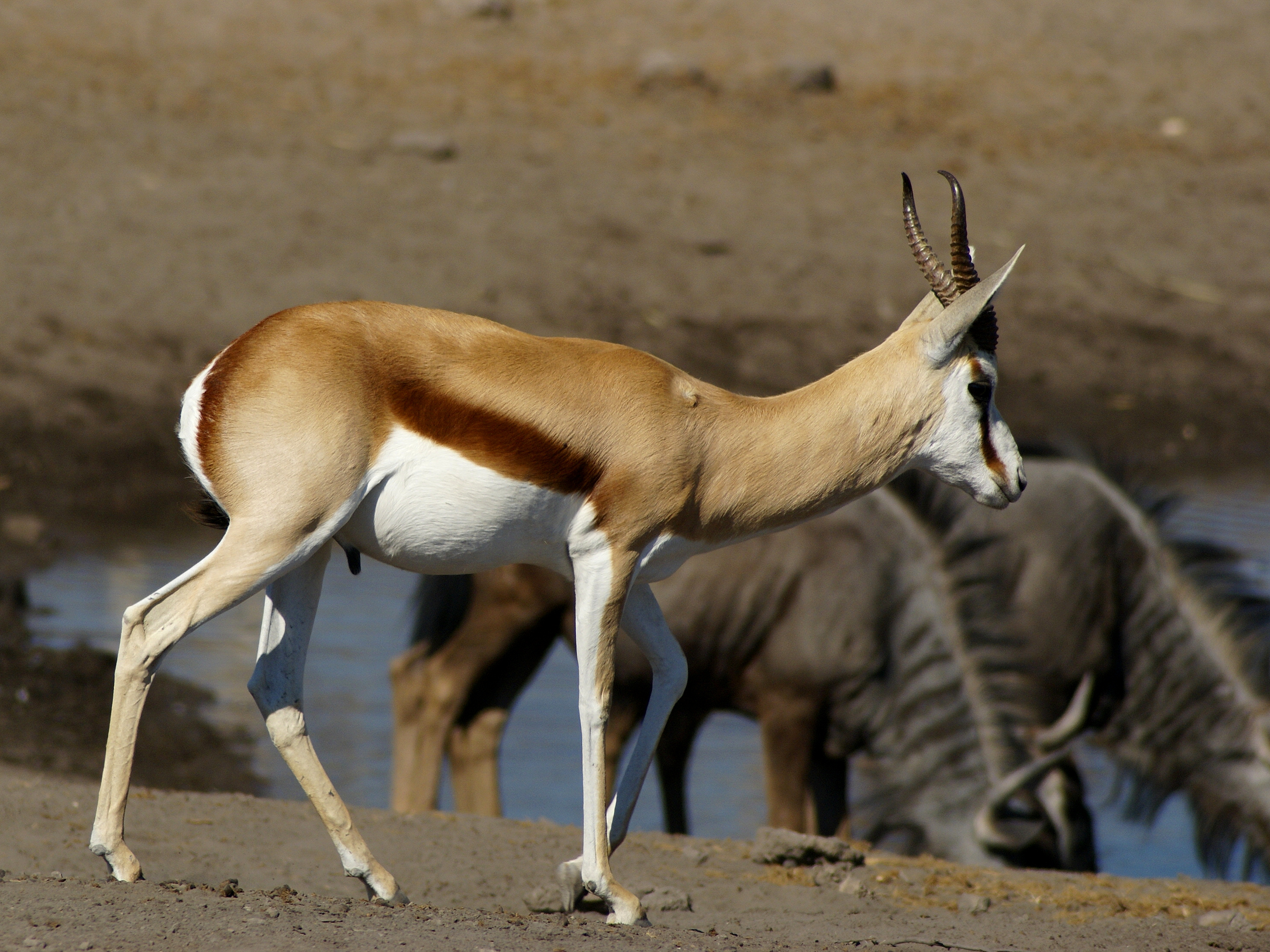
Springbok antelope

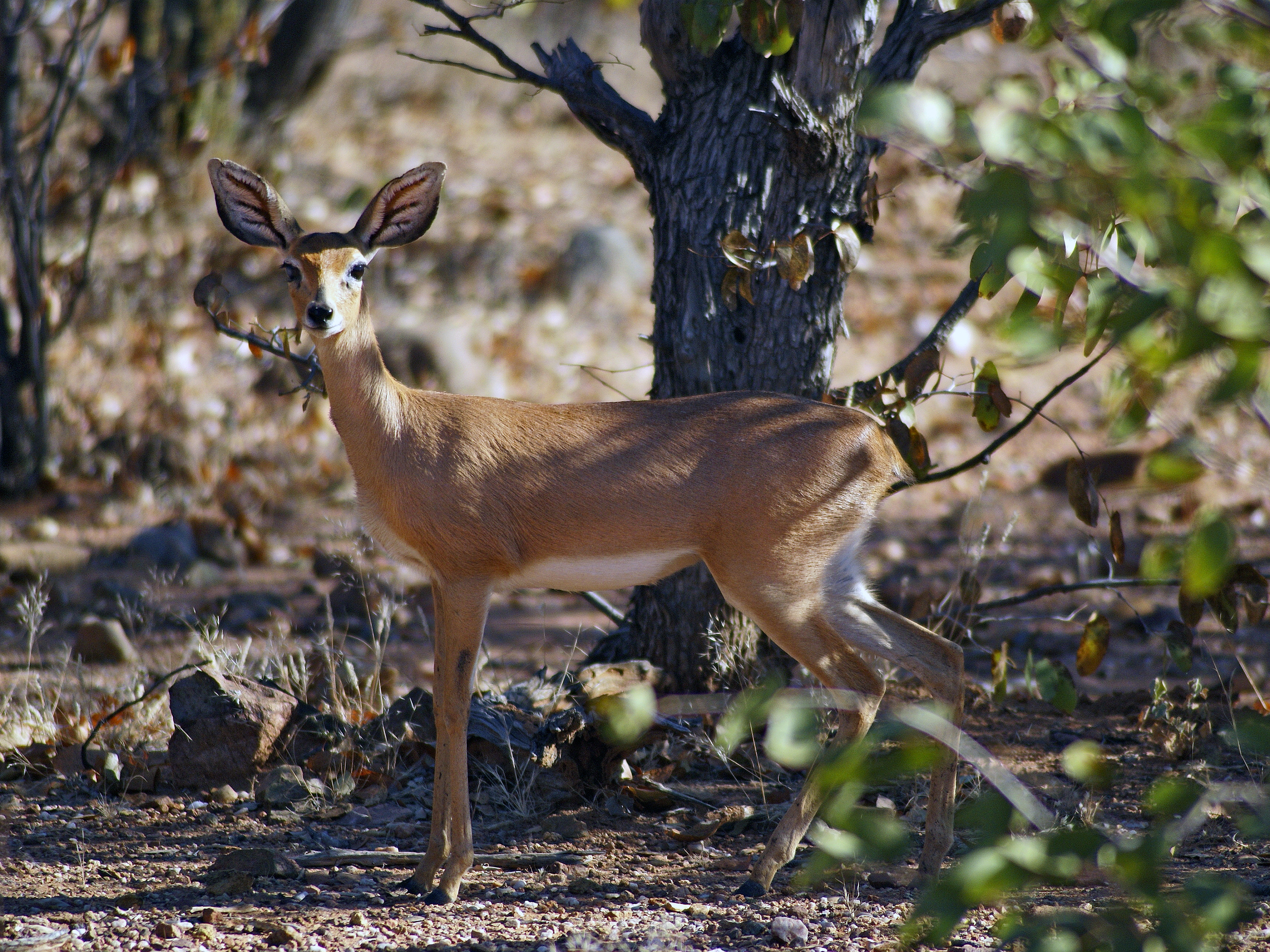
Steenbok

]

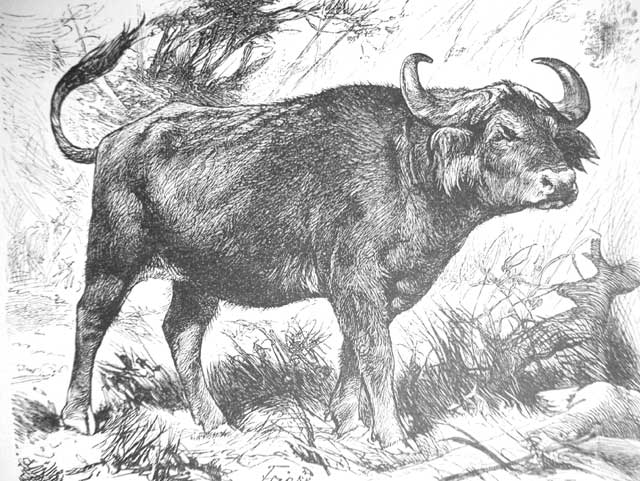
African buffalo

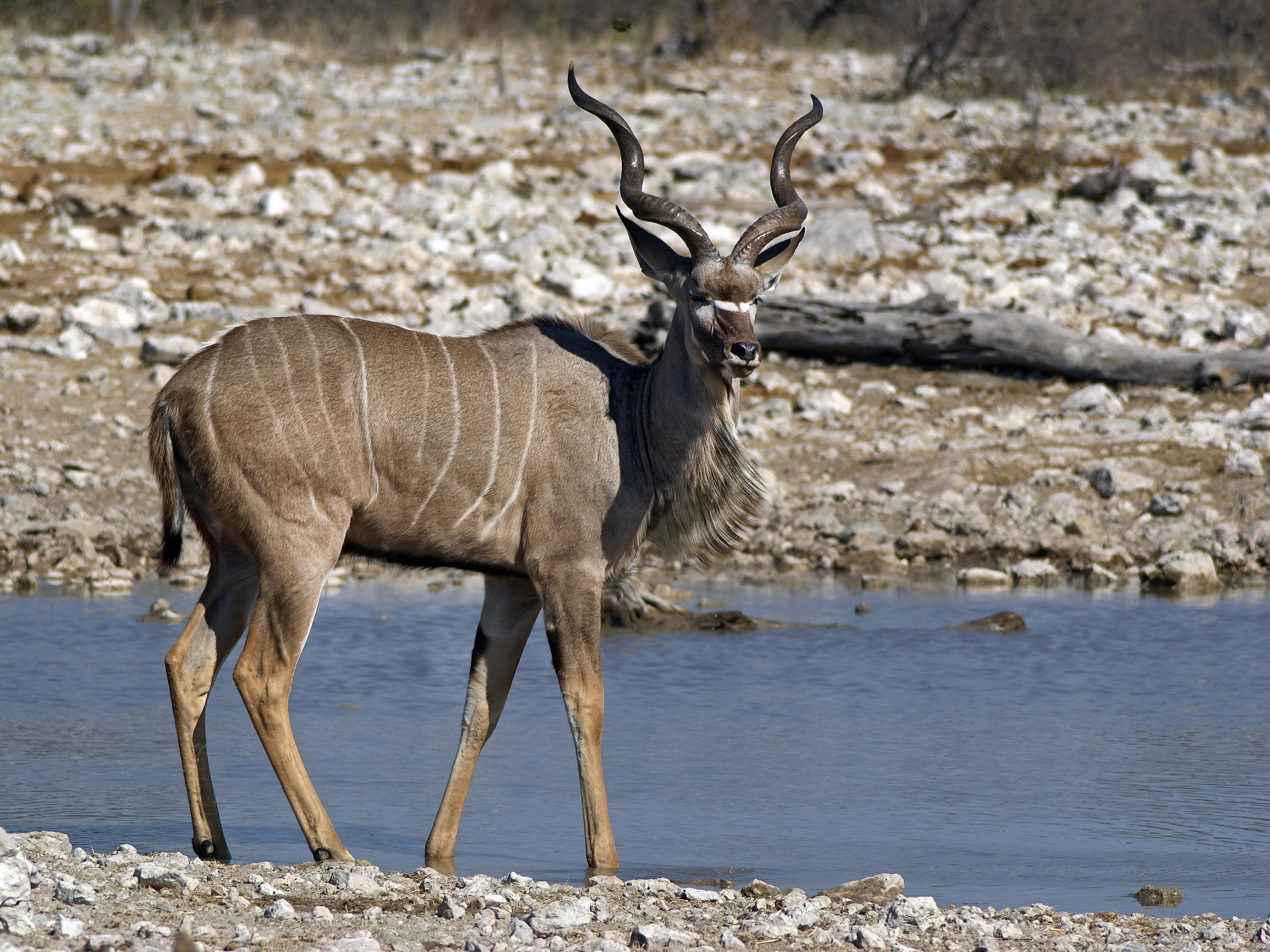
Greater kudu

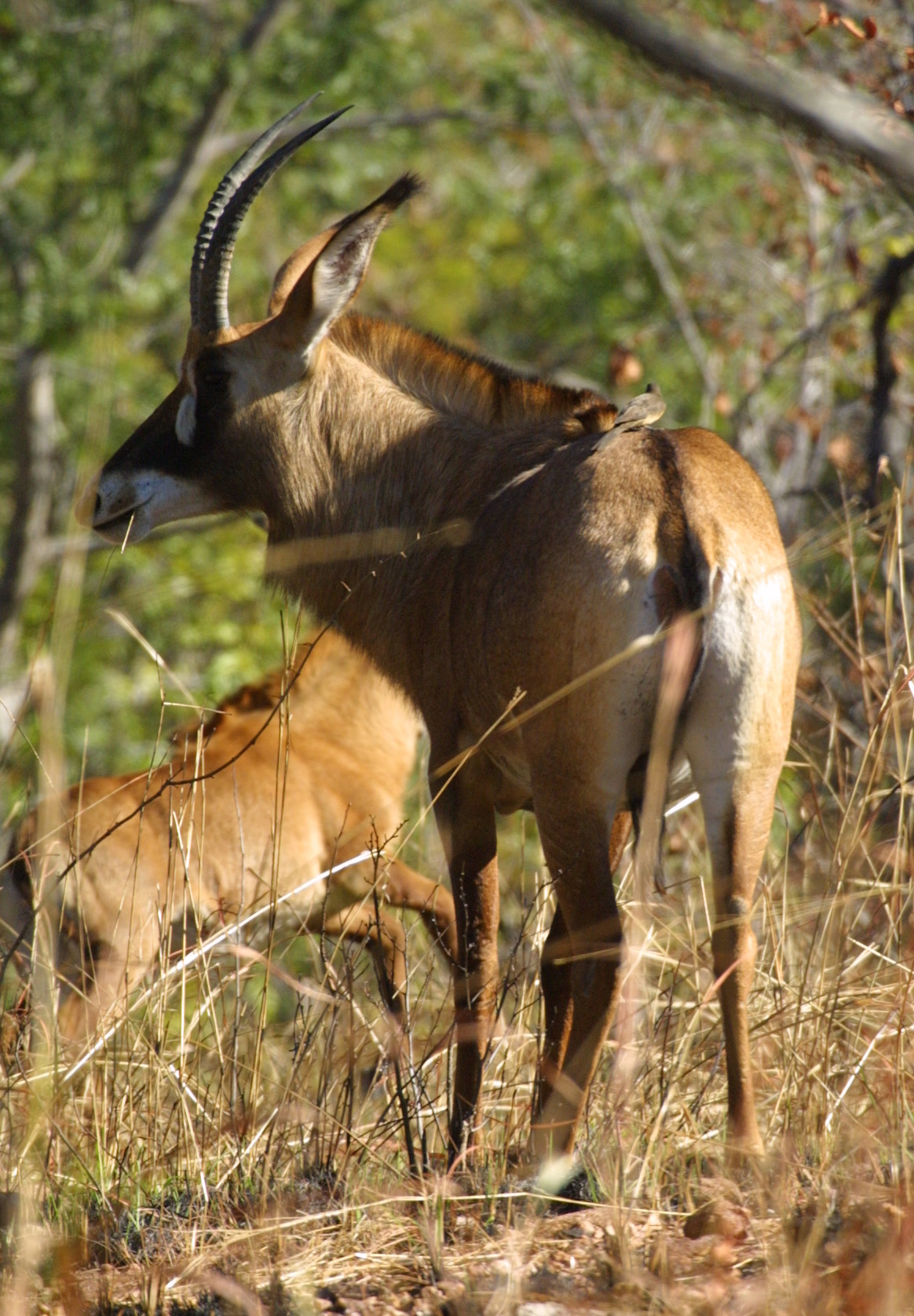
Roan antelope

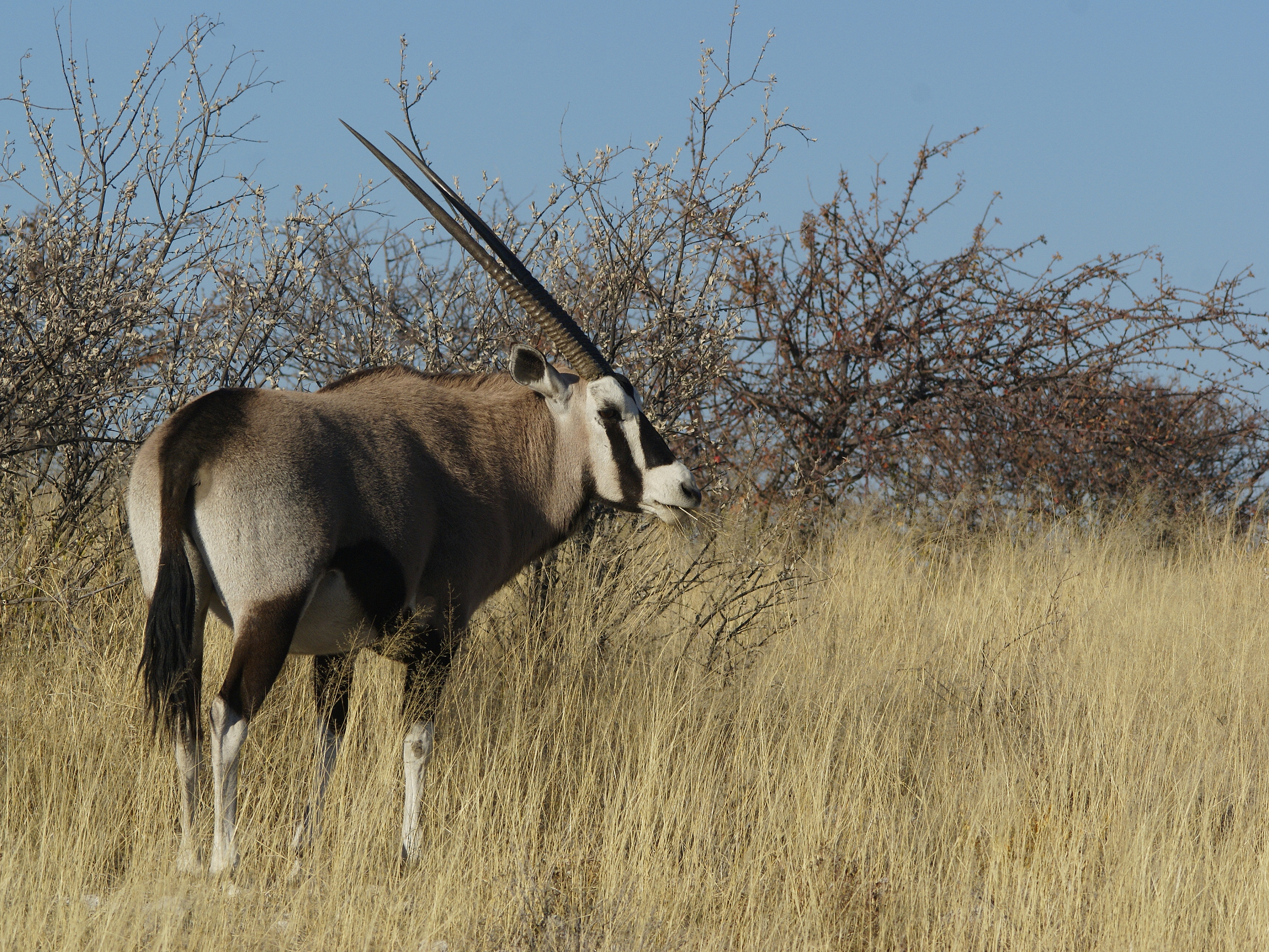
Gemsbok

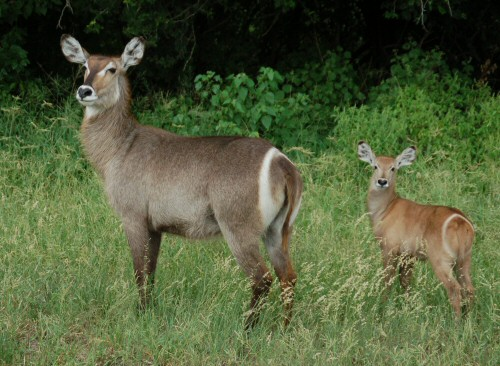
Waterbuck

The even-toed ungulates are ungulates whose weight is borne about equally by the third and fourth toes, rather than mostly or entirely by the third as in perissodactyls. There are about 220 artiodactyl species, including many that are of great economic importance to humans.

- Family: Suidae (pigs)
  - Subfamily: Phacochoerinae
    - Genus: Phacochoerus
      - Common warthog, Phacochoerus africanus LR/lc
  - Subfamily: Suinae
    - Genus: Potamochoerus
      - Bushpig, Potamochoerus larvatus LR/lc
- Family: Hippopotamidae (hippopotamuses)
  - Genus: Hippopotamus
    - Hippopotamus, Hippopotamus amphibius VU
- Family: Giraffidae (giraffe, okapi)
  - Genus: Giraffa
    - Giraffe, Giraffa camelopardalis VU
- Family: Bovidae (cattle, antelope, sheep, goats)
  - Subfamily: Alcelaphinae
    - Genus: Alcelaphus
      - Hartebeest, Alcelaphus buselaphus LR/cd
    - Genus: Connochaetes
      - Blue wildebeest, Connochaetes taurinus LR/cd
    - Genus: Damaliscus
      - Topi, Damaliscus lunatus LR/cd
  - Subfamily: Antilopinae
    - Genus: Antidorcas
      - Springbok antelope, Antidorcas marsupialis LR/cd
    - Genus: Madoqua
      - Kirk's dik-dik, Madoqua kirkii LR/lc
    - Genus: Oreotragus
      - Klipspringer, Oreotragus oreotragus LR/cd
    - Genus: Raphicerus
      - Steenbok, Raphicerus campestris LR/lc
  - Subfamily: Bovinae
    - Genus: Syncerus
      - African buffalo, Syncerus caffer LR/cd
    - Genus: Tragelaphus
      - Nyala, T. angasii LC introduced
      - Common eland, Tragelaphus oryx LR/cd
      - Bushbuck, Tragelaphus scriptus LR/lc
      - Sitatunga, Tragelaphus spekii LR/nt
      - Greater kudu, Tragelaphus strepsiceros LR/cd
  - Subfamily: Cephalophinae
    - Genus: Sylvicapra
      - Common duiker, Sylvicapra grimmia LR/lc
  - Subfamily: Hippotraginae
    - Genus: Hippotragus
      - Roan antelope, Hippotragus equinus LR/cd
      - Sable antelope, Hippotragus niger LR/cd
    - Genus: Oryx
      - Gemsbok, Oryx gazella LR/cd
  - Subfamily: Aepycerotinae
    - Genus: Aepyceros
      - Impala, Aepyceros melampus LR/cd
  - Subfamily: Reduncinae
    - Genus: Kobus
      - Waterbuck, Kobus ellipsiprymnus LR/cd
      - Lechwe, Kobus leche LR/cd
      - Puku, Kobus vardonii LR/cd
    - Genus: Redunca
      - Southern reedbuck, Redunca arundinum LR/cd

== See also ==
- Wildlife of Namibia
- List of chordate orders
- Lists of mammals by region
- List of prehistoric mammals
- Mammal classification
- List of mammals described in the 2000s
