= Littledale =

Littledale may refer to:

== People ==
- Littledale (surname)

== Places ==
- Caton-with-Littledale, a civil parish in Lancashire, including the village of Littledale
- Littledale Hall, a former country house in Lancashire

== See also ==
- Littledale's whistling rat, a species of rat
