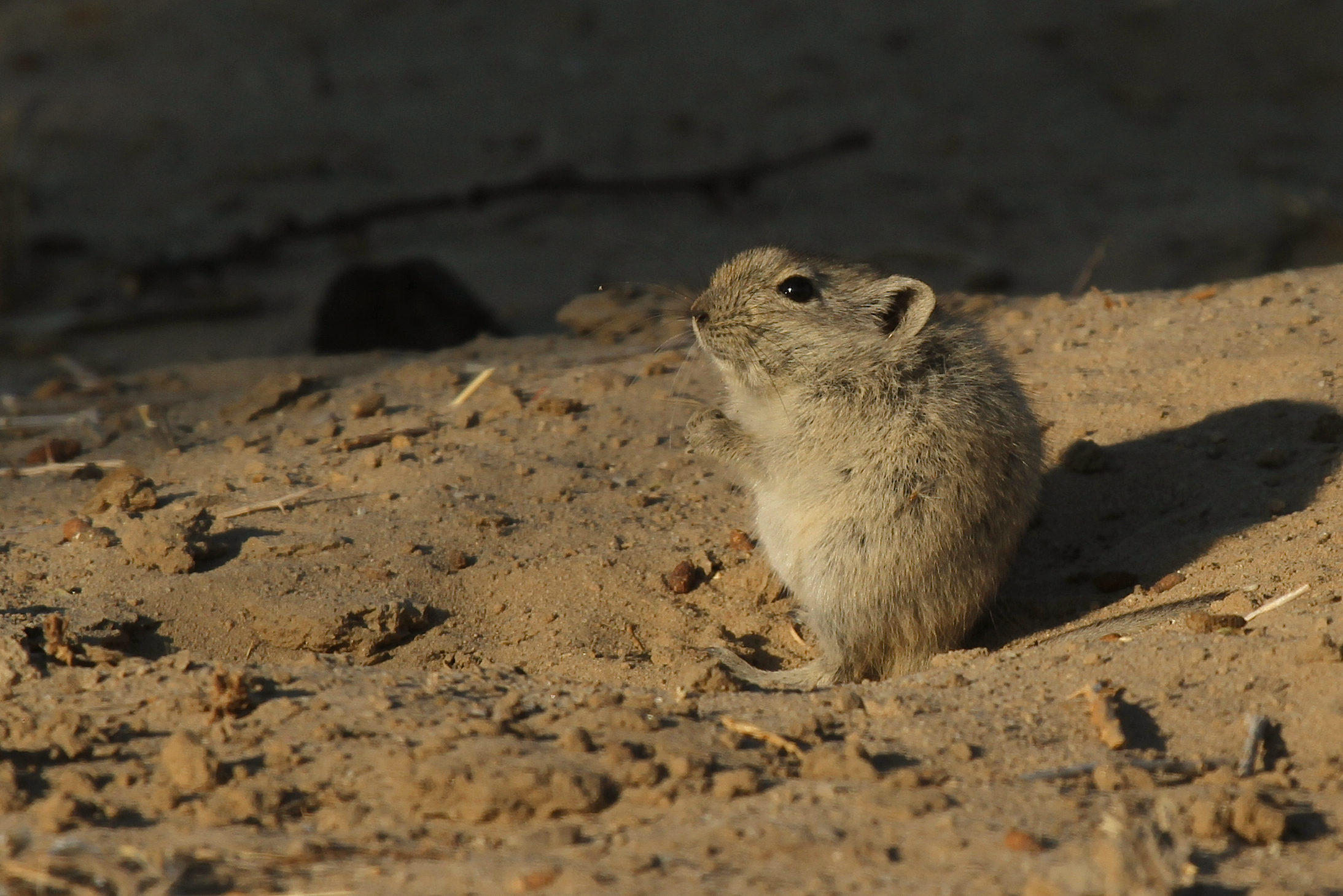
- Brants's whistling rat (Parotomys brantsii)

Scientific classification
- Domain: Eukaryota
- Kingdom: Animalia
- Phylum: Chordata
- Class: Mammalia
- Order: Rodentia
- Family: Muridae
- Tribe: Otomyini
- Genus: Parotomys; Thomas, 1918

Type species
- Euryotis brantsii

Species
- Parotomys brantsii Parotomys littledalei

= Parotomys =

Parotomys Temporal range: Middle Pleistocene - Recent

Genus of rodents

Parotomys is a small genus of rodent in the family Muridae. Member species are found in the African countries of Botswana, Namibia, and South Africa. It contains the following two species:

- Brants's whistling rat (Parotomys brantsii)
- Littledale's whistling rat (Parotomys littledalei)
