= Dune hairy-footed gerbil =

Conservation status
- Least Concern (IUCN 3.1)

Scientific classification
- Kingdom: Animalia
- Phylum: Chordata
- Class: Mammalia
- Order: Rodentia
- Family: Muridae
- Genus: Gerbillurus
- Species: G. tytonis

Binomial name
- Gerbillurus tytonis (Bauer & Niethammer, 1960)

Species of mammal

The dune hairy-footed gerbil, or the Namib dune gerbil (Gerbillurus tytonis) is a species of rodent found only in Namibia. Its natural habitat is temperate desert where it lives in loose sand among sand dunes, feeding opportunistically on arthropods, seeds and green vegetation.

== Description ==
The dune hairy-footed gerbil is a moderate-sized Gerbillurus species with a head-and-body length of 99 mm (3.9 in) and a long tail. The head is narrow with a pointed muzzle, large eyes, and long, sparsely-haired ears. The upper parts of the head and body are a rich chestnut, sharply delineated from the underparts, which are white. There is a small white patch above each eye. The legs are white, the forelegs being much shorter than the hind legs. There are five toes on each foot, with the toes of the hind feet being long and flared. All the feet have well-furred soles and a distinctive fringe of hairs on each toe. The tail is very long, being chestnut above and white below, and tipped with a tuft of greyish hairs.

== Distribution and habitat ==
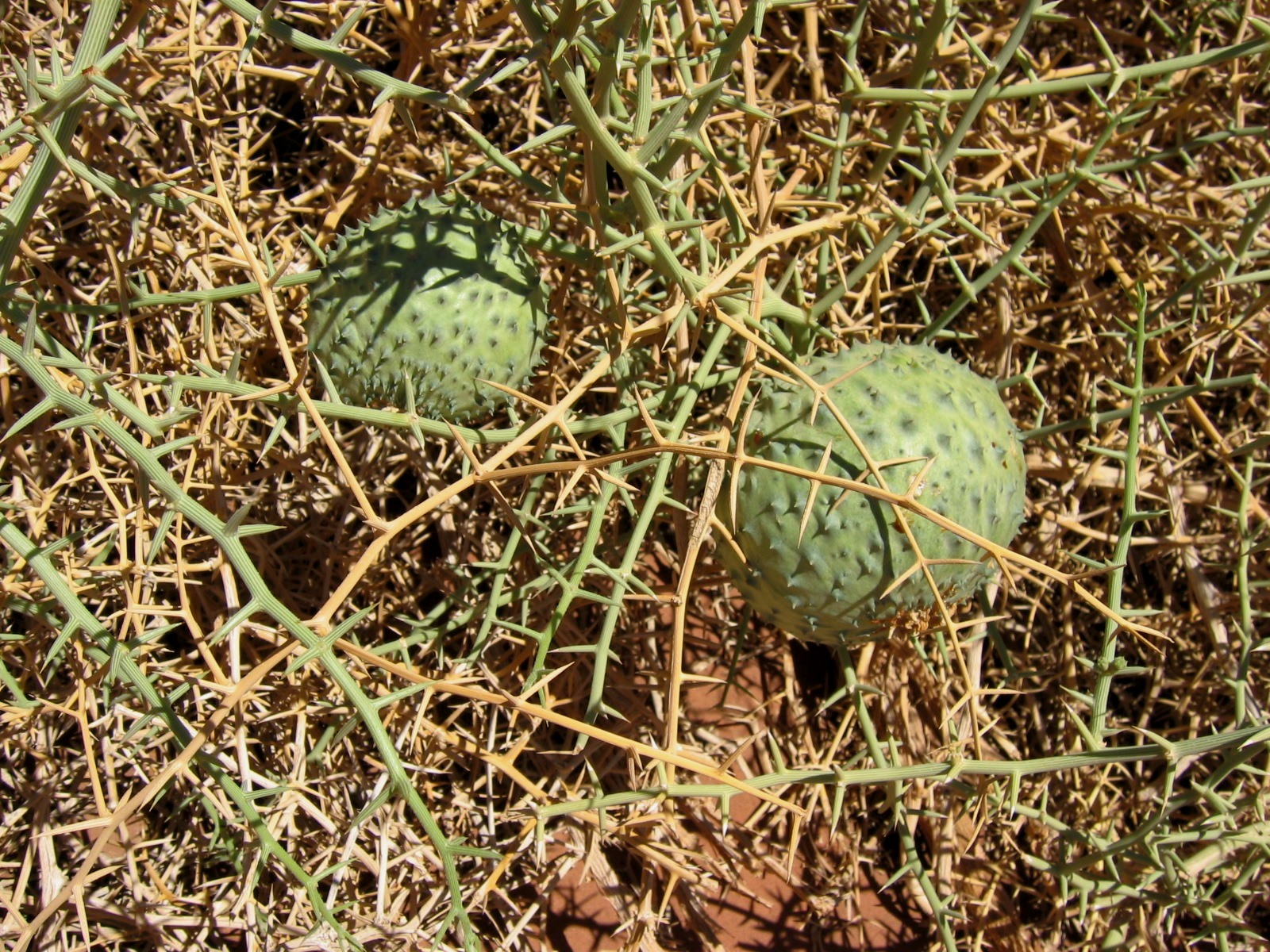
Dune hairy-footed gerbil burrows are often concealed under Acanthosicyos horridus plants

This gerbil is endemic to the deserts of western Namibia, where it occurs in areas with high or low sand dunes, and in dune hummocks. Its range consists of an area near the coast between Swakopmund and Lüderitz. It favours habitats with shifting sand and some plant life, avoiding hard compact dune valley floors. The burrow is often dug beside Trianthema hereroensis or Stipagrostis sabulicola plants, whose roots stabilise the soil, or in the hummocks of spiny growth formed by Acanthosicyos horridus (nara) plants.

== Ecology ==
The dune hairy-footed gerbil is nocturnal and moves by leaping, being able to cover up to 41 cm (16 in) in a single jump. It keeps cool by day by remaining underground in its burrow. This may be branched, have more than one entrance, and be up to 1 m (40 in) long. Inside the burrow there are caches of food and a nest chamber filled with shredded plant matter. The gerbil's diet includes arthropods and seeds, and green vegetation when available. This gerbil concentrates its urine, and has no need to drink as long as its food is rich in arthropods and does not entirely consist of dry seeds. It maintains the condition of its coat by frequent sand-bathing.

== Status ==
This species is common in its dune habitat. It is presumed to have a large total population and no specific threats have been identified. It is present in some protected areas and the International Union for Conservation of Nature has assessed its conservation status as being of "least concern".
