= Namib brush-tailed gerbil =

Conservation status
- Least Concern (IUCN 3.1)

Scientific classification
- Kingdom: Animalia
- Phylum: Chordata
- Class: Mammalia
- Order: Rodentia
- Family: Muridae
- Genus: Gerbillurus
- Species: G. setzeri

Binomial name
- Gerbillurus setzeri (Schlitter, 1973)

Synonyms
- Gerbillus (Gerbillurus) setzeri Schlitter, 1973

Species of rodent

The Namib brush-tailed gerbil or Setzer's hairy-footed gerbil (Gerbillurus setzeri) is a species of rodent endemic to Angola and Namibia. Its natural habitats are sandy and gravelly plains. It stays in its burrow by day, emerging at night to feed on arthropods, vegetable matter, and seeds.

== Description ==
The Namib brush-tailed gerbil is the largest species in the genus Gerbillurus, growing to a head-and-body length of about 110 mm (4.3 in) with a tail of around 130 mm (5 in). The dorsal fur is a pale sandy brown colour, individual hairs having a grey basal half and a sandy tip. The flanks are paler than the back, and the face, chin, throat and underparts are white. The eyes are surrounded by indistinct whitish eye rings, the ears are colourless and scantily furred, and the whiskers are black and white. The legs and feet are white, with the soles and the undersides of the digits being densely clad with hair. The tail is sandy-coloured above and white beneath, and is tipped by a long tuft of grey hairs.

== Distribution and habitat ==
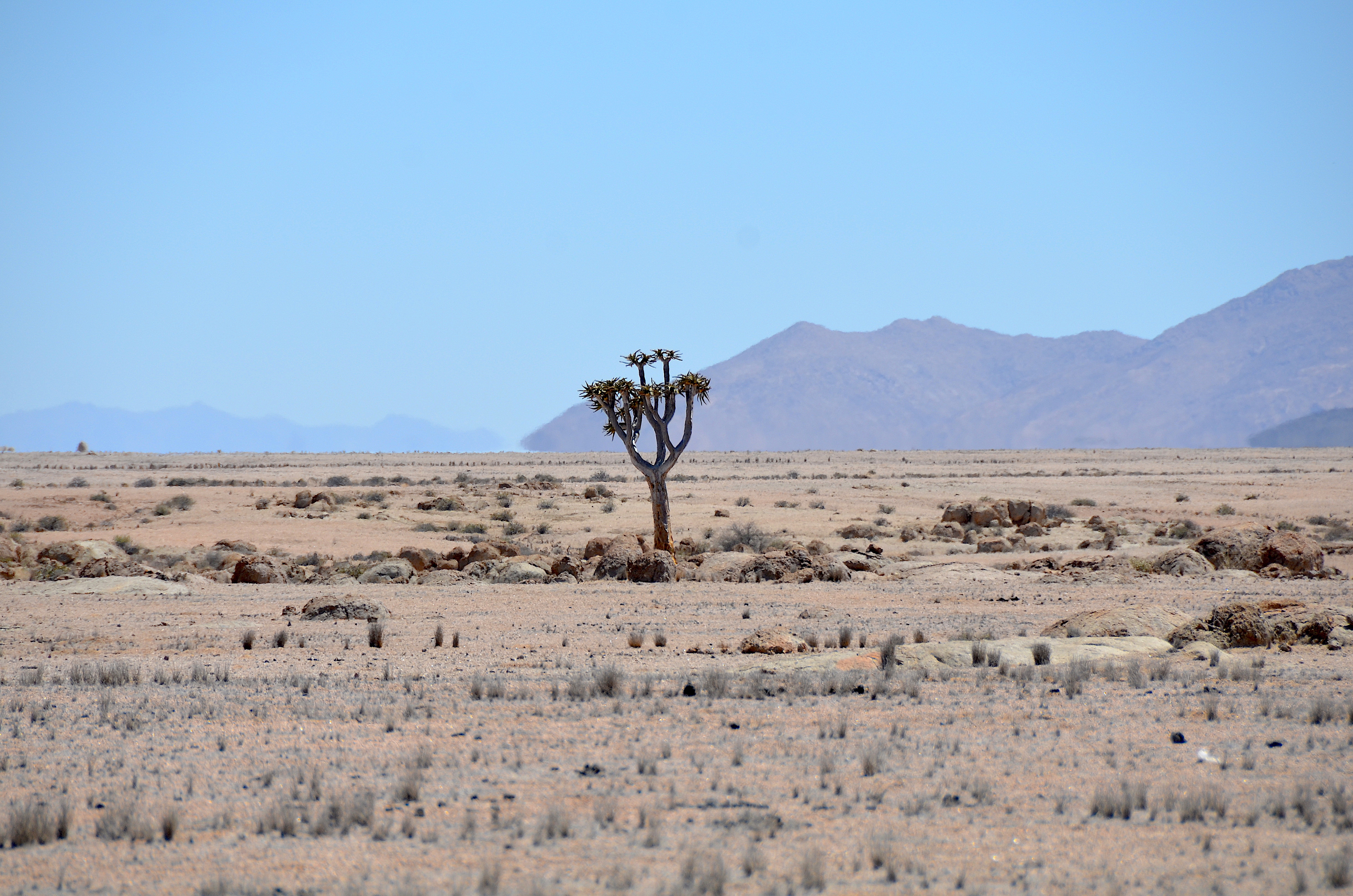
Suitable habitat at Namib-Naukluft National Park

This gerbil endemic to southwestern Angola and northwestern and western Namibia in a strip of land running parallel to the coast. It typically occurs in sandy and gravelly areas, sand flats, bare gravel plains with thin, semi-compacted soils, and dried up riverbeds. When population densities rise, some animals may move into nearby dune areas.

== Ecology ==
The Namib brush-tailed gerbil is nocturnal, spending the day in a branching burrow with several entrances that it excavates. It prefers bare areas with little vegetation, and the position of its burrows is often made obvious by the heaps of excavated spoil of a different colour from the surroundings. The burrow may be as long as 2 m (7 ft) and contains a nesting chamber, lined with shredded herbage, and storerooms for food. The gerbil feeds on arthropods, plant material and seeds. It does not need to drink, as it is very efficient at concentrating its urine and is thus able to retain as much moisture in its body as possible. It is more sociable than some related species, but aggressive encounters sometimes occur, with chasing and boxing taking place; there are some vocalizations, including ultrasonic whistles, which are associated with sexual behaviour and communication, and foot drumming is also used.

== Status ==
This gerbil is a common species with a moderate-sized range and is presumed to have a large total population. Much of that population is found in protected areas, and the gerbil faces no particular threats, so the International Union for Conservation of Nature has assessed its conservation status as being of "least concern".
