= Littledale's whistling rat =

Conservation status
- Least Concern (IUCN 3.1)

Scientific classification
- Domain: Eukaryota
- Kingdom: Animalia
- Phylum: Chordata
- Class: Mammalia
- Order: Rodentia
- Family: Muridae
- Genus: Parotomys
- Species: P. littledalei

Binomial name
- Parotomys littledalei Thomas, 1918

Species of rodent

Littledale's whistling rat (Parotomys littledalei) is one of two species of murid rodent in the genus Parotomys, the other being Brants's whistling rat (Parotomys brantsii). It is found in Namibia and South Africa. Its natural habitats are temperate shrubland, subtropical or tropical dry shrubland, and temperate desert.

== Description ==
Littledale's whistling rat is very similar in morphology to Brants's whistling rat, but can be distinguished by the structure of the incisor teeth and by the pitch and length of the whistle-like call it emits. Males have a head-and-body length of about 215 mm (8.5 in) while females are a little smaller. The ears of Littledale's whistling rat are rather more pointed than those of Brants's whistling rat.

== Distribution and habitat ==
Littledale's whistling rat is found in some of southwestern Africa's driest area, the fringes of the Namib Desert and the Karoo region, with a total area of occupation of less than 2,000 km^{2} (770 sq mi). Its range includes southern Namibia and western South Africa, but does not extend into Angola. It has a rather patchy distribution and may not be able to disperse easily; when a prolonged drought occurred in the Goegap Nature Reserve in 2003, the rat became locally extinct, and the area took about a decade before it was recolonised. Its habitat is shrubland with soils of sufficient depth for its burrow systems, typically sand dunes, coastal hummocks, gravel flats and the dry floors of valleys.

== Ecology ==
Littledale's whistling rat is active during the day and feeds on grasses, succulents and other fresh plant material from which it obtains its water. It constructs extensive burrows under bushes, with several chambers containing shredded vegetation; these are linked by surface tracks which also lead to feeding areas. When it detects the presence of a predator, it emits a shrill whistle, and the rat's presence in an area can be evidenced by its vocalisations rather than visually.

== Status ==
Littledale's whistling rat has a wide range which includes several protected areas. In suitable habitat, it is a common species, and seems to be facing no particular threats, and the International Union for Conservation of Nature has assessed its conservation status as being of "least concern". The South African Regional Red List has assessed it as being near-threatened, citing its vulnerability to increased periods of drought, and to any changes of ground cover, such as increased grass or decreased shrubs, as a result of changes of grazing patterns.
