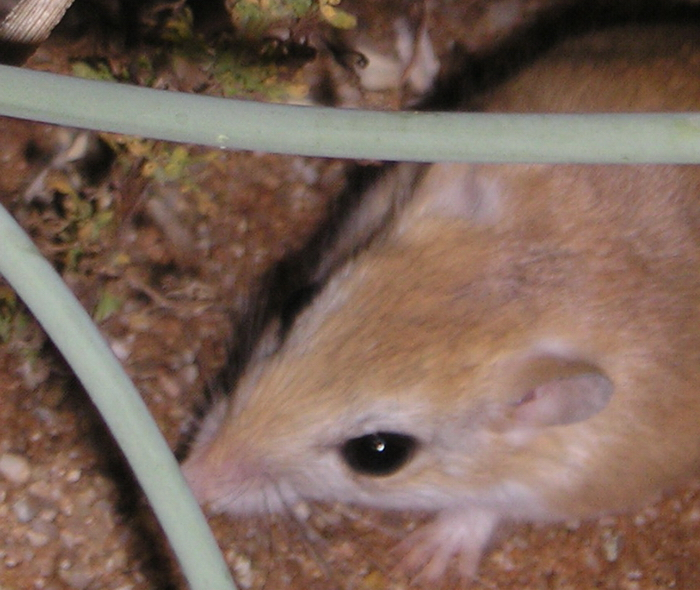

Conservation status
- Least Concern (IUCN 3.1)

Scientific classification
- Kingdom: Animalia
- Phylum: Chordata
- Class: Mammalia
- Order: Rodentia
- Family: Muridae
- Genus: Gerbillurus
- Species: G. paeba

Binomial name
- Gerbillurus paeba (A. Smith, 1836)

= Hairy-footed gerbil =

Species of mammal from Southern Africa

The hairy-footed gerbil (Gerbillurus paeba) is a species of rodent found in Angola, Botswana, Mozambique, Namibia, South Africa, and Zimbabwe. Its natural habitats are dry savanna, temperate shrubland, hot deserts, sandy shores, and urban areas. All members of this genus have hair on the soles of their feet, hence the name. They prefer sandy soil or sandy alluvium with grass, scrub or light woodland cover.

== Description ==
The hairy-footed gerbil weighs around 27 g (0.95 oz), smaller than other Gerbillurus species. They have a head-and-body length of around 9 cm (3.5 in), and a tail length of 11 cm (4.3 in). Distinctive to this genus are the soles of the feet, which have hair tufts on them, and hairs on each toe.

The coloring of the paeba is similar to other Gerbillurus members. However, coloring varies with precise locality and population. The upper parts of the body are reddish-orange to a greyish-red, whereas other Gerbillurus members may be a bit darker. The underparts are always white and the tail is the same color as the upper body parts.

== Habitat ==
The hairy-footed gerbil is a species of rodent found in southern Africa in Angola, Botswana, Mozambique, Namibia, South Africa, and Zimbabwe. Its natural habitats are dry savanna, temperate shrubland, hot deserts, sandy shores, and urban areas. It is a nocturnal species that lives in burrows with several entrances. It is also terrestrial, the entrances to its burrow hidden at the base of bushes and in clumps of grass. Gerbillus paebus feeds on the grass and bushes surrounding them, and they gnaw on the fallen and dried seed pods of thorn trees, and the seeds of the raisin bush. They also feed on insects.

== Behaviour ==
The hairy-footed gerbil engages in social grooming, where one gerbil lies down and another stands over it and grooms. Other normal grooming habits include scratching, face washing, licking and tail cleaning, and sand bathing.

== History ==
Gerbillurus paeba's name come from the French name for a small mouse, gerbille. The specific name, paeba comes from the local language Twsana name for mouse.
