= Bushy-tailed hairy-footed gerbil =

Conservation status
- Least Concern (IUCN 3.1)

Scientific classification
- Kingdom: Animalia
- Phylum: Chordata
- Class: Mammalia
- Order: Rodentia
- Family: Muridae
- Genus: Gerbillurus
- Species: G. vallinus

Binomial name
- Gerbillurus vallinus (Thomas, 1918)

Species of rodent

The bushy-tailed hairy-footed gerbil (Gerbillurus vallinus) is a species of rodent found in Namibia and South Africa. Its natural habitats are dry savanna, temperate grassland, and hot deserts. It is threatened by habitat loss.
