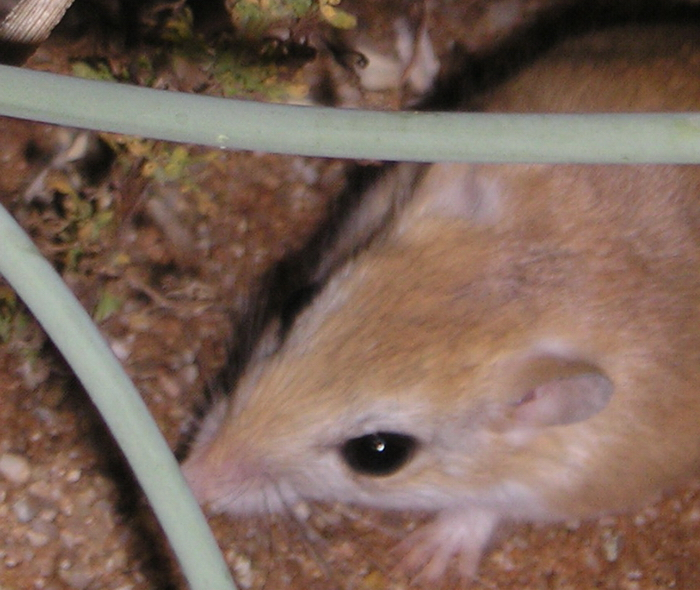
- Hairy-footed gerbil (Gerbillurus paeba)

Scientific classification
- Domain: Eukaryota
- Kingdom: Animalia
- Phylum: Chordata
- Class: Mammalia
- Order: Rodentia
- Family: Muridae
- Tribe: Gerbillurini
- Genus: Gerbillurus; Shortridge, 1942

Type species
- Gerbillus vallinus

Species
- Gerbillurus paeba Gerbillurus setzeri Gerbillurus tytonis Gerbillurus vallinus

= Gerbillurus =

Genus of rodents

Gerbillurus is a genus of rodent in the family Muridae. It contains the following species:

- Hairy-footed gerbil (Gerbillurus paeba)
- Namib brush-tailed gerbil (Gerbillurus setzeri)
- Dune hairy-footed gerbil (Gerbillurus tytonis)
- Bushy-tailed hairy-footed gerbil (Gerbillurus vallinus)
