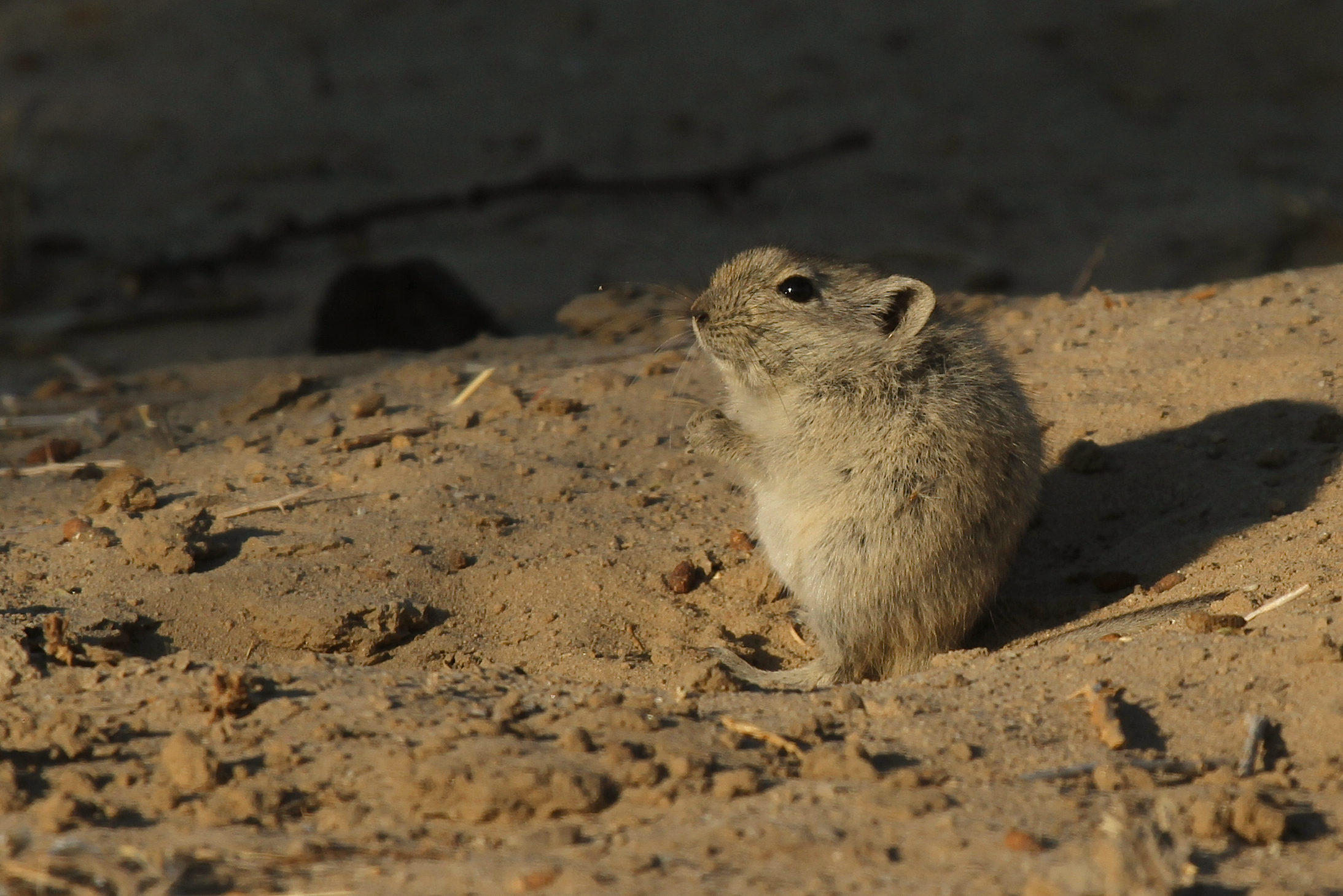
- In Kgalagadi Transfrontier Park

Conservation status
- Least Concern (IUCN 3.1)

Scientific classification
- Kingdom: Animalia
- Phylum: Chordata
- Class: Mammalia
- Order: Rodentia
- Family: Muridae
- Genus: Parotomys
- Species: P. brantsii

Binomial name
- Parotomys brantsii (A. Smith, 1834)
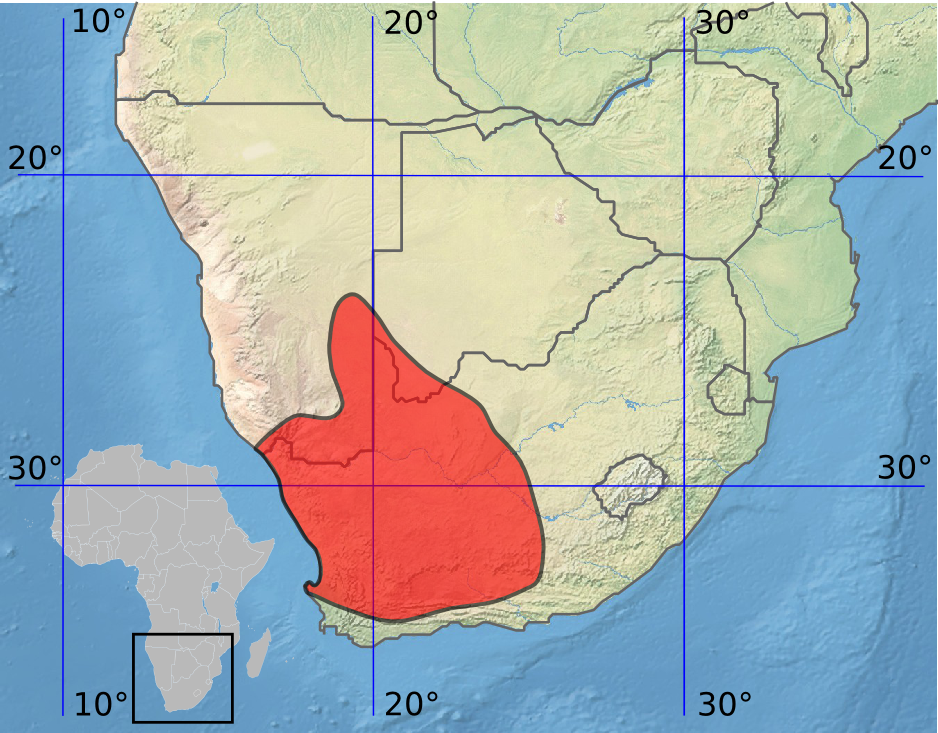
- Brants's whistling rat range

Synonyms
- Euryotis brantsii A. Smith, 1834; P. deserti Roberts, 1933; P. luteolus (Thomas and Schwann, 1904); P. pallida (Wagner, 1841); P. rufifrons (Rüppell, 1842)

= Brants's whistling rat =

Species of rodent

Brants's whistling rat or Brants' whistling rat (Parotomys brantsii) is one of two species of murid rodent in the genus Parotomys. It is found in Botswana, Namibia, and South Africa where its natural habitats are subtropical or tropical dry shrubland and pastureland. It was first described in 1834 by the Scottish zoologist Andrew Smith who named it in honour of the Dutch zoologist and author Anton Brants.

== Description ==
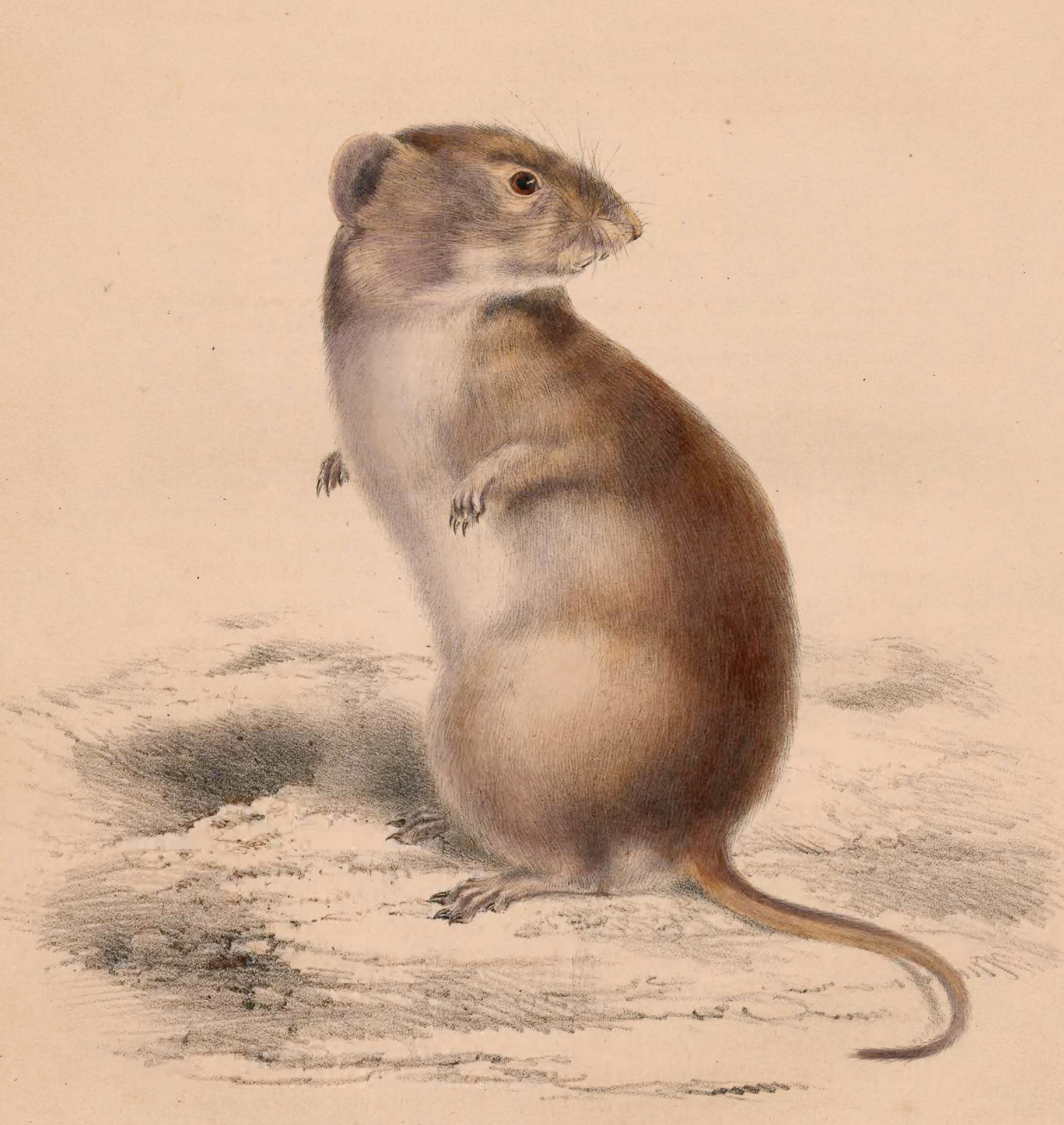
Parotomys brantsii (Euryotis brantsii) by Andrew Smith (1849)

Brants's whistling rat is a fairly large species with a short, blunt head. Males have a head-and-body length of about 215 mm (8.5 in) while females are a little smaller. The tail is about two thirds the length of the head-and-body. The tail measures 7.5 to 10.5 cm. The head is greyish-white, with a rufous snout and forehead. The ears are large and rounded, with dark skin and short hairs. The fur is dense and soft; the dorsal pelage is yellowish, speckled with brownish-black, individual hairs having dark grey bases and yellowish tips. There is also a scattering of long, pure black hairs, especially along the spine. The flanks are rather paler, and the ventral pelage is pale grey, the individual hairs having pale grey bases and whitish or pale yellow tips. The legs are short, the feet having long, narrow claws and four digits on the front feet and five on the hind feet. The tail is well-covered with hair, being dark brown above and orangish-red on the sides and underneath.

== Ecology ==
This rat exists in a complex burrow system with multiple entrances and several nesting chambers. In Namaqualand, the burrows were found to occupy an average of 73 m^{2} (786 sq ft) and average 93 entrances. This multiplicity of entrances, some in the open and some in concealed locations, help the diurnal rodent to take cover rapidly when predators threaten. On spotting a potential danger, a high-pitched whistling warning call is made; this is brief for an imminent danger, such as a fast-flying bird of prey, but is more prolonged for a slow-moving threat, such as a snake. Population size varies, with densities of over 50 individuals per hectare in favourable breeding seasons.

Brants's whistling rat does not exhibit any special physiological adaptations to reduce water loss in its arid environment, and obtains all its water needs from its plant foods. It is active in air temperatures between 23 and 37 °C (73 and 99 °F), and the burrow temperature is relatively stable despite wide swings in the outside temperature. It is most active in the early morning and the period approaching dusk, remaining underground during the hottest parts of the day. Where possible, foraging takes place from within the burrow, and the animal rarely ventures beyond 30 cm (12 in) of a burrow entrance. The diet consists of leaves, stems, grasses, succulents and bulbs, but not seeds or other dry materials.

== Status ==
Brants's whistling rat has a wide range which includes several protected areas. It is a common species with a long-term stable population, facing no particular threats, and the International Union for Conservation of Nature has assessed its conservation status as being of "least concern". However climate change may adversely affect it in the future, as it has no particular adaptations for high temperature conditions and this may limit its ability to forage.
