= Nagarhole National Park =

National park in Karnataka, India

Nagarahole National Park
- IUCN category II (national park)
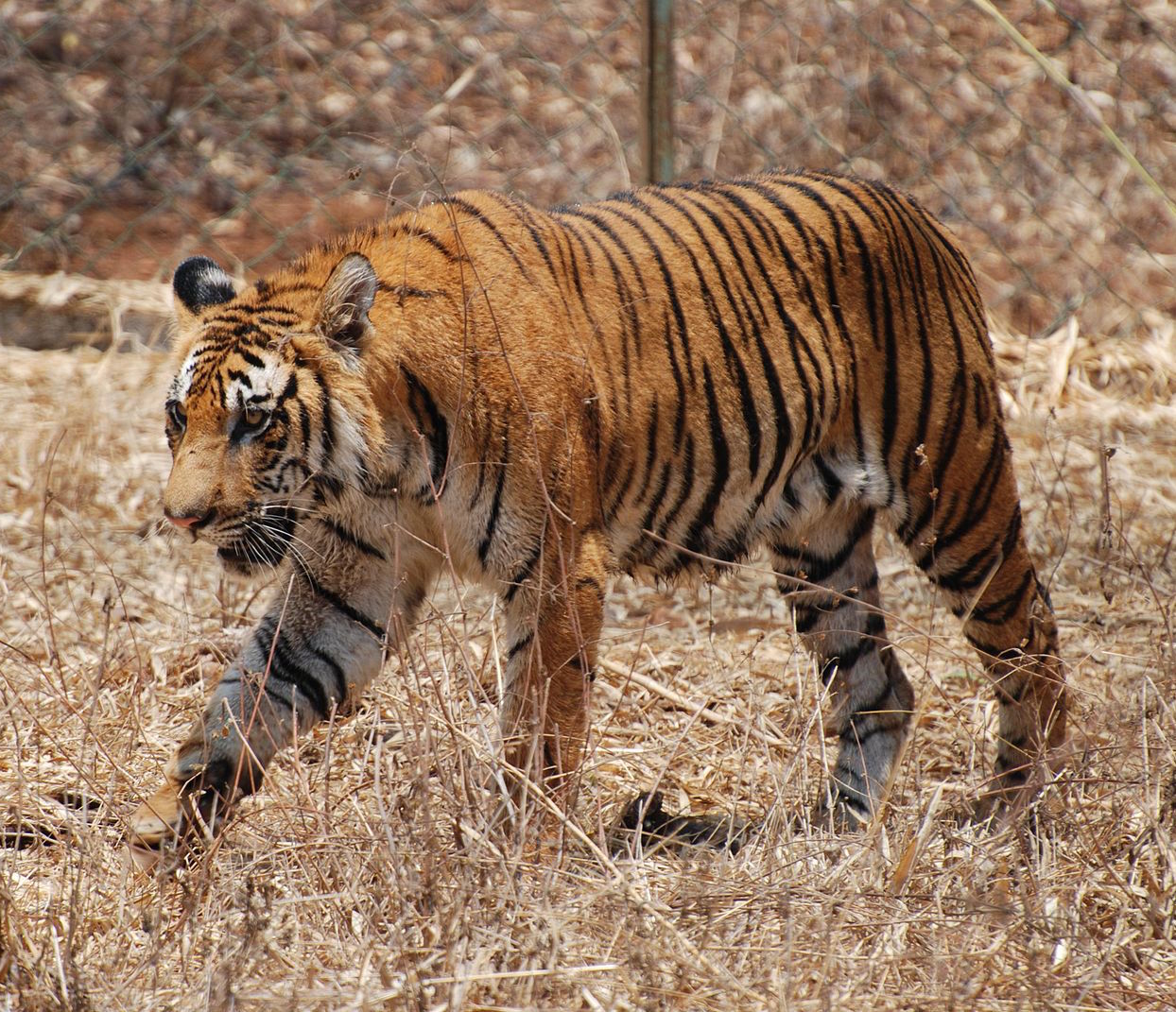
- Tiger in Nagarhole National Park

- Location within Karnataka Location within India
- Interactive map of Nagarahole National Park
- Location: Karnataka, India
- Coordinates: 12°3′36″N 76°9′4″E
- Area: 847.98 km^{2} (327.41 sq mi)
- Elevation: 960 m (3,150 ft)
- Established: 1983

Nagarahole National Park is a national park located in Kodagu district and Mysore district in Karnataka, India. This park was declared the 37th Tiger Reserve of India in 2003. It is part of the Nilgiri Biosphere Reserve. The Western Ghats Nilgiri Sub-Cluster of 6,000 km^{2} (2,300 sq mi), including all of Nagarhole National Park, is under consideration by the UNESCO World Heritage Committee for selection as a World Heritage Site. The park has rich forest cover, small streams, hills, valleys and waterfalls, and populations of Bengal tiger, gaur, Indian elephant, Indian leopard, chital and Sambar deer.

== Geography ==
The park ranges the foothills of the Western Ghats spreading down the Brahmagiri hills and south towards Kerala state. It lies between the latitudes 12°15'37.69"N and longitudes 76°17'34.4"E. The park covers 847.98 km^{2} (327.41 sq mi) located to the north-west of Bandipur National Park. The Kabini reservoir separates the two parks. Elevation of the park ranges from 700 to 960 m (2,300 to 3,150 ft). Its water sources include the Lakshmmantirtha river, Sarati Hole, Nagar Hole, Balle Halla, Kabini River, four perennial streams, 47 seasonal streams, four small perennial lakes, 41 artificial tanks, several swamps, Taraka Dam and the Kabini reservoir.

== Climate and ecology ==
The park receives an annual rainfall of 1,440 mm (57 in).

== History ==
The park derives its name from nagara, meaning snake and hole, referring to streams. The park was an exclusive hunting reserve of the kings of the Wodeyar dynasty, the former rulers of the Kingdom of Mysore. It was set up in 1955 as a wildlife sanctuary. It was upgraded into a national park in 1983. The park was declared a tiger reserve in 2003 and its area was increased to 643.39 km^{2} (248.41 sq mi). In 2012, the reserve was expanded to a total area of 847.98 km^{2} (327.41 sq mi).

== Flora ==
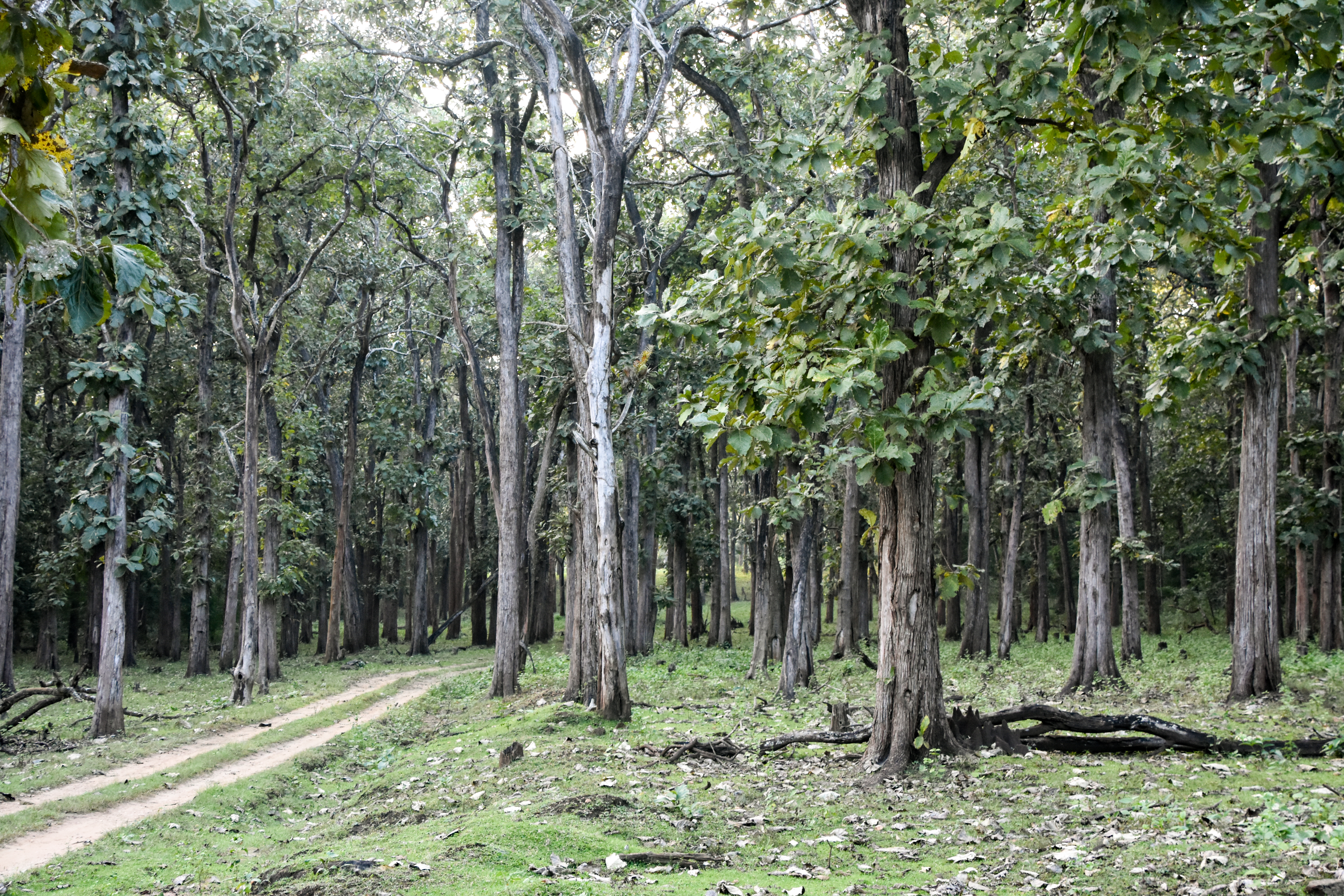
Teak forest in Nagarhole Tiger Reserve

The dry deciduous forest harbour crocodile bark (Terminalia elliptica), crêpe myrtle (Lagerstroemia indica), Indian kino (Pterocarpus marsupium), Grewia tiliifolia and axlewood (Anogeissus latifolia). Other tree species include golden shower (Cassia fistula), flame-of-the-forest (Butea monosperma) and clumping bamboo (Dendrocalamus strictus).

== Fauna ==
=== Mammals ===
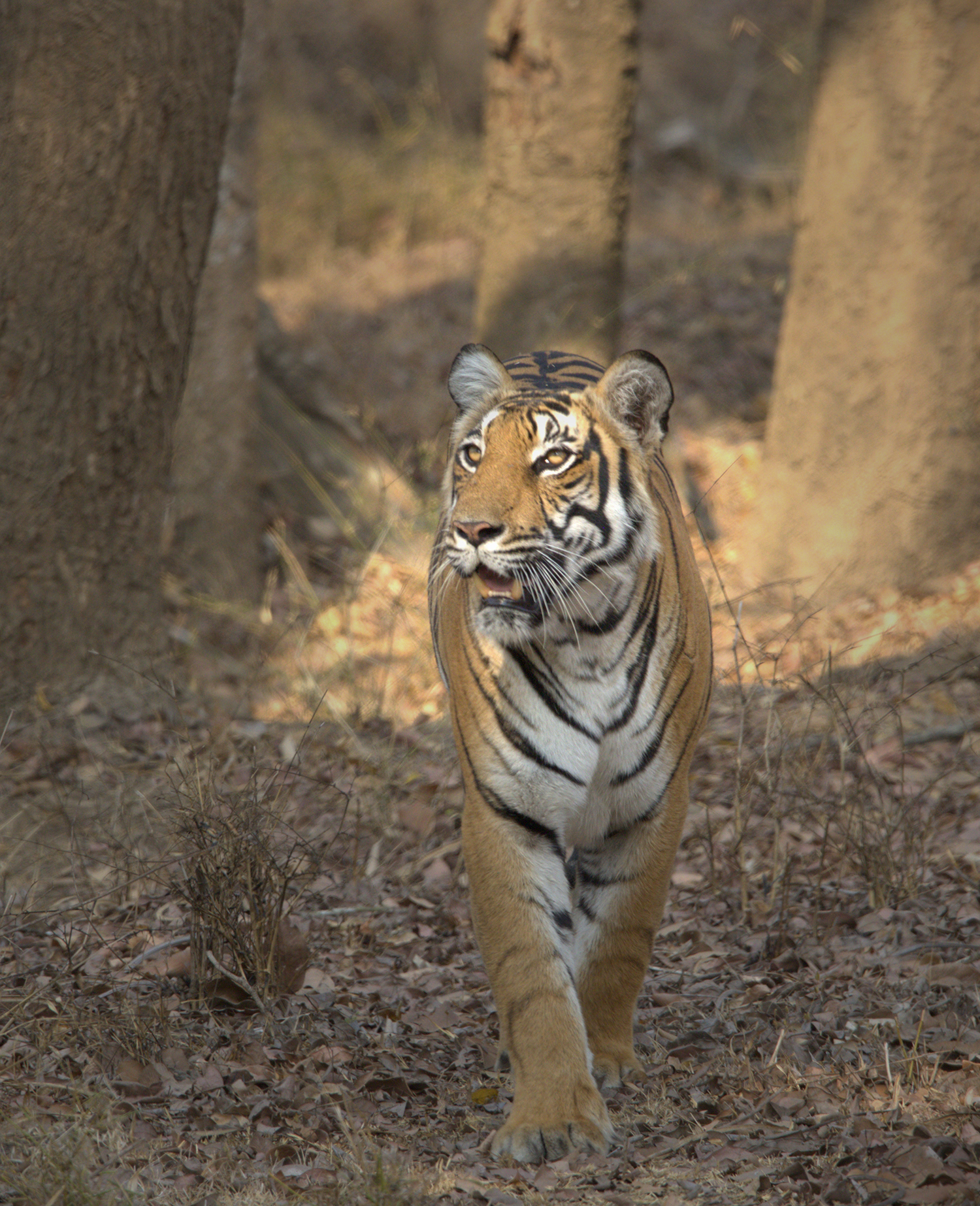
A dominant tigress of Nagarhole tiger reserve.

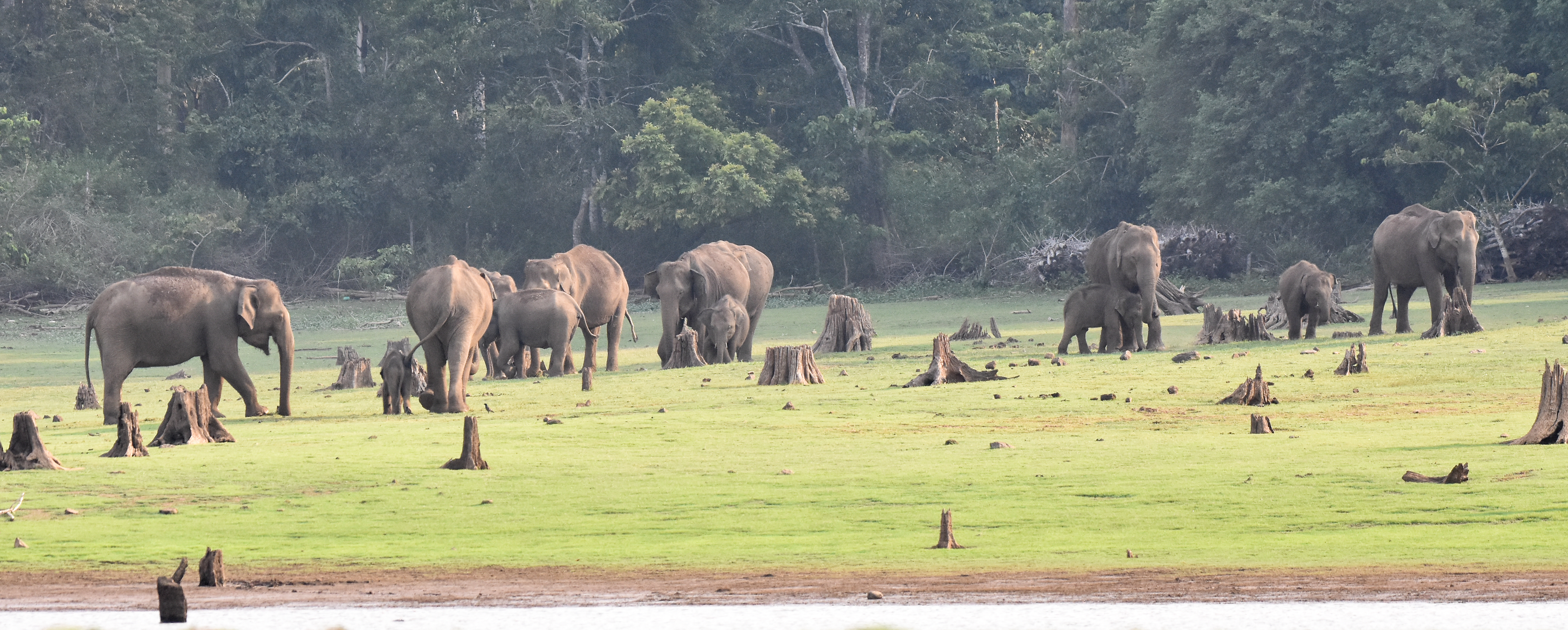
Elephant herd on the bank of the Kabini reservoir

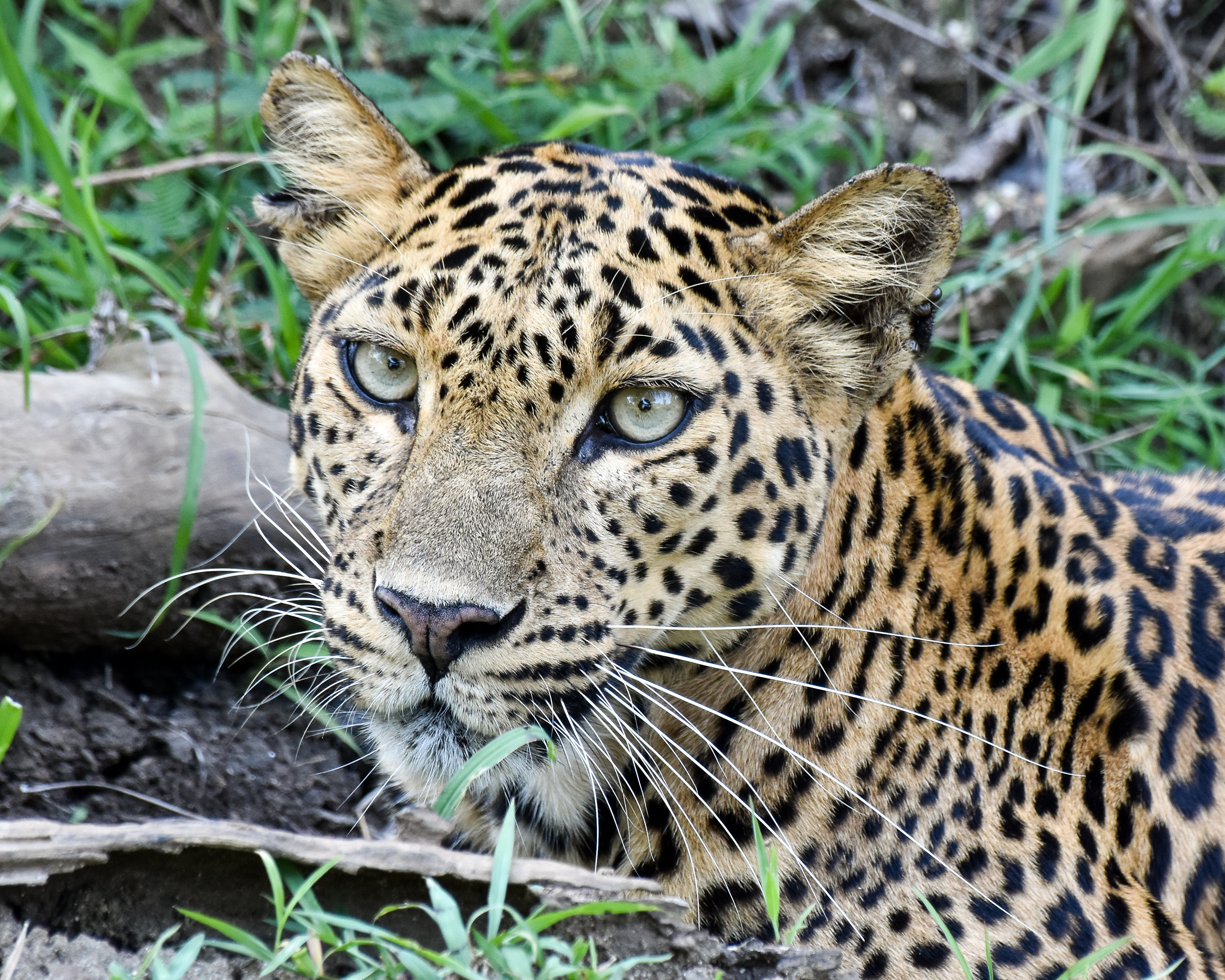
Young female Indian leopard

The big predators in the park are Bengal tiger (Panthera tigris tigris), Indian leopard (Panthera pardus fusca), dhole (Cuon alpinus), Indian jackal (Canis aureus indicus) and sloth bear (Melursus ursinus). Large herbivores include Indian elephant (Elephas maximus indicus), gaur (Bos gaurus), sambar deer (Rusa unicolor), chital (Axis axis), barking deer (Muntiacus muntjak), four-horned antelope (Tetracerus quadricornis) and wild boar (Sus scrofa). Arboreal mammals include gray langur (Presbytes entellus), bonnet macaque (Macaca radiata), red slender loris (Loris tardigradus), red giant flying squirrel (Petaurista petaurista), Indian giant flying squirrel (Petaurista philippensis) and Indian giant squirrel (Ratufa indica). Small predators include jungle cat (Felis chaus), leopard cat (Prionailurus bengalensis), small Indian civet (Viverricula indica), Asian palm civet (Paradoxurus hermaphroditus), Indian grey mongoose (Urva edwardsii), Indian brown mongoose (Urva fuscua), stripe-necked mongoose (Urva vitticolla) and Eurasian otter (Lutra lutra). Other mammals include Indian spotted chevrotain (Moschiola indica), Indian hare (Lepus nigricollis), Indian pangolin (Manis crassicaudata) and Indian crested porcupine (Hystrix indica).

=== Birds ===
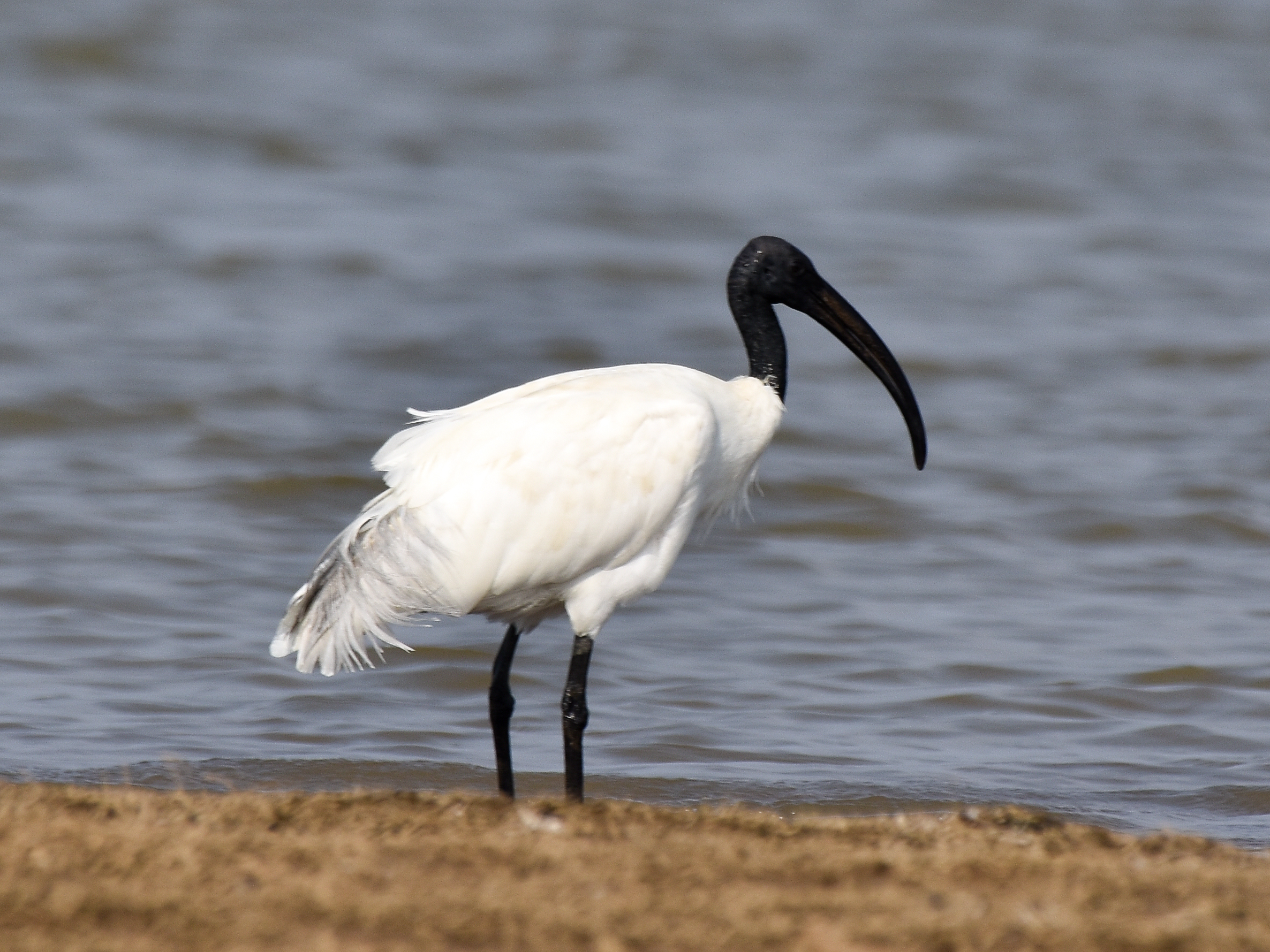
Black-headed ibis (Threskiornis melanocephalus)

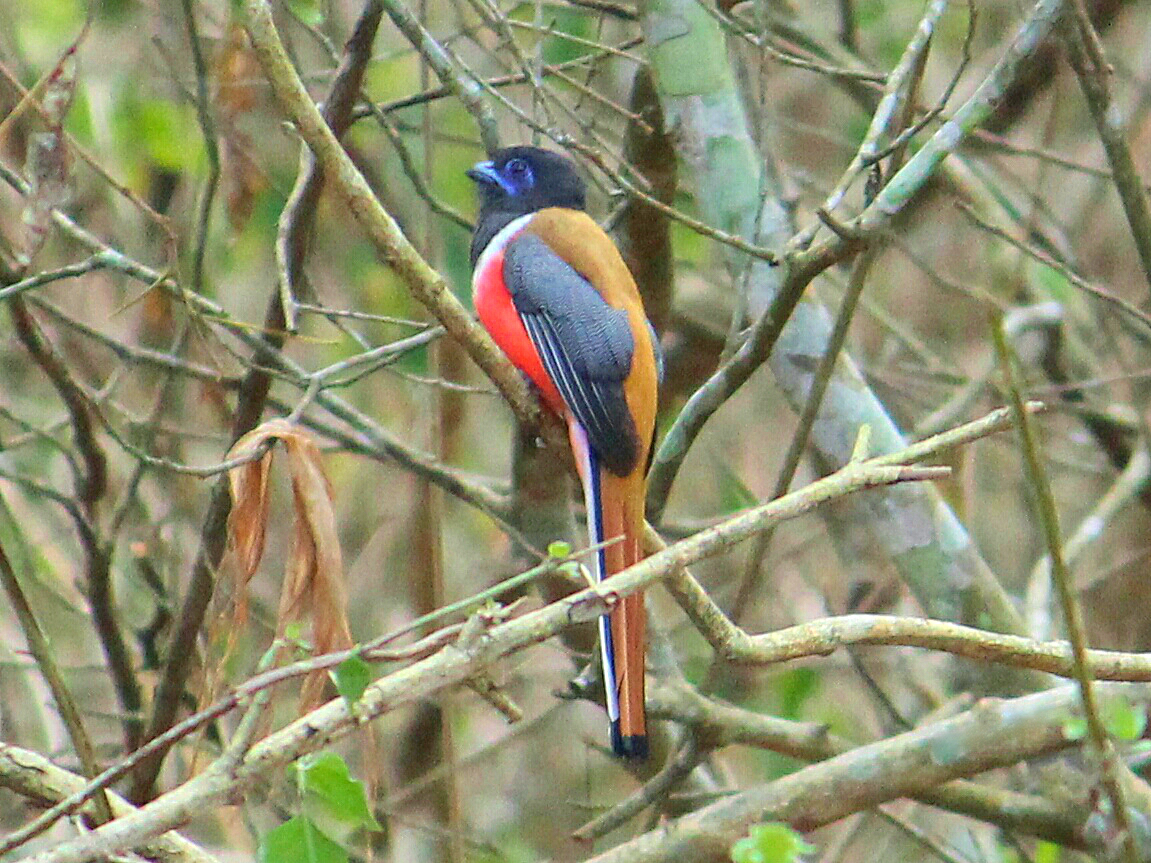
Malabar trogon in Nagarahole

Over 250 species of birds live in Nagarhole National Park. Besides the enormous variety of woodland birds, there are large congregations of waterfowl in the Kabini river. Birds range from blue-bearded bee-eater to the more common osprey, herons and ducks. Recognised as an Important Bird Area, the park has over 270 species of birds, including the white-rumped vulture (Gyps bengalensis), lesser adjutant (Leptopilos javanicus), greater spotted eagle (Clanga clanga) and Nilgiri wood pigeon (Columba elphinstonii). Near threatened species like Oriental darter (Anhniga melanogaster), black-headed ibis (Threskiornis melanocephalus), grey-headed fish eagle (Haliaeetus ichthyaetus) also occur. Endemic species include the blue-winged parakeet (Psittacula columboides), Malabar grey hornbill (Ocyceros griseus), white-bellied treepie (Dendrocitta leucogastra), white-cheeked barbet (Psilopogon viridis), Indian scimitar babbler (Pomatorhinus horsfieldii), Malabar trogon (Harpactes fasciatus) and Malabar whistling thrush (Myophonus horsfieldii). Birds seen in drier regions include painted bush quail (Perdicula erythrorhyncha), Sirkeer malkoha (Taccocua leschenaultii), ashy prinia (Prinia socialis), Indian robin (Copsychus fulicatus), Indian peafowl (Pavo cristatus) and yellow-footed green pigeon (Treron phonyceptaurus).

=== Reptiles and amphibians ===
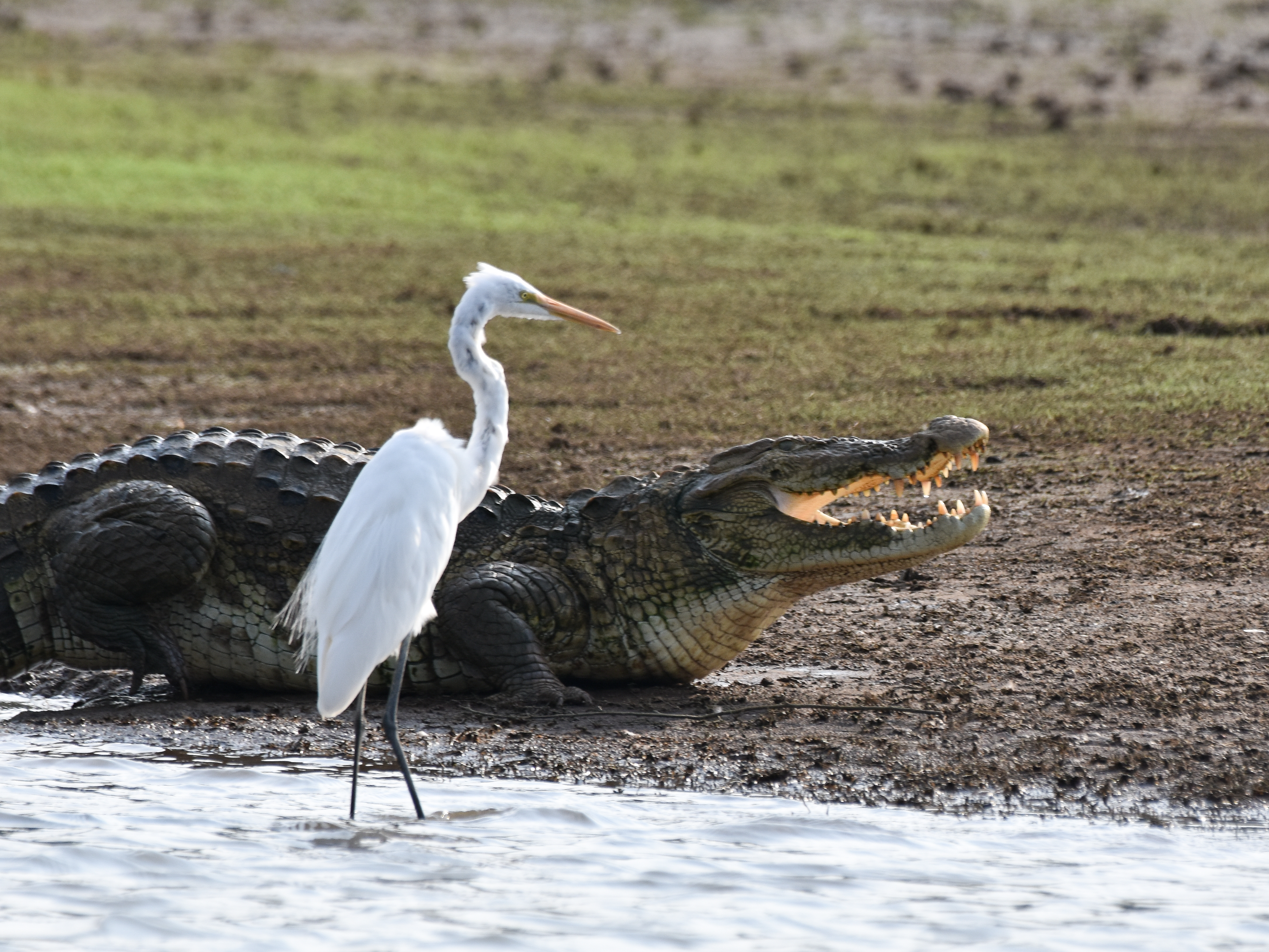
Great egret (Ardea alba) and mugger crocodile in the Kabini Reservoir

Common reptiles include the mugger crocodile (Crocodylus palustris), Asian vine snake (Ahaetulla genus), Indian wolf snake (Lycodon aulicus), Oriental ratsnake (Ptyas mucosa), bamboo pit viper (Craspedocephalus gramineus), Russell's viper (Daboia russellii), common krait (Bungarus caeruleus), Indian python (Python molurus), Bengal monitor (Varanus bengalensis). Amphibians include Chunam tree frog (Polypedates maculatus), green pond frog (Euphlyctis hexadactylus), golden bullfrog (Hoplobatrachus tigerinus) and Asian common toad (Duttaphrynus melanostictus).

=== Insects ===
The insect biodiversity of Nagarhole National Park includes over 210 species of Butterflies (DOI: https://doi.org/10.11609/jott.9396.17.10.27611-27636) 96 species of dung beetles and 60 ant species. Unusual species of ants that have been identified, including the jumping ants, such as Harpegnathos saltator. The ant species Tetraponera rufonigra may be useful as a marker for the forest health because these ants feed on termites and are abundant in places where there are many dead trees. Identified dung beetles include Onthophagus dama, Heliocopris dominus and Onthophagus pactolus.

== Tribal and native inhabitants ==
The Jenu Kurubas, primary inhabitants of this forest area, are a tribe in Karnataka state and their traditional practices and rituals are slowly disappearing. The government is restricting their entry inside the National park and forest due to multiple factors including but not limited conservation efforts and bringing the community to the mainstream society. The Ministry of Home Affairs identified the Jenu Kuruba and the Koraga as tribal groups in Karnataka. The Jenu Kurubas are traditional food gatherers and honey collectors. In Kannada, the term 'Jenu' means 'honey' and the term 'kuruba' generally mean 'shepherd'. It is derived from the Kannada word 'kuri' which means 'sheep'. The term kuruba is also associated with non-shepherd communities. They speak a variant form of Kannada commonly known as Jenu-nudi within their family kin group, and Kannada with others. They use Kannada script. According to the Census of 1981, the population of Jenu Kuruba community is 34,747 out of which 17,867 are male and 16,880 are female.

=== Relocation efforts ===
In the last decade there has been enormous activity undertaken both by the Government and NGOs to relocate tribal people to the periphery of the forests. The relocation efforts are part of a larger focus to conserve the existing tiger population and elephant habitat, which were under serious threat due to change in lifestyles of the tribal residents within the forests. There has been much resistance to relocation efforts from the tribal groups. Many schools and houses have been built with basic amenities like lighting, hospitals and roads to support the relocated tribal population.

In May 2025, 50 Jenu Kuruba families returned to Karadikallu Atturu Kolli village in Nagarhole Tiger Reserve, 40 years after they were evicted.

In June 2025, Survival International reported that 250 forest guards, tiger force members and police had raided the village, tearing down seven forest shelters where women, children and older people were staying.

== Threats and conservation efforts ==
Threats to the national park come from a large-scale cutting of sandalwood and teak trees. Timber smuggling, especially sandalwood smuggling, happens quite extensively here. Timber felling has been reported from plantation areas in Kollihadi, Vadodara Modu, Tattikere in Veerahosanahalli, and Mettiupe in Kalahari. Other places where timber felling has been reported include Arekatti, Badrikatte, Bidurukatte, Veerana Hosahalli, and Marhigodu ranges. In July 2002, hundreds of trees were cut down in the Veeranahosalli range. A study carried out between 1996 and 1997 revealed that hunting was the biggest threat to wildlife in Kudremukh and Nagarhole National Parks. The survey carried out on 49 actives and 19 retired hunters revealed that 26 species of wildlife were hunted at an average intensity of 216 hunter days per month per village. As much as 48% of the hunters reported hunting for the 'thrill'. The study showed that in Nagarhole, 16 mammal species weighing over 1 kg were regularly hunted with shotguns and also by traditional methods used by tribal communities. Poaching of birds and other mammals is another serious issue. A high number of elephant deaths have been reported from this park, with nearly 100 elephants dying between 1991–92 and 2004–05 in the Kodagu and Hunsur Forest Division (PA Update 2005). Elephants are killed for their ivory. A study carried out by Wildlife First! found that nearly 77 elephants were reported dead between 1 January 2000 and 31 October 2002. Another study carried out by the Institute for Natural Resources, Conservation, Education, Research and Training (INSERT) in 2002 revealed that as many as seven elephants had been killed earlier that year.

A report submitted by the Project Tiger Steering Committee stated that barely 25% of the park's staff were involved in vigilance work, thus putting the park at high risk of both, poaching and tree felling. Irregular payment to the forestry staff has been reported in both Bandipur and Nagarhole National Parks and there have also been reports of improper use of project funds. In January 2012, there was a catastrophic forest fire that destroyed over 6,000 acres (2,400 ha) of forest. Huge trees were reduced to cinder. Burnt remains of snakes, monitor lizards, giant Malabar squirrels lay scattered on the charred remains of what was once a verdant patch of moist-deciduous forest. Forest fires and seasonal droughts coupled with water shortage have caused many wild animals to migrate to other greener spaces.

In 1997, tribal activist groups won public interest litigation in the Karnataka High Court to halt the setting up of a resort called the Gateway Tusker Lodge. With nearly 125 villages present inside the park, NGOs actively working to protect the tribal communities include, Living Inspiration for Tribals (LIFT), Coorg Organisation of Rural Development (CORD), DEED, FEDINA-VIKASA and Nagarhole Budakattu Janara Hakkustapana Samithi. In 2000, the first relocation attempts initiated by a World Bank-funded eco-development project of the local tribal population was begun with 50 tribal people. The relocated families were given land possession certificates for five acres of land and houses at Veeranahosalli, near Hunsur. The state and union government planned to relocate 1,550 tribal families at a cost of ₹155 million.

== See also ==
- D.B.Kuppe
- Mananthavady Road

== Literature ==
- K K Gurung & Raj Singh: Field Guide to the Mammals of the Indian Subcontinent, Academic Press, San Diego, ISBN 0-12-309350-3
- William Riley, laura Riley: Nature's Strongholds. The World's Great Wildlife Reserves. Princeton University Press, 2005. ISBN 0-691-12219-9
- "ecoinfoindia.org". ecoinfoindia.org. Archived from the original on 14 July 2012.
- Kazmierczak, K. 2000. A field guide to the birds of India, Sri Lanka, Pakistan, Nepal, Bhutan, Bangladesh and the Maldives. OM Book Service, New Delhi, India. 352 pp.
- Menon, V. 2003. A field guide to Indian mammals. DK (India) Pvt Ltd and Penguin Book India (P) Ltd. 201 pp.
