= Colobonthophagus =

Scientific classification
- Domain: Eukaryota
- Kingdom: Animalia
- Phylum: Arthropoda
- Class: Insecta
- Order: Coleoptera
- Suborder: Polyphaga
- Infraorder: Scarabaeiformia
- Family: Scarabaeidae
- Subfamily: Scarabaeinae
- Tribe: Onthophagini
- Genus: Onthophagus
- Subgenus: Colobonthophagus; Balthasar, 1935

Subgenus of beetles

Colobonthophagus is a subgenus of scarab beetles in the genus Onthophagus of the family Scarabaeidae. There are more than 30 described species in Colobonthophagus. They are found in the Palaearctic and Indomalaya.

== Species ==
These 31 species belong to the subgenus Colobonthophagus:

- Onthophagus aenescens (Wiedemann, 1823)
- Onthophagus agnus Gillet, 1925
- Onthophagus armatus Blanchard, 1853
- Onthophagus arunensis Scheuern, 1995
- Onthophagus bengalensis Harold, 1886
- Onthophagus bison Boucomont, 1919
- Onthophagus caprai Frey, 1956
- Onthophagus dama (Fabricius, 1798)
- Onthophagus ephippioderus Arrow, 1907
- Onthophagus hindu Arrow, 1931
- Onthophagus lahorensis Kabakov, 2008
- Onthophagus lunatus Harold, 1868
- Onthophagus metalliceps Arrow, 1931
- Onthophagus nagasawai Matsumura, 1938
- Onthophagus neocolobus Scheuern, 1996
- Onthophagus occipitalis Lansberge, 1885
- Onthophagus paliceps Arrow, 1931
- Onthophagus pardalis (Fabricius, 1798)
- Onthophagus piceorufulus Kabakov, 1994
- Onthophagus piffli Petrovitz, 1961
- Onthophagus poggii Scheuern, 1996
- Onthophagus quadridentatus (Fabricius, 1798)
- Onthophagus ramosellus Bates, 1891
- Onthophagus ramosus (Wiedemann, 1823)
- Onthophagus shillongensis Scheuern, 1995
- Onthophagus thai Kabakov, 1994
- Onthophagus tragoides Boucomont, 1914
- Onthophagus tragus (Fabricius, 1792)
- Onthophagus transquadridentatus Scheuern, 1995
- Onthophagus triceratops Arrow, 1913
- Onthophagus urellus Boucomont, 1919
