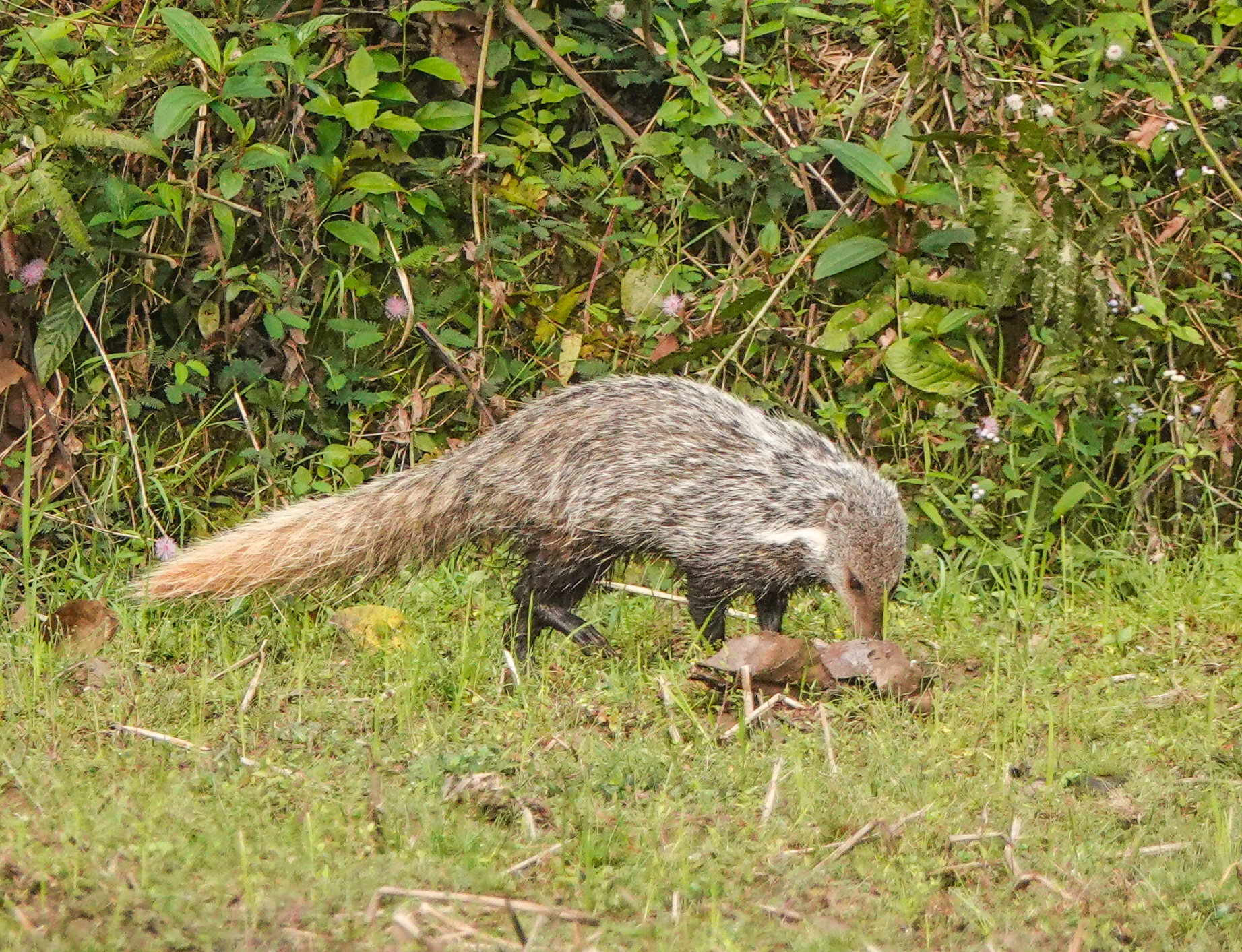

Conservation status
- Least Concern (IUCN 3.1)
- CITES Appendix III

Scientific classification
- Kingdom: Animalia
- Phylum: Chordata
- Class: Mammalia
- Order: Carnivora
- Family: Herpestidae
- Genus: Urva
- Species: U. urva

Binomial name
- Urva urva (Hodgson, 1836)

Subspecies
- U. u. urva; U. u. annamensis; U. u. formosanus; U. u. sinensis
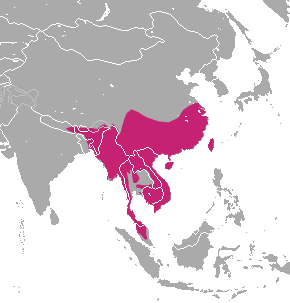
- Distribution of the crab-eating mongoose

Synonyms
- Gulo urva Herpestes urva

= Crab-eating mongoose =

Species of mongoose from Asia

The crab-eating mongoose (Urva urva) is a species of mongoose found from the north-eastern Indian subcontinent and Southeast Asia to southern China and Taiwan. It is listed as least concern on the IUCN Red List.

== Taxonomy ==
Gulo urva was the scientific name introduced by Brian Houghton Hodgson in 1836 who first described the type specimen that originated in central Nepal. It was later classified in the genus Herpestes, but all Asian mongooses are now thought to belong in the genus Urva, of which U. urva is the type species.

== Characteristics ==
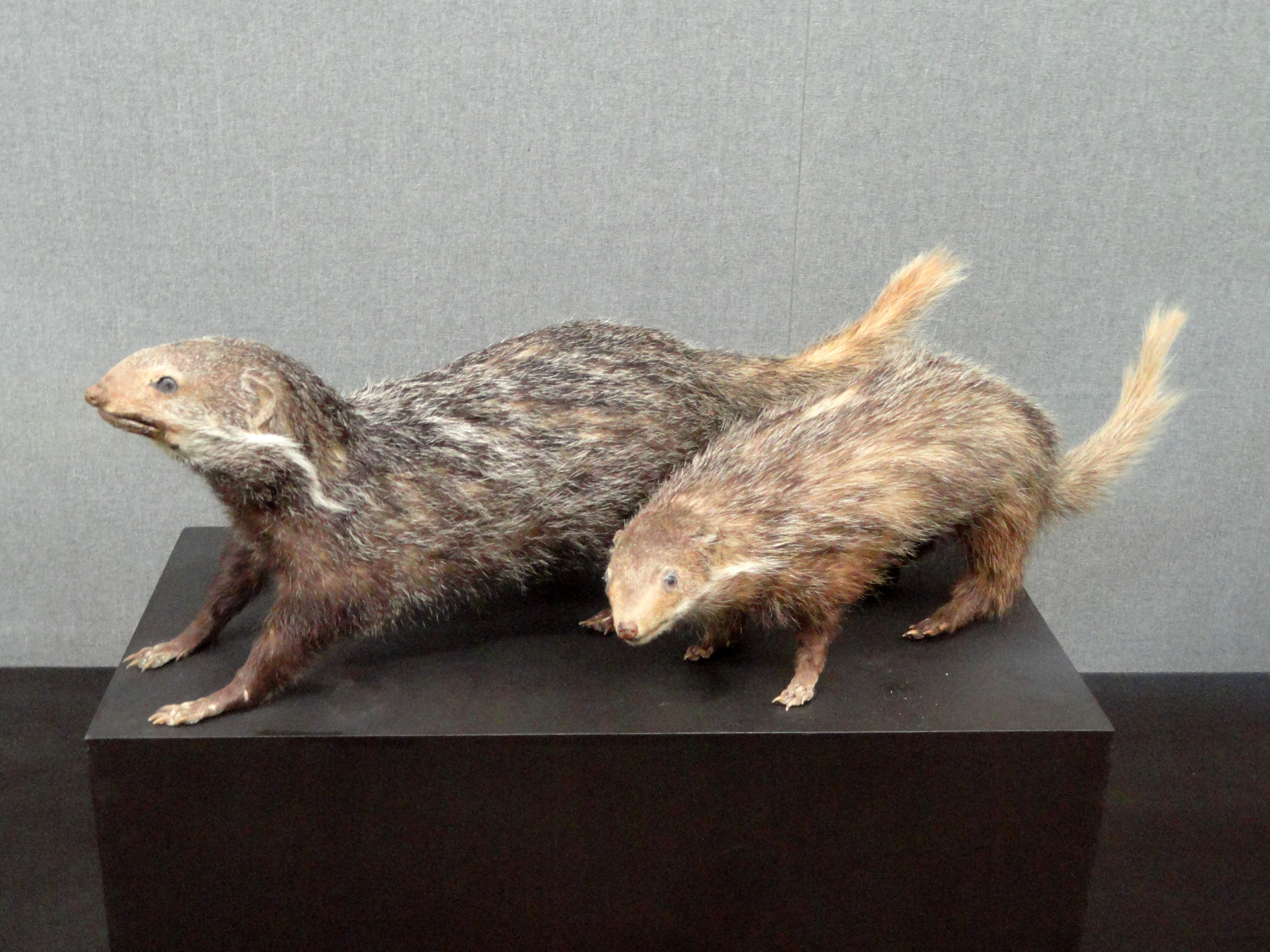
Taxidermy exhibit in the Kunming Natural History Museum of Zoology, China

The crab-eating mongoose is grey on the sides and dusky brown on neck, chest, belly and limbs. It has a broad white stripe on the sides of the neck extending from the cheeks to the shoulder. It has white specks on the top of the head, its chin is white and its throat gray. Its iris is yellow. Its ears are short and rounded. It has webs between the digits. In head-to-body length it ranges from 47.7 to 55.8 cm (18.8 to 22.0 in) with a 28 to 34 cm (11 to 13 in) long bushy tail. Its weight ranges from 1.1 to 2.5 kg (2.4 to 5.5 lb).

== Distribution and habitat ==
The crab-eating mongoose occurs in northeastern India, northern Myanmar, Thailand, Peninsular Malaysia, Laos, Cambodia, and Vietnam. It is rare in Bangladesh. It has been recorded at altitudes from sea level to 1,800 m (5,900 ft).

In Nepal, it inhabits subtropical evergreen and moist deciduous forests, and has also been observed on agricultural land near human settlements. In India, it was recorded in Assam, Arunachal Pradesh and Uttarakhand. In Bangladesh, it was recorded in the eastern forested hills in Sylhet and Chittagong areas. In Myanmar, it was recorded in the Bumhpa Bum hills at up to 930 m (3,050 ft) altitude, in Hukawng Valley, Alaungdaw Kathapa National Park, Bago Yoma and Myinmoletkat Taung during surveys between 2001 and 2003. In China's Guangxi, Guangdong and Hainan provinces, it was recorded in subtropical limestone forest during interview and camera-trapping surveys carried out between 1997 and 2005.

== Ecology and behaviour ==
Crab-eating mongooses are usually active in the mornings and evenings, and were observed in groups of up to four individuals. They are supposed to be good swimmers, and hunt along the banks of streams and close to water.

Despite their common name, their diet consists not only of crabs, but also just about anything else they can catch, including fish, snails, frogs, rodents, birds, reptiles, and insects.

== Conservation ==
Urva urva is listed in CITES Appendix III.
