= Hose's mongoose =

Scientific classification
- Kingdom: Animalia
- Phylum: Chordata
- Class: Mammalia
- Order: Carnivora
- Family: Herpestidae
- Genus: Herpestes
- Species: H. brachyurus
- Subspecies: H. b. hosei

Trinomial name
- Herpestes brachyurus hosei Jentink, 1903

Synonyms
- Herpestes hosei

Subspecies of carnivore

Hose's mongoose (Herpestes brachyurus hosei) is a subspecies of the short-tailed mongoose, but it is sometimes considered a separate species instead, Herpestes hosei. It is only known from a single specimen, an adult female taken in the Baram district, Sarawak, Malaysia, in 1893. Apart from having reddish brown short hair, straighter claws and more slender, smaller skull with a less rounded coronoid process on the lower jaw, it resembles other subspecies of the short-tailed mongoose.
