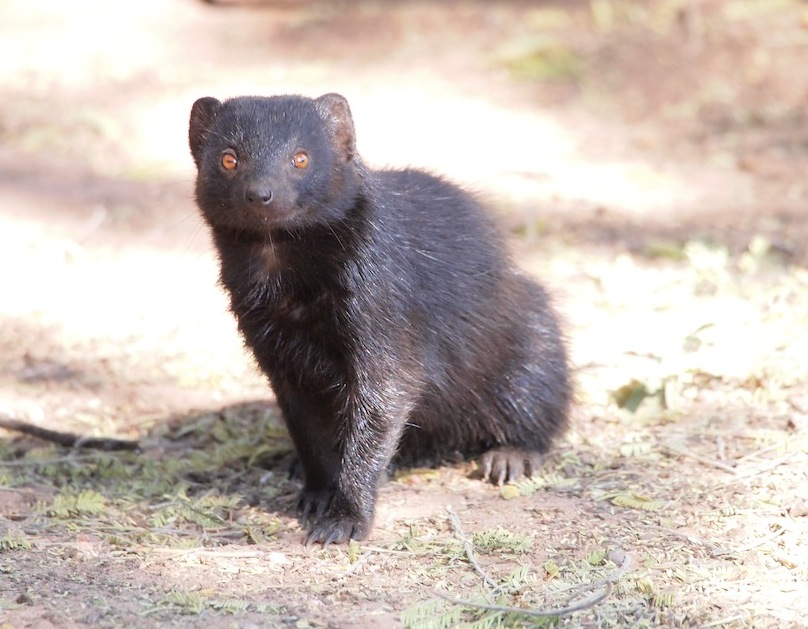

Scientific classification
- Kingdom: Animalia
- Phylum: Chordata
- Class: Mammalia
- Order: Carnivora
- Family: Herpestidae
- Genus: Herpestes
- Species: H. flavescens
- Subspecies: H. f. nigratus

Trinomial name
- Herpestes flavescens nigratus Thomas, 1928

Synonyms
- Myonax nigratus

= Black mongoose =

African mongoose subspecies

The black mongoose (Herpestes flavescens nigratus) is a subspecies of the Angolan slender mongoose occurring in Namibia and Angola. Although originally described as a separate species by Oldfield Thomas in 1928, it has often been considered a subspecies of the slender mongoose (H. sanguinea). However, genetic analysis indicated that it was distinct, and it was later classified as a distinct species. However, more evidence indicates that it is in fact conspecific with the Angolan slender mongoose (H. flavescens).

Evidence suggests the slender mongoose and the Angolan slender mongoose, including the black mongoose, diverged around four million years ago, likely due to some populations becoming separated as the habitat in southern Africa was changing. The black mongoose now occupies a distinct habitat in areas with large boulders and rocky outcrops known as inselbergs in the mountainous regions of northwest Namibia and southwest Angola. After remaining in these areas for millions of years, the black mongoose is highly specialized to survive in the harsh arid environment.

== Description ==
The black mongoose resembles the slender mongoose except that its coat is almost entirely black with dark reddish hues on the flank. The black pelage is thought to be an adaptation to provide camouflage in the shadowed crevices between large boulders where they hunt. It has a body mass of about 0.7 to 0.9 kg and a body length of about 6.4 to 7.0 cm with a tail between 3.2 and 3.6 cm.

== Diet and behavior ==
Like other Herpestes in southern Africa, the black mongoose has a broad diet, consuming adult, larval, and pupal Sarcophagid flies and other insects, as well as reptiles, birds, small mammals and fruits. They may sometimes scavenge meat but they prefer to eat the flies and larva found near the carcass. The black mongoose is mostly solitary, although occasional congregations may form, such as in the presence of an abundant food source such as the flies found near the rotting carcass of a large animal. Although highly solitary, they are not usually aggressive towards other members of their species and are not known to be territorial. In fact, home ranges of males may overlap up to 100%. However, scent-marking seems to occur through marking with urine and rubbing of the throat and chest on rocks to deposit scent gland products. Individuals usually have multiple dens, which they use sporadically, but they do not share dens between individuals. Males have been known to form temporary hunting pairs, in which one individual flushes out prey for the other. The black mongoose is a stalking predator that will sometimes pursue prey much larger than itself, such as rock hyraxes, but more commonly birds, such as guinea fowl and drongos, and rodents.

== Range and habitat ==
The range of the black mongoose extends from the Kunene River region southward toward the Erongo Mountains of Namibia. It is known as an obligate petrophile because it is highly adapted to living in extremely rocky areas with many large boulders. Individuals have been observed to spend 65% of their time among boulders, where they hunt and build their dens. The species is a habitat specialist and is almost never observed in the relatively open plains found between the isolated granite inselbergs. When in open areas, the black mongoose is vulnerable to predation from raptors such as the African hawk eagle. Home ranges vary widely in size from 12 to 145 hectares.
