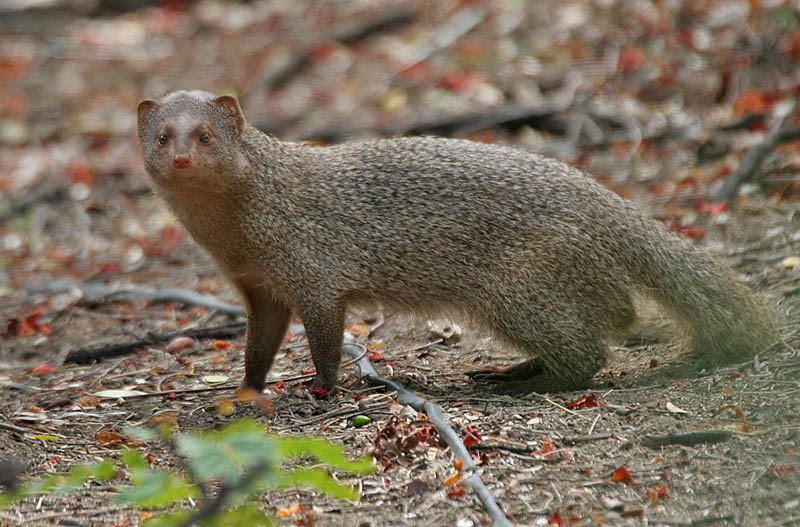
- Indian grey mongoose

Scientific classification
- Kingdom: Animalia
- Phylum: Chordata
- Class: Mammalia
- Order: Carnivora
- Family: Herpestidae
- Subfamily: Herpestinae
- Genus: Urva; Hodgson, 1837

Type species
- Gulo urva Hodgson, 1836

Species
- See table and range map
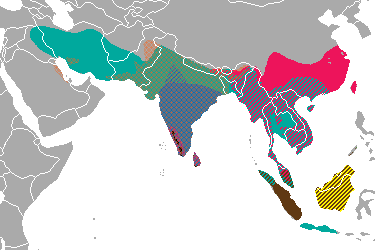
- Native distribution of Urva species: U. javanica; U. edwardsii; U. edwardsii in sympatry with U. javanica; U. smithii in sympatry with U. edwardsii, and locally with U. javanica; U. vitticolla and U. fusca in sympatry with U. smithii and U. edwardsii; U. urva; U. urva in sympatry with U. javanica; U. brachyura; U. semitorquata in sympatry with U. brachyura

= Urva (genus) =

Genus of mongooses

Urva is a genus comprising the Asian mongooses within the mongoose family Herpestidae. Species in the genus were formerly classified in the genus Herpestes, which is now thought to comprise exclusively African mongooses; phylogenetic evidence indicates that the Asian mongooses form a monophyletic group and had an Asian common ancestor. Urva forms a clade with Xenogale and Atilax, while Herpestes forms a clade with all other African mongoose species.

An Urva fossil specimen, an upper molar tooth, was excavated in the Ayeyarwady River valley in central Myanmar and is estimated to date to the late Pliocene.

The scientific name Urva was coined by Brian Houghton Hodgson as the specific name of crab-eating mongoose in 1836, and as the generic name in the following year. Urva species have a wide distribution spanning from the Arabian Peninsula to the Indonesian island of Java. The small Indian mongoose (U. auropunctata) has been introduced to several islands in the late 19th century, where it has become an invasive species.

== Species ==
Urva comprises the following species:

Image	Name	Distribution and IUCN Red List status
	Indian grey mongoose (U. edwardsii) (Geoffroy Saint-Hilaire, 1818)	LC
	Javan mongoose (U. javanica) (Geoffroy Saint-Hilaire, 1818)	LC
	Stripe-necked mongoose (U. vitticolla) (Bennett, 1835)	LC
	Small Indian mongoose (U. auropunctata) Hodgson, 1836	LC
	Crab-eating mongoose (U. urva) Hodgson, 1836	LC
	Ruddy mongoose (U. smithii) (Gray, 1837)	LC
	Short-tailed mongoose (U. brachyura) (Gray, 1837)	NT
	Indian brown mongoose (U. fusca) (Waterhouse, 1838)	LC
	Collared mongoose (U. semitorquata) (Gray, 1846)	NT

=== Extinct genera ===
- †Urva fanchangensis Jiangzuo et al., 2026
