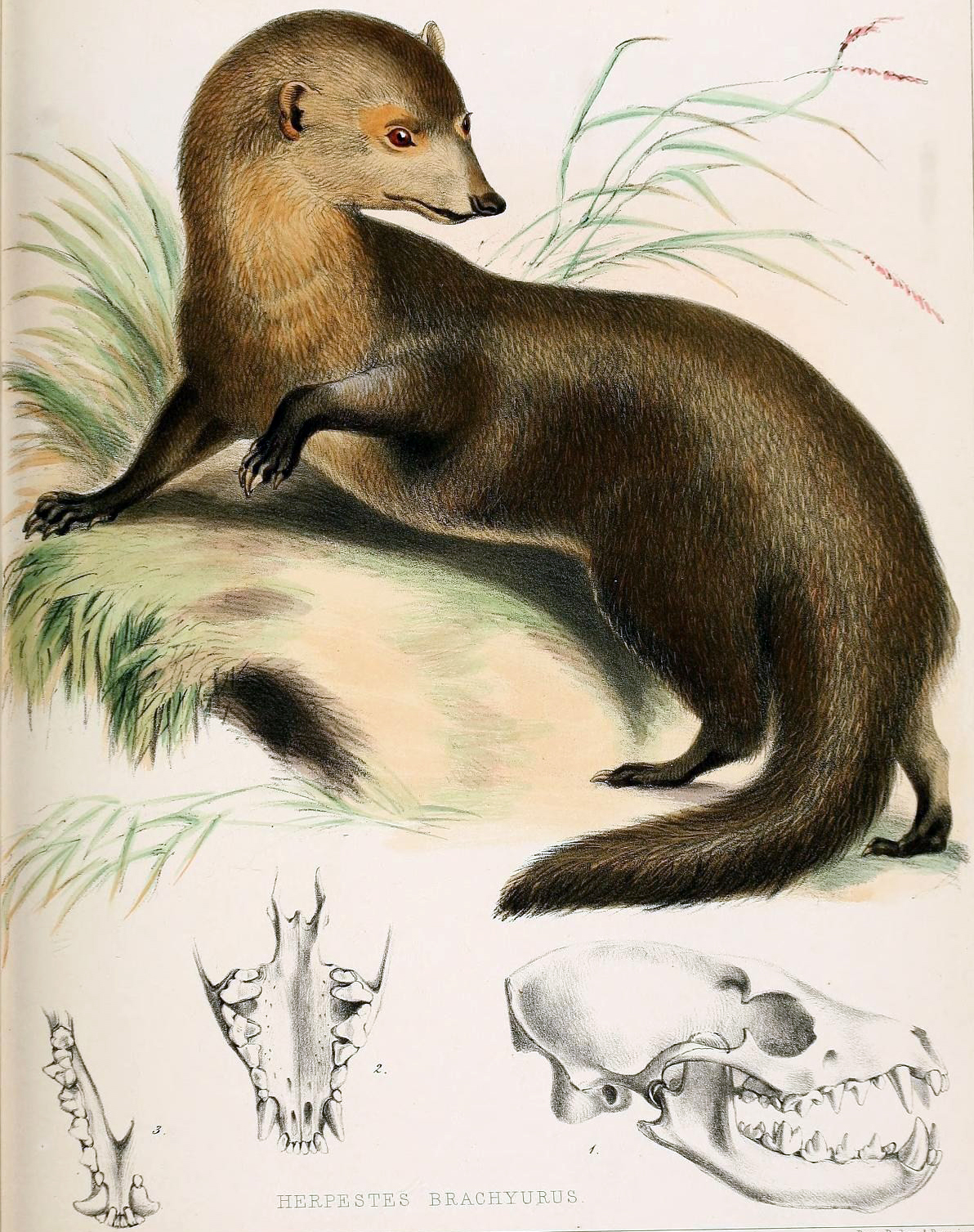

Conservation status
- Near Threatened (IUCN 3.1)

Scientific classification
- Kingdom: Animalia
- Phylum: Chordata
- Class: Mammalia
- Order: Carnivora
- Family: Herpestidae
- Genus: Urva
- Species: U. brachyura

Binomial name
- Urva brachyura (Gray, 1837)
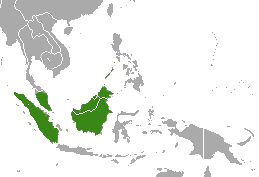
- Short-tailed mongoose range

Synonyms
- Herpestes brachyurus

= Short-tailed mongoose =

Species of mongoose from Southeast Asia

The short-tailed mongoose (Urva brachyura) is a mongoose species native to Peninsular Malaysia, Sumatra and Borneo. It inhabits evergreen forest and rural gardens from sea level to an elevation of 1,500 m (4,900 ft). It is listed as Near Threatened on the IUCN Red List since 2008.

It was first described by John Edward Gray in 1837.

It is red-brown to black and has black limbs. The head is grayish with a black spot on the chin. Its total body length is 60–65 cm (24–26 in) including a 25 cm (9.8 in) short tail. It weighs about 1.4 kg (3.1 lb).

== Subspecies ==
- U. b. brachyura
- U. b. hosei (by some considered a species, Hose's mongoose Herpestes hosei)
- U. b. javanensis
- U. b. palawanus
- U. b. parvus
- U. b. sumatrius
