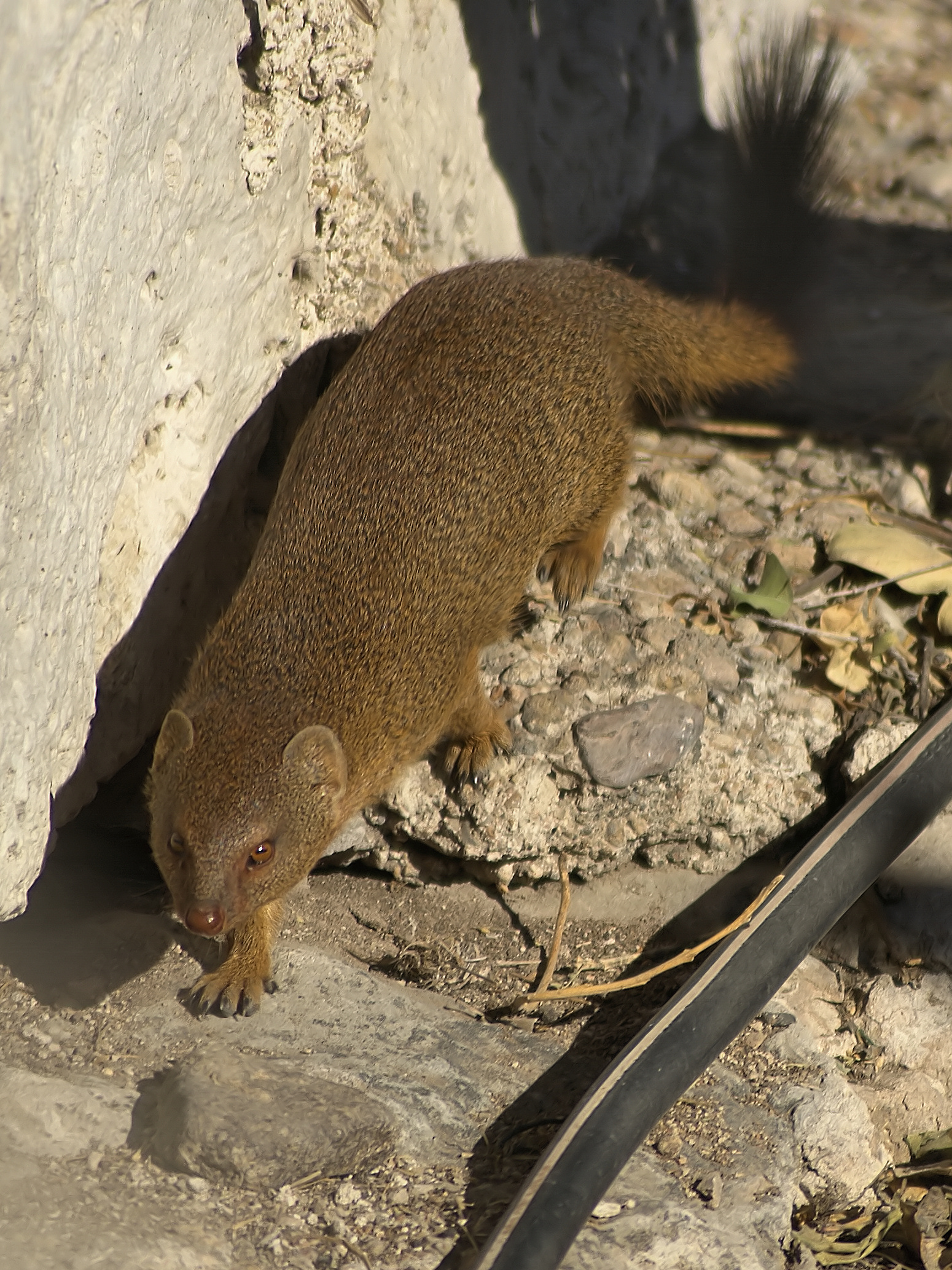
- An individual at Okaukuejo waterhole, Etosha National Park, Namibia

Conservation status
- Least Concern (IUCN 3.1)

Scientific classification
- Kingdom: Animalia
- Phylum: Chordata
- Class: Mammalia
- Order: Carnivora
- Family: Herpestidae
- Genus: Herpestes
- Species: H. flavescens

Binomial name
- Herpestes flavescens Bocage, 1889
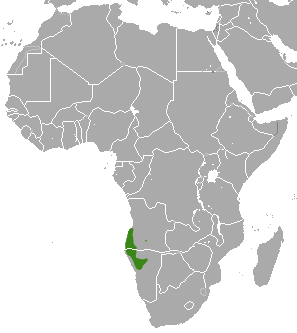
- native range

Synonyms
- Galerella flavescens

= Angolan slender mongoose =

Species of mongoose from Africa

The Angolan slender mongoose (Herpestes flavescens) is a mongoose native to southwestern Africa, specifically southwestern Angola and northwestern Namibia. It has been listed as Least Concern on the IUCN Red List, as it is not threatened and thought to be common. It has a long, slim body and there are different colour forms, a black or dark brown form in the southern part of its range, and a yellowish- or reddish-brown form in the north. This mongoose inhabits dry, rocky habitats and feeds on insects, scorpions and small vertebrates.

== Taxonomy ==
The scientific name Herpestes gracilis var flavescens was proposed by José Vicente Barbosa du Bocage in 1889 who described an adult female collected in Angola's Benguela Province.

The black mongoose (H. f. nigratus) is now thought to be conspecific.

== Description ==
The Angolan slender mongoose is a small, slender species with a long, well-furred tail. Males have a head-and-body length averaging 343 mm (13.5 in) with females smaller at 310 mm (12.2 in), the tail in each case being about 340 mm (13.4 in) in length. The skull is moderately broad and the ears are neat and rounded. This mongoose has several different colour forms; most individuals are black or deep brown, but some individuals are reddish-brown to yellowish-orange, the underparts being yellowish-orange and the tapering tail being a similar colour but with a black tip.

== Distribution and habitat ==
The Angolan slender mongoose is endemic to southern Africa, its range including southwestern Angola and northwestern Namibia. The animals in Namibia are dark brown or black, while those in Angola are mostly the pale morph. Where the two types abut, in the vicinity of the Cunene River, there are no intermediate colour forms. The natural habitat of this mongoose is kopjes, rocky outcrops and areas with large granite boulders, and the woodlands and slopes surrounding these features.

== Ecology ==
This mongoose is diurnal and largely solitary, with a home range of up to 4 km^{2} (1.5 mi^{2}) containing several dens. The ranges often overlap with the neighbouring mongoose. The diet consists largely of insects, solifuges, scorpions, lizards, snakes, small birds and mammals. The mongoose is itself preyed on by larger predators such as the African hawk-eagle.

== Status ==
The Angolan slender mongoose has a somewhat limited range, and though its population size has not been estimated, it seems to be common and no particular threats have been identified. The International Union for Conservation of Nature has rated its conservation status as being of "least concern".
