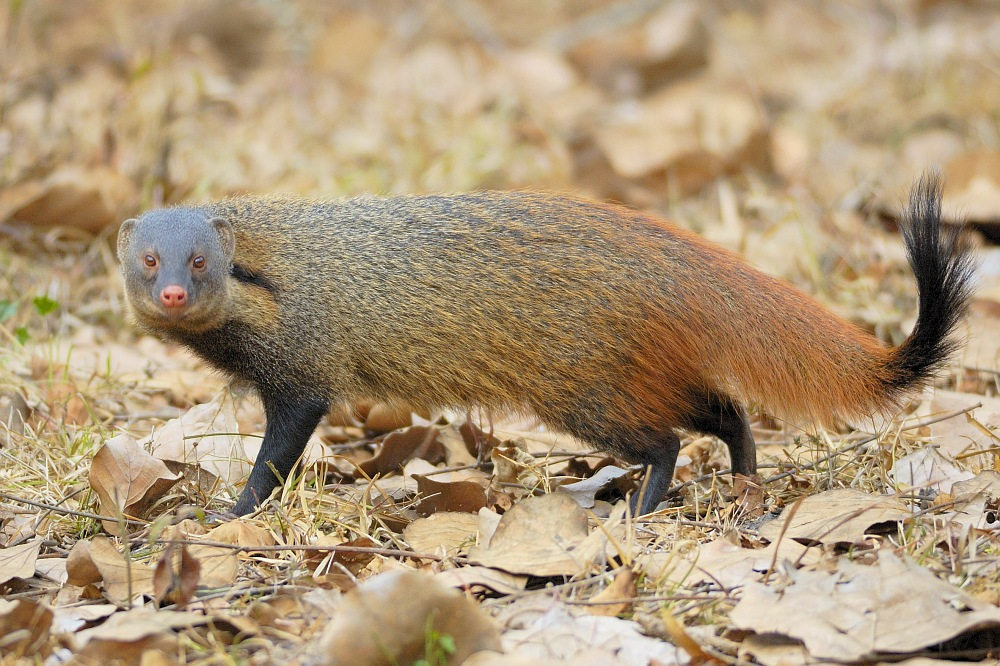
- Adult in Nagarhole National Park

Conservation status
- Least Concern (IUCN 3.1)
- CITES Appendix III

Scientific classification
- Kingdom: Animalia
- Phylum: Chordata
- Class: Mammalia
- Order: Carnivora
- Family: Herpestidae
- Genus: Urva
- Species: U. vitticolla

Binomial name
- Urva vitticolla (Bennett, 1835)
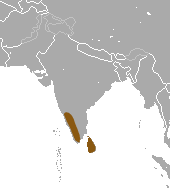
- Stripe-necked mongoose range

Synonyms
- Herpestes vitticollis

= Stripe-necked mongoose =

Species of mongoose from South Asia

The stripe-necked mongoose (Urva vitticolla) is a mongoose species native to forests and shrublands from southern India to Sri Lanka.

== Taxonomy ==
The stripe-necked mongoose was described by Edward Turner Bennett in 1835. Two subspecies are recognised, one with a reddish fur occurring in the Western Ghats, Coorg and Kerala; the other, U. vitticolla inornata, lacks the reddish tint and occurs in Kanara province.

== Description ==
The stripe-necked mongoose is rusty brown to grizzled grey, has a stout body and short legs, a black stripe that runs laterally on both sides of its neck. Its short tail is mostly black, but grey at the base. Head to body length is 46–50 cm (18–20 in) with tail length of 32 cm (13 in). Males are larger and heavier than females with the weight of 3.1 kg (6.8 lb). Females weigh about 1.7 kg (3.7 lb).

== Distribution and habitat ==
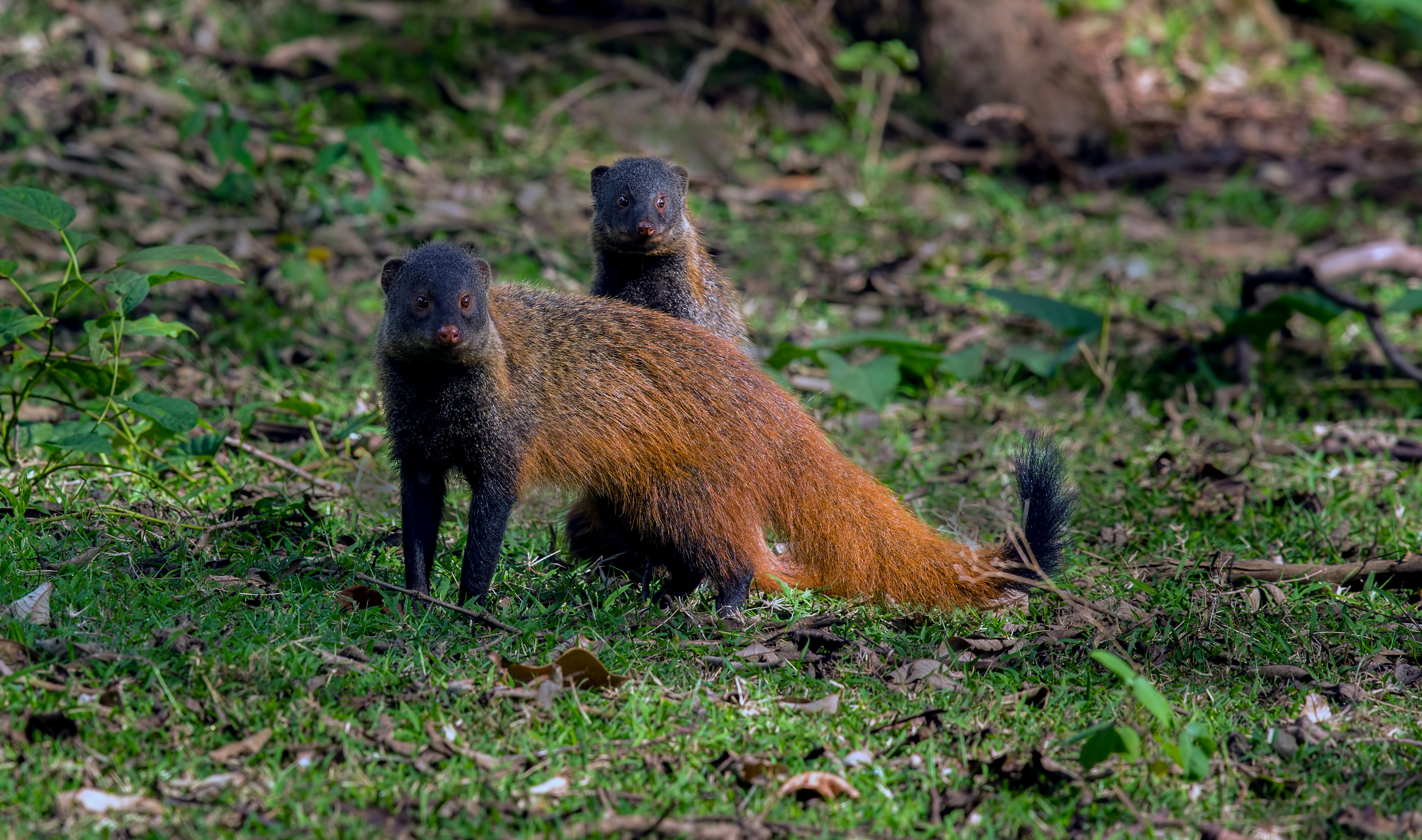
Pair of Stripe-necked mongoose in Nagarhole National Park

The stripe-necked mongoose is distributed in the Western Ghats and in Sri Lanka. In 1911, one individual was observed in southern Andhra Pradesh. It was also recorded in and in Odisha and in Parambikulam Tiger Reserve. In Sri Lanka, it occurs in riparian habitats, near abandoned tanks within protected areas over 2,000 m (6,600 ft) elevation.

== Behaviour and ecology ==
Stripe-necked mongoose seen in Bandipur National Park

The stripe-necked mongoose is diurnal and feeds on frogs, crabs, mouse deer, black naped hares, rodents, fowl, and reptiles. It generally avoids human habitation. Pups have been encountered in mid-May.
