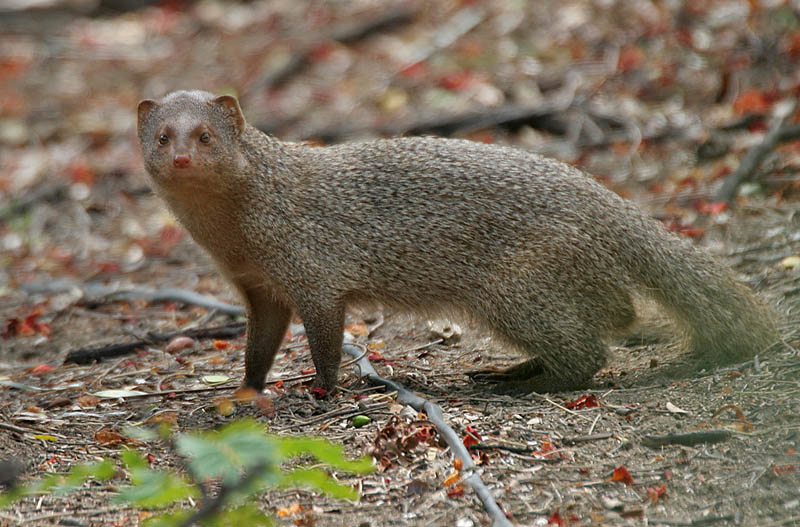
- Adult in Hyderabad

Conservation status
- Least Concern (IUCN 3.1)
- CITES Appendix III

Scientific classification
- Kingdom: Animalia
- Phylum: Chordata
- Class: Mammalia
- Order: Carnivora
- Family: Herpestidae
- Genus: Urva
- Species: U. edwardsii

Binomial name
- Urva edwardsii (É. Geoffroy Saint-Hilaire, 1818)
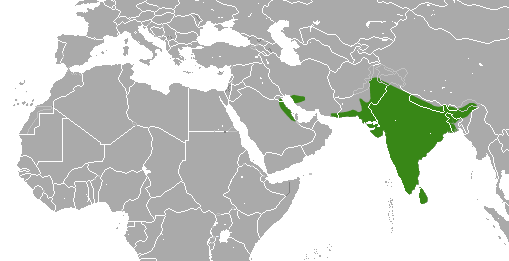
- Indian grey mongoose range

Synonyms
- Ichneumon edwardsii Herpestes edwardsii

= Indian grey mongoose =

Species of mongoose from Asia

The Indian grey mongoose or Asian grey mongoose (Urva edwardsii) is a mongoose species native to the Indian subcontinent and West Asia. It is listed as least concern on the IUCN Red List.

The grey mongoose inhabits open forests, scrublands and cultivated fields, often close to human habitation. It lives in burrows, hedgerows and thickets, among groves of trees, and takes shelter under rocks or bushes and even in drains. It is bold and inquisitive but wary, seldom venturing far from cover. It is an excellent climber and usually lives singly or in pairs. Its prey includes rodents, snakes, birds' eggs and hatchlings, lizards and a variety of invertebrates. Along the Chambal River it occasionally feeds on gharial eggs. It breeds throughout the year.

== Taxonomy ==
Ichneumon edwardsii was the scientific name proposed by Étienne Geoffroy Saint-Hilaire in 1817. It was later classified in the genus Herpestes, but all Asian mongooses are now classified in the genus Urva.

Subspecies:

- U. e. edwardsii
- U. e. ferruginea
- U. e. lanka
- U. e. montana
- U. e. nyula

== Description ==
The Indian grey mongoose has tawny grey or iron grey fur, which is more grizzled and stiffer and coarser than that of other mongooses. The ruddiness of the coat varies in different subspecies, but it described as appearing more grey than other mongooses. The grizzled appearance comes from the individual hairs being ringed by creamy-white and black. The legs are brown and darker than the body. The hair around the muzzle and eyes is also brown but with a stronger rusty red colouring. The tail is bushy, whilst the tip of the tail, if coloured, is pale yellow or white.

Their tail length equals their body length. Body length: 36–45 cm (14–18 in) Tail length: 45 cm (18 in), weight: 0.9–1.7 kg (2–4 lb). Males are significantly larger than the females. Indian grey mongooses are unusual in that they can discriminate four colours, more than most other mammals.

== Distribution and habitat ==
It has been generally accepted that the Indian grey mongoose occurs in Saudi Arabia, Kuwait, Bahrain, Iran, Afghanistan, Pakistan, India, Nepal, Sri Lanka, and Bangladesh, as represented by the distribution map. A 2007 study found specimens also in Turkey, and United Arab Emirates, thus extending the known range.

Despite being a common animal, the natural history of the Indian grey mongoose is not well known. They appear to be able to occupy a wide variety of habitats but preferring open types. These include grasslands, open areas, rocky patches, scrub, semi-desert, cultivated fields and other disturbed areas, areas of thickets, bushy vegetation, dry secondary forest, thorn forest, forest edges, and also near human settlement. Although the creature has been described as being less dependent on human settlements, observations in India in heavily forested areas show it to be much more common around human settlements often scavenging on waste.

== Ecology and behaviour ==
The Indian grey mongoose is omnivorous, though most of its diet is made up from live prey it catches from being an opportunistic hunter, with mice, rats, lizards, snakes, and beetles making up the bulk. Also eaten are ground birds, their eggs, grasshoppers, scorpions, centipedes, frogs, crabs, fish, and parts of plants: fruits, berries, and roots, as well as larger prey including hares and egrets. It kills prey by delivering a bite to the neck or head.

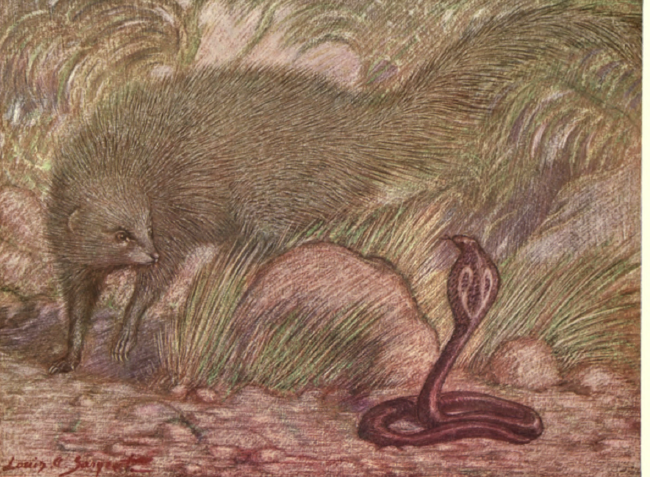
The illustration of Indian grey mongoose and cobra

This species is known for its ability to combat snakes. It primarily achieves this through tiring the snake out, by enticing it to make multiple strikes which it acrobatically avoids. Secondary protection against the venomous bite includes the stiff rigid hair, which is excited at such times; the thick loose skin; and specialised acetylcholine receptors, which render it resistant or immune to snake venom. When dealing with scorpions, no measures are taken to disable the sting, and they are picked up in any manner.

The Indian grey mongoose typically opens eggs by holding them between the paws and biting a hole in the little end. Smaller mongooses typically open eggs by throwing them between their legs against a hard object, so it has been speculated, that the adult Indian grey mongoose should do likewise with large eggs.

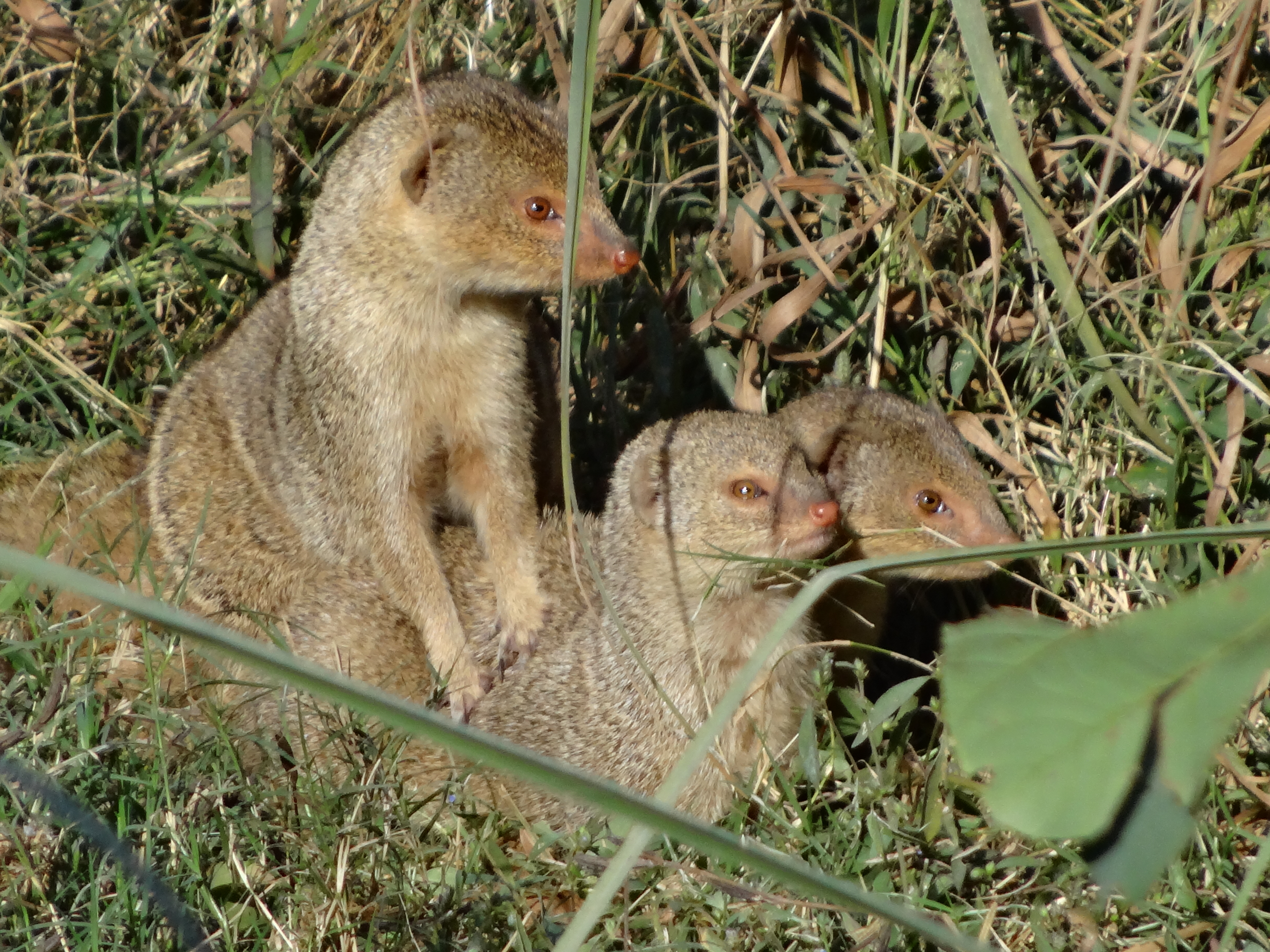
Inquisitive Indian grey mongoose pups at Lucknow Zoological Park.

The Indian grey mongoose mates two to three times each year, between March and October. The gestation period lasts for 60 to 65 days; the female gives birth to two to four offspring.

The lifespan of the Indian grey mongoose is seven years in the wild, or 12 years when in captivity.

== Relation with humans ==
The Indian grey mongoose is often kept as a pet to keep dwellings free from rats and other pests.

The Indian grey mongoose is the state animal of Chandigarh.

The species is protected in India, but an illegal trade in hair for the purposes of making of paint brushes and shaving brushes continues, and this is one of its most significant threats. In 2018 the Uttar Pradesh Forest Department and Wildlife Crime Control Bureau (WCCB) seized 155 kg (342 lb) of raw mongoose hair, for which about 3000 mongoose had been killed.

== Etymology ==
The Indian grey mongoose is called muṅgūs or maṅgūs in classical Hindi; muṅgūsa in Marathi; mungi in Telugu; mungi, mungisi and munguli in Kannada.

== In popular culture ==
"Rikki-Tikki-Tavi" is a short story by Rudyard Kipling about the adventures of a valiant young Indian grey mongoose.
