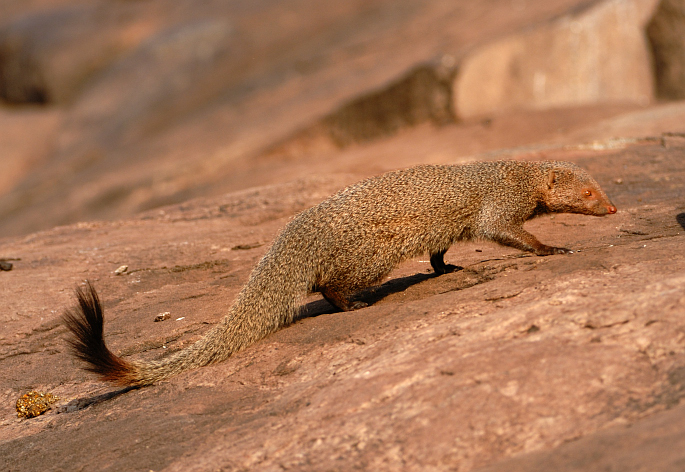

Conservation status
- Least Concern (IUCN 3.1)
- CITES Appendix III

Scientific classification
- Kingdom: Animalia
- Phylum: Chordata
- Class: Mammalia
- Infraclass: Placentalia
- Order: Carnivora
- Suborder: Feliformia
- Family: Herpestidae
- Genus: Urva
- Species: U. smithii

Binomial name
- Urva smithii (Gray, 1837)
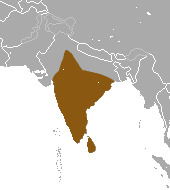
- Ruddy mongoose range

Synonyms
- Herpestes smithii

= Ruddy mongoose =

Species of mongoose from South Asia

The ruddy mongoose (Urva smithii) is a species of mongoose native to the forests of India and Sri Lanka. It is classified as least concern in the IUCN Red List.

== Taxonomy ==
In 1837, British zoologist John Edward Gray proposed the scientific name Herpestes smithii for a zoological specimen in the collection of the British Natural History Museum. Different species names were proposed by various biologists over the years for the ruddy mongooses. In 2009, the Asian mongooses were classified under a new genus, Urva. Three different sub-species have been recognized: smithii, thysanurus, and zeylanius.

== Distribution and habitat ==
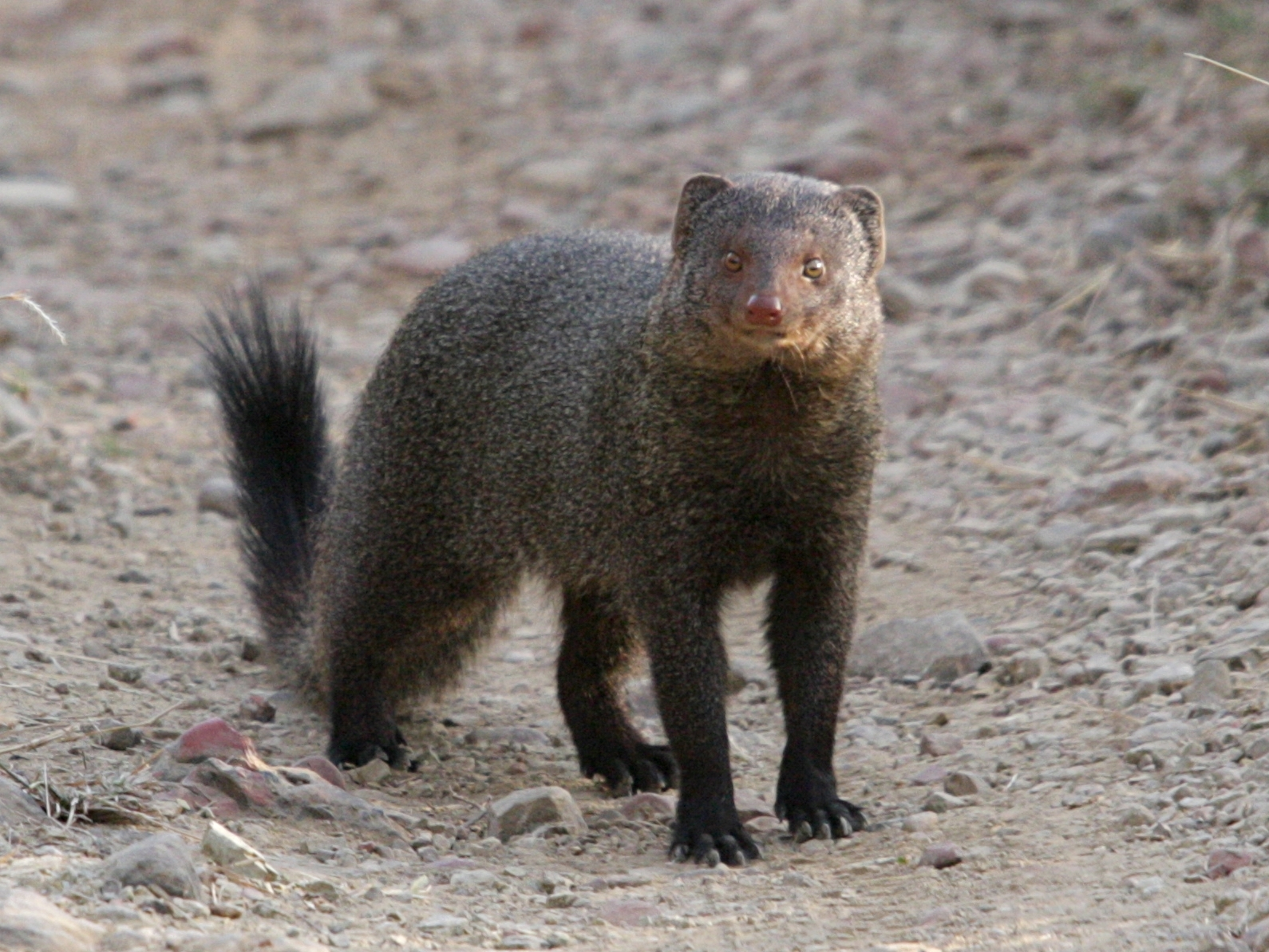
A ruddy mongoose in India

The ruddy mongoose is found in forests and shrub lands in India and Sri Lanka. It is mainly a forest dweller and prefers more secluded areas. It has also been recorded to forage in secluded paddy fields in the region. It is classified as least concern in the IUCN Red List.

== Description ==
The ruddy mongoose is a large mongoose with a greyish-brown fur. It has an average head to body length of 40–45 cm (16–18 in) and a 36 cm (14 in) long tail. The long tail features a darker tasseled tip, which is usually curved upward, and is visible from a distance.

== Ecology and behavior ==
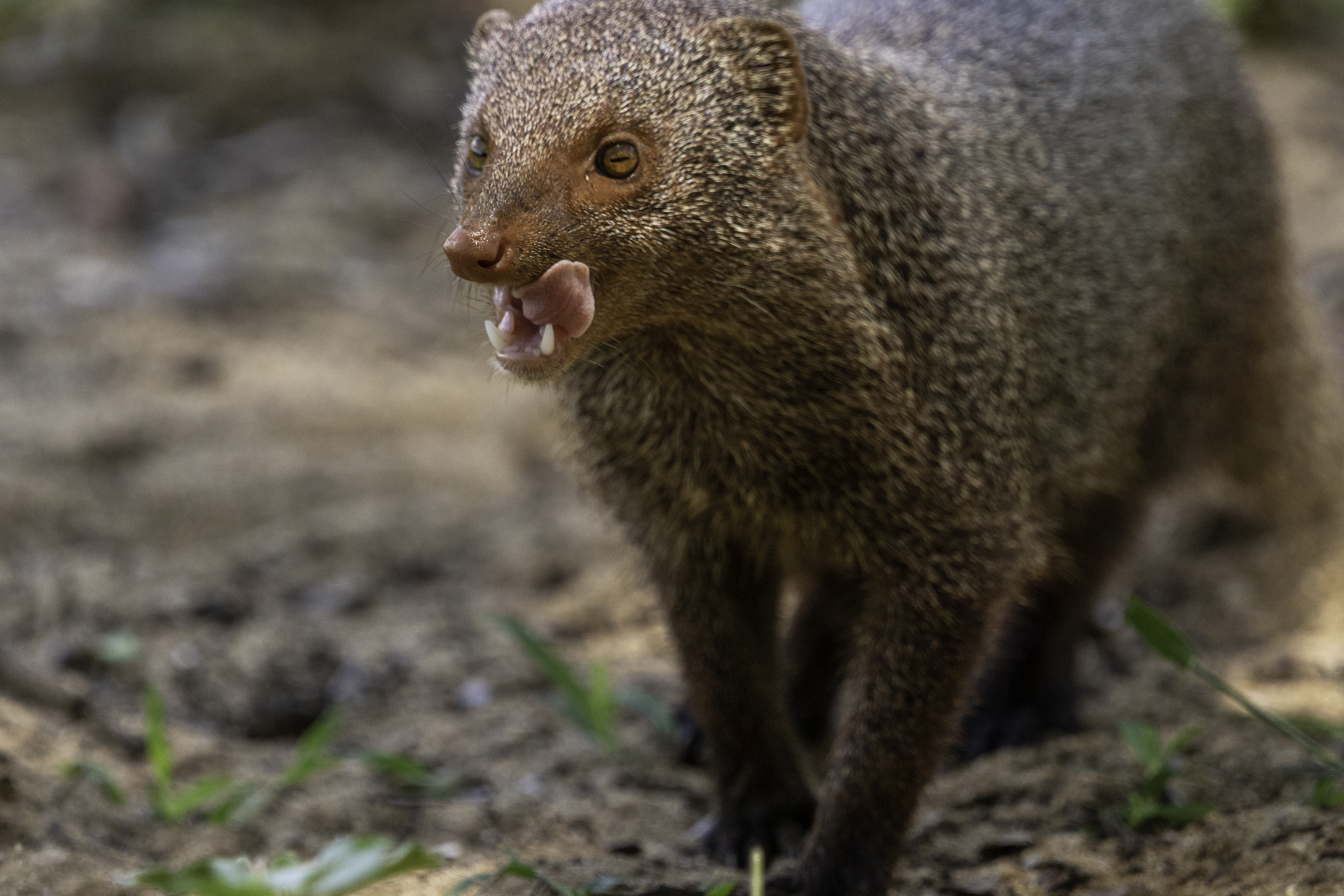
A ruddy mongoose in Sri Lanka

The ruddy mongoose hunts during both day and night, and feeds on birds, rat snakes, land monitors, rodents and snails. It is generally considered a solitary animal, though it has been recorded in monogamous pairs during the mating season. Family groups of up to five animals consisting of a mother and pups have been observed in the wild. While they are generally found in thick jungles, and edges of the forests, they occasionally venture into paddy fields and tea estates. They quickly withdraw into a crevice or underneath a rock shelf on confrontation with humans. When they are cornered, they often show aggressive behaviour while making loud and shrill noises.
