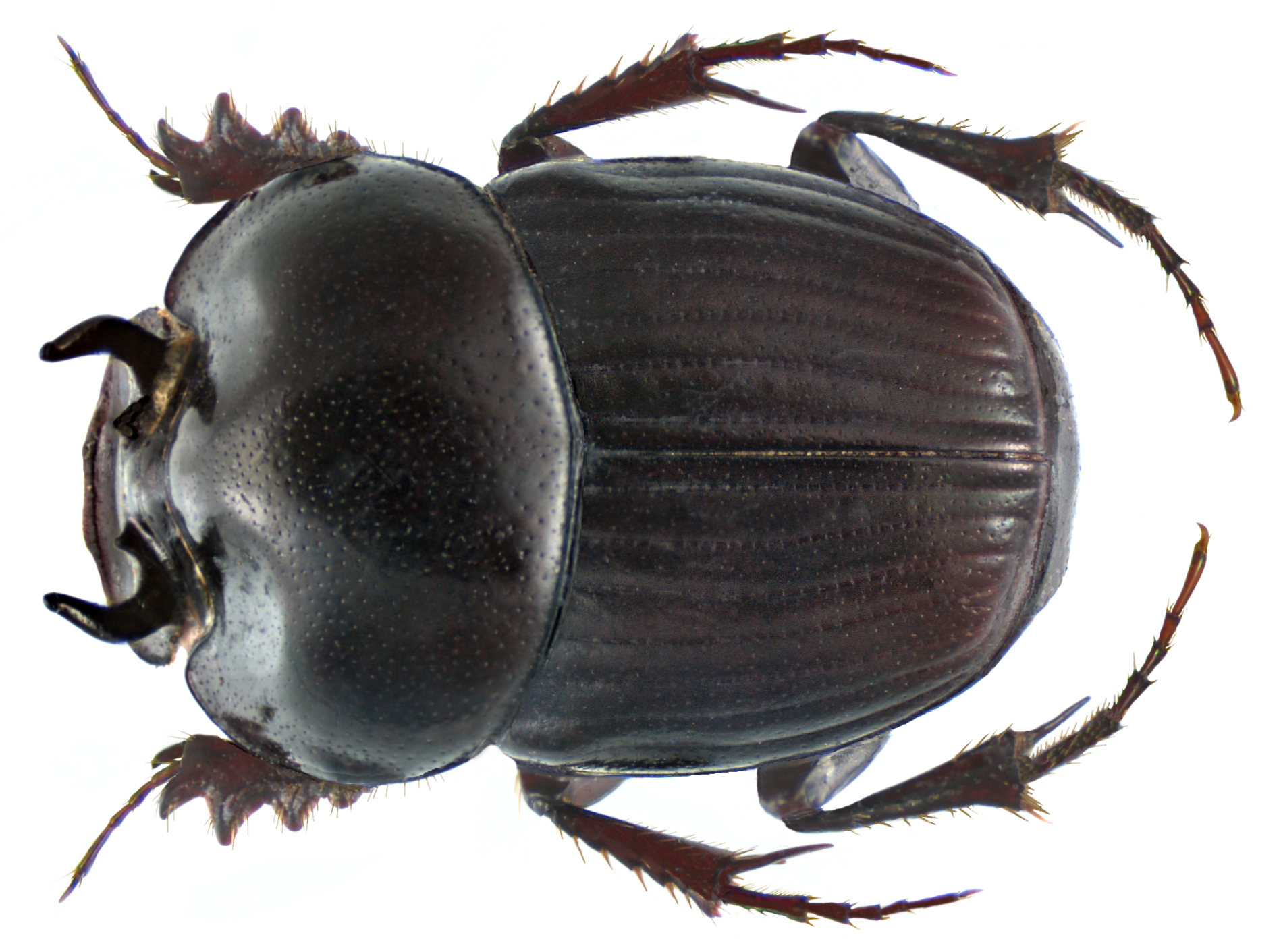
- male

Scientific classification
- Kingdom: Animalia
- Phylum: Arthropoda
- Clade: Pancrustacea
- Class: Insecta
- Order: Coleoptera
- Suborder: Polyphaga
- Infraorder: Scarabaeiformia
- Family: Scarabaeidae
- Genus: Onthophagus
- Species: O. quadridentatus

Binomial name
- Onthophagus quadridentatus (Fabricius, 1798)

Synonyms
- Copris quadricornis Fabricius, 1801; Onthophagus moerens Walker, 1858

= Onthophagus quadridentatus =

Species of beetle

Onthophagus quadridentatus, is a species of dung beetle found in India, Sri Lanka, Pakistan and Taiwan.
