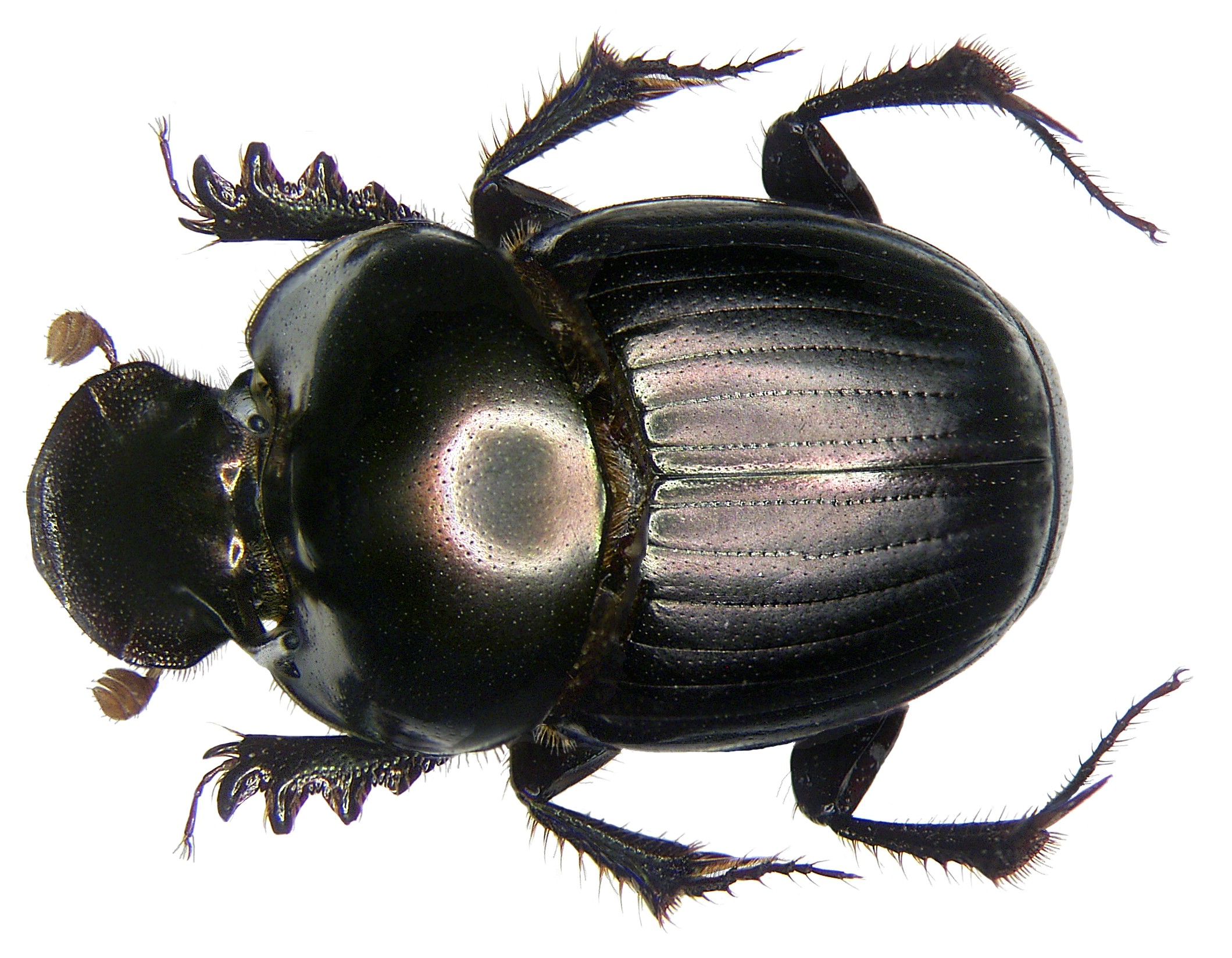

Scientific classification
- Kingdom: Animalia
- Phylum: Arthropoda
- Clade: Pancrustacea
- Class: Insecta
- Order: Coleoptera
- Suborder: Polyphaga
- Infraorder: Scarabaeiformia
- Family: Scarabaeidae
- Genus: Onthophagus
- Species: O. dama

Binomial name
- Onthophagus dama (Fabricius, 1798)

Synonyms
- Copris dama Fabricius 1798; Scarabaeus aeneus Olivier 1789; Onthophagus dama (Fabricius 1798) Arrow 1931; Onthophagus (Onthophagus) dama (Fabricius 1798) Balthasar 1963; Onthophagus cervicornis Kirby, 1825; Onthophagus zubaci Balthasar, 1932

= Onthophagus dama =

Species of beetle

Onthophagus dama is a species of dung beetle found in Nepal, Bhutan, India, and Sri Lanka.

== Description ==
Thie species has an average length of about 8.5 to 11 mm.

== Ecology ==
Adults are coprophagus, and make tunnels in fresh dungs. Frequently seen in cow dung and human feces. They inhabited in tropical dry forest and agricultural habitats.

== Gallery ==
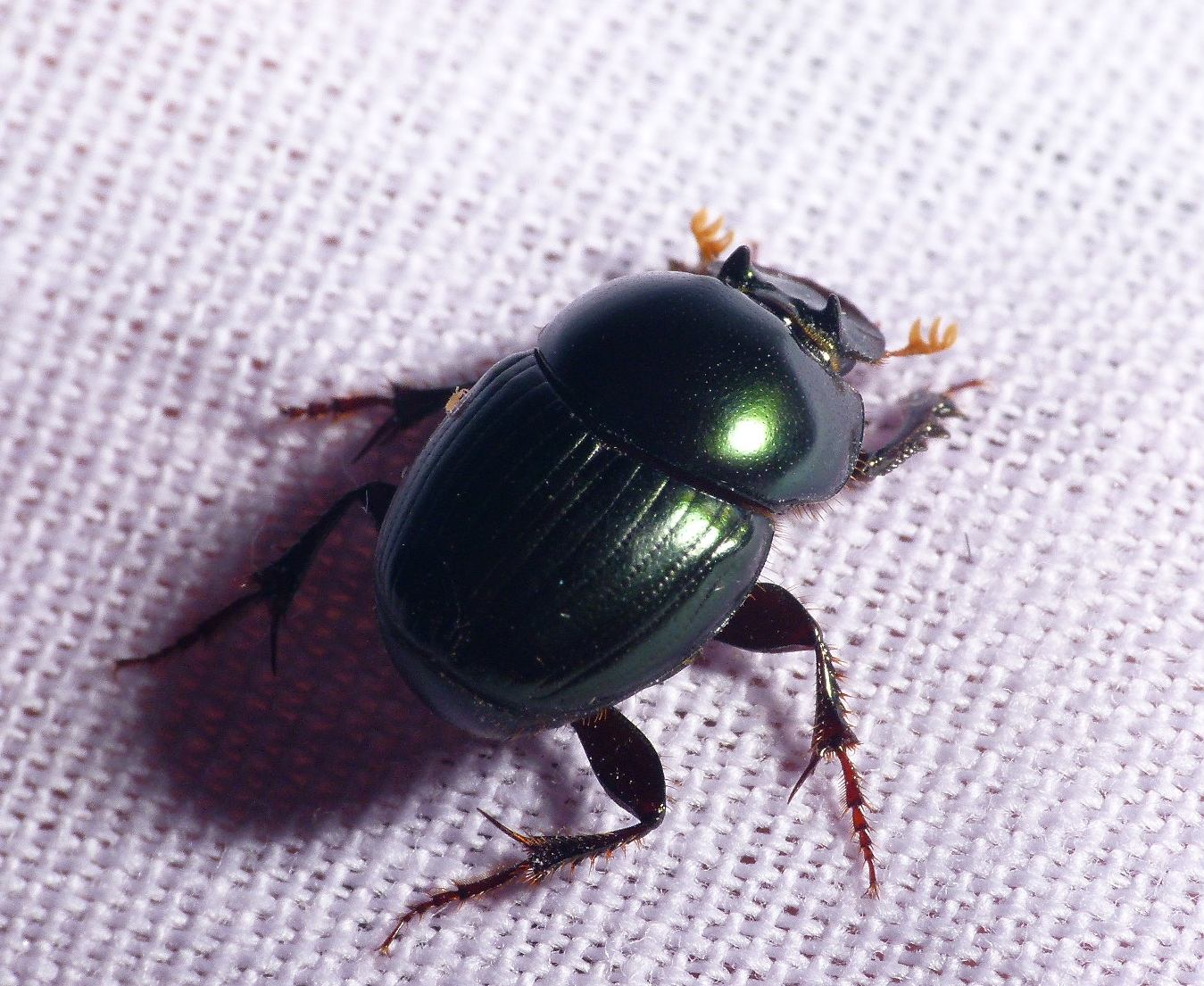

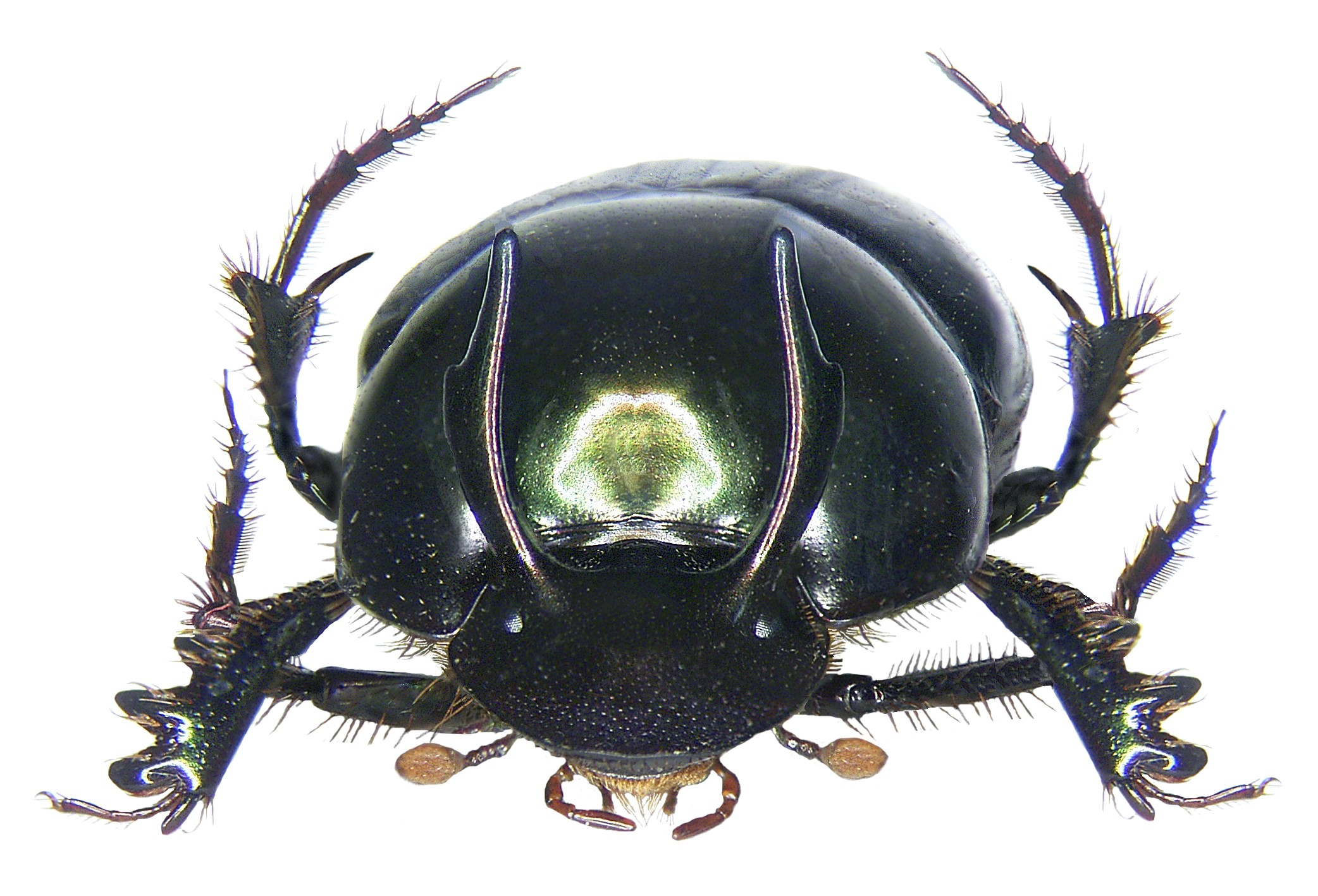
male
