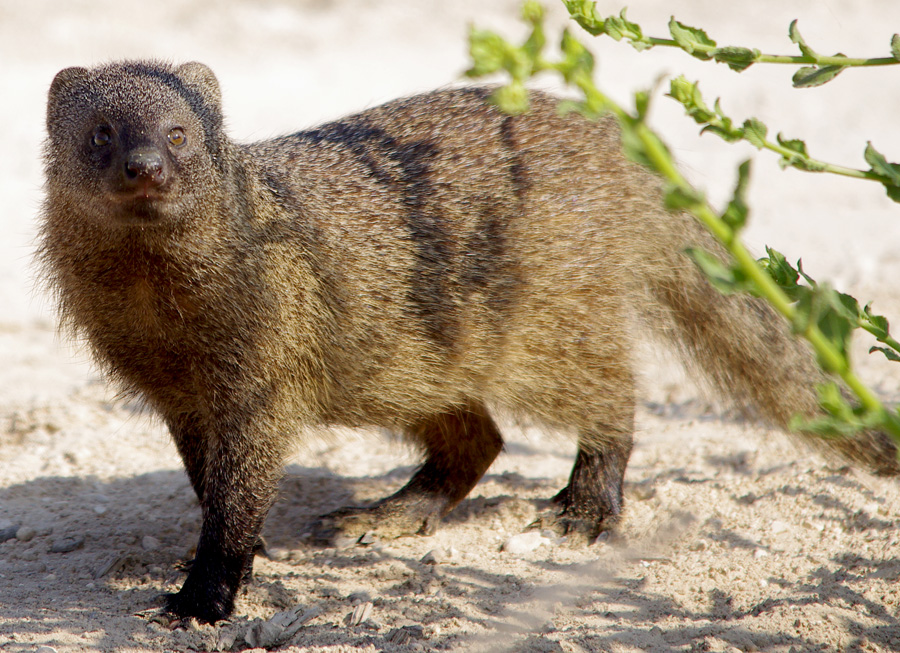
- Egyptian mongoose

Scientific classification
- Kingdom: Animalia
- Phylum: Chordata
- Class: Mammalia
- Order: Carnivora
- Family: Herpestidae
- Subfamily: Herpestinae
- Genus: Herpestes; Illiger, 1811

Type species
- Mustela ichneumon (Linnaeus, 1758)

Species
- see table
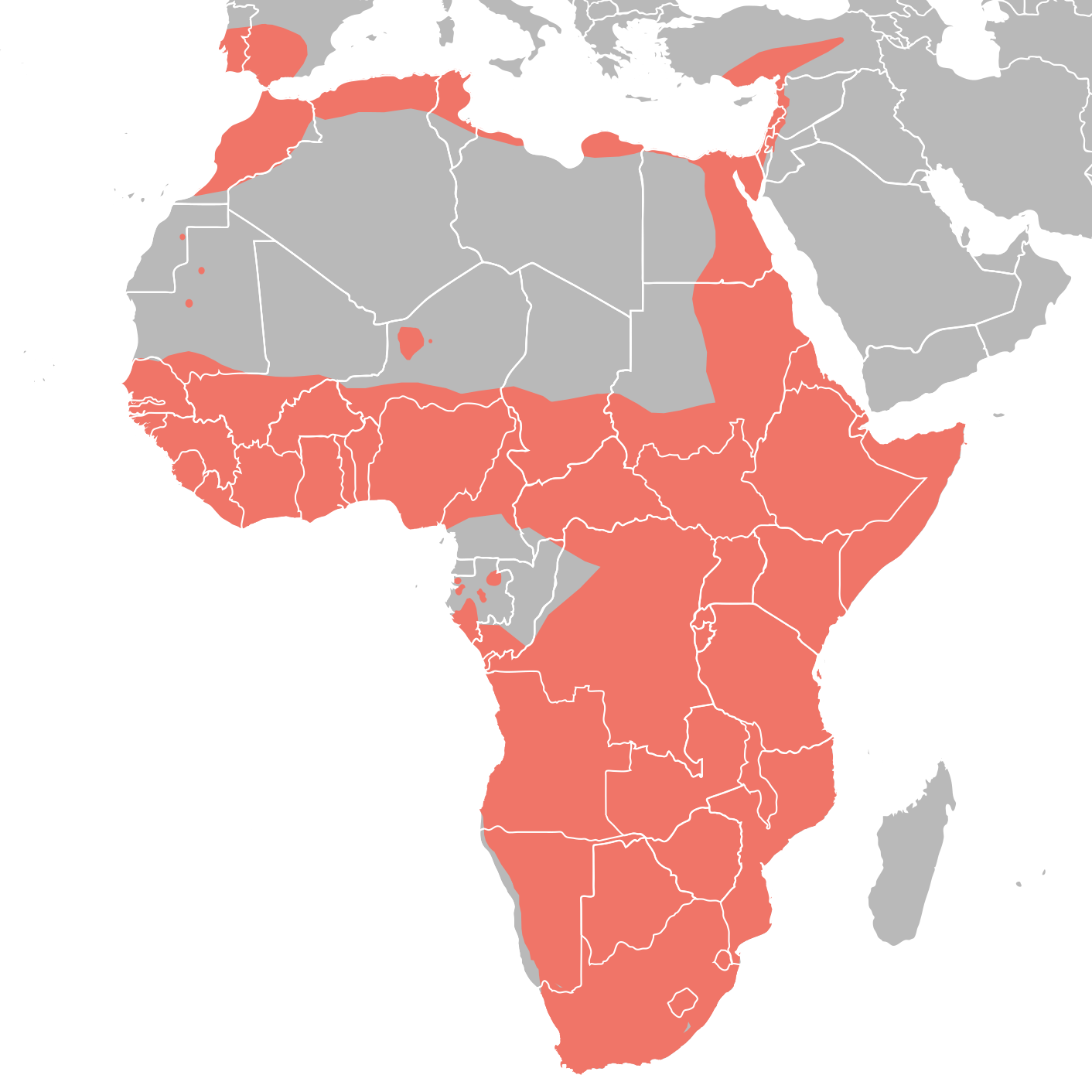
- Herpestes distribution

Synonyms
- Galerella Gray, 1864; Ophiovora

= Herpestes =

Herpestes Temporal range: Oligocene to present

Genus within the mongoose family

Herpestes is a genus within the mongoose family Herpestidae. It is the type genus of the family, and comprises five extant species, each with several subspecies. Several species in the family are known as slender mongooses. Fossil remains of three prehistoric species were excavated in France, and described in 1853.

== Characteristics ==
The living Herpestes species are sexually dimorphic, with females smaller than males. They range in weight from 0.6 to 3.6 kg (1.3 to 7.9 lb). They share several characteristics, including the shape of the cheek teeth and of the tympanic bullae, and the presence of the first upper molar teeth. They are all solitary. Males have one chromosome less than females, as one Y chromosome is translocated to an autosome.

== Classification ==
The scientific name Herpestes was proposed by Johann Karl Wilhelm Illiger in 1811 for mongoose species in the south of the Old World, commonly called "Ichneumon" at the time. Until 1835, 12 mongoose species from Africa and Asia were classified as belonging to the genus Herpestes. In 1864, John Edward Gray listed 22 Herpestes species, which he considered as part of the Viverridae. In 1882, Oldfield Thomas reviewed African mongoose zoological specimens in natural history museums. He subordinated those into the genus Herpestes that have nearly naked soles, four premolars, small last lower molars with two external cusps and whose last upper molars are 40-60% smaller than the last upper premolars. His list comprised eight species in Africa. St. George Jackson Mivart listed 21 Herpestes species, including seven in Africa and 13 in Asia. He also determined Herpestes species by the dentition of mongoose specimens. His criteria included small premolars, small inner cusps of the third upper premolars and transversely extended second upper molars with rather concave posterior margins; their bodies are long with long tails, short legs and five digits to each paw. Wallace Christopher Wozencraft recognised 10 Herpestes species as valid in 2005.

The extinct Herpestes lemanensis was excavated in tertiary depositions in the Loire Valley in central France and described in 1853. It most likely dates to the Late Oligocene.

Phylogenetic analysis of African and Asian mongoose specimens revealed that they belong to three distinct genetic lineages; the two African lineages diverged in the Early Miocene around 19.1 million years ago and 18.5 million years ago, and the Asian Urva lineage at around 17.4 million years ago. The following African mongooses are now placed in the genus Herpestes:

Image	Name	Distribution and IUCN Red List status
	Egyptian mongoose (H. ichneumon) (Linnaeus, 1758)	LC
	Common slender mongoose (H. sanguineus) Rüppell, 1835	LC
	Cape grey mongoose (H. pulverulentus) (Wagner, 1839)	LC
	Somalian slender mongoose (H. ochraceus) Gray, 1848	LC
	Angolan slender mongoose (H. flavescens) (Bocage, 1889)	LC
