= Raccoons as an invasive species =

The common raccoon (Procyon lotor) is a medium sized, omnivorous mammal native to North America which has become an invasive species in multiple regions worldwide, often to the detriment of local biodiversity and agriculture. The raccoon's adaptable nature and high reproductive potential have allowed for successful establishment in many non-native environments including Europe, Japan, and several Caribbean islands. Introductions have been driven by human activities, including the fur trade, pet trade, and accidental releases.

Due to its adaptability, omnivorous diet, high reproductive potential, and ability to thrive in diverse environments, the raccoon is highly successful as an invasive species. One of its key advantages is its ecological flexibility, allowing it to inhabit a wide range of ecosystems, including urban areas. Raccoons have few natural predators in many of their introduced ranges, allowing populations to grow unchecked. Their intelligence and problem-solving skills also facilitate their ability to exploit human-modified environments and increase their survival chances. Female raccoons are capable of producing multiple offspring per year, which accelerates population growth. Climate modeling suggests that their range will continue expanding, particularly in temperate and urbanized regions where they face minimal competition.

== Raccoons by region ==
=== Europe ===
The raccoon was introduced to Europe in the early 20th century, primarily for fur farming and hunting purposes. Subsequent accidental and deliberate releases led to the species' widespread establishment across the continent. The first known introduction occurred in Germany in 1934, when four raccoons were released near Lake Edersee. A second introduction followed in 1945, when 25 individuals escaped from a fur farm in Brandenburg. Since then, raccoon populations have expanded rapidly across central and eastern Europe and are continuing to expand.

Raccoons now have established populations in at least 27 European countries, including France, Spain, Italy, Poland, and the Netherlands. In some cases, populations have expanded from Germany into neighboring countries, while other introductions have occurred through the pet trade. Recent genetic studies indicate that multiple independent introductions, combined with continued escapes and releases from captivity, have contributed to their spread and genetic diversity in Europe.

In Poland, raccoons have been documented preying on hibernating bats in the Nietoperek Reserve, posing a threat to vulnerable bat populations. Similarly, in Spain and France, raccoons have been observed preying on waterfowl and competing with native carnivores for resources. Their presence also poses a threat to agriculture and human activities. Raccoons frequently raid crops, damage property, and exploit urban environments, where they scavenge from garbage bins and human settlements. Additionally, they are known carriers of zoonotic diseases such as rabies and Baylisascaris procyonis, a parasitic roundworm that can infect humans and other animals.

Efforts to control invasive raccoon populations vary across Europe. Some countries, such as Germany and France, allow hunting and trapping of raccoons to limit their numbers, but their high reproductive rates and adaptability make complete eradication difficult. In Italy, targeted eradication programs have been implemented using live traps and camera surveys, with mixed success. Spain has also recognized the growing problem and has called for stronger regulatory measures to prevent further introductions through the pet trade. Despite these efforts, raccoon populations continue to grow, and their management remains a significant challenge. The European Union has classified the raccoon as an Invasive Alien Species of Union Concern under Regulation (EU) 1143/2014, requiring member states to implement measures to prevent further spread. However, the effectiveness of these measures is limited by inconsistent enforcement and public opposition to lethal control methods.

=== Japan ===
The raccoon was introduced to Japan primarily through the pet trade in the 1970s, following the popularity of the animated television series Rascal the Raccoon. Many raccoons were subsequently abandoned or escaped, leading to the establishment of wild populations across the country. The first recorded case of raccoon naturalization in Japan occurred in Inuyama in 1962, but the species spread rapidly after the 1970s, particularly in Hokkaido. Raccoons were initially recorded in limited areas of Hokkaido, but their range has since expanded dramatically. By 2018, raccoons have been detected in 87.2% of Hokkaido's municipalities. Their spread has been attributed factors such as their adaptability to cold climates and lack of natural predators.

Raccoons have been shown to pose a threat to rare and endangered species such as the Ezo salamander (Hynobius retardatus) and Japanese crayfish (Cambaroides japonicus), both of which have experienced increased predation pressure. DNA metabarcoding studies have confirmed that raccoons prey on Ezo salamanders during their spawning season, potentially impacting their population dynamics. Raccoons also compete with native species such as the raccoon dog (Nyctereutes procyonoides), which occupies a similar ecological niche. Like in Europe, raccoons in Japan are also known to damage agricultural crops and urban infrastructure. Similarly, raccoons in Japan have been identified as vectors for zoonotic diseases, including raccoon roundworm (Baylisascaris procyonis), which poses risks to both humans and domestic animals.

In response to the growing ecological and economic threats posed by raccoons, Japan enacted the Invasive Alien Species Act in 2005. This act regulates the capture, transport, and release of raccoons. Local governments have implemented various management strategies, including trapping programs and public awareness campaigns. Despite these efforts, raccoon populations continue to expand in many regions due to limited coordination between local governments and insufficient funding for large-scale control programs. Some municipalities have had success by adopting intensive trapping campaigns in early invasion stages, but long-term population suppression remains challenging.

=== The Caribbean ===
Raccoons were introduced to various locations in the Caribbean, including The Bahamas, Guadeloupe, Saint Martin, Martinique, Isla Catalina primarily through human activities such as the pet trade and unintentional releases. Historical records indicate that raccoons were first documented in the West Indies in the 17th century (Exception with the Isla Catalina, they were introduced in the 1950s by Ramfis Trujillo). Initially, these raccoons were considered to be either their own species, or a subspecies of the common raccoon. Raccoons in the Bahamas and Guadeloupe were considered endemic species, with distinct names such as Procyon maynardi (Bahamas) and Procyon minor (Guadeloupe). However, genetic and morphological analyses confirm that all island raccoon populations originate from various subspecies found in the United States,Tres Marias Raccoon and the critically endangered Cozumel raccoon being the only exceptions.

Introducing a predatory species like raccoons with no natural predators to insular ecosystems is particularly damaging. Raccoons pose threats to native birds and sea turtles by raiding nests and consuming eggs, and their presence has been found to contribute to the decline of native rodent species. In Guadeloupe and Martinique, studies using camera traps indicate that raccoons are widely distributed and have few natural predators or competitors, allowing them to thrive and disrupt native ecosystems. In the Bahamas, one single raccoon wiped out almost 69% of the endangered Sandy Cay rock iguana (Cyclura rileyi cristata) population.

== Future spread ==
Environmental niche modeling predicts that by 2050, suitable habitats for raccoons will expand significantly. Areas of particular concern are northern and temperate regions, while some tropical areas may become less favorable. Current models indicate that raccoons are likely to continue spreading across Europe, Central Asia, and East Asia, as well as into new regions such as parts of the Middle East, including Iran, where habitat suitability is increasing.

== See also ==
- Bahamian raccoon
- Guadeloupe raccoon
- Island raccoon
