= List of procyonids =

Species in mammal family Procyonidae

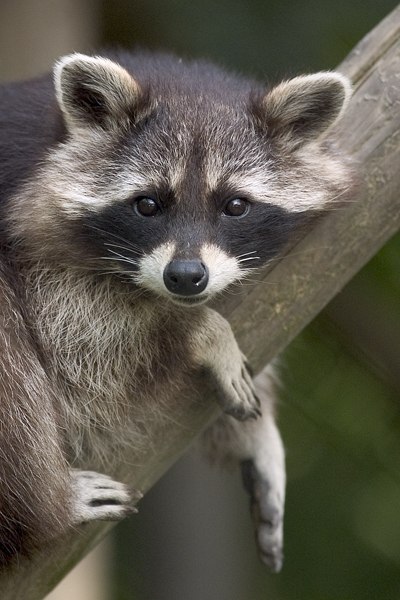
Common racoon (Procyon lotor)

Procyonidae is a family of mammals in the order Carnivora, which includes raccoons, coatis, olingos, kinkajous, ringtails, and cacomistles, and many other extant and extinct mammals. A member of this family is called a procyonid. They are native to North and South America, though the common raccoon has been introduced to Europe, western Asia, and Japan. Procyonid habitats are generally forests, though some are found in shrublands and grasslands as well. The ringtail has a varied range including rocky areas and deserts as well as forests, and the common raccoon is widespread in urban environments. Species range in size from around 30–65 cm (12–26 in) long, plus a tail generally as long again. Population sizes are largely unknown, though the Cozumel raccoon is critically endangered, with around 200 individuals left, and the Eastern mountain coati is endangered. No procyonid species have been domesticated, although raccoons are sometimes kept as pets.

The fourteen species of Procyonidae are split into six genera, which are not currently grouped into named clades. Procyonidae is believed to have diverged as a separate family within Carnivora around 22.6 million years ago. In addition to the extant species, Procyonidae includes doxens of extinct species placed in the six extant and nineteen extinct genera, though due to ongoing research and discoveries the exact number and categorization is not fixed.

== Conventions ==
IUCN Red List categories
Conservation status
- EX: Extinct (0 species)
- EW: Extinct in the wild (0 species)
- CR: Critically endangered (1 species)
- EN: Endangered (1 species)
- VU: Vulnerable (0 species)
- NT: Near threatened (2 species)
- LC: Least concern (10 species)

The author citation for the species or genus is given after the scientific name; parentheses around the author citation indicate that this was not the original taxonomic placement. Conservation status codes listed follow the International Union for Conservation of Nature (IUCN) Red List of Threatened Species. Range maps are provided wherever possible; if a range map is not available, a description of the procyonid's range is provided. Ranges are based on the IUCN Red List for that species unless otherwise noted. All extinct species or subspecies listed alongside extant species went extinct after 1500 CE, and are indicated by a dagger symbol (†). Population figures are rounded to the nearest hundred.

== Classification ==
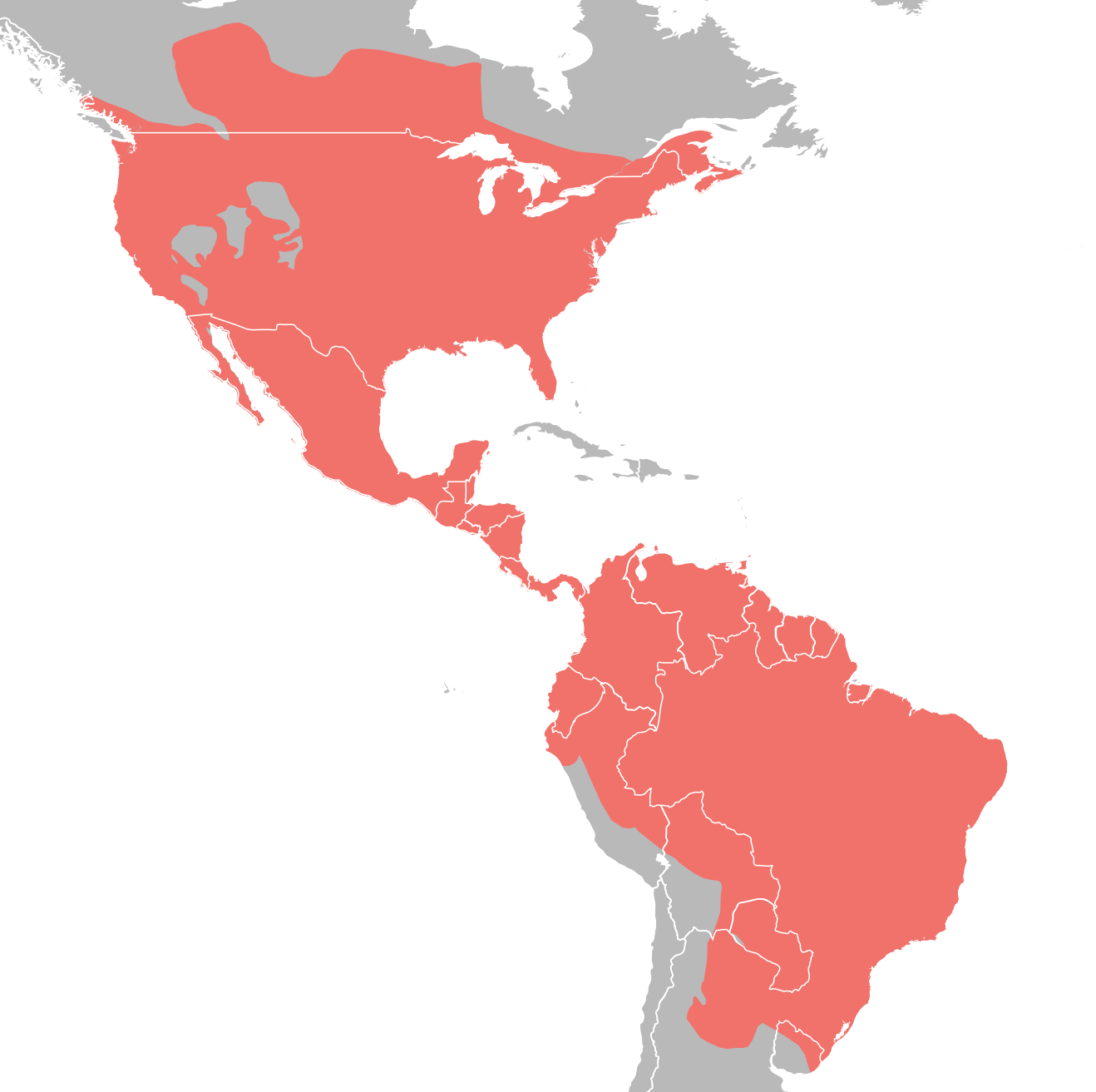
Procyonidae distribution

The family Procyonidae consists of fourteen extant species belonging to six genera and divided into dozens of subspecies. This does not include hybrid species or extinct prehistoric species. Some prior classification schemes included the red panda or divided the family into named subfamilies and tribes based on similarities in morphology, though modern molecular studies indicate instead that the kinkajou is basal to the family, while raccoons, cacomistles, and ringtails form one clade and coatis and olingos another, despite morphology suggesting otherwise.

- Genus Bassaricyon (olingos): four species
- Genus Bassariscus (ringtails and cacomistles): two species
- Genus Nasua (coatis): two species
- Genus Nasuella (mountain coatis): two species
- Genus Potos (kinkajous): one species
- Genus Procyon (raccoons): three species

- Procyonidae
  - - - Bassaricyon
      - - Nasua
        - Nasuella
    - - Procyon
      - Bassariscus
  - Potos

== Procyonids ==
The following classification is based on the taxonomy described by Mammal Species of the World (2005), with augmentation by generally accepted proposals made since using molecular phylogenetic analysis; this includes rearranging Bassaricyon from five species to a mostly different four, and promoting the eastern mountain coati from a subspecies of the mountain coati. There are additional proposals which are disputed, such as promoting the Guadeloupe raccoon population of the Bahamian raccoon subspecies of raccoon to a separate subspecies, which are not included here.

Genus Bassaricyon – Allen, 1876 – four species
Common name	Scientific name and subspecies	Range	Size and ecology	IUCN status and estimated population
Eastern lowland olingo	B. alleni Thomas, 1880	Northwest South America	Size: 30–46 cm (12–18 in) long, plus 40–53 cm (16–21 in) tail Habitat: Forest Diet: Primarily eats fruit, as well as small rodents, lizards, birds, insects, and eggs	LC Unknown
Northern olingo	B. gabbii Allen, 1876	Central America	Size: 38–45 cm (15–18 in) long, plus 40–53 cm (16–21 in) tail Habitat: Forest Diet: Primarily eats fruit, nectar, flowers, insects, and small vertebrates	LC Unknown
Olinguito	B. neblina Helgen, 2013 Four subspecies: B. n. hershkovitzi; B. n. neblina; B. n. osborni; B. n. ruber	Andes mountains in northwest South America	Size: 32–40 cm (13–16 in) long, plus 33–43 cm (13–17 in) tail Habitat: Forest Diet: Primarily eats fruit	NT Unknown
Western lowland olingo	B. medius Thomas, 1909 Two subspecies: B. m. medius; B. m. orinomus	Northwest South America and eastern Central America	Size: 33–39 cm (13–15 in) long, plus 35–52 cm (14–20 in) tail Habitat: Forest Diet: Primarily eats fruit and nectar	LC Unknown

Genus Bassariscus – Coues, 1887 – two species
Common name	Scientific name and subspecies	Range	Size and ecology	IUCN status and estimated population
Cacomistle	B. sumichrasti (Saussure, 1860) Five subspecies: B. s. latrans; B. s. notinus; B. s. oaxacensis; B. s. sumichrasti; B. s. variabilis	Southern Mexico and Central America	Size: 38–47 cm (15–19 in) long, plus 39–53 cm (15–21 in) tail Habitat: Forest Diet: Primarily eats fruit, insects, and small vertebrates	LC Unknown
Ringtail	B. astutus (Lichtenstein, 1830) Fourteen subspecies: B. a. arizonensis; B. a. astutus; B. a. bolei; B. a. consitus; B. a. flavus; B. a. insulicola; B. a. macdougalli; B. a. nevadensis; B. a. octavus; B. a. palmarius; B. a. raptor; B. a. saxicola; B. a. willetti; B. a. yumanensis	Mexico and southwestern United States	Size: 30–42 cm (12–17 in) long, plus 31–45 cm (12–18 in) tail Habitat: Shrubland, forest, rocky areas, desert, and grassland Diet: Primarily eats rodents, insects, birds, and fruit	LC Unknown

Genus Nasua – Storr, 1780 – two species
Common name	Scientific name and subspecies	Range	Size and ecology	IUCN status and estimated population
South American coati	N. nasua (Linnaeus, 1766) Thirteen subspecies: N. n. aricana; N. n. boliviensis; N. n. candace; N. n. cinerascens; N. n. dorsalis; N. n. manium; N. n. molaris; N. n. montana; N. n. nasua; N. n. quichua; N. n. solitaria; N. n. spadicea; N. n. vittata	Northern and central South America	Size: 41–67 cm (16–26 in) long, plus 32–69 cm (13–27 in) tail Habitat: Forest and shrubland Diet: Primarily eats invertebrates and fruit	LC Unknown
White-nosed coati	N. narica (Linnaeus, 1766) Four subspecies: N. n. molaris; N. n. narica; N. n. nelsoni (Cozumel Island coati); N. n. yucatanica	Southern North America, Central America, and northwest South America	Size: 33–67 cm (13–26 in) long, plus 33–67 cm (13–26 in) tail Habitat: Grassland and forest Diet: Primarily eats fruit and invertebrates	LC Unknown

Genus Nasuella – Hollister, 1915 – two species
Common name	Scientific name and subspecies	Range	Size and ecology	IUCN status and estimated population
Eastern mountain coati	N. meridensis Thomas, 1901	Andes mountains in Venezuela	Size: 43–54 cm (17–21 in) long, plus 19–30 cm (7–12 in) tail Habitat: Forest and grassland Diet: Unknown	EN Unknown
Western mountain coati	N. olivacea (Gray, 1865) Two subspecies: N. o. olivacea; N. o. quitensis	Andes mountains in northern South America	Size: 36–39 cm (14–15 in) long, plus 20–24 cm (8–9 in) tail Habitat: Forest and grassland Diet: Primarily eats invertebrates, small vertebrates, fruit, and vegetable remains	NT Unknown

Genus Potos – Geoffroy Saint-Hilaire & G. Cuvier, 1795 – one species
Common name	Scientific name and subspecies	Range	Size and ecology	IUCN status and estimated population
Kinkajou	P. flavus (Schreber, 1774) Seven subspecies: P. f. chapadensis; P. f. chiriquensis; P. f. flavus; P. f. megalotus; P. f. meridensis; P. f. modestus; P. f. nocturnus	Central America and northern South America	Size: 40–60 cm (16–24 in) long, plus 40–60 cm (16–24 in) tail Habitat: Forest Diet: Primarily eats fruit, as well as flowers and leaves	LC Unknown

Genus Procyon – Storr, 1780 – three species
Common name	Scientific name and subspecies	Range	Size and ecology	IUCN status and estimated population
Cozumel raccoon	P. pygmaeus Merriam, 1901	Cozumel island in Mexico	Size: 42–60 cm (17–24 in) long, plus 23–26 cm (9–10 in) tail Habitat: Forest Diet: Primarily eats crabs, as well as fruit, insects, crayfish, and small vertebrates	CR 200
Crab-eating raccoon	P. cancrivorus (G. Cuvier, 1798) Four subspecies: P. c. aequatorialis; P. c. cancrivorus; P. c. nigripes; P. c. panamensis	South America	Size: 54–65 cm (21–26 in) long, plus 25–38 cm (10–15 in) tail Habitat: Forest and inland wetlands Diet: Primarily eats molluscs, fish, crabs, insects, and amphibians	LC Unknown
Raccoon	P. lotor (Linnaeus, 1758) 22 subspecies: P. l. auspicatus (Key Vaca raccoon); P. l. elucus (Florida raccoon); P. l. excelsus (Snake River Valley raccoon); P. l. fuscipes (Texas raccoon); P. l. gloveralleni (Barbados raccoon)†; P. l. grinnelli (Baja California raccoon); P. l. hernandezii (Mexican plateau raccoon); P. l. hirtus (Upper Mississippi Valley raccoon); P. l. incautus (Torch Key raccoon); P. l. inesperatus (Matecumbe Key raccoon); P. l. insularis (Tres Marias raccoon); P. l. litoreus (Saint Simon Island raccoon); P. l. lotor (Eastern raccoon); P. l. marinus (Ten Thousand Islands raccoon); P. l. maynardi (Bahamian raccoon); P. l. megalodous (Mississippi Delta raccoon); P. l. pacificus (Pacific Northwest raccoon); P. l. pallidus (Colorado Desert raccoon); P. l. psora (California raccoon); P. l. pumilus (Isthmian raccoon); P. l. simus (Short-faced raccoon)†; P. l. vancouverensis (Vancouver Island raccoon)	North and Central America, and introduced to Central Europe, the Caucasus Mountains, and Japan	Size: 41–55 cm (16–22 in) long, plus 19–41 cm (7–16 in) tail Habitat: Forest Diet: Omnivorous, eats fruit, nuts, insects, small mammals, eggs, birds, frogs, fish, aquatic invertebrates, worms, and garbage	LC Unknown
