= Mesocarnivore =

Organism that eats mostly animal tissue

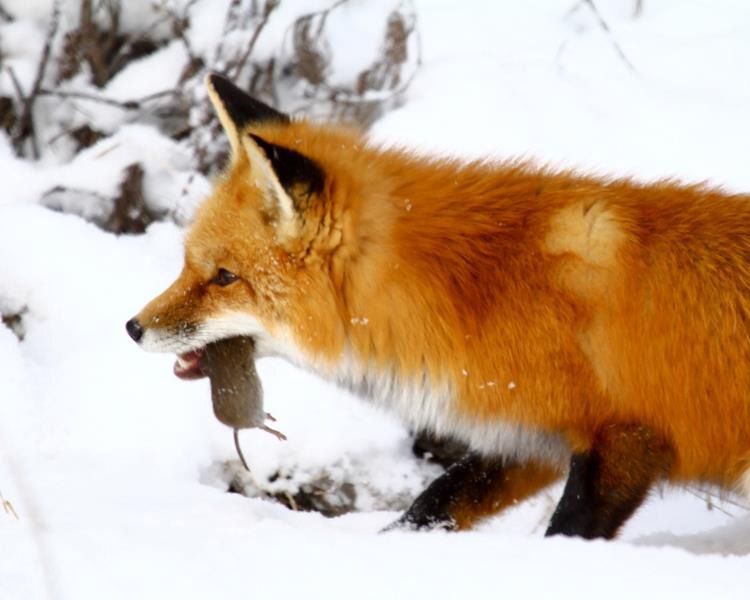
A red fox (Vulpes vulpes) has caught a rodent—an example of a mesocarnivore

A mesocarnivore is an animal whose diet consists of 30–70% meat with the balance consisting of non-vertebrate foods which may include insects, fungi, fruits, other plant material and any food that is available to them. Mesocarnivores are from a large family group of mammalian carnivores and vary from small to medium sized, which are often less than fifteen kilograms, the human is a notable exception. Mesocarnivores are seen today among the Canidae (coyotes, foxes), Viverridae (civets), Mustelidae (martens, tayra), Procyonidae (ringtail, raccoon), Mephitidae (skunks), and Herpestidae (some mongooses). The red fox is also the most common of the mesocarnivores in Europe and has a high population density in the areas they reside.

In North America, some mesocarnivores are in danger of being over hunted for their pelts. This has led to efforts to help protect and conserve the mesocarnivores in the area which have been largely successful thus far. These animals play an essential role in the function and system of the ecosystem, since the elimination of apex predators.

== Evolution ==
Mesocarnivores, as a part of the mammalian carnivore family, play a large role in the ecosystem, due to their prey-drive effects and impact on its functionality and structure. They are an important part of the ecological function, as their small to medium size allows them to disperse seeds that hypercarnivores cannot. Mesocarnivores transport seeds in open spaces, as far as one kilometre and disperse seeds within 600 to 750 metres of each other. They can influence other native carnivores by predation and competition in the ecosystem, and can lead to a reduction or possible extinction of prey species and affect geographical distribution, changing the structure of the ecosystem. Mesocarnivores also serve other ecological roles such as their position in the food web and disease mitigation. Mesocarnivores' habitats are rapidly changing due to urbanisation, habitat fragmentation and deforestation, which is a threat to survival for these animals, due to habitat loss and can cause a decrease in species. Some mesocarnivores have adapted very quickly to the constantly changing habitat conditions, compared to other mesocarnivores, for example the coyote (Canis latrans) in Northeast North America. Many carnivores have different locomotor movements and can easily adapt to a range of habitats and source various foods.

== Characteristics ==
=== Behaviour and activity ===
In some mesocarnivores, including the masked palm civet and hog badger, activity patterns peak during the night. Mesocarnivores activity levels change within different seasons and climates. Different temperatures and the rate of plant growth may affect the activity patterns in mesocarnivores. Masked palm civets in China do not appear often in the winter months (December to February) and are not as active. Mesocarnivores' behaviour and characteristics are individual to their species. For example, coyotes are pack animals and form strong family relations. The way mesocarnivores communicate with each other is through their behaviours that are able to organise mating systems, distinguish parental care and other behaviours. Carnivores also use their senses to communicate with other animals and in the pack, especially their olfactory senses.

Mesocarnivores perform a wide range of different movements. Different species of mesocarnivores can achieve different types of locomotor movements. For example, otters (Lutrinae) are specialised in swimming in water, however find it difficult to move on land. Other carnivores can improve their locomotor movements by behaviour modifications, for example, the red wolf demonstrate group hunting behaviour where it allows them to run and hunt prey as a pack, that can not be done individually. Carnivores with limbs that are adapted for running may run, gallop or pace to go at a fast pace and cover long distances. These carnivorous mammals use their gait which is dependent on their species and size. The structure of a carnivore is designed to catch prey and kill it.

Mesocarnivores may have less widespread geographic ranges relative to hypercarnivores, as they do depend to an extent on vegetation for subsistence and may be constrained to regions with a particular flora. During the Middle and Late Miocene, hypercarnivorous carnivorans had larger geographic ranges than mesocarnivorous carnivorans.

=== Feeding behaviours ===
Mesocarnivores are found to be nocturnal and are hunting for prey when they are most active during the nighttime. Mesocarnivores' feeding behaviours mainly consist of prey availability. They feed on small mammals which include a range of different mice and squirrels, such as the northern grasshopper mice, ord's kangaroo rat and thirteen-lined ground squirrels. Some other examples of mesocarnivores' prey are the blacktailed jackrabbit and the desert cottontail. Large and small mammals are considered as prey to these mesocarnivores, as well as different herbivores, depending on what food is most readily available to these animals. Without apex predators, there is a decreased level of inter-specific competition in the food chain between mesocarnivores, allowing them to increase their scavenging options for different food. As mesocarnivores are scavengers, they will eat any food that is accessible to them. For example, the yellow-throated marten and Siberian weasel change their feeding behaviours in winter when limited fruits are available and convert to small mammal prey. Mesocarnivores are closely related to other mammals in regards to competition and intraguild predation. Interspecific competition is a vital part of the ecological species and community structure, as a result can lead to "exploitation competition" and "interference competition" with other species.

=== Dentition ===
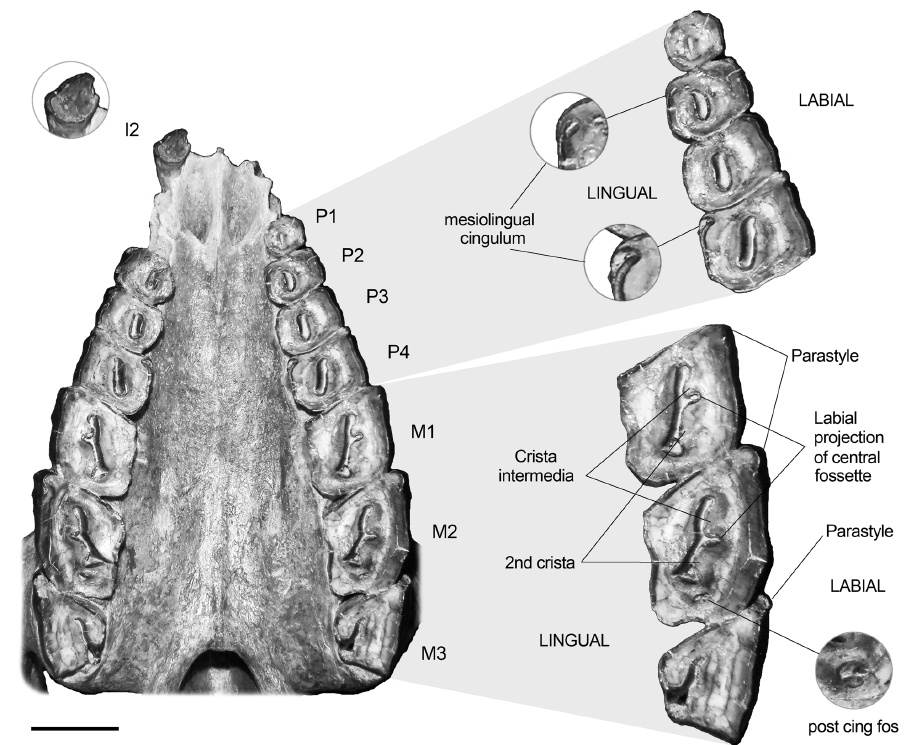
Dentition

Mesocarnivore cheek teeth are heterodont and their different shapes reflect distinct functions. Incisors and canines are used to apprehend food and kill prey, pointed premolars pierce and hold prey, and molars are involved in both slicing and crushing functions. The slicing function of the molars is produced by occlusion between the carnassials, the lower first molar, and the upper fourth premolar.

Mesocarnivores are first represented by the Miacidae. They are best represented by Prohesperocyon, with three incisors, one canine tooth, four premolars above. The jaw has three molars below, and two molars above on each side.

== Taxonomy ==
There are many animals in the wild that are considered as mesocarnivores, such as species of lynx, bobcat, American marten, fisher, river otter, American mink, coyote, red fox, gray fox, raccoon, striped skunk, weasels. Individual species' diets may vary, depending on the season and what food can be sourced. Mesocarnivore mammals have a large role in the ecosystem that impacts ecological community and system in the environment.

=== Example species ===
==== Coyote (Canis latrans) ====
The coyote (Canis latrans) is a native species to North America. They can live up to a lifespan of fourteen years, with their size ranging from 81–94 cm (32 to 37 inch) head to body, and weigh 9–23 kg (20–50 pounds). Coyotes' diet mostly consists of mammals, fruits, birds, grass and insects. They are also hunters and will eat anything of readily available prey including rabbits, fish, lamb. The coyotes in the wild enjoy intense smells of adventure and prey, as well as having an excellent sense of vision. They are pack animals and hunt prey and food in a pack, especially in the fall and winter.

==== River otter (Lontra canadensis) ====
The river otter is one of North America's native animals. They have an average lifespan of 8 to 9 years, with a body length ranging from 56–80 cm (22–32 inch) head to body and weigh 5–13 kg (11–30 pounds). The river otter's habitat is in water and on land. They create a burrow near the water as their den and easily adapt to other aquatic habitats. They hunt during the night, and find food that is readily available to them. River otters have great swimming abilities and stay active during winter.

==== Raccoon (Procyon lotor) ====
There are several raccoon species which are also known as ringtail, all originated from the United States. Their physical characteristics include short limbs, a pointed snout and small upright ears, with a body length of 75–90 cm (30–35 inch) long. Raccoons weight varies from 10–20 kg (22–44 pounds) and have a furry coat that resembles black, grey and brown shades. These mesocarnivores catch majority of their food in water, including crayfish, frogs and other marine animals, as well as feeding on rodents and other plant material. Some species of the raccoon include the Barbados raccoon (P. gloveralleni), Tres Marías raccoon (P. insularis), Bahaman raccoon (P. maynardi), Guadeloupe raccoon (P. minor) and Cozumel raccoon (P. pygmaeus).

==== Mongoose (Herpestidae) ====
The mongoose is a species of mesocarnivores which are mainly located in Africa, southern Asia and southern Europe. They are known for their predatory attacks on snakes. The meerkat is known as a part of the mongoose family of mesocarnivores. Mongooses are animals with physical features including short legs, pointed snout, minute ears and a long tail. Their fur colour resembles grey to brown shades and have specks of lighter grey. The mongoose ranges in size from the smallest, dwarf mongoose, 17–24 cm (7–10 inch) in body length and the largest mongoose of 48–74 cm (19–29 inch) in body length. Dwarf mongoose have a tail approximately 15–20 cm (6–8 inch) long, and larger mongooses have a longer tail up to 40 cm (19 inch) long.

==== Red fox (Vulpes vulpes) ====
The red fox is a species part of the fox family, which is located in Europe, Asia, Africa and North America. Its body length is usually approximately 90–105 cm (35–41 inch) long, 30–40 cm (12–16 inch) of its body length being its tail, and is a height of 40 cm (16 inch). Many adult red foxes weigh 5–7 kg (11–15 pounds) and can reach up to 14 kg (31 pounds). The physical characteristics of the red fox have a soft thin undercoat and long hairs that consists of orange, red, brown shades. The red fox has black ears and legs, with white on the tip of its tail and on its chest. Red foxes live in a range of habitats which include grasslands, forests, mountains and deserts.

==== Striped skunk (Mephitis mephitis) ====
The striped skunk is a mesocarnivore species that are located in the United States. Their physical characteristics in size range from 20–25 cm (8–10 inch) from head to body, with a 12–38 cm (5–15 inch) tail. Striped skunks weigh between 200g–6 kg (7 ounces–14 pounds) and have an average lifespan of 3 years. They are easily adaptable animals that live in forests, woodlands and grasslands. These mesocarnivores can be easily recognized by their black fur with a thin white stripe from their nose to their forehead. There are two thick white stripes that run along the sides of their back and continue to their furry, bushy tail with grey shades. Striped skunks are known for their predatory skunk spray, where oily liquid is released by its glands, resulting in a foul odor to their predators.

==== Marten (Martes spp.) ====
The marten is a mesocarnivore species which are found in Canada, United States, Africa, Asia and Europe. There are many different species of the marten. Their physical characteristics include a variation in size and colour from yellow to shades of dark brown, short legs, small, round ears and slender bodies, with thick coats. Their body length ranges from 35–65 cm (14–26 inch), with a long tail of 3–7 cm (9–18 inch), depending on the species and weigh 1–2kg (2–4 pounds). Some species of the marten include American marten, pine marten, stone marten, yellow-throated marten, and nilgiri marten.

Species of Mesocarnivores

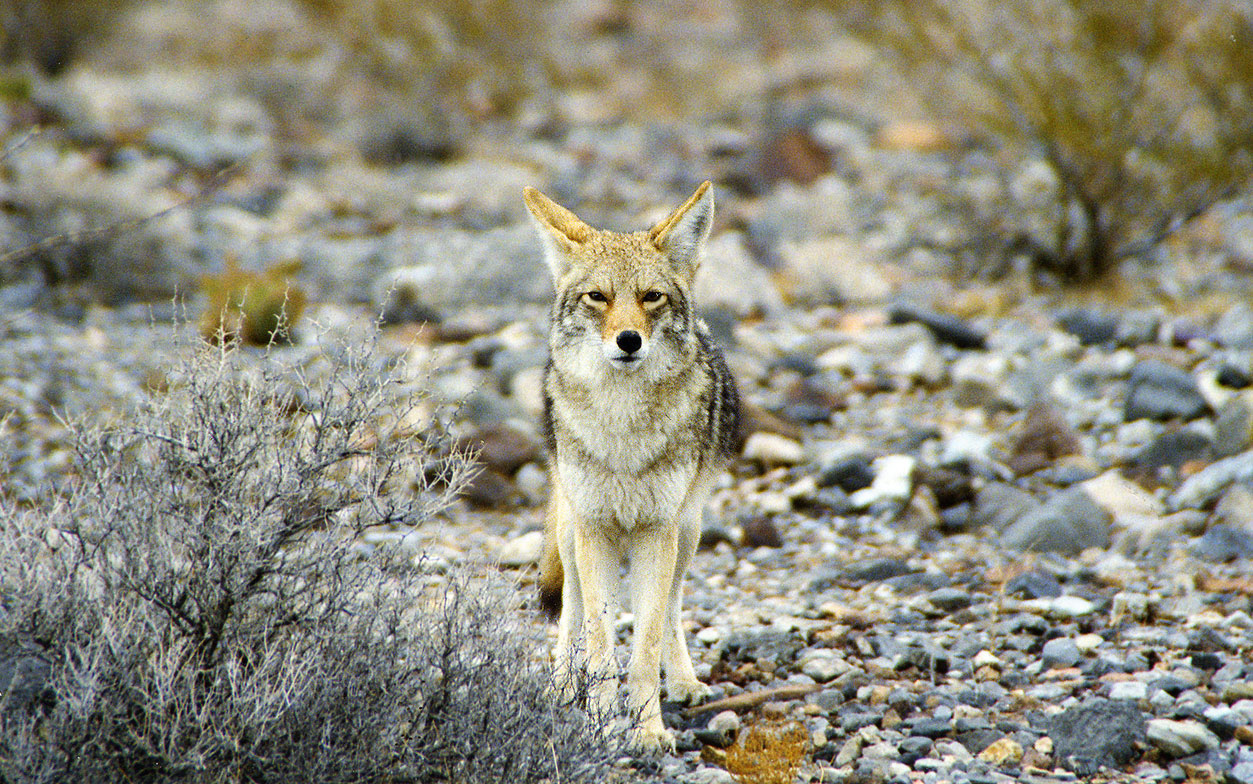
Coyote (Canis latrans)

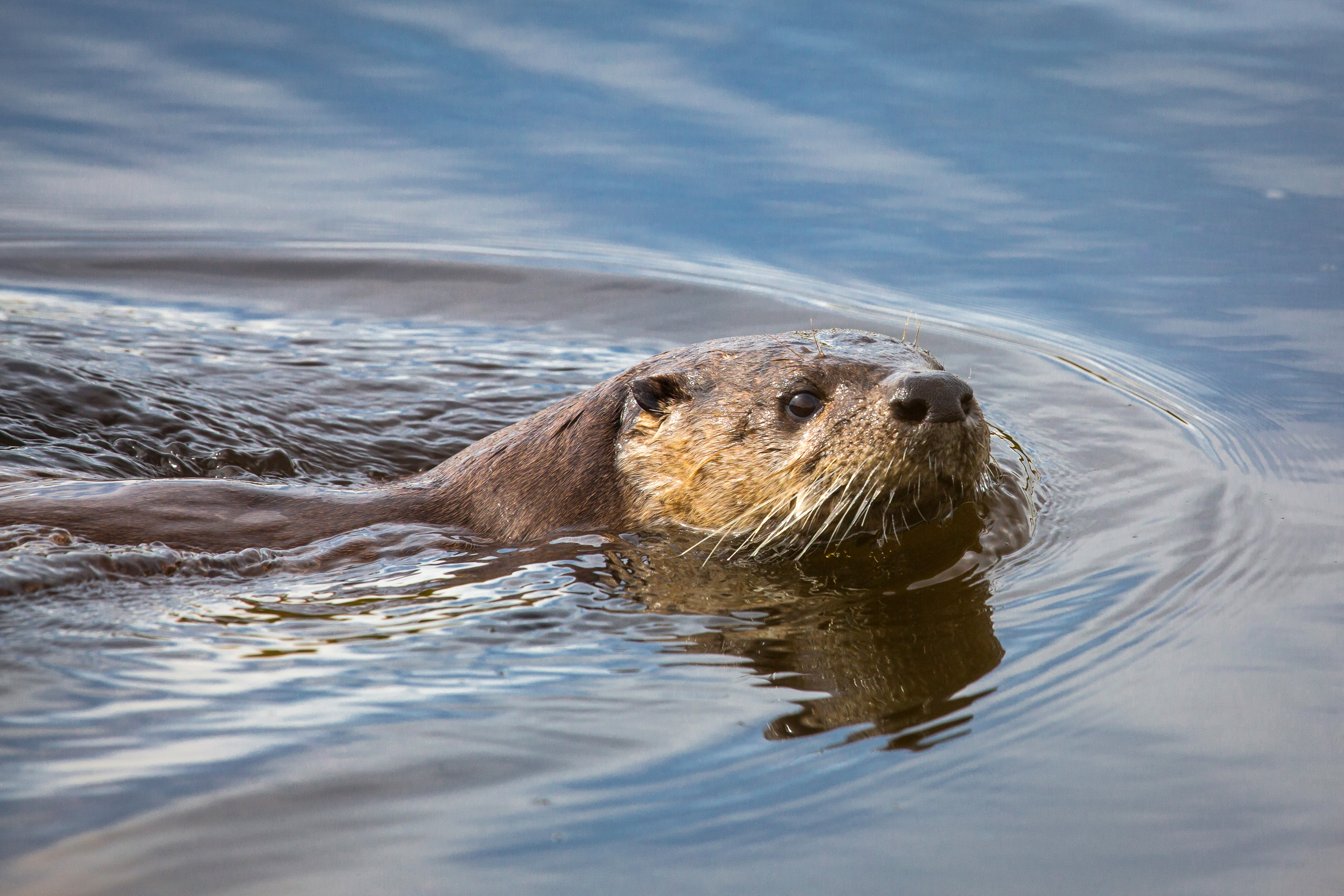
River otter (Lontra canadensis)

Raccoon (Procyon lotor)

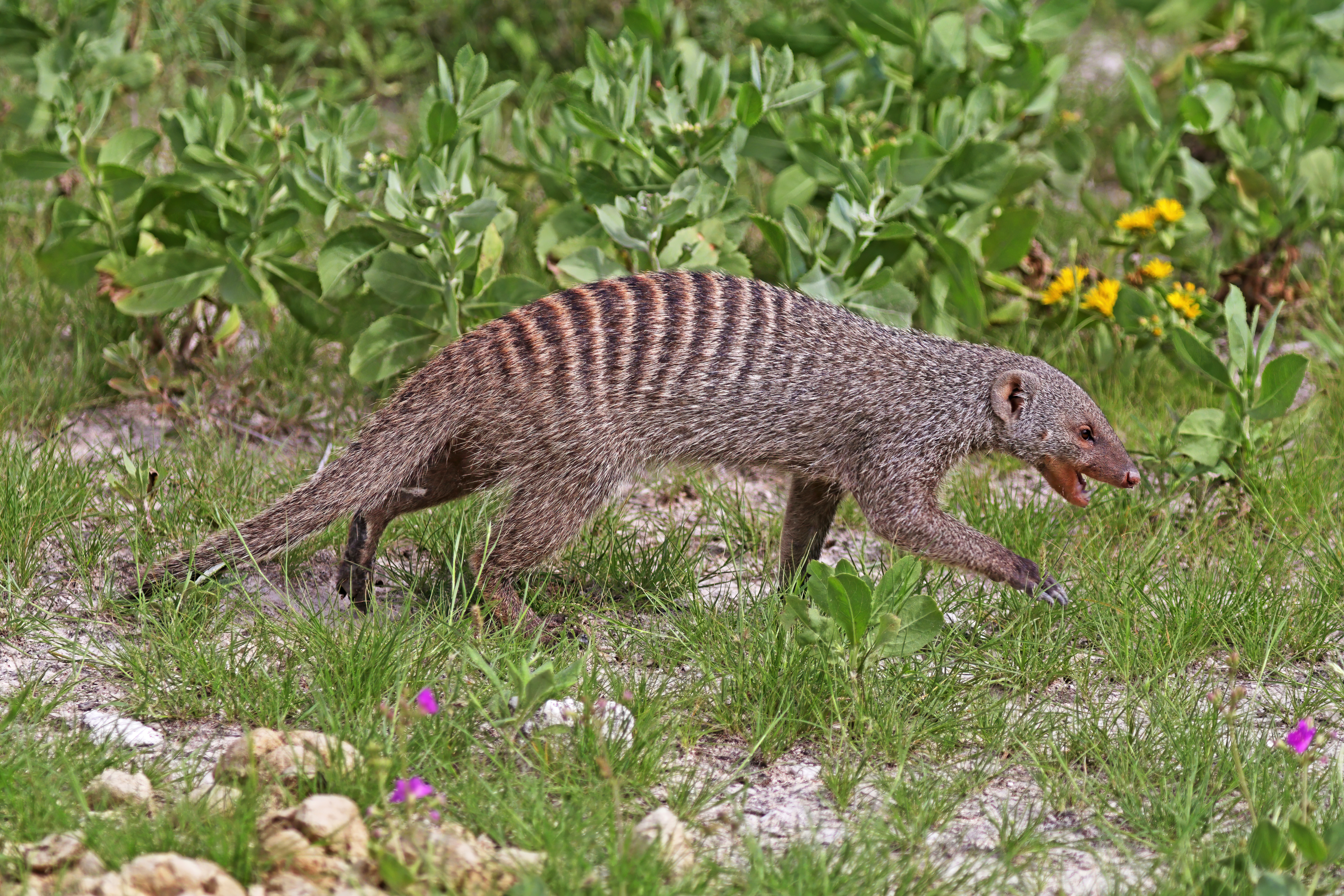
Mongoose (Herpestidae)

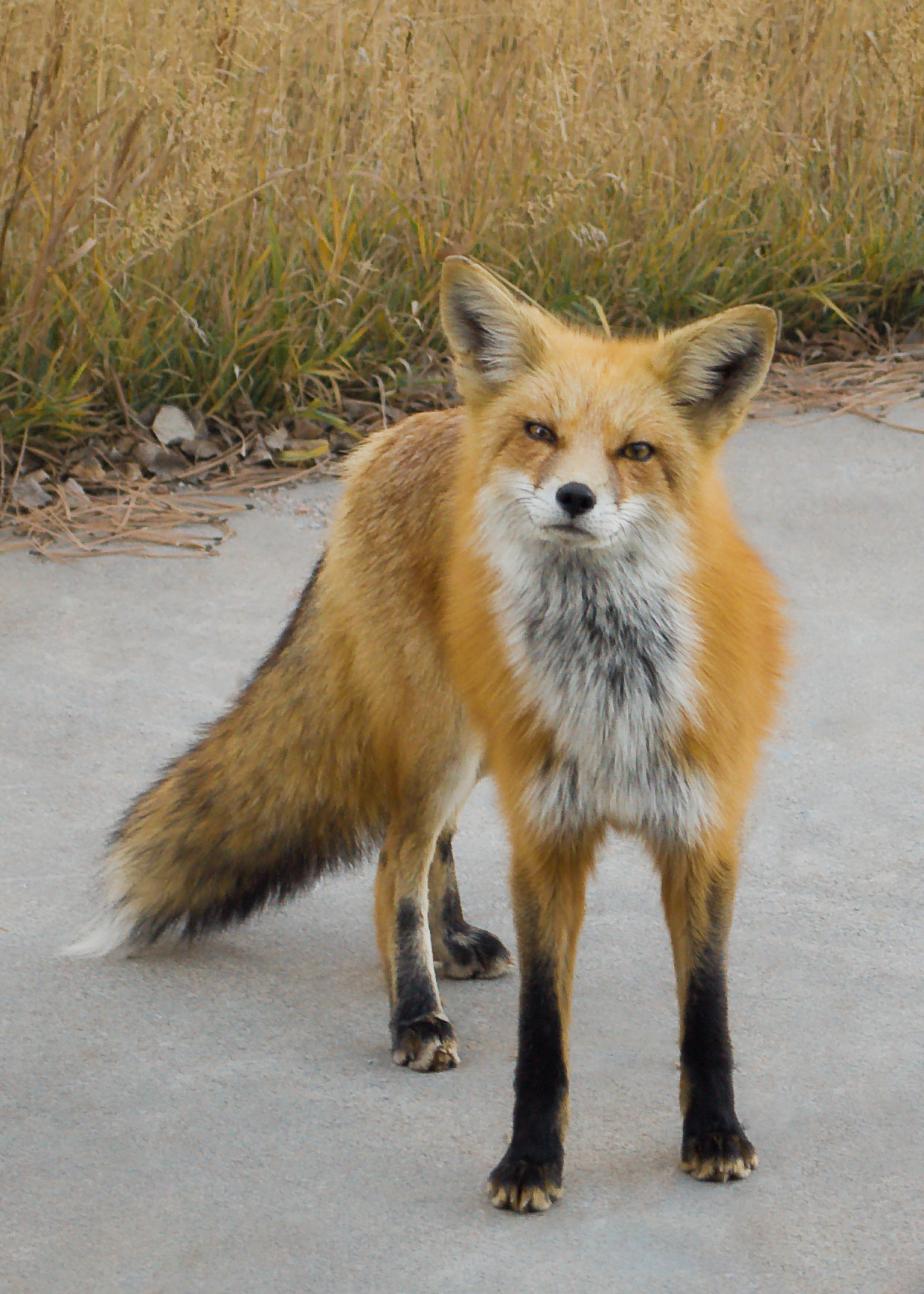
Red fox (Vulpes vulpes)

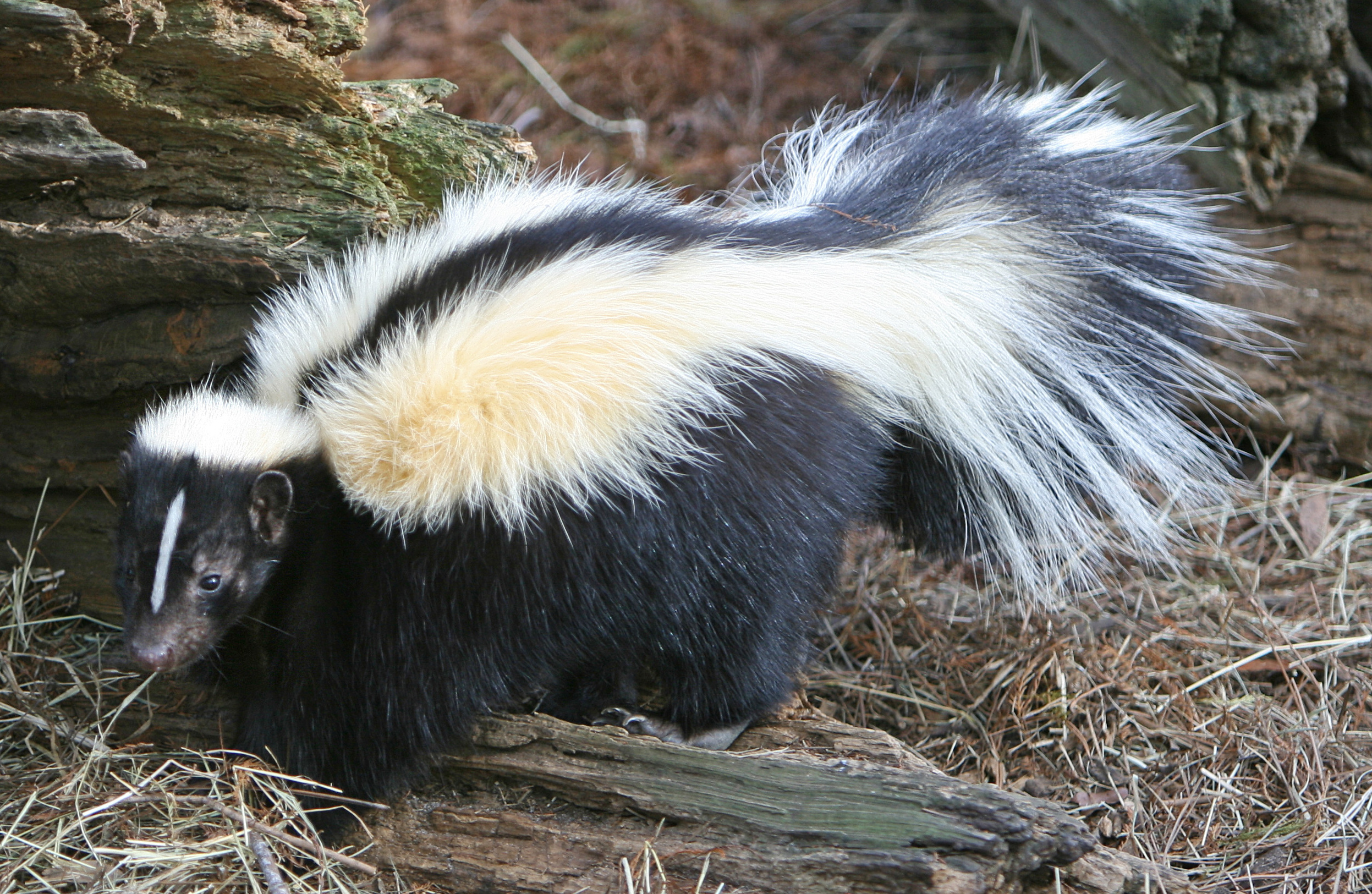
Striped skunk (Mephitis mephitis)

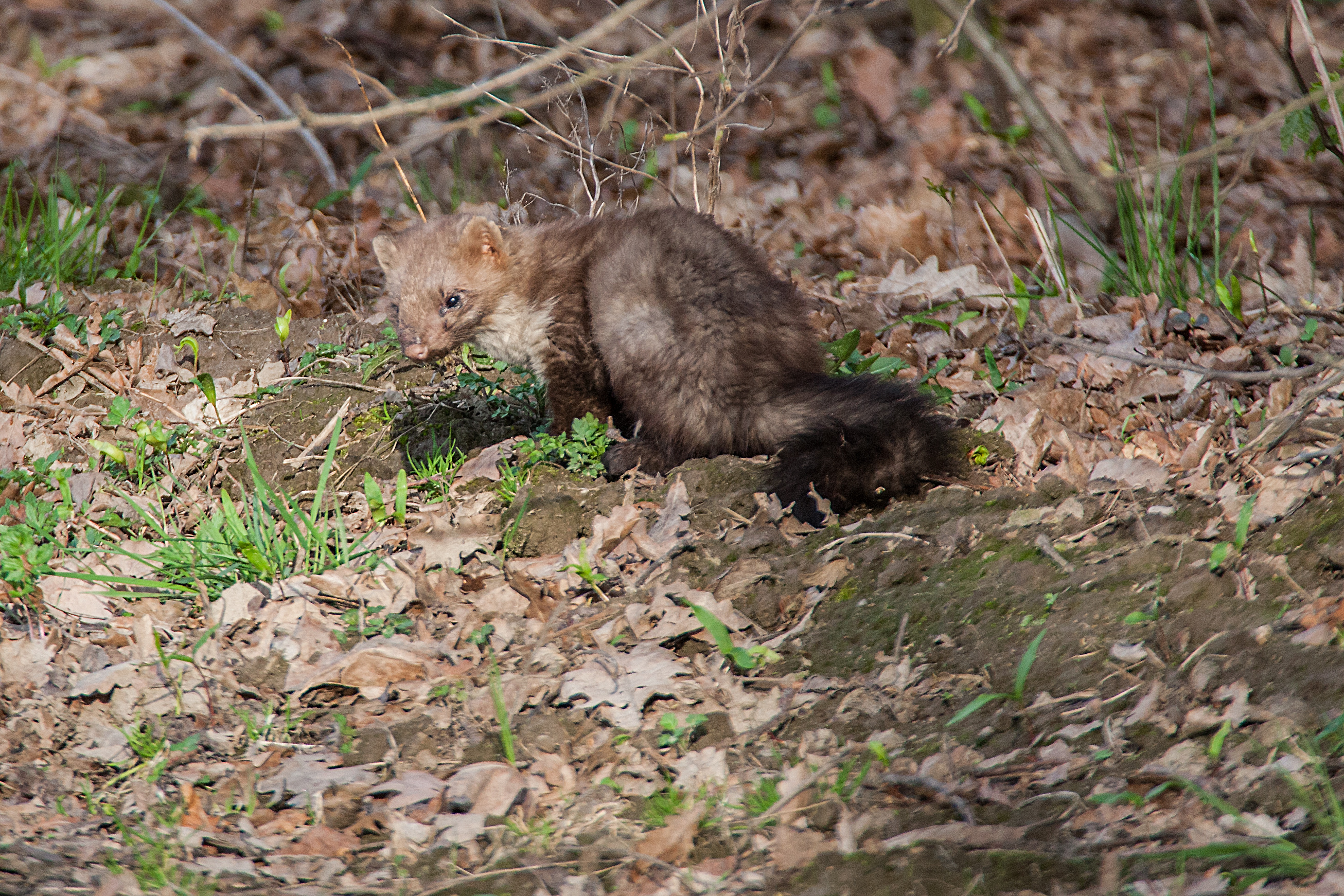
Stone marten (Martes foina)

== See also ==
- Hypercarnivore
- Hypocarnivore
- Mesopredator
- Omnivore
- List of feeding behaviours
