= Procyon (disambiguation) =

Procyon is the name of the brightest star in the constellation of Canis Minor.

Procyon may also refer to:

- Procyon (genus), a genus of nocturnal mammals commonly known as raccoons.
- USS Procyon, the name of several U.S. ships.
- Procyon Peaks, a pair of mountains in Antarctica.
- PROCYON, a spacecraft that was intended to perform an asteroid fly-by.
