= Capella Rocks =

The Capella Rocks (70°39′S 66°32′W) form a low, rocky ridge composed of several nunataks, located near the head of Bertram Glacier, 2 nautical miles (4 km) northeast of the Auriga Nunataks, in Palmer Land. They were named by the UK Antarctic Place-Names Committee after the star Capella in the constellation of Auriga.
