= Sirius Cliffs =

Sirius Cliffs (70°33′S 66°53′W) is a conspicuous isolated nunatak with steep rock cliffs all along its north face, located between Mount Lepus and Procyon Peaks on the south side of Millett Glacier, in Palmer Land, Antarctica. Named by United Kingdom Antarctic Place-Names Committee (UK-APC) after the star Sirius in the constellation of Canis Major.
