= Mount Lepus =

Mountain in Palmer Land, Antarctica

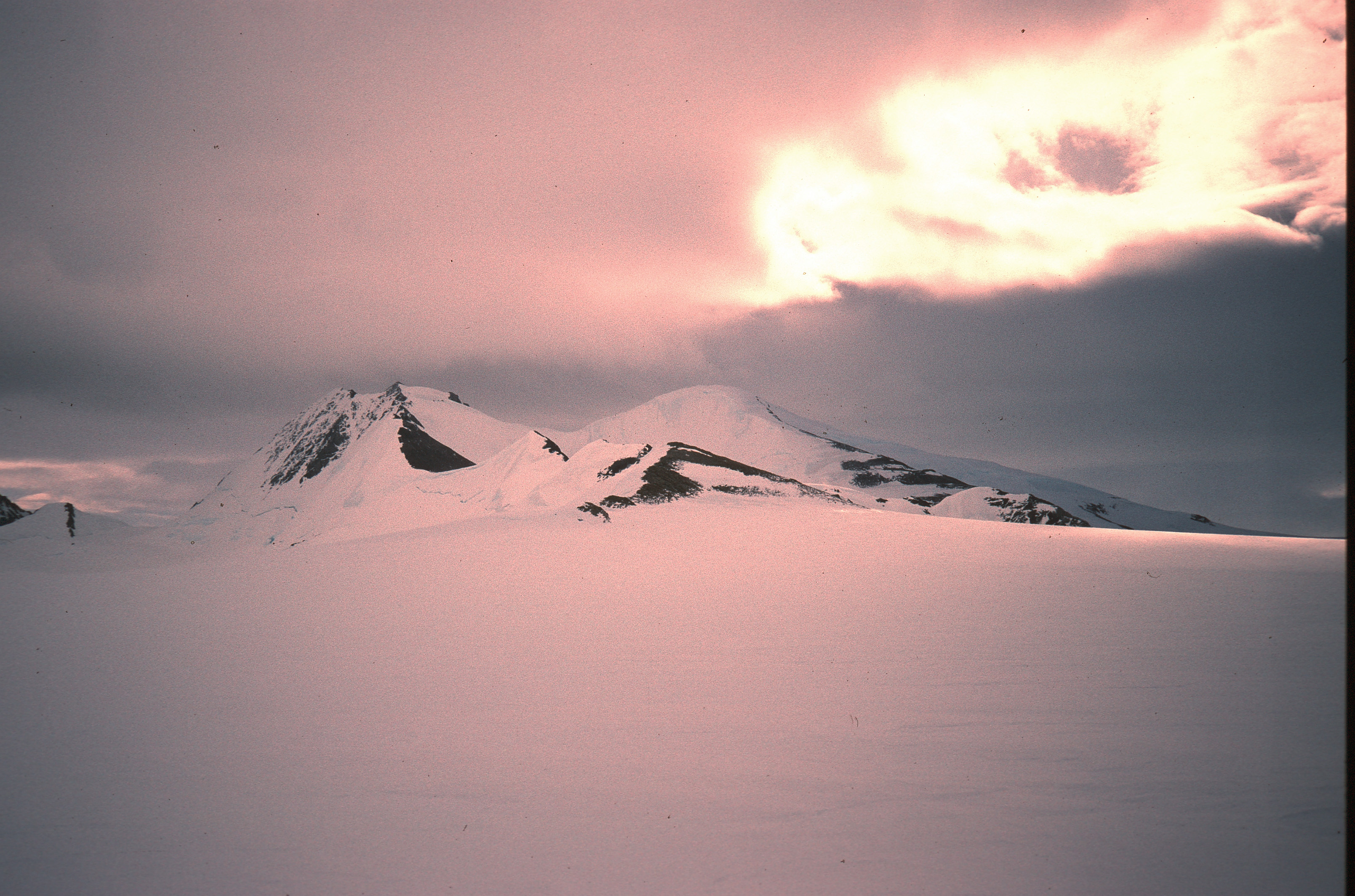
Mount Lepus eastern ridges from east

Mount Lepus (70°40′S 67°10′W) is a large rocky massif separated into two distinct sections by a deep saddle, standing between Millett Glacier and Bertram Glacier, about 10 nautical miles (20 km) east of Wade Point on the west coast of Palmer Land, Antarctica. It was named by the UK Antarctic Place-Names Committee after the constellation of Lepus.
