= Island raccoon =

Common name for several subspecies

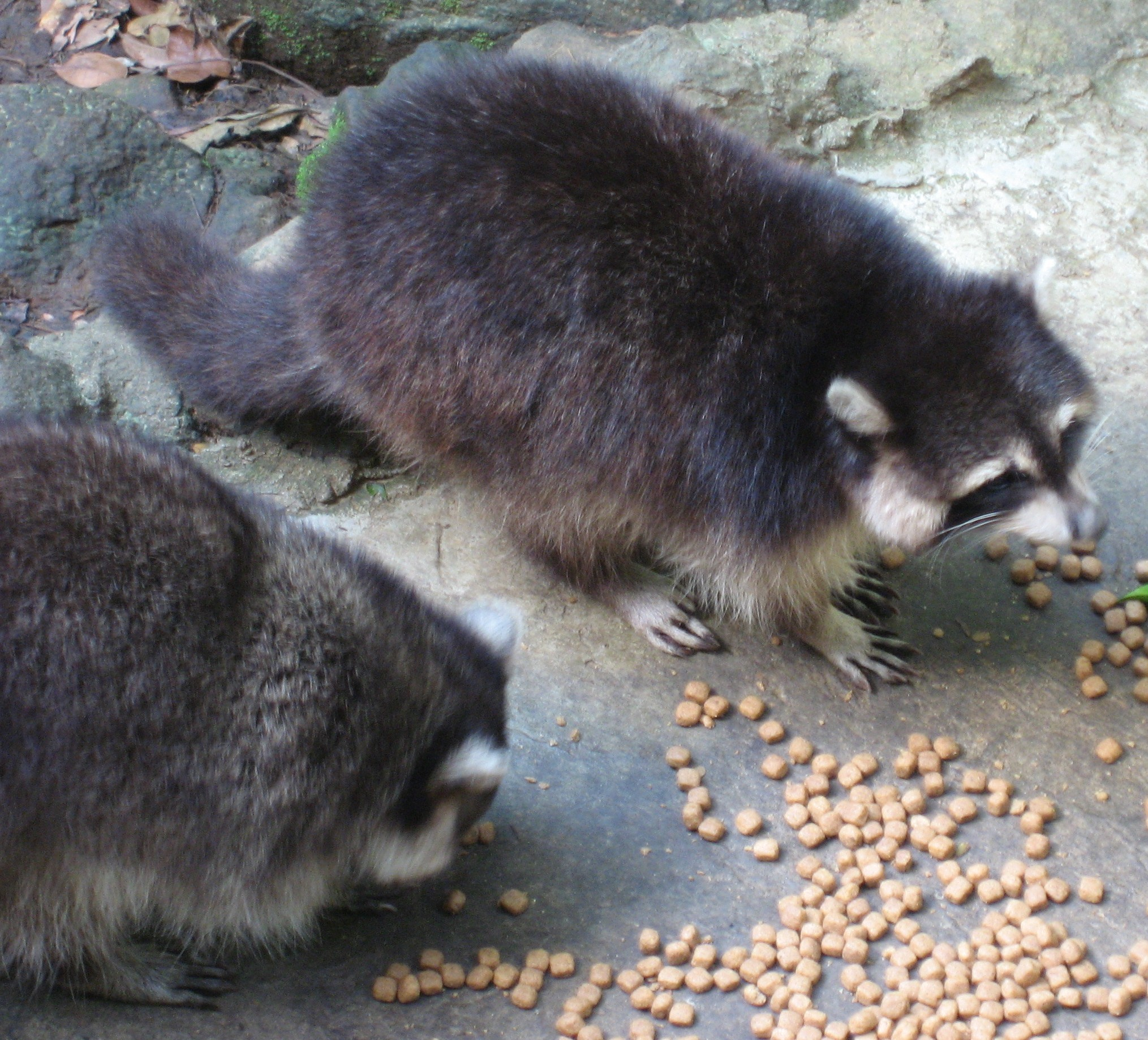
Guadeloupe raccoons in the Parc des Mamelles on Basse-Terre, Guadeloupe

The term island raccoons is used as a generic term for four endangered and one (or two) extinct subspecies or species of raccoon (Procyon) endemic on small Mexican and Caribbean islands, such as Cozumel and Guadeloupe. Other subspecies of raccoon living on islands, like that of the common raccoon (Procyon lotor) native to the Florida Keys, are generally not included under this term, since it was established at a time when all five (or six) "island raccoons" were considered distinct species. The five (or six) populations are:

- Bahamian raccoon (Procyon lotor maynardi): subspecies of the common raccoon endemic on New Providence Island in the Bahamas
- Barbados raccoon (Procyon lotor gloveralleni): extinct subspecies of the common raccoon endemic on Barbados until 1964
- Cozumel raccoon (Procyon pygmaeus): species endemic on Cozumel
- Guadeloupe raccoon (Procyon lotor minor): subspecies of the common raccoon endemic on the two main islands Basse-Terre Island and Grande-Terre of Guadeloupe, which is assumed to be consubspecific (of the same subspecies) with the Bahamian raccoon
- Tres Marias raccoon (Procyon lotor insularis): subspecies of the common raccoon endemic on the two main islands María Madre and María Magdalena of the Islas Marías, which is probably extinct on María Magdalena (this population is sometimes considered to be a separate subspecies (Procyon lotor vicinus)

== Classification ==
After studies of their morphological and genetic traits in 1999, 2003 and 2005, only the Cozumel raccoon is still considered a distinct species, while the others were classified as subspecies of the common raccoon in the third edition of Mammal Species of the World published in 2005. It is assumed that the four (or five) other island forms were introduced to their respective islands just a few centuries ago, probably by humans. The Guadeloupe raccoon is even considered of the same species as the similar Bahamian raccoon. Its former scientific name Procyon (lotor) minor is listed as a synonym for Procyon lotor maynardi.

== Description ==
Apart from the comparatively large Tres Marias raccoon, all island raccoons are smaller than an average-sized common raccoon, making them examples of insular dwarfism. With a weight between 3 and 4 kg (6.6–8.8 lbs), the Cozumel raccoon is the smallest type of raccoon, except for Procyon lotor auspicatus endemic on Key Vaca in the Florida Keys. While a short and delicate skull is all in common except for the Tres Marias raccoon, the noticeable small teeth of the Cozumel raccoon suggest that it was separated from the mainland form long ago. The coat color of all island raccoons is gray or dark gray and on the underparts only few guard hairs cover the light brown ground hairs.

== Conservation ==
The last sighting of the Barbados raccoon occurred in 1964, when one specimen was killed by a car on a road near Bathsheba. All four extant populations were classified as endangered by the IUCN in 1996, since less than 2,500 mature individuals were living in the wild and the population numbers continue to decline. Katherine W. McFadden gives an estimated number of fewer than 194 mature individuals of the Cozumel raccoons in her dissertation and argues that it should be even classified as critically endangered. Apart from the fact that the Guadeloupe raccoon has been chosen as an emblematic species for Guadeloupe National Park, no conservation efforts have been made to protect these populations from extinction. Habitat destruction and hunting are the biggest threats to their survival. Considering their small ranges, they were most likely never numerous. While Kristofer M. Helgen and Don E. Wilson, who have done the most recent research about island raccoons, are of the opinion that the Cozumel raccoon should be considered a high conservation priority, the other three subspecies may themselves pose a threat to the insular ecosystem as invasive species.
