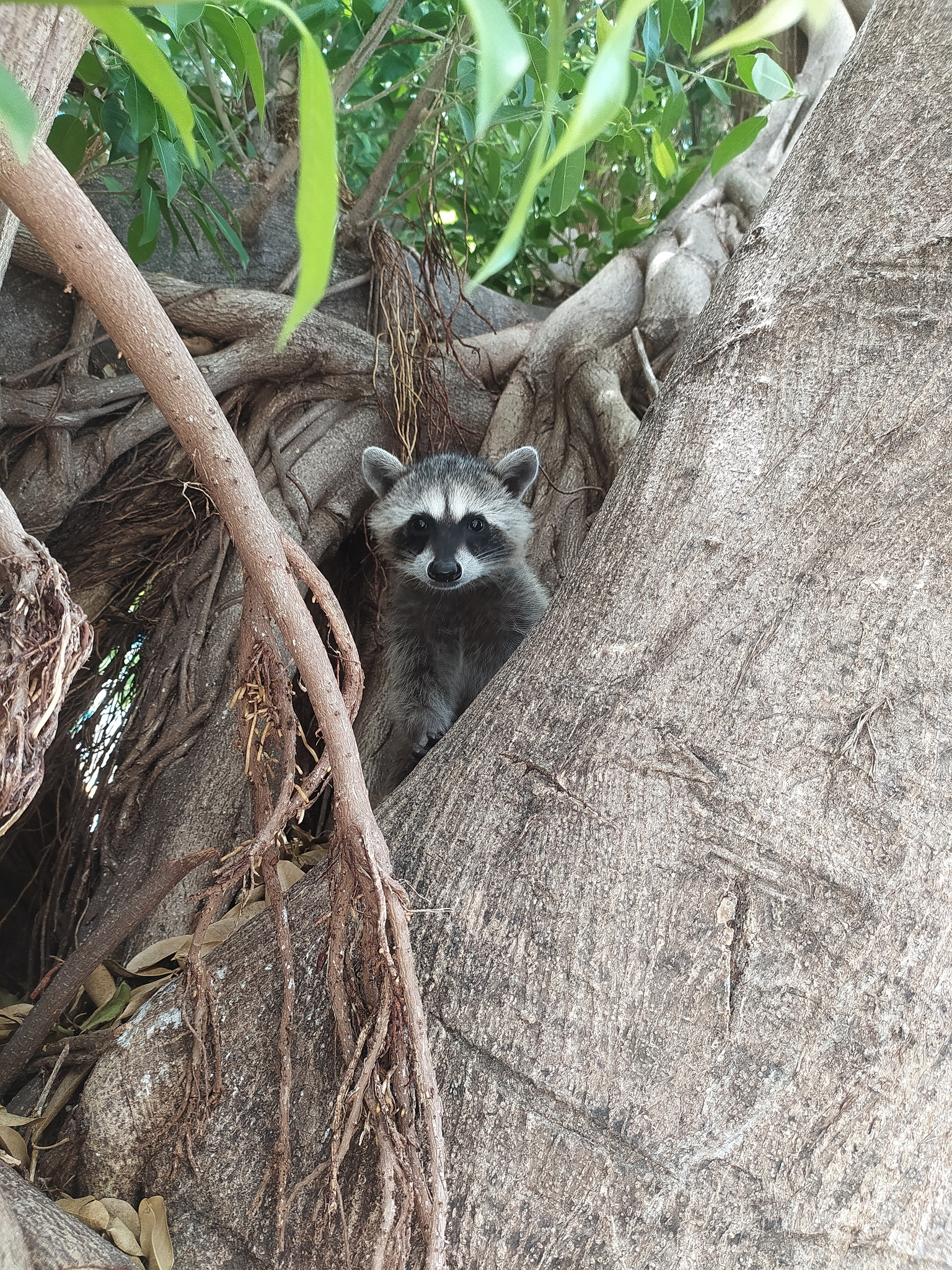
- Procyon lotor insularis on Maria Madre Island

Scientific classification
- Kingdom: Animalia
- Phylum: Chordata
- Class: Mammalia
- Order: Carnivora
- Family: Procyonidae
- Genus: Procyon
- Species: P. lotor
- Subspecies: P. l. insularis

Trinomial name
- Procyon lotor insularis (Merriam, 1898)

= Tres Marias raccoon =

Subspecies of carnivore

The Tres Marias raccoon (Procyon lotor insularis) is a subspecies of the common raccoon endemic to the two main islands of the Islas Marías, an archipelago off the western coast of the Mexican state of Nayarit. Although sometimes historically considered a separate species, the Tres Marias raccoon is now regarded to be a subspecies of the common raccoon, introduced to the Islas Marías in the recent past. It is slightly larger than the common raccoon and has a distinctive angular skull. There are fewer than 250 mature individuals on the islands, where they are hunted by islanders; the International Union for Conservation of Nature has designated the species as endangered.

== Classification ==
In its initial description in 1898, the Tres Marias raccoon was classified as a subspecies of the common raccoon (Procyon lotor) by Clinton Hart Merriam. In 1950, Edward Alphonso Goldman identified it as a distinct species, a view that had been upheld by most scientists until recently. In a study of a pair of mounted specimens in 2005, Kristofer M. Helgen and Don E. Wilson came to the conclusion that there are morphological differences between the Tres Marias raccoon and the subspecies Procyon lotor hernandezii of the common raccoon found on the Mexican mainland, but that they are not large enough to justify the classification as distinct species. It is therefore assumed that the Tres Marias raccoon was introduced to the Islas Marías not long ago. Subsequently, the Tres Marias raccoon was listed as a subspecies of the common raccoon in the third edition of Mammal Species of the World by Wilson and DeeAnn M. Reeder, published in 2005.

== Description ==
The average body length of five adult males, including the tail, was recorded as 84.1 cm (33.1 in) by Edward William Nelson in 1898. Three mounted specimens, which were between 84.0 and 90.4 cm (33.1 and 35.6 in) long, were measured in 2005. Samuel I. Zeveloff calls the Tres Marias raccoon larger than an average-sized common raccoon, meaning the species is not an example of insular dwarfism. The coat of the Tres Marias raccoon is pale and short and on its underparts only a few guard hairs cover the light brown ground hairs. Its most distinctive feature relative to other raccoon subspecies is its angular skull. Another feature different from that of the northern raccoon is that it has narrow molars.

== Conservation ==
In 1996, the Tres Marias raccoon was classified as endangered by the IUCN since less than 250 mature individuals were living in the wild. The subspecies Procyon insularis vicinus, endemic to the island of María Magdalena, is assumed to be extinct. Because only two mounted specimens of this subspecies exist in museums, it will probably never be known whether it is taxonomically distinct from the subspecies endemic on María Madre. The Tres Marias raccoon is hunted by the islanders and no conservation efforts have been made to protect the species from extinction. Considering its small range, the Tres Marias raccoon was most likely never numerous, like the four other island raccoons (Cozumel raccoon, Bahamian raccoon, Guadeloupe raccoon, and the extinct Barbados raccoon).

== See also ==
- Mexican raccoon
