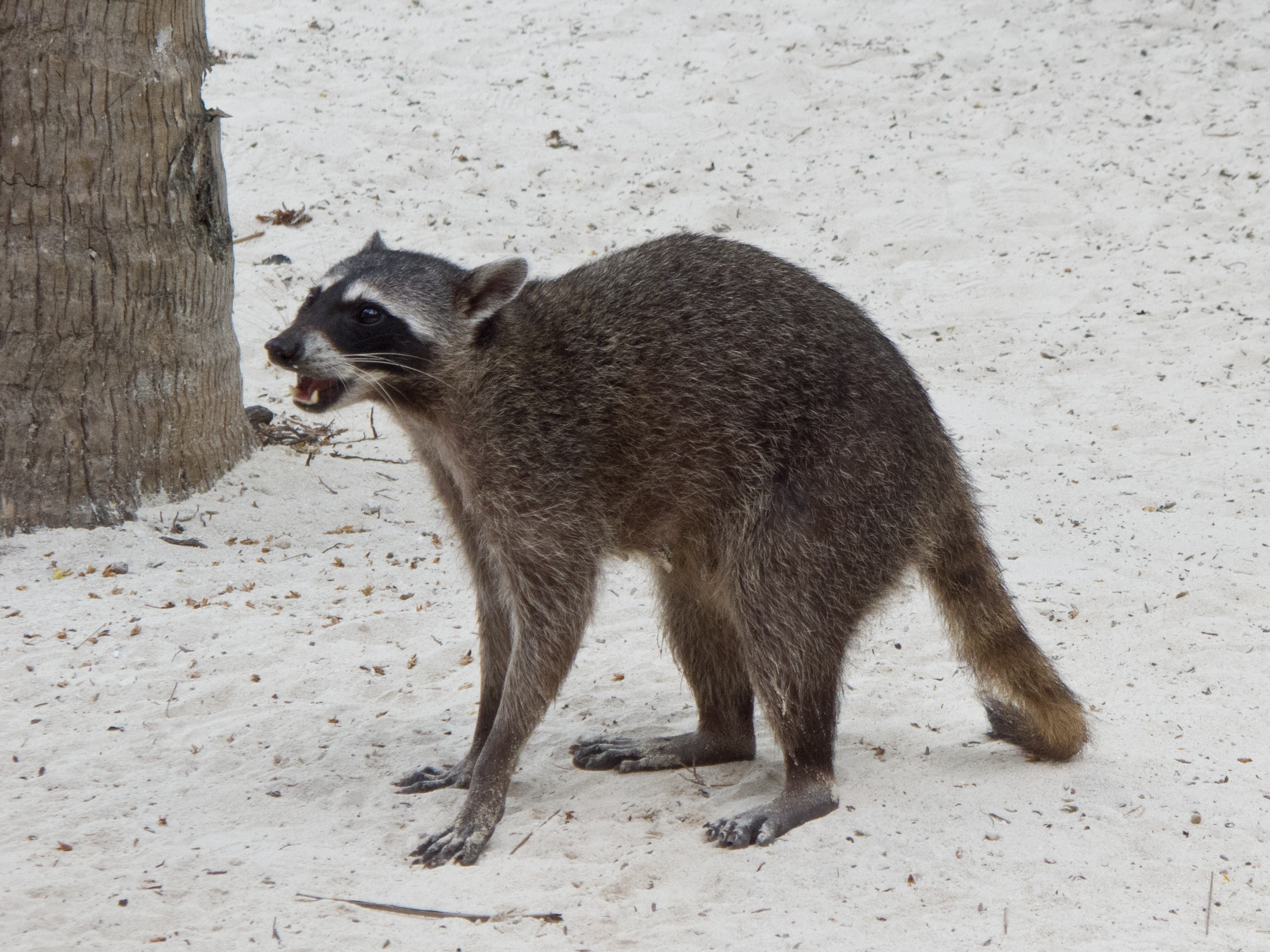
- Procyon lotor hernandezii in the Yucatán Peninsula, Mexico

Scientific classification
- Kingdom: Animalia
- Phylum: Chordata
- Class: Mammalia
- Order: Carnivora
- Family: Procyonidae
- Genus: Procyon
- Species: P. lotor
- Subspecies: P. l. hernandezii

Trinomial name
- Procyon lotor hernandezii Wagler, 1831

Synonyms
- List: Procyon lotor shufeldti; Procyon lotor crassidens; Procyon lotor dickeyi; Procyon lotor mexicanus

= Mexican raccoon =

Subspecies of raccoon

The Mexican raccoon (Procyon lotor hernandezii), also known as the Mexican Plateau raccoon, Yucatan raccoon, or Campeche raccoon, is a subspecies of the common raccoon native to Mexico and much of Central America. It is the most widespread raccoon subspecies in this region, occupying diverse habitats from tropical lowlands to montane forests.

== Classification and taxonomy ==
The Mexican raccoon was first described in 1831 by the German zoologist Johann Georg Wagler, who named it Procyon hernandezii. Historically, many different subspecies names were applied to raccoons in Mexico and Central America. Early 20th-century taxonomists like Edward William Nelson and Edward Alp Goldman named numerous forms (e.g. P. l. hernandezii, P. l. mexicanus, P. l. shufeldti, P. l. crassidens, P. l. dickeyi), based on regional variations in size or coloration. However, modern systematic reviews have concluded that most of these mainland forms are not sufficiently distinct and intergrade with each other. In a comprehensive revision of raccoons from Mexico and Central America, researchers found a continuous cline of increasing body size from north to south and merged those named forms into a single subspecies. As a result, P. l. hernandezii (Wagler, 1831) is now the oldest and valid name encompassing those populations, with names like P. l. shufeldti and others placed in synonymy under it.

Currently, only three subspecies of Procyon lotor are recognized in Mexico–Central America: Procyon lotor hernandezii on the mainland from Mexico through Central America, Procyon lotor pumilus in Panama, and Procyon lotor insularis on the Tres Marías Islands.

The Cozumel raccoon or pygmy raccoon, Procyon pygmaeus, found on Cozumel Island, was once considered to be related to the Mexican raccoons of mainland Mexico, but is now considered a distinct species of raccoon.

== Description ==
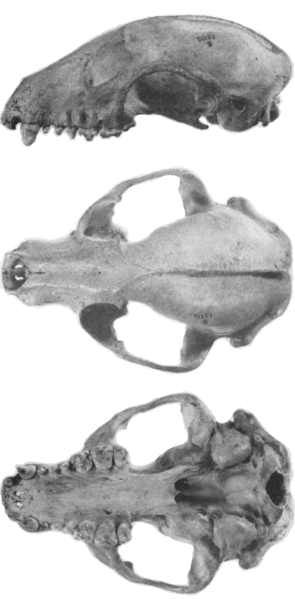
Skull

The raccoons have a grayish coat that varies in shade depending on its region, often overlaid with black-tipped hairs. It has the characteristic black facial mask, a bushy ringed tail, and a somewhat flattened skull with strong dentition. Overall, in comparison to raccoons from the colder northern parts of North America, Mexican raccoons tend to have somewhat shorter fur (an adaptation to warmer climates) and can show slight regional color variation from gray to buffy or reddish tones. Those from the plateau region tend to have longer, darker fur, while individuals from the Yucatán and Campeche areas have shorter, paler coats. The skull of the Mexican raccoon is of moderate size, with greatest skull lengths around 11–13 cm, and well-developed cheek teeth for an omnivorous diet.

== Distribution and habitat ==
The range of the Mexican raccoon covers most of the Mexican mainland (primarily central, western, and southern Mexico) and extends southward through Guatemala, Belize, El Salvador, Honduras, Nicaragua, Costa Rica, to northern Panama. There is evidence of the subspecies occurring at relatively high elevations; for example, a specimen was documented in pine-oak forest at about 2,272 m in the central state of Tlaxcala.

In terms of habitat, the Mexican raccoon is highly adaptable and can be found in forest ecosystems ranging from tropical rainforests and mangrove swamps in coastal lowlands to temperate oak-pine woodlands and dry deciduous forests in upland areas. A key habitat requirement is the presence of fresh water sources (raccoons need water for drinking and often forage near water). They most often occur in moist woodland and riparian zones and generally avoid extremely arid areas without permanent water. During seasons when wild fruits are abundant, raccoons may venture further from water, but in dry periods they return to the vicinity of streams or ponds within their home range.

== Diet ==
The diet of the Mexican raccoon is highly varied and changes with season and local availability of food. Studies of its feeding habits consistently show a mixture of plant and animal matter. In general, the raccoons eat fruits, nuts, seeds, and other plant parts, as well as a wide array of animals ranging from insects and other invertebrates to small vertebrates (e.g. fish, frogs, lizards, rodents, birds' eggs).

Plant material often makes up a substantial portion of the diet, especially in times or habitats where fruits are abundant. For example, a fecal analysis study of Mexican raccoons on the Pacific coast of Jalisco found that plant matter constituted about 41% of the raccoon's diet (by frequency of occurrence in scats), while animal prey made up the rest – notably insects (~18%) and crustaceans (~18%) were the next most notable food categories.

Mexican raccoons often hunt for insects by turning over leaf litter or probing rotten logs. They also frequent riverbanks, ponds, and seashores to catch aquatic prey, and they will wade in shallow water to feel for frogs or fish. Raccoons are known to raid bird nests for eggs or nestlings and occasionally prey on small rodents or amphibians. Overall, their diet shifts opportunistically – during certain times of year, fruits might dominate (for instance, mangoes or wild figs in late summer) and at other times animal protein is key (in winter months or lean fruit seasons, they rely more on insects, eggs, or human refuse). This dietary flexibility is a major factor in the Mexican raccoon's success in both wild and urban environments.

== Interactions with humans ==
Farmers in Mexico consider Mexican raccoons to be an agricultural pest and report raccoons raiding cornfields, melon patches, and fruit orchards. The species shows a "predilection for cultivated grains, among them maize (corn), which makes it potentially harmful to crop fields." In parts of Jalisco, local residents identify the raccoon as one of the most common farmland carnivores and blame it for damage to corn and papaya crops. Notably, the Mexican raccoon's feeding habit of sampling and moving on (rather than finishing one ear of corn, it may pull down several and take bites) can exacerbate crop losses. They will climb fruit trees (such as mango or citrus groves) and eat the fruit, or break stalks in maize fields to reach the ears of corn.

Habituation has become a significant problem for Mexican raccoons in many tourist areas throughout their range. In various parts of Mexico such as Celestún, Ciudad Madero, Playa Miramar, and Puerto Vallarta, feeding raccoons has become a tourist activity. In Puerto Vallarta, feeding Mexican raccoons at Taquería Los Mapaches has become a popular attraction due to viral social media content. In Panama City, a similar phenomenon has been observed along the Cinta Costera. There, tourists have altered the natural diets of the Mexican raccoon which has caused concern among biologists. Once primarily frugivorous, these raccoons now consume processed human foods and garbage, leading to changes in their metabolism and behavior.

Authorities have raised concerns about public health risks associated with increased human-raccoon contact. Health officials across Mexico have urged tourists to avoid feeding raccoons due to the risk of rabies transmission. Though attacks on humans are rare, Mexican officials warn that raccoons are still wild animals and may bite if provoked or if they associate humans with food. In 2021, The National Center for Disease Control and Prevention detected multiple cases of rabies in Mexican raccoons around Playa Miramar.

== See also ==
- Tres Marias Raccoon
