= Auriga Nunataks =

Nunatak group in Palmer Land, Antarctica

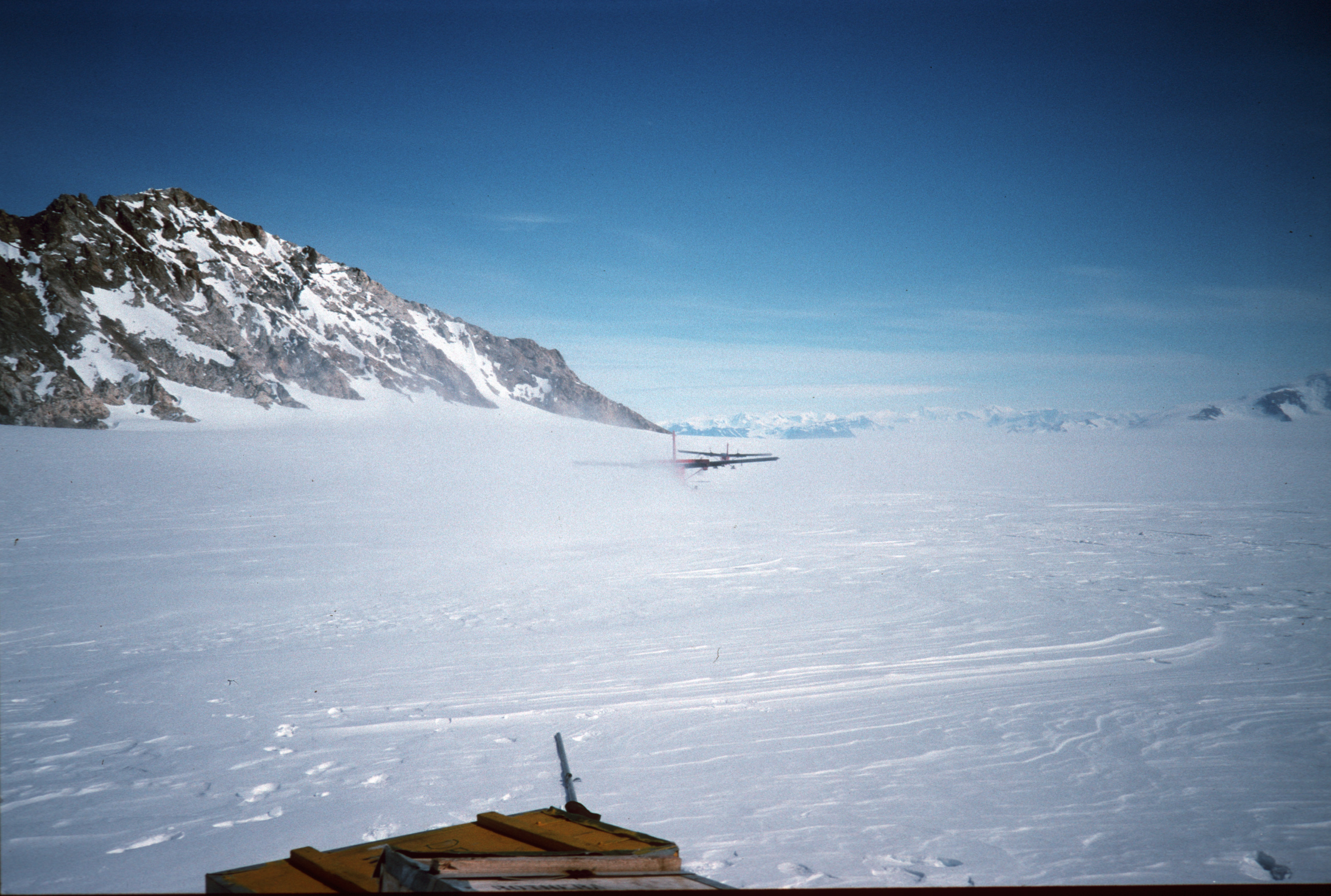
Two Twin Otters from British Antarctic Survey landing by the Auriga Nunataks

The Auriga Nunataks (70°42′S 66°38′W) are a small group of nunataks in Palmer Land, Antarctica, located 21 miles (34 km) east of Wade Point at the head of Bertram Glacier. The highest of these rises to a sharp peak and is visible for a great distance. They were named by the UK Antarctic Place-Names Committee after the constellation of Auriga.
