= Lepus (disambiguation) =

Lepus is a genus of mammals in the family Leporidae.

Lepus may also refer to:

- Lepus (constellation)
- Amnirana lepus, a species of frog
- Arieșeni (Hungarian: Lepus), a commune in Romania
- Mount Lepus, a massif in Antarctica
