= Procyon rexroadensis =

Procyon rexroadensis Temporal range: Piacenzian to Gelasian, 3.6–1.8 Ma

Scientific classification
- Kingdom: Animalia
- Phylum: Chordata
- Class: Mammalia
- Infraclass: Placentalia
- Order: Carnivora
- Family: Procyonidae
- Genus: Procyon
- Species: †P. rexroadensis

Binomial name
- †Procyon rexroadensis Hibbard, 1941

Extinct species of Raccoon

Procyon rexroadensis is an extinct species of procyonid from the Late Blancan of Kansas, United States.

The species was described in 1941 by Claude W. Hibbard. The fossil itself was collected from the Rexroad Formation in Meade County, Kansas. Procyon rexroadensis was long regarded as the oldest known species of Procyon. In 2025, the description of the older species Procyon garberi from the Late Miocene of California displaced it as the earliest known member of the genus.
