= USS Procyon =

USS Procyon may refer to the following ships of the United States Navy:

- USS Procyon (AG-11), built in 1919 by American International Shipbuilding, Hog Island, Pennsylvania.
- USS Procyon (AK-19), laid down 15 January 1940 as MC hull 22, SS Sweepstakes, by Tampa SB & DD Co., Tampa, Florida.
- USS Procyon (AF-61), laid down 15 April 1942 as MC hull No. 188 by the Moore DD Co., Oakland, California.
