= Barbados raccoon =

Conservation status
- Extinct (1964)

Scientific classification
- Kingdom: Animalia
- Phylum: Chordata
- Class: Mammalia
- Infraclass: Placentalia
- Order: Carnivora
- Family: Procyonidae
- Genus: Procyon
- Species: P. lotor
- Subspecies: †P. l. gloveralleni

Trinomial name
- †Procyon lotor gloveralleni (Nelson and Goldman, 1930)

Synonyms
- Procyon gloveralleni

Extinct subspecies of carnivore

The Barbados raccoon (Procyon lotor gloveralleni) is an extinct subspecies of the common raccoon (Procyon lotor), that was endemic on Barbados in the Lesser Antilles until 1964.

== Classification ==
In 1950, Edward Alphonso Goldman identified the Barbados raccoon as a distinct species, a classification that has been challenged over the past years by other scientists, who assume that it was a subspecies of the common raccoon. This assumption was supported by a study of its morphological and genetic analysis in 2003 by Kristofer M. Helgen and Don E. Wilson, which indicated that the Barbados raccoon was introduced by humans just a few centuries ago. The study yielded the same result for the probably closely related subspecies Guadeloupe raccoon and Bahaman raccoon also living on West Indian islands. Therefore, the Barbados raccoon is listed as a subspecies of the common raccoon in the third edition of Mammal Species of the World published in 2005.

== Description ==
Compared to an average sized common raccoon the Barbados raccoon is small, making it an example of insular dwarfism. The Barbados raccoon bears resemblance to the Guadeloupe raccoon, for example in the short and delicate skull and the dark gray coat with a slight ocher tint on the neck and shoulders. Similarly, only few guard hairs cover the ground hairs on the underparts. The mask is continuous across the face.

== Extinction ==
In 1996, the Barbados raccoon was classified as extinct by the IUCN since its last sighting occurred in 1964, when one specimen was killed by a car on a road near Bathsheba. The only mounted specimen is exhibited at the Barbados Museum in the Garrison Historic Area. According to a report of the IUCN in 1994, a pair of another species of raccoon has been introduced to Barbados. Considering its small range, the Barbados raccoon was most likely never numerous except for the southern parts of the island. Habitat destruction due to tourism was probably one of the main causes for its extinction.

== See also ==
- Island raccoon
