= Millett Glacier =

Glacier in Antarctica

Millett Glacier (70°37′S 67°40′W) is a heavily crevassed glacier in Antarctica, 13 nautical miles (24 km) long and 7 nautical miles (13 km) wide, flowing west from the Dyer Plateau of Palmer Land to George VI Sound, immediately north of Wade Point. In its lower reaches the north side of this glacier merges with Meiklejohn Glacier. Millett Glacier was first surveyed in 1936 by the British Graham Land Expedition (BGLE) under John Rymill, and was named by the UK Antarctic Place-Names Committee in 1954 for Hugh M. Millett, chief engineer of the Penola during the BGLE.

== See also ==
- Sirius Cliffs
