= Procyon Peaks =

Group of mountains in Palmer Land, Antarctica

Procyon Peaks (70°29′S 66°30′W) are two ridges of peaks connected by a sledgeable pass, located between the upper parts of Millett and Bertram Glaciers, about 25 nautical miles (46 km) east of Moore Point on the west coast of Palmer Land. Named by United Kingdom Antarctic Place-Names Committee (UK-APC) after the star Procyon in the constellation of Canis Minor.
