= Wade Point =

Antarctic land formation

Wade Point (70°41′S 67°41′W) is a rocky mass fronting on George VI Sound, rising to 915 m and marking the west extremity of the rock ridge separating Millet and Bertram Glaciers on the west coast of Palmer Land. First surveyed in 1936 by the British Graham Land Expedition (BGLE) under Rymill. Named in 1954 by the members of the expedition for Muriel H. Wade, who was secretary to the BGLE.
