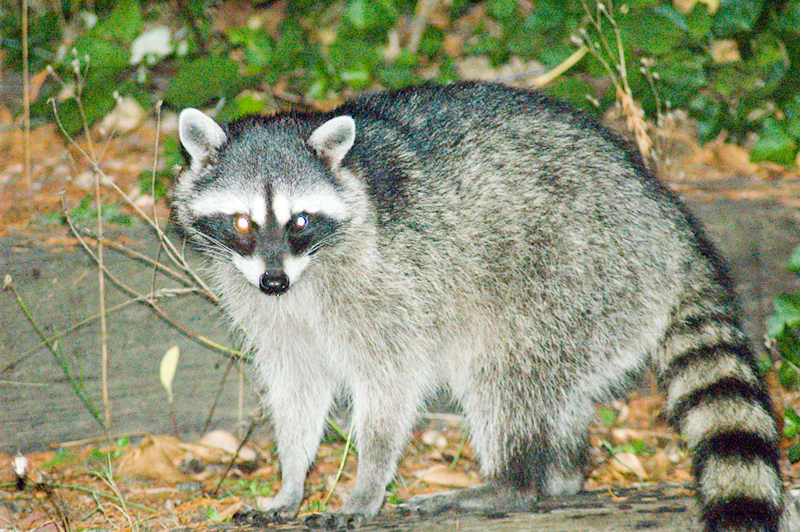
- Common raccoon (P. lotor)
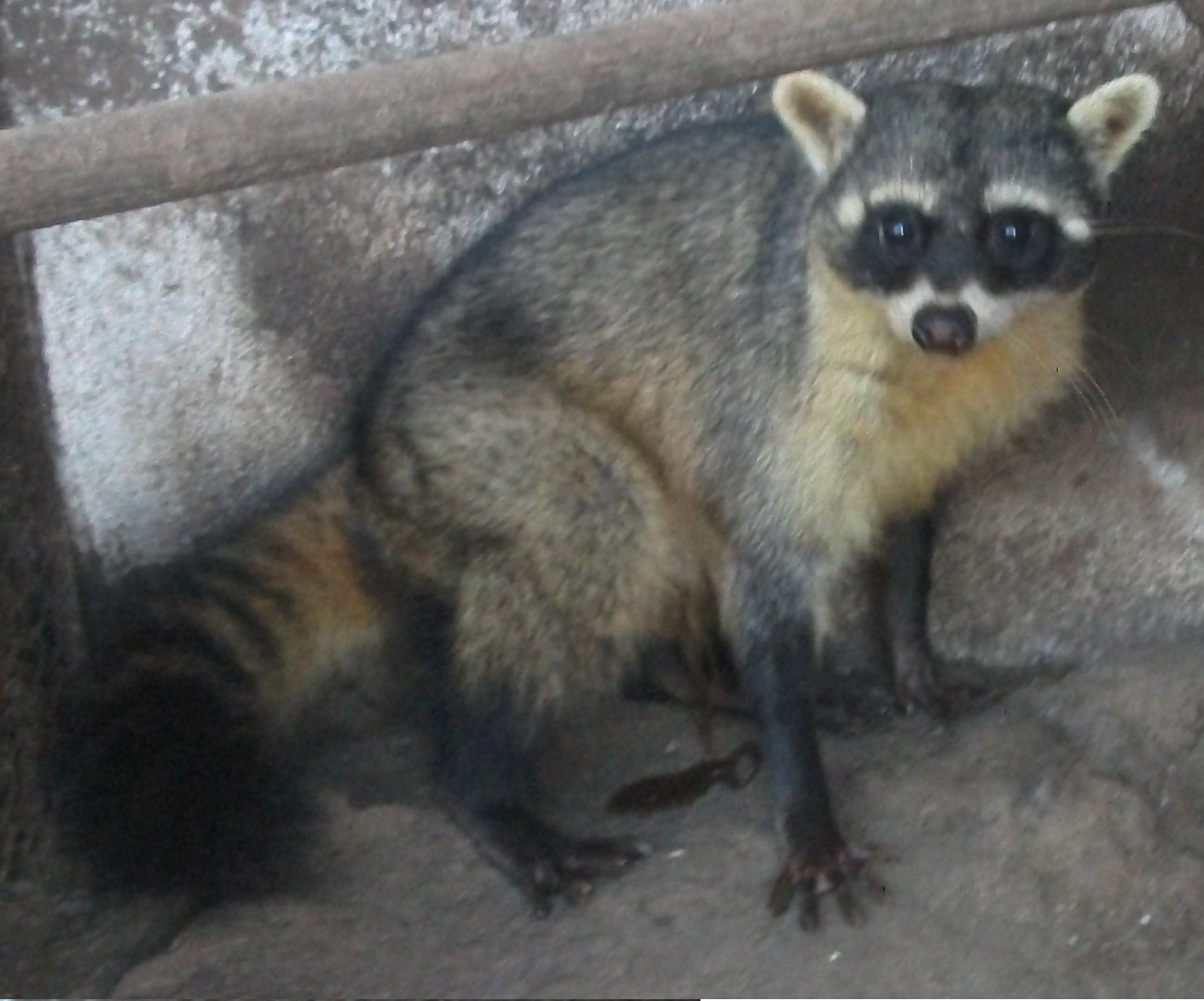
- Crab-eating raccoon (P. cancrivorus)

Scientific classification
- Kingdom: Animalia
- Phylum: Chordata
- Class: Mammalia
- Infraclass: Placentalia
- Order: Carnivora
- Family: Procyonidae
- Subfamily: Procyoninae
- Tribe: Procyonini
- Subtribe: Procyonina
- Genus: Procyon; Storr, 1780

Type species
- Ursus lotor Linnaeus, 1758

Species
- Procyon cancrivorus; Procyon lotor; Procyon pygmaeus; †Procyon garberi; †Procyon rexroadensis; †Procyon gipsoni; †Procyon megalokolos
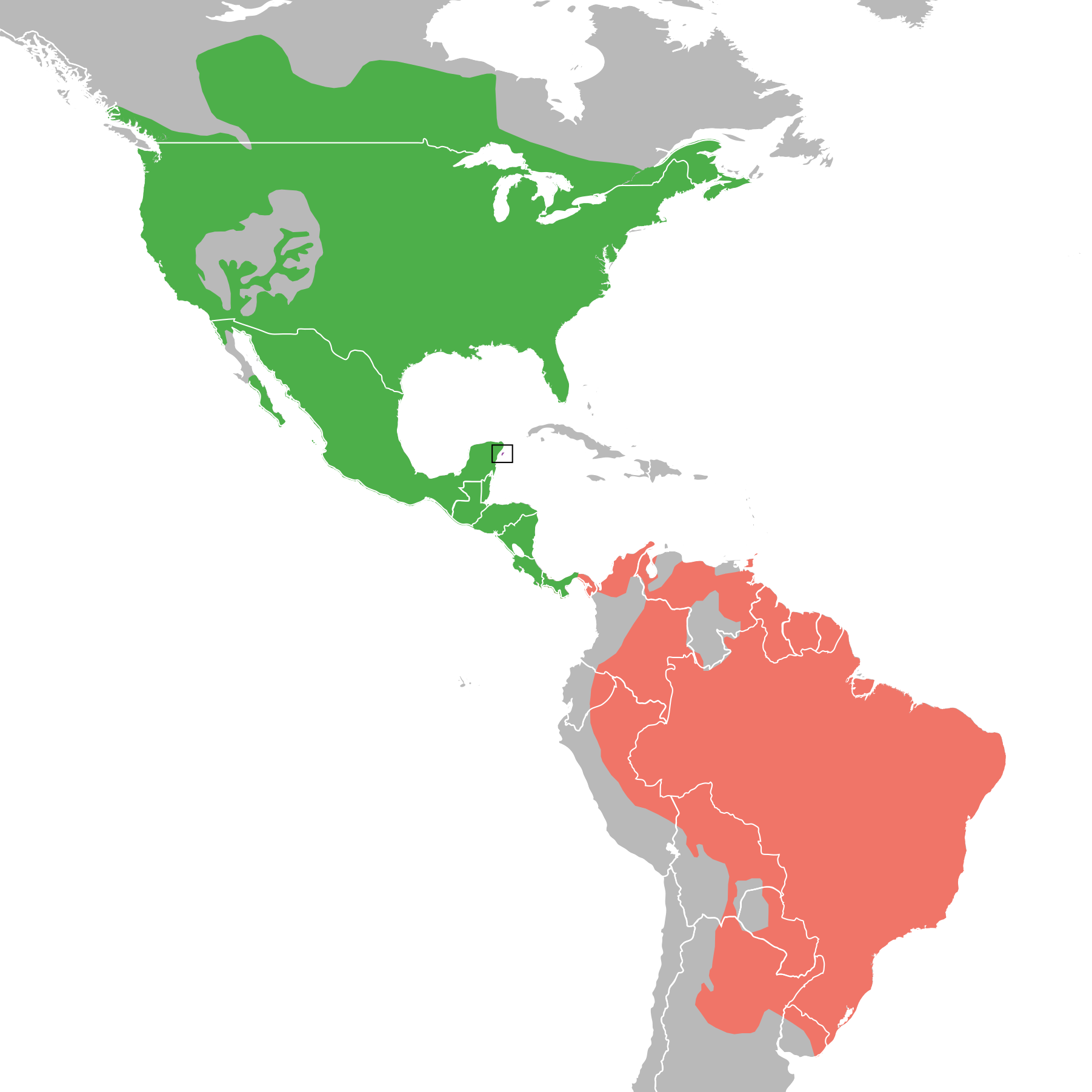
- Procyon distribution P. lotor in green, P. cancrivorus in red, P. pygmaeus in purple (in box); Excludes P. lotor introductions to Central Europe, the Caucasus Mountains, and Japan

= Procyon (genus) =

Procyon Temporal range: Pliocene–Recent, 4.9–0 Ma

Genus of carnivores

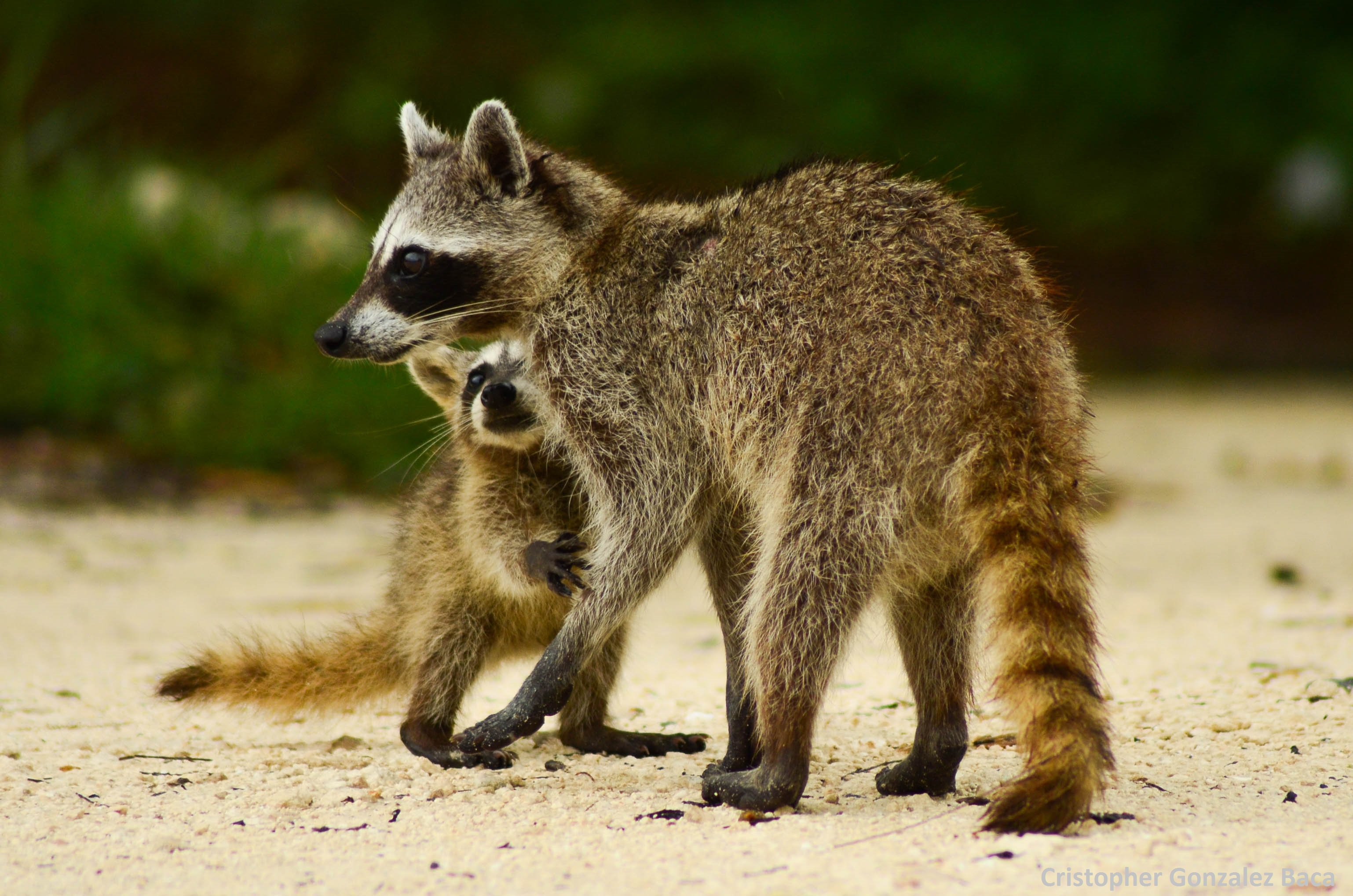
Cozumel raccoon (P. pygmaeus)

Procyon is a genus of nocturnal mammals comprising three species commonly known as raccoons in the family Procyonidae. The most familiar species, the common raccoon (P. lotor), is often known simply as "the" raccoon, as the two other raccoon species in the genus are native only to the tropics and are less well known. Genetic studies have shown that the closest relatives of raccoons are the ring-tailed cats and cacomistles of genus Bassariscus, from which they diverged about 10 million years ago.

== General attributes ==
Raccoons are unusual, for their thumbs (though not opposable) enable them to open many closed containers (such as garbage cans and doors). They are omnivores with a reputation for being clever and mischievous; their intelligence and dexterity equip them to survive in a wide range of environments and are one of the few medium-to-large-sized animals that have enlarged their range since human encroachment began (another is the coyote). Raccoon hindfeet are plantigrade similar to those of humans and bears. Raccoons are sometimes considered vermin or a nuisance. They have readily adapted to urban environments (compare urban opossums, skunks and foxes), scavenging garbage bins and other food sources.

Although there is some variation depending on species, raccoons range from 20–40 inches (51–102 cm) in length (including the tail) and weigh between 10 and 35 lb (4.5 and 15.9 kg). The raccoon's tail ranges from 8 to 16 inches (20 to 41 cm) in length. Male raccoons are generally larger than females. A baby raccoon is called a kit.

Raccoons can live up to 16 years in the wild, though most do not make it through their second year. A raccoon that survives past its youth will live an average of five years. Primary causes of mortality include humans (hunting, trapping, cars) and malnutrition.

== Species ==
There are three extant species of raccoon:

Image	Scientific name	Common name	Description	Distribution
	Procyon lotor	Raccoon, common raccoon, northern raccoon, racoon	Raccoons can live in the city or the wild. While not domesticated, they are—on rare occasion—kept as pets.	Southern Canada to Panama, and has been introduced to continental Europe and the Japanese archipelago
	P. cancrivorus	Crab-eating raccoon, southern raccoon	Based on genetic studies, the lineages of common and crab-eating raccoons are thought to have separated about 4.2 million years ago. Shorter fur and more gracile.	Costa Rica through most areas of South America east of the Andes down to northern Argentina and Uruguay.
	P. pygmaeus	Cozumel raccoon, pygmy raccoon	Smaller head and body than the common raccoon. Tail has yellow tint.	Cozumel, an island off the eastern coast of Mexico's Yucatán peninsula.

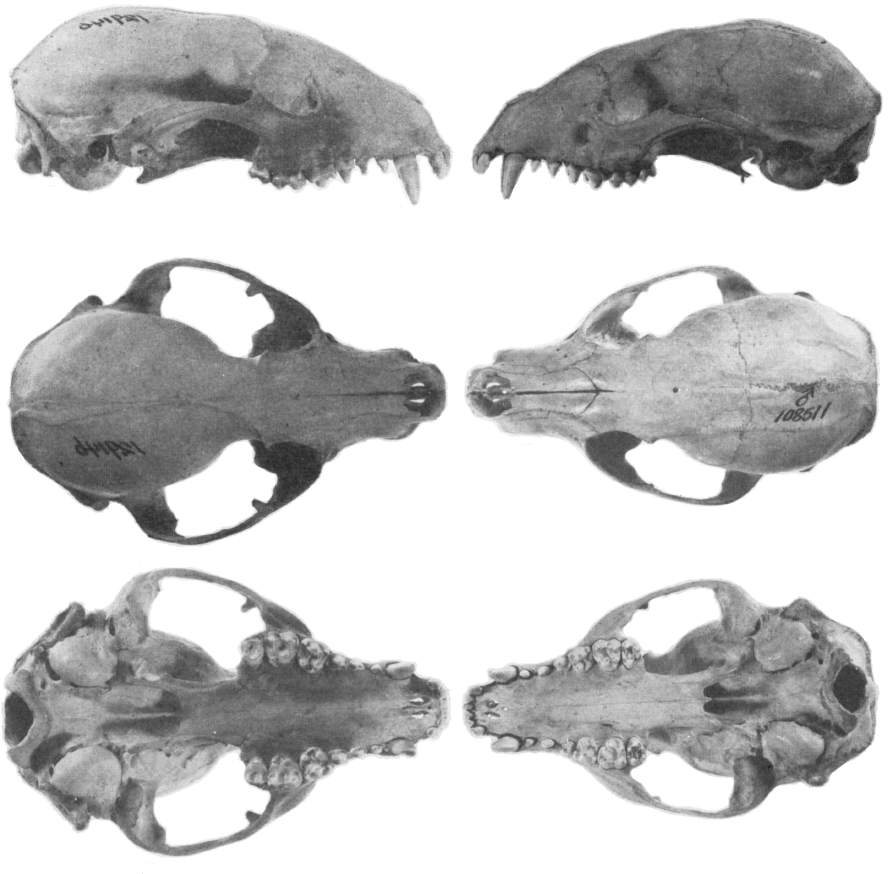
Common raccoon skull (left) and Cozumel raccoon skull (right)

Some raccoons once considered as separate species are now thought to be the same as or subspecies of the common raccoon, including the Barbados raccoon (P. gloveralleni), Nassau raccoon (P. maynardi), Guadeloupe raccoon (P. minor), and Tres Marias raccoon (P. insularis) (Helgen and Wilson 2005). Procyon brachyurus Wiegmann, 1837 was described from captive specimens; its identity is undeterminable as the remains of the two animals assigned to this taxon cannot be located and may have been lost.

== Nomenclature ==
The word "raccoon" is derived from the Algonquian word aroughcoune, "he who scratches with his hands". Spanish-speaking colonists similarly adopted their term, mapache, from mapachtli the Nahuatl word for the animal, meaning roughly "that which has hands".

The genus name, Procyon, comes from the Greek for "before the dog"; this term is also used for the star Procyon of the constellation Canis Minor.

Raccoons are today understood to have a relatively loose evolutionary relationship with bears, which was nonetheless seen as significant by the early taxonomists; Carl Linnaeus initially placed the raccoon in the genus Ursus. In many languages, the raccoon is named for its characteristic dousing behavior in conjunction with that language's term for "bear": Waschbär in German, mosómedve in Hungarian, vaskebjørn in Danish and Norwegian, tvättbjörn in Swedish, wasbeer in Dutch, pesukaru in Estonian and pesukarhu in Finnish, araiguma (アライグマ) in Japanese, orsetto lavatore in Italian, huànxióng (浣熊) in Chinese and mieshta mechka (миеща мечка) in Bulgarian all mean "washing bear". One exception is Russian, where raccoon is named yenot (енот) due to similarity between raccoon and genet furs. However, the full name of the common raccoon in Russian is also water-related: it is called yenot-poloskun (енот-полоскун), which means "rinsing raccoon".

In some cases, the "washing" descriptor is applied only to the common raccoon species: for example, in French the common raccoon is called raton laveur or "washing rat", while its Linnaean binomial is Procyon lotor or, roughly, "washing pre-dog". In contrast, the crab-eating raccoon is "little crab-catching rat" (raton crabier) and "crab-eating pre-dog" (Procyon cancrivorus) in French and Latin, respectively.

== See also ==
- List of procyonids – all species in the parent family Procyonidae
- Raccoon dog – an unrelated animal sometimes confused with raccoons
- Red panda

== General and cited references ==
- Helgen, K.M.; Wilson, D.E. (2003). "Taxonomic status and conservation relevance of the raccoons (Procyon spp.) of the West Indies". Journal of Zoology. 259. London: 69–76. doi:10.1017/S0952836902002972. S2CID 86210627.
- Helgen, K.M. & Wilson, D.E. 2005. A systematic and zoogeographic overview of the raccoons of Mexico and Central America. Pp. 219–234 in Sanchez-Cordero, V. & Medellin, R.A. (eds.). Contribuciones Mastozoologicas: en Homenaje a Bernardo Villa. Mexico City: Instituto de Biologia e Instituto de Ecologia, UNAM.
