= Bertram Glacier =

Glacier in Antarctica

Bertram Glacier (70°50′S 67°28′W) is a glacier, 15 nautical miles (28 km) long and 18 nautical miles (33 km) wide at its mouth, which flows west from the Dyer Plateau of Palmer Land into George VI Sound between Wade Point and Gurney Point.

It was discovered and first surveyed in 1936 by A. Stephenson, W.L.S. Fleming and Colin Bertram of the British Graham Land Expedition (BGLE) under John Rymill, and named by the UK Antarctic Place-Names Committee in 1954 for Bertram, a biologist of the BGLE, 1934–37, and a member of the discovery party, who in 1949 became director of the Scott Polar Research Institute, Cambridge.
