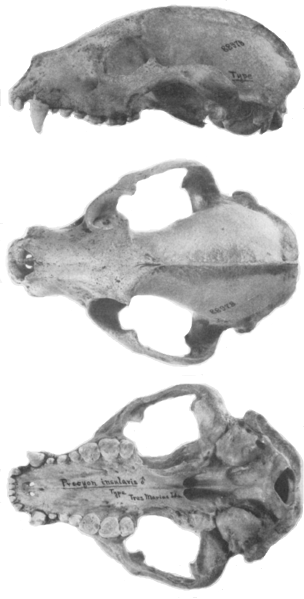

Scientific classification
- Kingdom: Animalia
- Phylum: Chordata
- Class: Mammalia
- Order: Carnivora
- Family: Procyonidae
- Genus: Procyon
- Species: P. lotor
- Subspecies: P. l. maynardi

Trinomial name
- Procyon lotor maynardi Bangs, 1898

= Bahamian raccoon =

Subspecies of carnivore

The Bahamian raccoon (Procyon lotor maynardi), also called the Bahama raccoon or Bahamas raccoon, is a population of the common raccoon found on several islands in The Bahamas. It was long thought to be an endemic raccoon subspecies limited to New Providence island, described scientifically as Procyon lotor maynardi, named after Charles Johnson Maynard, an American naturalist. However, modern research has shown that raccoons were introduced to the Bahamas from Florida and are not a genetically distinct subspecies. Consequently, the Bahamian raccoon is now considered an invasive species in the archipelago rather than a native endemic.

== Classification and Taxonomy ==
Naturalists originally classified the Bahamian raccoon as a distinct species of raccoon. American zoologist Outram Bangs initially described it in 1898 as a new species (later treated as a subspecies) based on an immature specimen with a small skull and other perceived differences. For much of the 20th century, Procyon maynardi was recognized as an endemic raccoon on New Providence and given conservation status as such.

Recent genetic evidence has since overturned this classification. Multiple studies analyzed DNA from West Indian raccoons and found that the Bahamian raccoon is conspecific with the widespread North American raccoon (Procyon lotor). Their results indicated that raccoons in The Bahamas originated from recent human-mediated translocations rather than long-term isolation. Additionally, it was found Bahamian raccoons stem from at least two introduction events from Florida (see Genetic Analysis below).

Today, “Procyon lotor maynardi” is not considered a valid endemic subspecies, but simply an introduced population of P. lotor. The name is sometimes used informally, but taxonomically the Bahamian raccoons are grouped with mainland raccoons.

== Description ==
In appearance, the Bahamian raccoon is very similar to other common raccoons, with no unique morphological traits beyond normal variation. Early descriptions noted that the skull from New Providence raccoons seemed small with a narrow palate and light dentition, which Bangs and Goldman had cited as distinguishing feature However, examination of a larger series of specimens revealed that those traits fall within the range of individual variation found in mainland raccoons. There are no consistent features of insular dwarfism, such is the case with the Cozumel raccoon (Procyon pygmaeus.) Adult Bahamian raccoons reach a size and weight comparable to raccoons in Florida and the southeastern United States.

== Genetic Analysis ==
Molecular studies have confirmed that the Bahamian raccoon is not an endemic subspecies but an introduced population of Procyon lotor. Genetic analyses have shown that raccoons in The Bahamas share recent ancestry with mainland populations, particularly from Florida, rather than representing a distinct taxon. Historical records support this, documenting human-mediated introductions from the 18th century onward.

DNA sequencing has linked Bahamian raccoons to specific regions of Florida. Raccoons on New Providence were found to be closely related to southern Florida and Florida Keys populations, while those on the Abaco Islands trace to central Florida. Additional studies on Caribbean raccoons confirm that populations in the region, including those in Guadeloupe and Martinique, originate from North America rather than evolving separately.

Previously classified as an endangered endemic, the Bahamian raccoon has been removed from conservation priority lists due to its confirmed invasive status. This misidentification led to past conservation efforts aimed at protecting what was ultimately a non-native species. The recognition of its true origins has shifted focus toward managing its impact on native ecosystems rather than its preservation.

== Conservation and Management ==
Because of the taxonomic change and demonstrated invasive status of the Bahamian raccoon, conservation policy in The Bahamas has shifted from protection to control of this species. Once thought to be an endemic endangered mammal, the raccoon is now officially recognized as an invasive alien species by Bahamian officials.

The Bahamas Environment, Science and Technology (BEST) Commission acknowledged as early as 2003 that the raccoon should be managed as an invasive species, not as a subject of conservation concern. This was a direct response to the findings of Helgen's initial research in 2003. The 2013 Bahamas National Invasive Species Strategy explicitly identified the raccoon as a target for control and eradication. According to this strategy, raccoon populations on New Providence and Grand Bahama – where they have existed the longest – should be controlled and prevented from growing further. Any raccoons found on other islands such as Abaco should be eradicated to stop spread.

== See also ==
- Island raccoon
