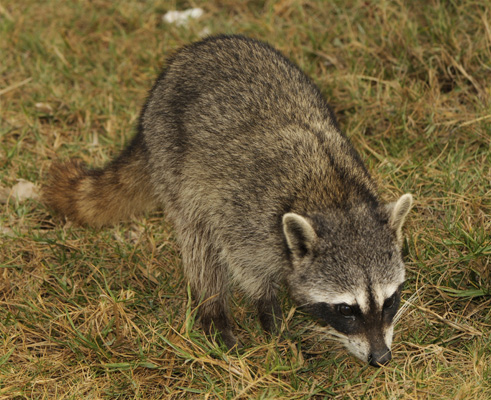

Conservation status
- Critically Endangered (IUCN 3.1)

Scientific classification
- Kingdom: Animalia
- Phylum: Chordata
- Class: Mammalia
- Order: Carnivora
- Family: Procyonidae
- Genus: Procyon
- Species: P. pygmaeus

Binomial name
- Procyon pygmaeus Merriam, 1901
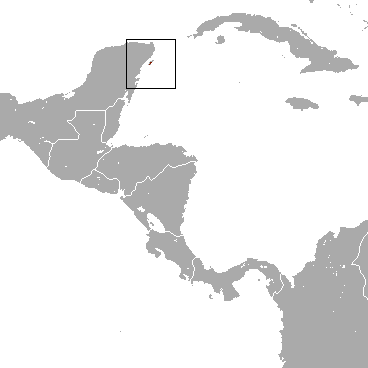
- Cozumel raccoon range

= Cozumel raccoon =

Species of critically endangered raccoon

The Cozumel raccoon (Procyon pygmaeus) is a critically endangered species of island raccoon endemic on Cozumel Island off the coast of the Yucatan Peninsula, Mexico. It is sometimes also called the pygmy raccoon, dwarf raccoon, Cozumel Island raccoon, and Cozumel raccoon bear.

== Classification ==
Clinton Hart Merriam first described the Cozumel raccoon as morphologically distinctive from its mainland relative, the common raccoon subspecies Procyon lotor hernandezii, in 1901. Since then, other scientists have generally agreed with Merriam's assessment, especially Kristofer Helgen and Don E. Wilson, who have dismissed this classification for the other four island raccoons in their studies in 2003 and 2005. Therefore, the Cozumel raccoon was listed as the only distinct species of the genus Procyon besides the common raccoon and the crab-eating raccoon in the third edition of Mammal Species of the World. An archeological study showed that Maya from Cozumel used raccoons of reduced stature, which suggests that the size reduction of this raccoon is not a recent phenomenon.

No true fossils of the species are known, although skeletons have been found at some archeological sites on the island. Cozumel island itself separated from the mainland during the late Pleistocene, so that the species is unlikely to be older than 122,000 years. Data from molecular clock studies implies a divergence date from the common raccoon of anywhere between 26,000 and 69,000 years ago.

== Description ==
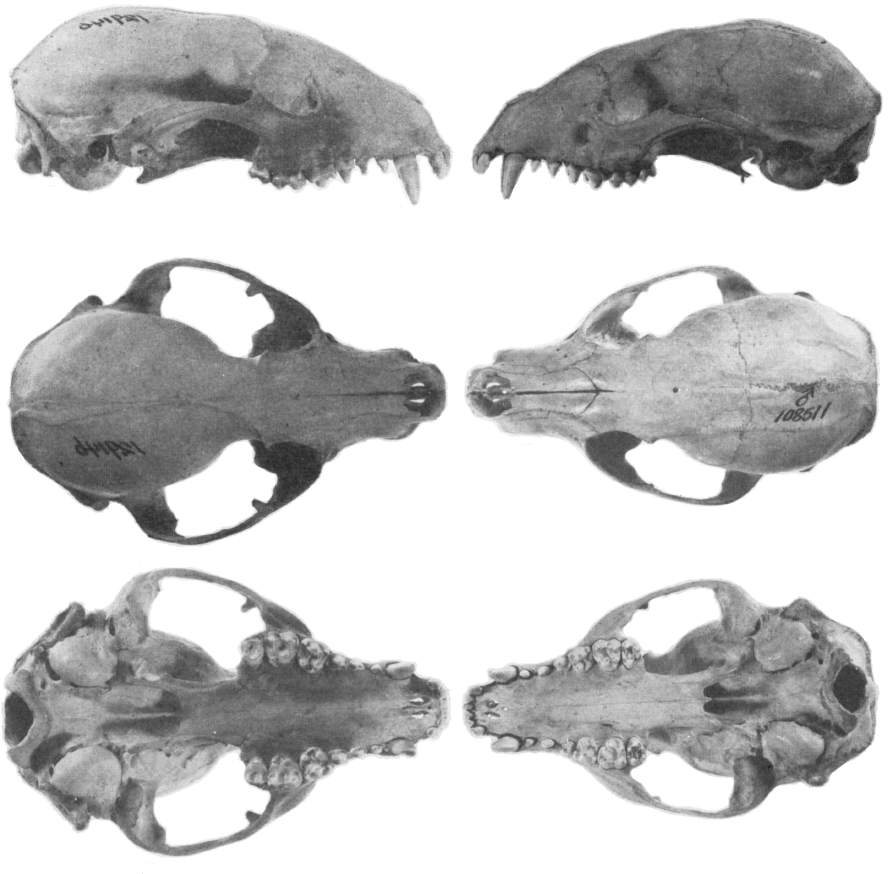
Common raccoon skull (left) and Cozumel raccoon skull (right)

Merriam described the Cozumel raccoon as being markedly smaller, both externally and cranially and easy to distinguish from the common raccoon because of its "broad black throat band and golden yellow tail, short posteriorly expanded and rounded nasals and peculiarities of the teeth". Its reduced teeth point to a long period of isolation.

Apart from its smaller size and more rounded snout, the Cozumel raccoon is similar in appearance to the common raccoon. The fur over the upper body is buff-grey ticked with occasional black hairs, while the underparts and legs are pale buff in color. The top of the head lacks the buff tinge of the rest of the body, and has a grizzled grey coloration, contrasting with the white fur of the muzzle and chin, and with the black "mask" pattern around the eyes. A line of brownish-grey fur runs down the middle of the snout, joining the "mask" patterns on either side. The tail is yellowish, with six or seven black or brown rings that become fainter on the underside. In males, the scruff of the neck has a patch of relatively bright, orange fur.

Adults range from 58 to 82 centimeters (23 to 32 in) in total length, including the 23 to 26 centimeters (9.1 to 10.2 in) tail, and weigh between 3 and 4 kilograms (6.6 and 8.8 lb). This represents an example of insular dwarfism, and the animals are, on average, about 18% shorter and 45% lighter than the subspecies of common raccoon found on the local mainland, P. lotor hernandezii. Cozumel raccoons also exhibit sexual dimorphism, with the males being around 20% heavier than the females.

== Distribution and habitat ==
The Cozumel raccoon is endemic to Cozumel Island, an island around 478 square kilometers (185 sq mi) in area, lying off the east coast of the Yucatan Peninsula in Mexico. It is one of two raccoon species in Mexico, the other being the common raccoon (Procyon lotor), and is the only raccoon species present on Cozumel Island. Cozumel Island supports several other carnivores, including the dwarf coati (Nasua narica nelsoni) and dwarf gray fox (Urocyon sp.). Islands usually lack terrestrial mammals, especially carnivores, making the Cozumel raccoon and the others unique.

On the island, the raccoon inhabits a range of habitats, but is primarily limited to the mangrove forests and sandy wetlands in the northwest tip of the island. However, it has also been captured in semi-evergreen forests and agricultural lands surrounding these preferred habitats., and in the Punta Sur ecological park at the south end of the island.

A study on home range and activity patterns of the Cozumel raccoon found that individuals exhibit relatively small home ranges compared to mainland raccoons. Males maintain larger territories than females, and the species exhibits primarily nocturnal behavior, with peak activity occurring between sunset and 4:00 AM. Their movements are influenced by habitat quality and the presence of anthropogenic disturbances.

== Behavior ==
Relatively little is known about the group size of the raccoons. They are primarily nocturnal and solitary animals, but may sometimes form family groups possibly consisting of the mother and cubs. They have been observed making balls out of rolled paper and using them as toys. This behavior is passed between individuals through social learning within family groups.

The raccoons live in densities of about 17–27 individuals per km^{2}, and inhabit home ranges of around 67 hectares (170 acres) on average. However, individuals do not appear to defend territories to any great extent, and their close relative, the common raccoon, can exist at very high densities when food is abundant. Although there have been no detailed studies of their reproductive habits, females seem to give birth primarily between November and January, possibly with a second litter during the summer months.

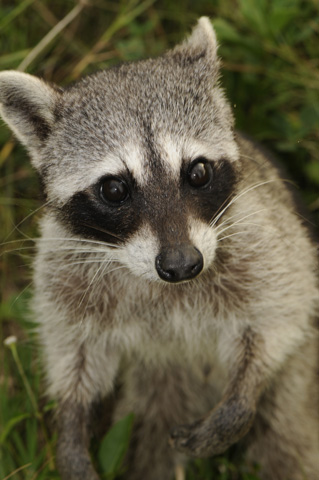
Cozumel raccoon

== Diet ==
The habitat specificity of Cozumel raccoons is in large part due to the type of foods they consume. They are a generalist omnivore with an overall diet consisting of crabs, fruit, frogs, lizards, and insects. Crabs make up between 44% and 50% of the Cozumel raccoon's diet, with Cardisoma guanhumi and Coenobita clypeatus being the most frequently consumed. Seasonal variations influence diet composition. During the wet season, crabs are more active and readily available, leading to increased consumption. In contrast, the dry season sees a higher intake of fruits such as sapodilla and snowberries due to their greater abundance. The diet of the Cozumel raccoon reflects its habitat specificity, with a strong preference for coastal and mangrove areas where its primary food sources are found.

Anthropogenic food sources, such as discarded human food waste, are also commonly consumed by Cozumel Raccoons. There are concerns that increasing human-wildlife interactions, particularly in tourist areas, may lead to greater dependence on human-derived food in the future.

== Morphological specializations ==
It was at one point thought that the Cozumel raccoon was simply part of the Mexican raccoon subspecies of common raccoon. A large amount of research has been performed to determine whether the Cozumel raccoon is indeed a separate species from the common raccoon. Cuaron et al. (2004) reported that research conducted by many different scholars concludes that they are separate species. Body size and cranium size have been reported to be smaller in P. pygmaeus, hence the name pygmy. Other morphological differences include a broad black throat band, golden yellow tail and reduced teeth; "these and other characteristics point to a long period of isolation".

== Conservation status ==
According to the IUCN Red List, this pygmy raccoons are critically endangered. As of the 2016 IUCN assessment, it was determined that the Cozumel raccoon population is in continuous decline and was estimated there are only around 192 mature individuals left in the world. In Mexico, pygmy raccoons are listed as En Peligro de Extinción (Threatened with Extinction) by SEMARNAT and are protected by law. The pygmy raccoon's small geographic range contributes to its risk of extinction. Island carnivores at the top of the food chain often become extinct soon after the arrival of humans. The main danger to the Cozumel raccoon is development of Cozumel island due to the tourism industry. Because the pygmy raccoons are mainly found in coastal and mangrove ecosystems on the west side of the island, where land is desired by developers for beach clubs and resorts, the effects of habitat loss are especially severe.

=== Threats ===
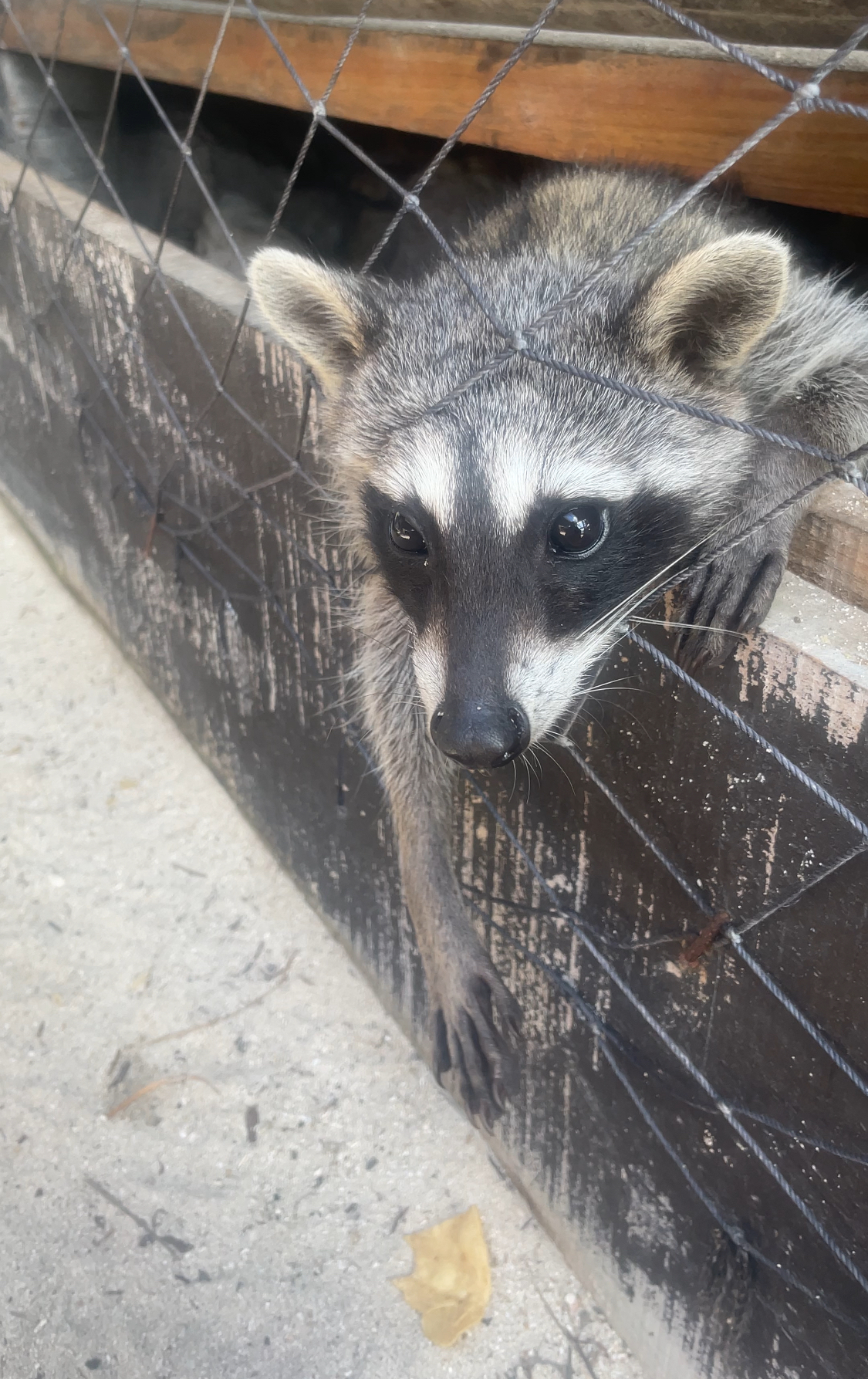
A Cozumel raccoon at a beach club reaching for a tortilla chip thrown to it by a tourist

Habitat destruction driven by tourism development is the primary threat to Cozumel raccoons. The increasing number of visitors and cruise ship arrivals has led to deforestation, road expansion, and habitat fragmentation, particularly affecting the island's mangrove and coastal ecosystems. Cozumel raccoons are increasingly drawn to human settlements, where they scavenge for food from tourist areas, restaurants, and waste disposal sites. While this may temporarily supplement their diet, reliance on human food exposes them to contaminants and alters natural foraging behaviors, increasing human-wildlife conflicts. Additionally, the raccoon faces genetic bottlenecks, leading to low genetic diversity and increasing its susceptibility to environmental changes and diseases.

Hurricanes have also played a significant role in the decline of the Cozumel raccoon population. The impact of climate change and more frequent hurricanes further exacerbate these challenges. Studies have shown that after major storms, the raccoon's density can decline by up to 60% in affected areas. Juvenile Cozumel raccoons are most at risk of being killed during hurricanes, as they are often crushed by falling debris. Hurricane Gilbert in 1988 was a significant such event for the species, displacing them completely off Passion Island and confined them to solely the island of Cozumel. Other notable hurricanes that affected the Cozumel raccoon species include Roxanne in 1995 and Wilma in 2005.

Newer threats to their survival that have been researched in recent years are diseases and parasites. Cozumel has a population of feral cats and domestic cats and dogs that can transmit diseases to the raccoons. On average, there are about two different parasite species present in each host. That is not overall abundance, but simply the absolute number of species found. Some captured raccoons had developed antibodies to certain diseases. Cats are only newly introduced on the island due to humans bringing them as pets. Recent studies have also indicated genetic introgression from mainland raccoon species (Procyon lotor), which could dilute the genetic uniqueness of the endemic Cozumel raccoon. This genetic mixing may result from human-facilitated introductions.

=== Conservation actions ===
Conservationists advocate for expanding protected areas, particularly in the mangrove and coastal forests, which are the raccoon's primary habitat. The "Área de Protección de Flora y Fauna de la Isla Cozumel" covers some raccoon habitats, but additional land protections are needed. Minimizing human-wildlife interaction, enforcing waste management protocols, and educating tourists about the importance of avoiding feeding wildlife are essential steps toward reducing negative human impacts.

Another method that could help to restore the populations is captive breeding techniques. If they willingly reproduce in captivity as the common raccoons do, it could be used successfully. Additionally, the arrival of pets, especially feral cats, brought more diseases and parasites that are having a significant effect on the raccoons. The best method of reducing these impacts is to remove as many feral cats as possible. For any conservation action to be successful, conservation personnel will need to find a way to compromise with the tourism industry to save the Cozumel raccoons.

Glatston also urged researchers to continue examining the species to assure that the pygmy is a distinct species from its mainland sister taxon.
