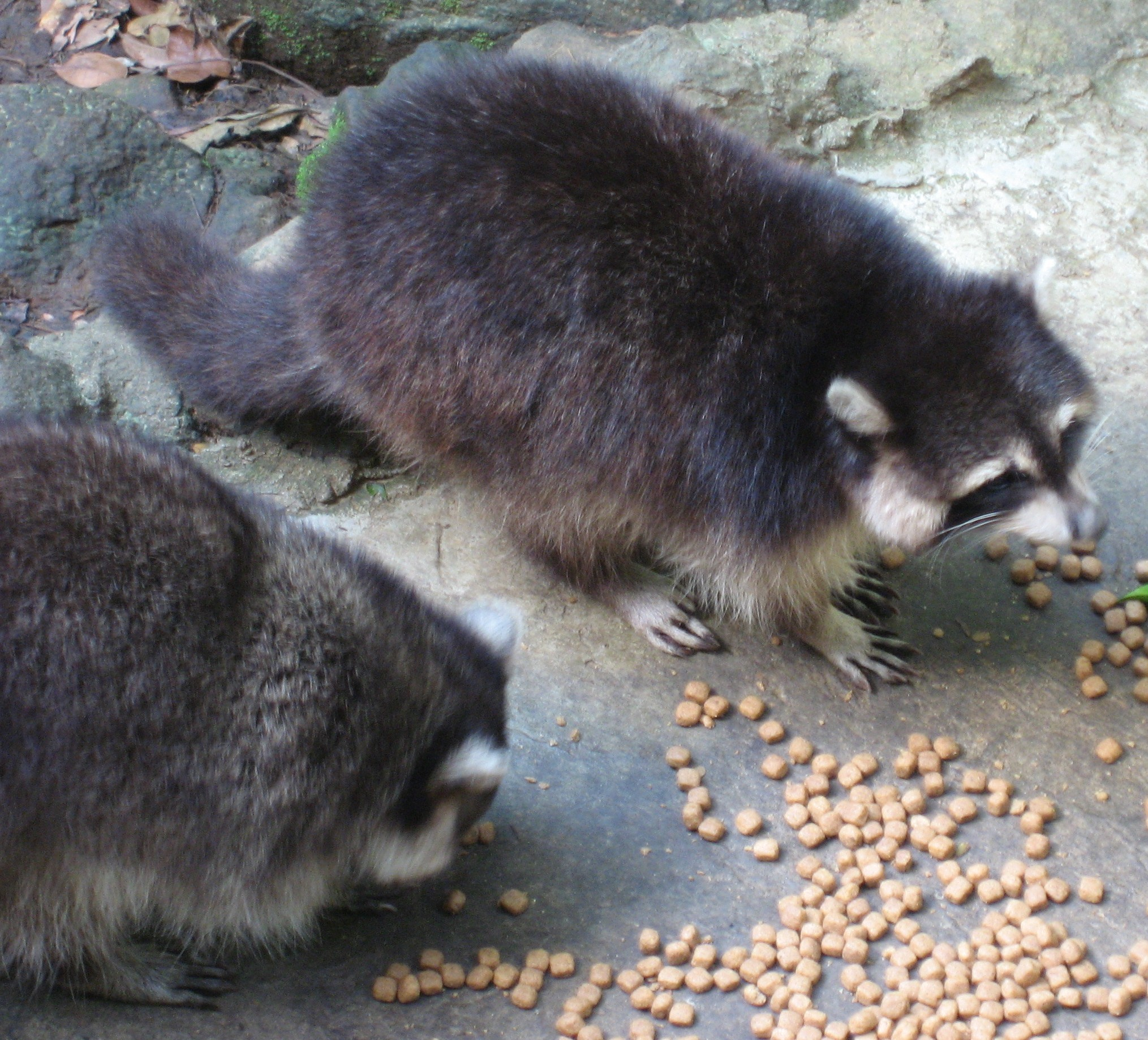

Scientific classification
- Kingdom: Animalia
- Phylum: Chordata
- Class: Mammalia
- Order: Carnivora
- Family: Procyonidae
- Genus: Procyon
- Species: P. lotor
- Subspecies: P. l. minor

Trinomial name
- Procyon lotor minor Miller, 1911

= Guadeloupe raccoon =

Subspecies of carnivore

The Guadeloupe raccoon is an introduced population of the common raccoon (Procyon lotor) found on the two main islands of Guadeloupe, Basse-Terre Island and Grande-Terre, in the Lesser Antilles. It was historically regarded as an endemic species, Procyon minor, and later as the subspecies Procyon lotor minor.

== Classification ==
The Guadeloupe population was initially described by Gerrit Smith Miller Jr. in 1911 as the distinct species Procyon minor. During the twentieth century, it was generally regarded as an endemic to Guadeloupe, although its taxonomic acceptance varied between recognition as the species P. minor and placement as a subspecies of Procyon lotor. Molecular and chromosomal analyses published in 1999 found that the Guadeloupe population belongs within P. lotor, rather than representing a distinct endemic species. Similar endemic species status had historically been assigned to the Bahamian raccoon and the Barbados raccoon.

Subsequent research found that the Guadeloupe population is derived from raccoons from the contented United States, and was introduced by humans. The population is consequently regarded as an invasive alien population of common raccoons rather than a species or subspecies endemic to Guadeloupe.

== Description ==
Historical descriptions characterized Guadeloupe raccoons as relatively small, with a delicate skull, dark gray coat, and a slight ocher coloration around the neck and shoulders. These characteristics were formerly used in support of recognizing taxonomic distinction of P. minor or P. lotor minor. Later comparisons of morphology and genetic evidence, however, did not support recognition of the Guadeloupe population as a species or a subspecies.

== Ecology ==
The Guadeloupe raccoon was formerly considered a species of conservation concern. Under the name Procyon minor, it was classified as Endangered on the 1996 IUCN Red List.

A 2026 camera-trap study of Guadeloupe's tropical forests explicitly classified raccoons among the island's invasive mammal species. Raccoons were detected in multiple forest types, with relative abundance significantly lower in tropical rainforest than in dry or flooded forest. The study identified invasive mammals as an important component of Guadeloupe's terrestrial vertebrate communities and recommended strengthened monitoring and management of invasive mammals to protect native and endemic fauna.

Historically, the raccoon was an important conservation symbol in Guadeloupe. It was used as the emblem of the former Parc naturel de Guadeloupe beginning in the 1970s and was subsequently adopted as an emblematic species of Guadeloupe National Park following the park's creation in 1989. The raccoon was formerly displayed on park vehicles, boats, communications materials, merchandise, trail markers, and staff uniforms. Its use as a flagship species was also documented in the scientific literature.
