= Ulf Hohmann =

German ethologist (born 1963)

- Born: July 9, 1963 (age 63); Stuttgart, West Germany
- Citizenship: Germany
- Education: University of Tübingen; University of Kiel; University of Göttingen
- Known for: Social behavior of raccoons Distribution of the raccoon in Germany
- Scientific career
- Fields: Zoology (Ethology)
- Workplaces: Society for wildlife ecology and conservation e.V. Research institute for forest ecology and forestry Rhineland-Palatinate
- Doctoral advisor: Antal Festetics
- Notable students: Frank-Uwe Michler

Ulf Hohmann (born 9 July 1963, in Stuttgart) is a German ethologist, whose studies about the raccoon have played a significant role in the understanding of its social behavior and its distribution in Germany.

== Biography ==
Studying at the universities University of Tübingen and University of Kiel, Ulf Hohmann completed his diploma of Biology in 1992. After the submission of his dissertation to Antal Festetics at the forestal faculty of the University of Göttingen in 1998, he was the chairperson of the Gesellschaft für Wildökologie und Naturschutz e.V. (Society for wildlife ecology and conservation e.V.). In this role, he appeared in the media as expert for the increasing urbanisation of animals. At the moment (July 2008), he works for the Forschungsanstalt für Waldökologie und Forstwirtschaft Rheinland-Pfalz (Research institute for forest ecology and forestry Rhineland-Palatinate) located in Trippstadt.

== Research ==
Within the scope of his dissertation, Ulf Hohmann and several scientific assistants carried out the first systematic study of the German raccoon population from 1992 to 1998. The telemetric measurement of the movement patterns of the raccoons living in the Lower Saxony low mountain range Solling yielded the result that the social behavior of raccoons is gender-specific and that they often live together in small, loose groups instead of being loners like previously thought. Stanley D. Gehrt arrived at the same conclusion in his study done in Texas in 1994 one year after Hohmann's initial query to Gehrt's doctoral adviser and raccoon expert Erik Fritzell about his discoveries. (→ Social behavior of raccoons)

The study was supplemented with the observation of the behavior of several raised and subsequently released raccoon kits. This work, started by the graduand Franziska Kalz in 1995, was accompanied by the wildlife photographer Ingo Bartussek since spring 1996. Beginning in 1999, after the submission of his dissertation, Ulf Hohmann carried out the first study of urban raccoons outside of North America in the Hessian small town Bad Karlshafen. In 2001, Ulf Hohmann published the monograph Der Waschbär (The raccoon), giving a thorough overview of appearance and behavior of the species and the results of his studies in it. Besides numerous photos of Ingo Bartussek, the book also contains a chapter about raising raccoon kits written by the veterinarian Bernhard Böer.

Working now for the Forschungsanstalt für Waldökologie und Forstwirtschaft Rheinland-Pfalz, Ulf Hohmann has recently concentrated on the research of boars, mainly of those living in the Palatinate Forest. His research on raccoons has been continued by Frank-Uwe Michler, who first worked together with Hohmann for his diploma in a study of urban raccoons in Kassel from 2001 to 2002. Since March 2006, Frank-Uwe Michler is the leader of the first study of the range and behavior of the raccoons living in the eastern parts of Germany in the Müritz National Park.

== Publications ==
- Hohmann, Ulf; Bartussek, Ingo; Böer, Bernhard (2001). Der Waschbär (in German). Reutlingen, Germany: Oertel+Spörer. ISBN 978-3-88627-301-0.
- Hohmann, Ulf (1998). "Untersuchungen zur Raumnutzung des Waschbären (Procyon lotor) im Solling, Südniedersachsen, unter besonderer Berücksichtigung des Sozialverhaltens". (Dissertation in German with a summary in English at the University of Göttingen; translation of the title: A Study of Raccoon (Procyon lotor) Space Utilization in Southern Lower Saxony, Germany, with Respect to Social Behaviour)
- Hohmann, Ulf (1992). "Untersuchung zur raumzeitlichen Habitatnutzung des Mäusebussards (Buteo buteo) in der Eider-Treene-Sorge-Niederung". (Diploma thesis in German at the University of Kiel; translation of the title: A Study on Habitat Use with Respect to Spatial and Temporal Patterns by the Common Buzzard (Buteo buteo) in the Eider-Treene-Sorge-Lowlands)
