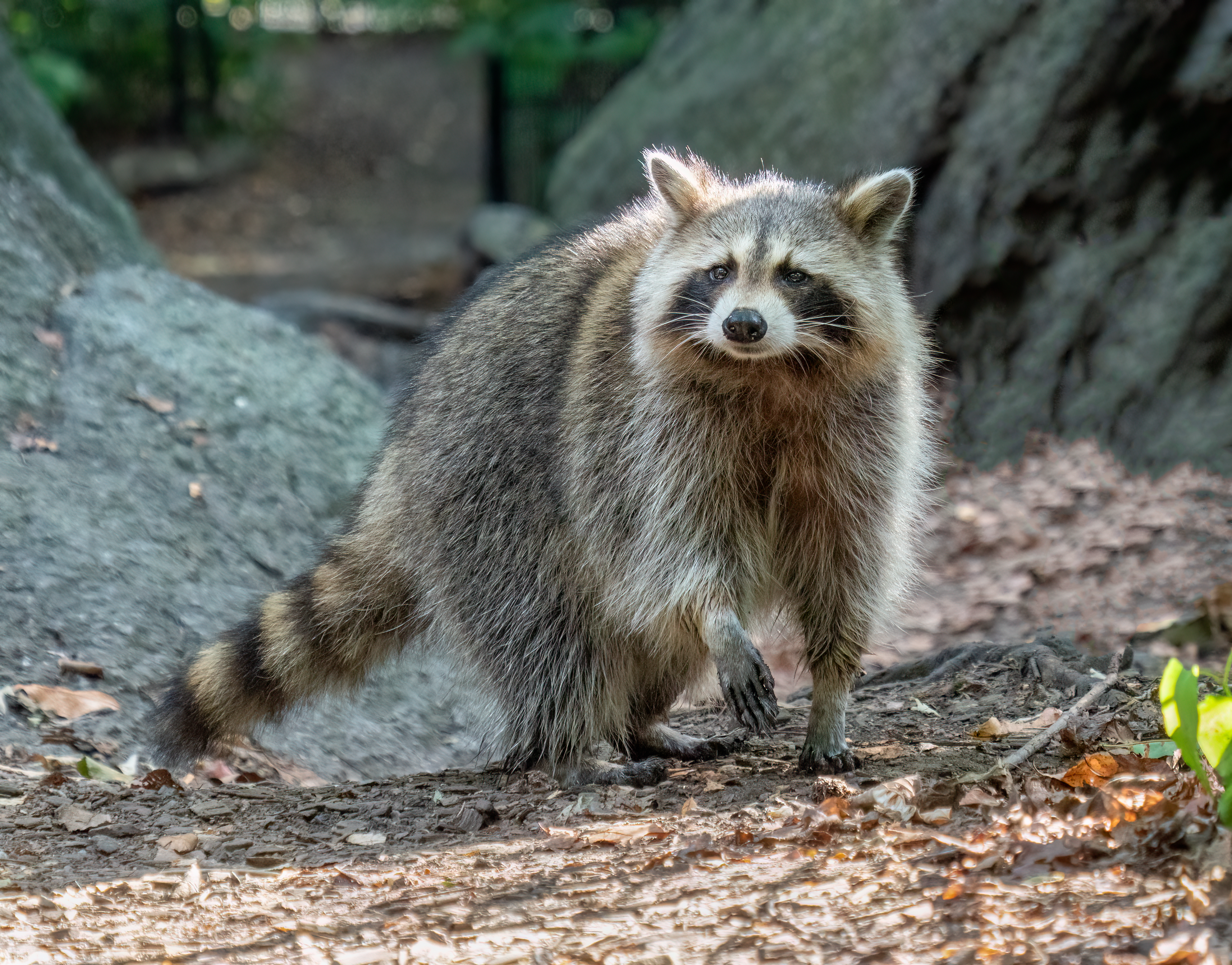
- Eastern raccoon (P. l. lotor), Central Park in New York City

Conservation status
- Least Concern (IUCN 3.1)

- Secure (NatureServe)

Scientific classification
- Kingdom: Animalia
- Phylum: Chordata
- Class: Mammalia
- Order: Carnivora
- Family: Procyonidae
- Genus: Procyon
- Species: P. lotor

Binomial name
- Procyon lotor (Linnaeus, 1758)
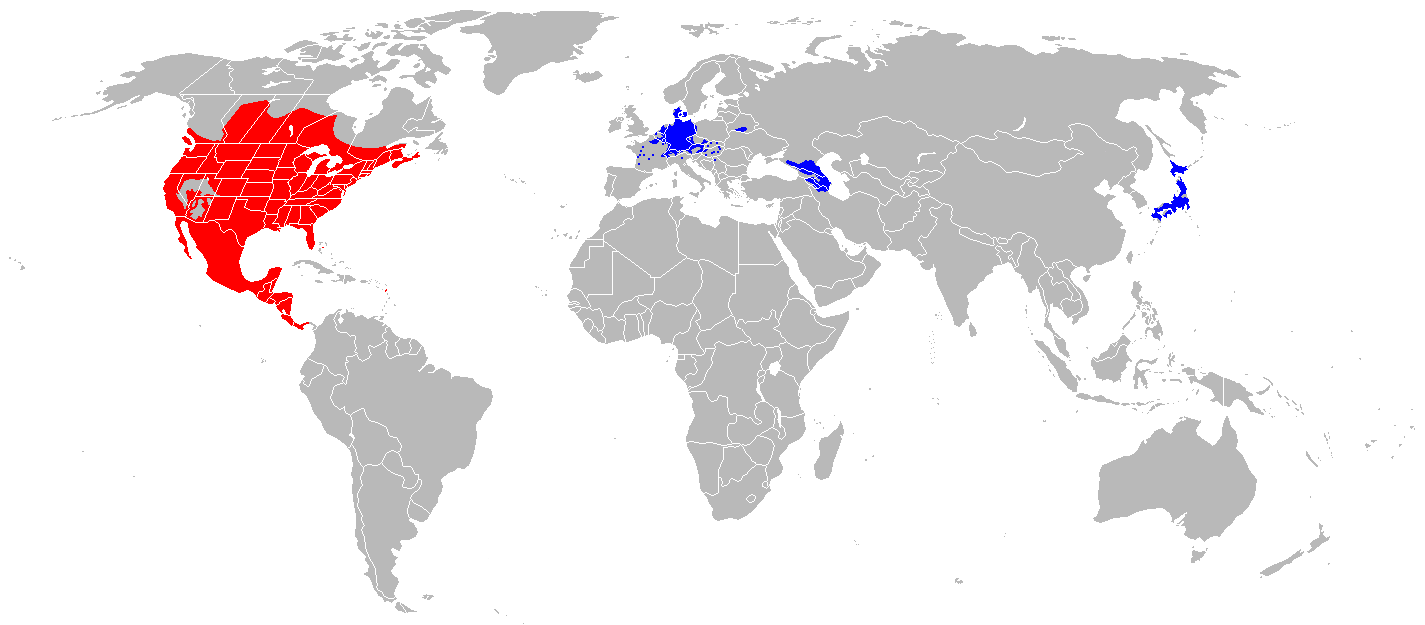
- Native range in red, introduced range in blue

Synonyms
- Ursus cauda elongata Linnaeus, 1740; Ursus lotor Linnaeus, 1758

= Raccoon =

Raccoon Temporal range: Pliocene–present

Medium-sized mammal native to North America

The raccoon (/rəˈkuːn/ or US: /ræˈkuːn/, Procyon lotor), sometimes called the North American, northern or common raccoon (also spelled racoon) to distinguish it from other species of raccoon, is a mammal native to North America. It is the largest of the procyonid family, having a body length of 40 to 70 cm (16 to 28 in), and a body weight of 5 to 26 kg (11 to 57 lb). Its grayish coat mostly consists of dense underfur, which insulates it against cold weather. The animal's most distinctive features include its extremely dexterous front paws, its facial mask, and its ringed tail, which are common themes in the mythologies of the Indigenous peoples of the Americas surrounding the species. The raccoon is noted for its intelligence, and studies show that it can remember the solution to tasks for at least three years. It is usually nocturnal and omnivorous, eating about 40% invertebrates, 33% plants, and 27% vertebrates.

The original habitats of the raccoon are deciduous and mixed forests. Still, due to their adaptability, they have extended their range to mountainous areas, coastal marshes, and urban areas, where some homeowners consider them to be pests. As a result of escapes and deliberate introductions in the mid-20th century, raccoons are now also distributed across central Europe, the Caucasus, and Japan. In Europe, the raccoon has been included on the list of Invasive Alien Species of Union Concern since 2016. This implies that this species cannot be imported, bred, transported, commercialized, or intentionally released into the environment in the whole of the European Union.

Though raccoons were previously thought to be generally solitary, there is now evidence that they engage in sex-specific social behavior. Related females often share a common area, while unrelated males live together in groups of up to four raccoons to maintain their positions against foreign males during the mating season and against other potential invaders. Home range sizes vary anywhere from 3 ha (7.4 acres) for females in cities, to 5,000 ha (50 km^{2}; 19 sq mi) for males in prairies. After a gestation of about 65 days, two to five young known as "kits" are born in spring. The kits are subsequently raised by their mother until dispersal in late fall. Although captive raccoons have been known to live over 20 years, their life expectancy in the wild is only 1.8 to 3.1 years. In many areas, hunting and vehicular injury are the two most common causes of death.

== Etymology ==
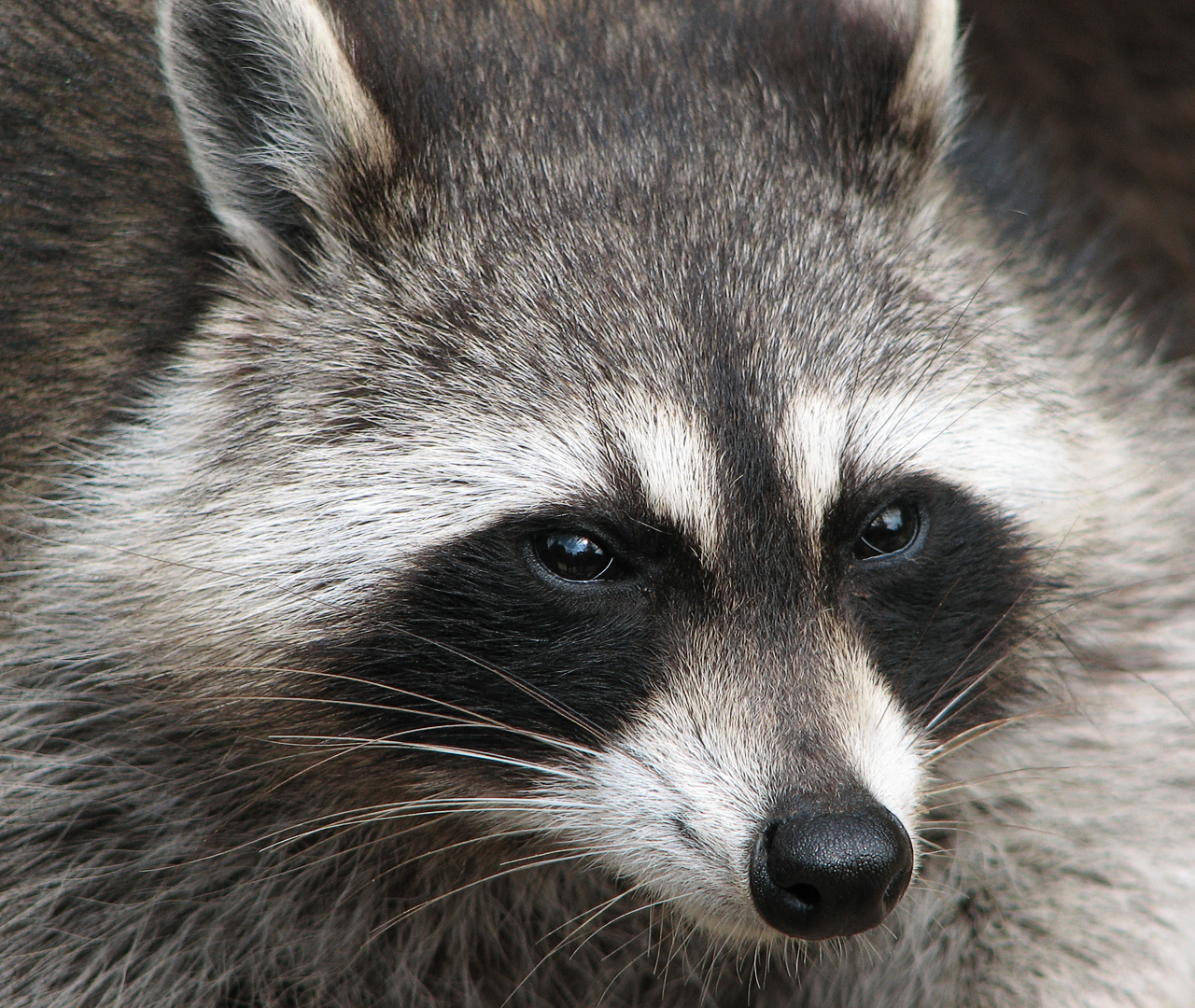
The mask of a raccoon is often interrupted by a brown-black streak that extends from forehead to nose.

Names for the species include the common raccoon, North American raccoon, and northern raccoon. In various North American native languages, the reference to the animal's manual dexterity, or use of its hands, is the source for the names. The word raccoon was adopted into English from the native Powhatan term meaning 'animal that scratches with its hands', as used in the Colony of Virginia. It was recorded on John Smith's list of Powhatan words as aroughcun, and on that of William Strachey as arathkone. It has also been identified as a reflex of a Proto-Algonquian root *ahrah-koon-em, meaning '[the] one who rubs, scrubs and scratches with its hands'. The word is sometimes spelled as racoon.

In Spanish, the raccoon is called mapache, derived from the Nahuatl mapachtli of the Aztecs, meaning '[the] one who takes everything in its hands'.

The taxonomic name of the raccoon is Procyon lotor. The genus name, Procyon, derived from the Greek προ- (pro) 'before' and κύων (cyon) 'dog', was first given to the genus by Gottlieb Conrad Christian Storr in 1780. The full name Procyon lotor means, in Latin, 'before-dog washer'. The animal's observed habit of "washing" or "dousing" (see below) is the source of its name in other languages. For example, the French raton laveur means 'washing rat'.

The colloquial abbreviation coon is used in words like coonskin for fur clothing and in phrases like old coon as a self-designation of trappers. In the 1830s, the United States Whig Party used the raccoon as an emblem, causing them to be pejoratively known as "coons" by their political opponents. Viewed by these opponents as too sympathetic to African-Americans, the term soon became an ethnic slur, especially in use between 1880 and 1920 (see coon song). The term is still considered offensive. Dogs bred to hunt raccoons are called coonhound and coon dog. Due to having a habit of eating human garbage in urban environments, raccoons are also colloquially known as "trash pandas".

== Taxonomy ==
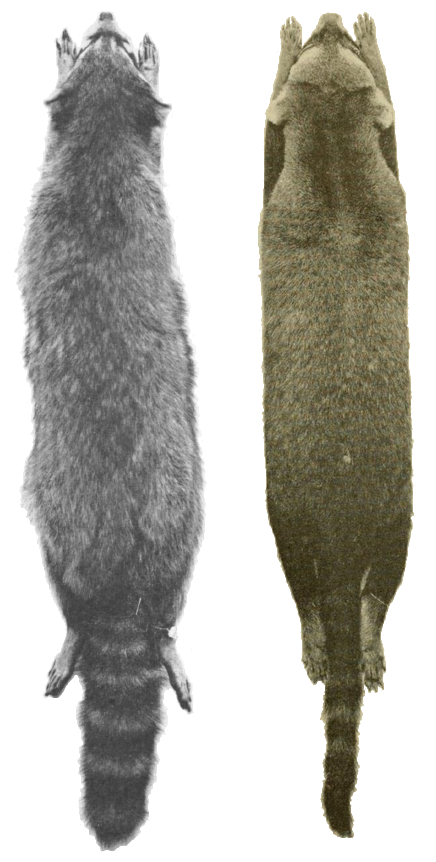
Skins of P. lotor and P. cancrivorus

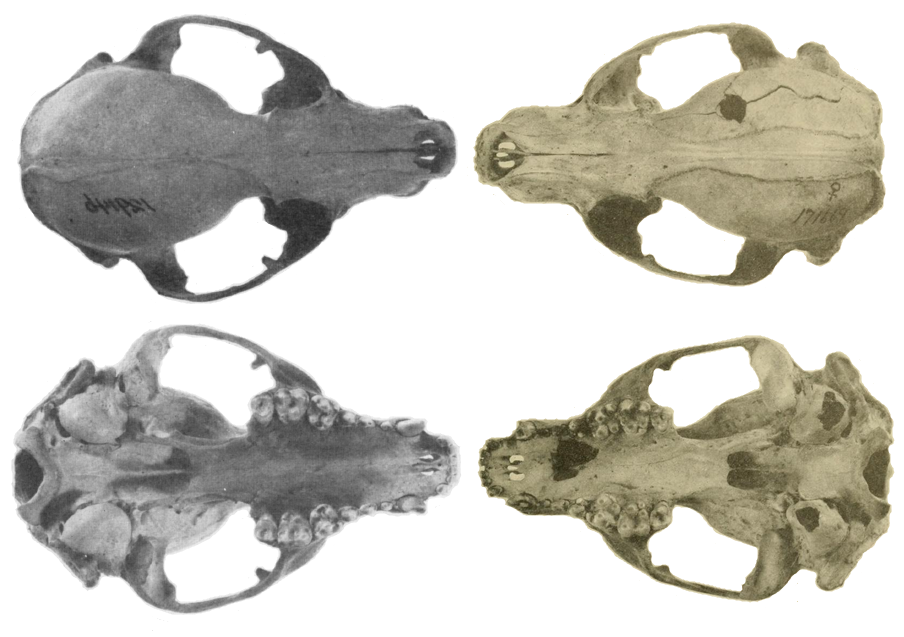
Skulls of P. lotor and P. cancrivorus

In the first decades after its discovery by the members of the expedition of Christopher Columbus, who were the first Europeans to leave a written record about the species, taxonomists thought the raccoon was related to many different species, including dogs, cats, badgers and particularly bears. Carl Linnaeus, the father of modern taxonomy, placed the raccoon in the genus Ursus, first as Ursus cauda elongata ('long-tailed bear') in the second edition of his Systema Naturae (1740), then as Ursus Lotor ('washer bear') in the tenth edition (1758–59). In 1780, Gottlieb Conrad Christian Storr placed the raccoon in its own genus Procyon, which can be translated as either 'before the dog' or 'doglike'. It is also possible that Storr had its nocturnal lifestyle in mind and chose the star Procyon as eponym for the species.

=== Evolution ===
Based on fossil evidence from Russia and Bulgaria, the first known members of the family Procyonidae lived in Europe in the late Oligocene about 25 million years ago. Similar tooth and skull structures suggest procyonids and weasels share a common ancestor, but molecular analysis indicates a closer relationship between raccoons and bears. After the then-existing species crossed the Bering Strait at least six million years later in the early Miocene, the center of its distribution was probably in Central America. Coatis (Nasua and Nasuella) and raccoons (Procyon) have been considered to share common descent from a species in the genus Paranasua present between 5.2 and 6.0 million years ago. This assumption, based on morphological comparisons of fossils, conflicts with a 2006 genetic analysis which indicates raccoons are more closely related to ringtails. Unlike other procyonids, such as the crab-eating raccoon (Procyon cancrivorus), the ancestors of the common raccoon left tropical and subtropical areas and migrated farther north about 2.5 million years ago, in a migration that has been confirmed by the discovery of fossils in the Great Plains dating back to the middle of the Pliocene. Its most recent ancestor was likely Procyon rexroadensis, a large Blancan raccoon from the Rexroad Formation characterized by its narrow back teeth and large lower jaw.

=== Subspecies ===
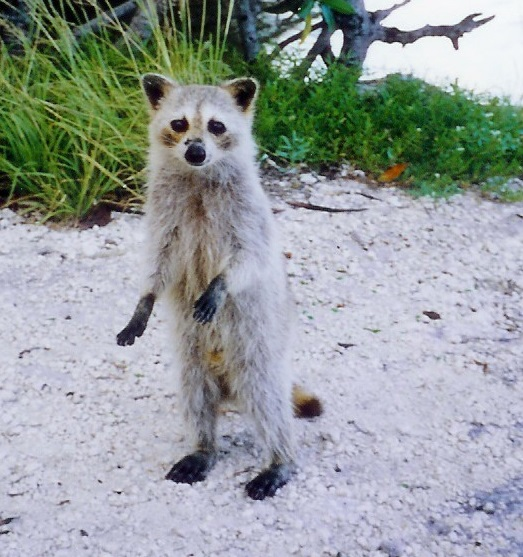
A Torch Key raccoon (P. l. incautus) in Cudjoe Key, Florida. Subspecies inhabiting the Florida Keys are characterized by their small size and very pale fur.

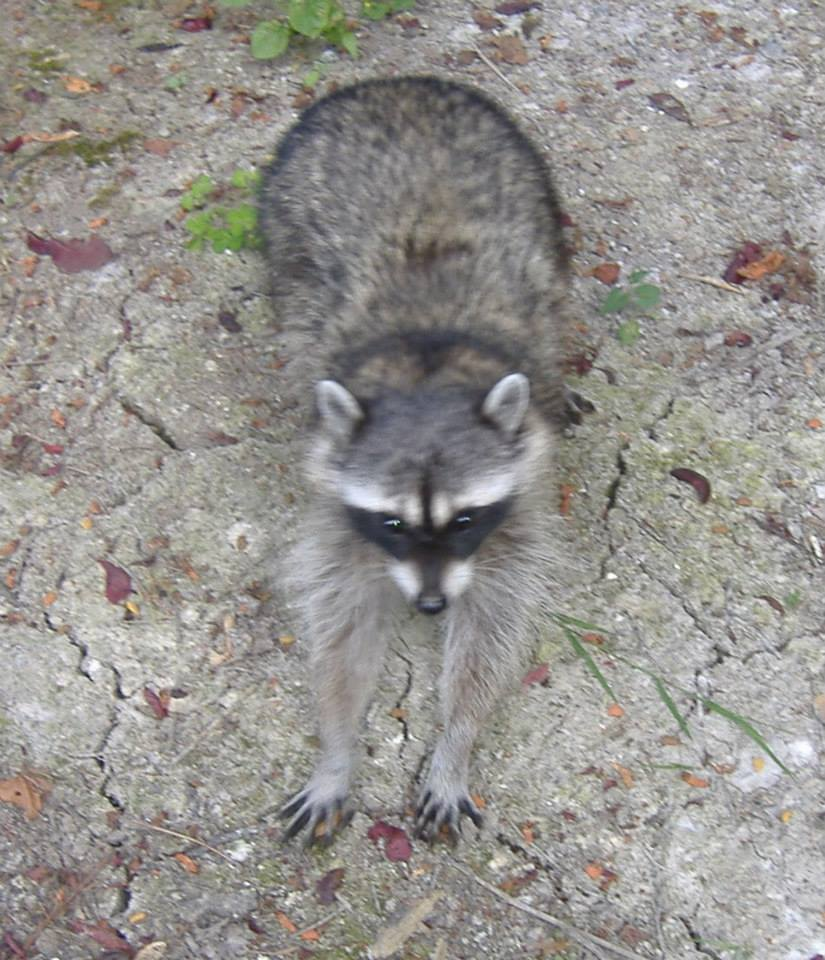
Female raccoon of the Vancouver Island subspecies at Sidney, British Columbia, with characteristic dark fur.

As of 2005, Mammal Species of the World recognizes 22 subspecies of raccoons. Four of these subspecies living only on small Central American and Caribbean islands were often regarded as distinct species after their discovery. These are the Bahamian raccoon and Guadeloupe raccoon, which are very similar to each other; the Tres Marias raccoon, which is larger than average and has an angular skull; and the extinct Barbados raccoon. Studies of their morphological and genetic traits in 1999, 2003, and 2005 led all these island raccoons to be listed as subspecies of the common raccoon in Mammal Species of the World's third edition. A fifth island raccoon population, the Cozumel raccoon, which weighs only 3 to 4 kg (6.6 to 8.8 lb) and has notably small teeth, is still regarded as a separate species.

The four smallest raccoon subspecies, with a typical weight of 1.8 to 2.7 kg (4.0 to 6.0 lb), live along the southern coast of Florida and on the adjacent islands; an example is the Ten Thousand Islands raccoon (Procyon lotor marinus). Most of the other 15 subspecies differ only slightly from each other in coat color, size and other physical characteristics. The two most widespread subspecies are the eastern raccoon (Procyon lotor lotor) and the Upper Mississippi Valley raccoon (Procyon lotor hirtus). Both share a comparatively dark coat with long hairs, but the Upper Mississippi Valley raccoon is larger than the eastern raccoon. The eastern raccoon occurs in all U.S. states and Canadian provinces to the north of South Carolina and Tennessee. The adjacent range of the Upper Mississippi Valley raccoon covers all U.S. states and Canadian provinces to the north of Louisiana, Texas, and New Mexico.

The taxonomic identity of feral raccoons inhabiting Central Europe, Causasia, and Japan is unknown, as the founding populations consisted of uncategorized specimens from zoos and fur farms.

Subspecies	Image	Trinomial authority	Description	Range	Synonyms
Eastern raccoon P. l. lotor Nominate subspecies		Linnaeus, 1758	A small and dark subspecies with long, soft fur.	Nova Scotia, southern New Brunswick, southern Quebec, and southern Ontario south through the eastern United States to North Carolina, and from the Atlantic coast west to Lake Michigan, Indiana, southern Illinois, western Kentucky, and probably eastern Tennessee.	annulatus (G. Fischer, 1814) brachyurus (Wiegmann, 1837) fusca (Burmeister, 1850) gularis (C. E. H. Smith, 1848) melanus (J. E. Gray, 1864) obscurus (Wiegmann, 1837) rufescens (de Beaux, 1910) vulgaris (Tiedemann, 1808)
Key Vaca raccoon P. l. auspicatus		Nelson, 1930	A very small and pale-furred subspecies.	Key Vaca and doubtless closely adjoining keys of the Key Vaca Group, a central section of the main chain off the southern coast of Florida.	
Florida raccoon P. l. elucus		Bangs, 1898	Generally a medium-sized and dark-colored subspecies with a prominent rusty rufous nuchal patch.	Peninsular Florida, except the southwestern part inhabited by P. l. marinus, north to extreme southern Georgia; grading into P. l. varius in northwest Florida.	
Snake River Valley raccoon P. l. excelsus		Nelson and Goldman, 1930	A very large and pale subspecies.	Snake River drainage in southeastern Washington, eastern Oregon, and southern Idaho, the Humboldt River Valley, Nev., and river valleys of northeastern California.	
Texas raccoon P. l. fuscipes		Mearns, 1914	A large, dark grayish subspecies.	Texas, except extreme northern and western parts, southern Arkansas, Louisiana, except the delta region of Mississippi, and south into northeastern Mexico, including Coahuila and Nuevo León, to southern Tamaulipas.	
† Barbados raccoon P. l. gloveralleni		Nelson and Goldman, 1930	A small, dark-furred subspecies with a lightly built skull.	Known only from the Island of Barbados.	solutus (Nelson and Goldman, 1931)
Baja California raccoon P. l. grinnelli		Nelson and Goldman, 1930	A large, pale-furred subspecies with a high and broad skull.	Southern Baja California from the Cape region north at least to San Ignacio.	
Mexican raccoon P. l. hernandezii		Wagler, 1831	A large and dark grayish subspecies with a flattish skull and heavy dentition.	Mexican mainland (primarily central, western, and southern Mexico), extending southward through Guatemala, Belize, El Salvador, Honduras, Nicaragua, Costa Rica, and northern Panama.	crassidens (Hollister, 1914) dickeyi (Nelson and Goldman, 1931) mexicana (Baird, 1858) shufeldti (Nelson and Goldman, 1931)
Upper Mississippi Valley raccoon P. l. hirtus		Nelson and Goldman, 1930	A large and dark-furred subspecies, whose pelage is usually suffused with ochraceous buff.	Upper Mississippi and Missouri River drainage areas from the eastern slopes of the Rocky Mountains east to Lake Michigan, and from southern Manitoba and probably southwestern Ontario and southeastern Alberta south to southern Oklahoma and Arkansas.	
Torch Key raccoon P. l. incautus		Nelson, 1930	A small subspecies with very pale fur (the palest of the Florida raccoons).	Big Pine Key Group, near the southwestern end of the chain of Florida Keys.	
Matecumbe Key raccoon P. l. inesperatus		Nelson, 1930	Similar to P. l. elucus, but smaller and grayer and with a flatter skull.	Key Largo Group, embracing fringing keys along the southeast coast of Florida, from Virginia Key south to Lower Matecumbe Key.	
Tres Marias raccoon P. l. insularis		Merriam, 1898	A large, massive-skulled subspecies with short and coarse fur.	Tres Marías Islands, off west coast of Nayarit, Mexico.	vicinus (Nelson and Goldman, 1931)
Saint Simon Island raccoon P. l. litoreus		Nelson and Goldman, 1930	Similar to P. l. elucus, being of medium size and having dark fur.	Coastal strip and islands of Georgia.	
Ten Thousand Islands raccoon P. l. marinus		Nelson, 1930	A very small subspecies with heavy dentition.	Keys of the Ten Thousand Islands Group, and the adjoining mainland of southwestern Florida from Cape Sable north through the Everglades to Lake Okeechobee.	maritimus (Dozier, 1948)
Bahamian raccoon P. l. maynardi		Bangs, 1898	A small and slightly dark subspecies with a lightly built skull and dentition.	Known only from New Providence Island, Bahamas.	flavidus (de Beaux, 1910) minor (Miller, 1911) varius (Nelson and Goldman, 1930)
Mississippi Delta raccoon P. l. megalodous		Lowery, 1943	A medium-sized subspecies, with a massive skull and pale yellow fur suffused above with black.	Coast region of southern Louisiana from St. Bernard Parish west to Cameron Parish.	
Guadeloupe raccoon P. l. minor		Miller, 1911	A small subspecies with a delicate skull, a dark gray coat, and a slight ochre tint on the neck and shoulders.	Guadeloupe in the Lesser Antilles (both islands: Grande-Terre and Basse-Terre).	
Pacific Northwest raccoon P. l. pacificus		Merriam, 1899	A dark-furred subspecies with a relatively broad, flat skull.	Southwestern British Columbia, except Vancouver Island, northern, central, and western Washington, western Oregon, and extreme northwestern California.	proteus (Brass, 1911)
Colorado Desert raccoon P. l. pallidus		Merriam, 1900	One of the palest subspecies, around the same size as P. l. mexicanus.	Colorado and Gila River Valleys and adjoining territory from the delta north to northeastern Utah, and east to western Colorado and northwestern New Mexico.	ochraceus (Mearns, 1914)
California raccoon P. l. psora		Gray, 1842	A large and moderately dark subspecies with a broad, rather flat skull.	California, except the extreme northwest coastal strip, the northeastern corner, and southeastern desert region, ranging south through northwestern Baja California to San Quentin; extreme west central Nevada.	californicus (Means, 1914)
Isthmian raccoon P. l. pumilus		Miller, 1911	Similar to P. l. crassidens in color, but has a shorter, broader, and flatter skull.	Panama and the Canal Zone from Porto Bello west to Boqueron, Chiriqui, though the limits of its range are unknown.	
† Short-faced raccoon P. l. simus		Gidley, 1906	A Pleistocene subspecies similar to P. l. excelsus, but with a deeper lower jaw and a more robust dentition.	California.	
Vancouver Island raccoon P. l. vancouverensis		Nelson and Goldman, 1930	A dark-furred subspecies, similar to P. l. pacificus but smaller.	Known only from Vancouver Island.	

== Description ==
=== Physical characteristics ===
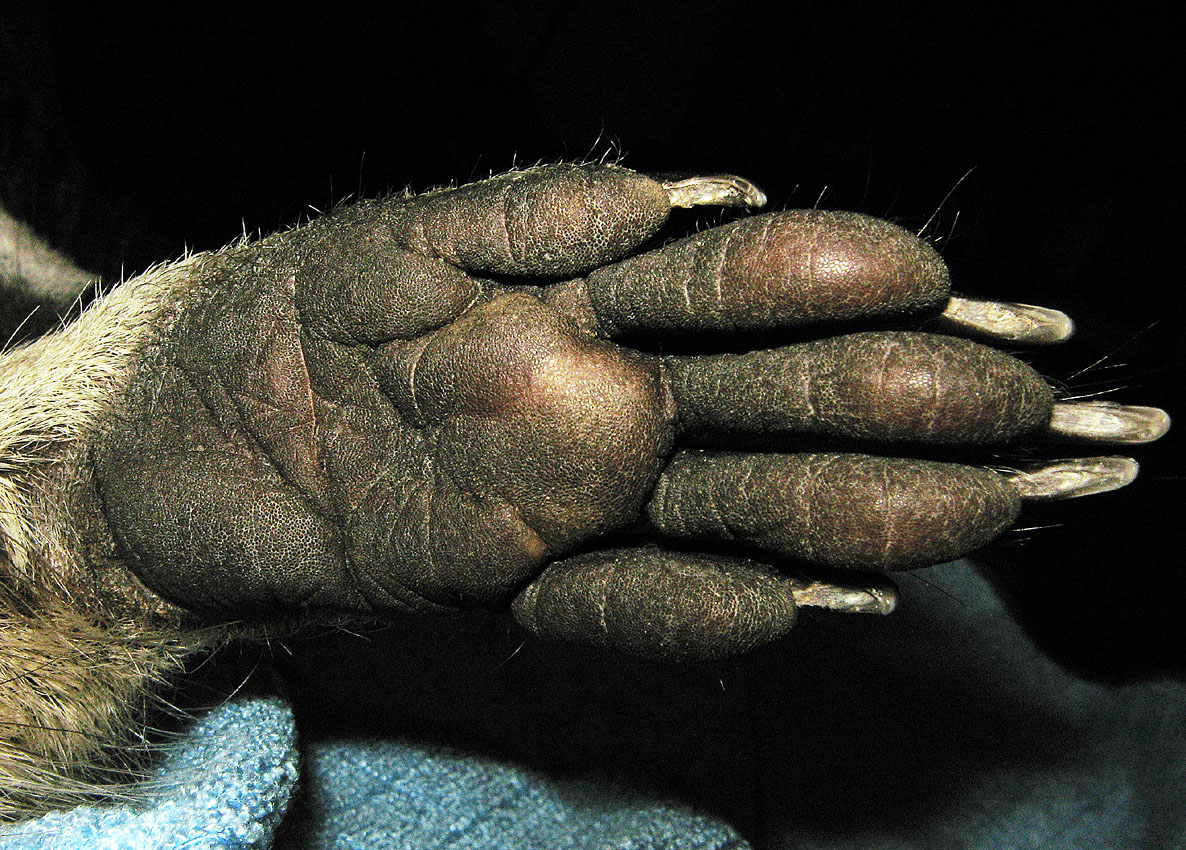
Lower side of front paw with visible vibrissae on the tips of the digits

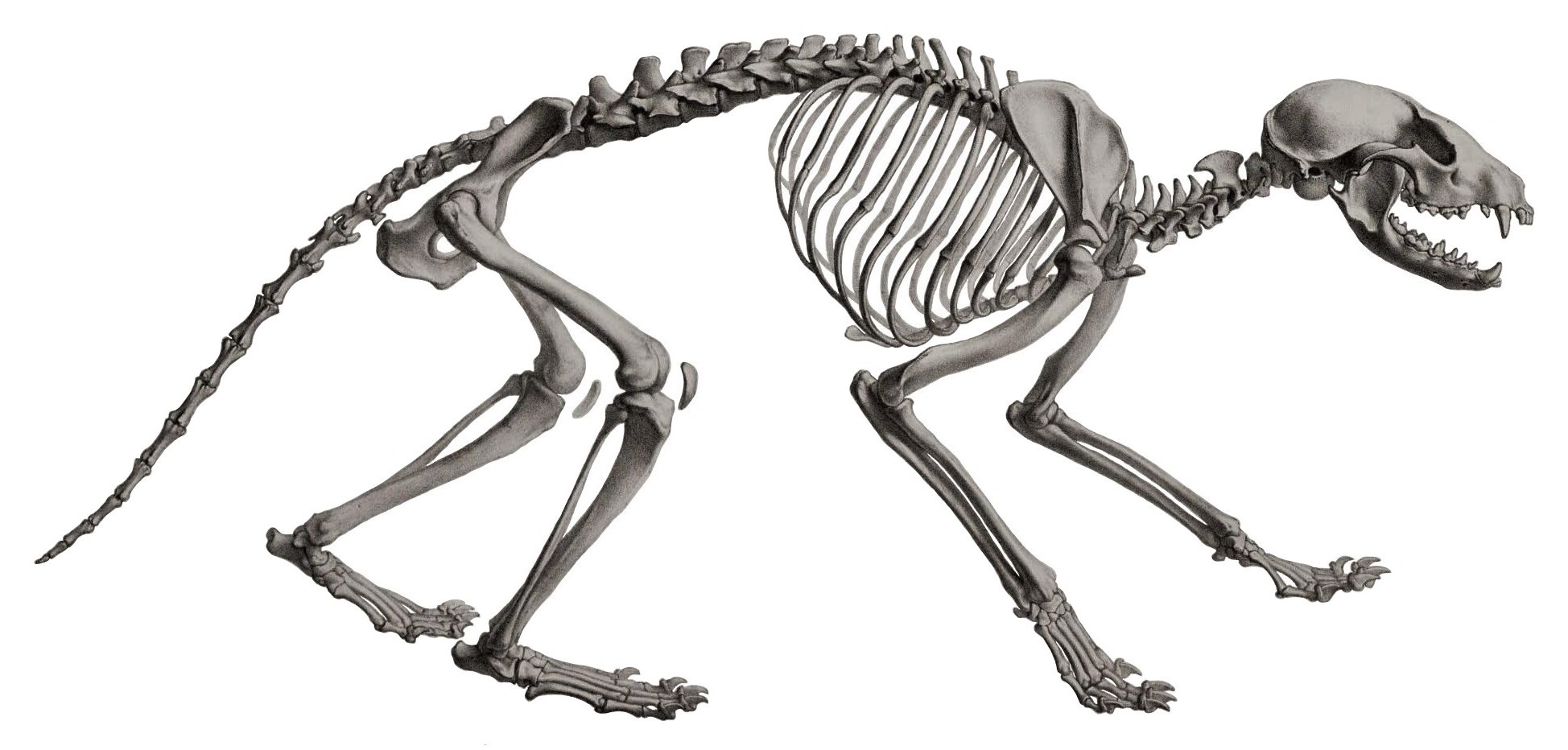
Skeleton

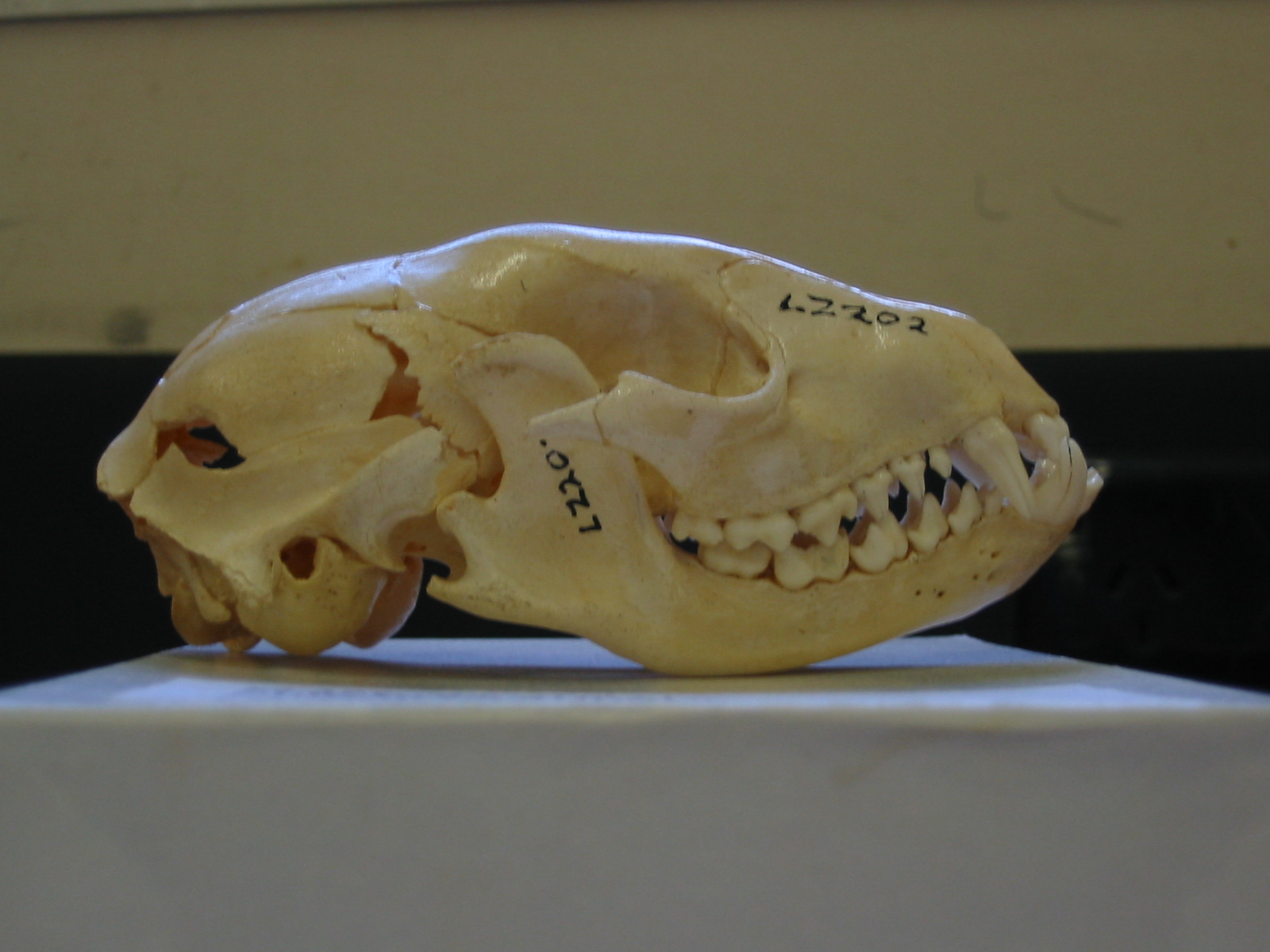
Skull with dentition: 2/2 molars, 4/4 premolars, 1/1 canines, 3/3 incisors

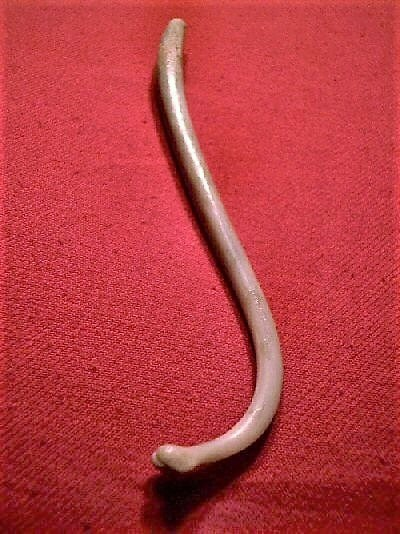
Baculum or penis bone

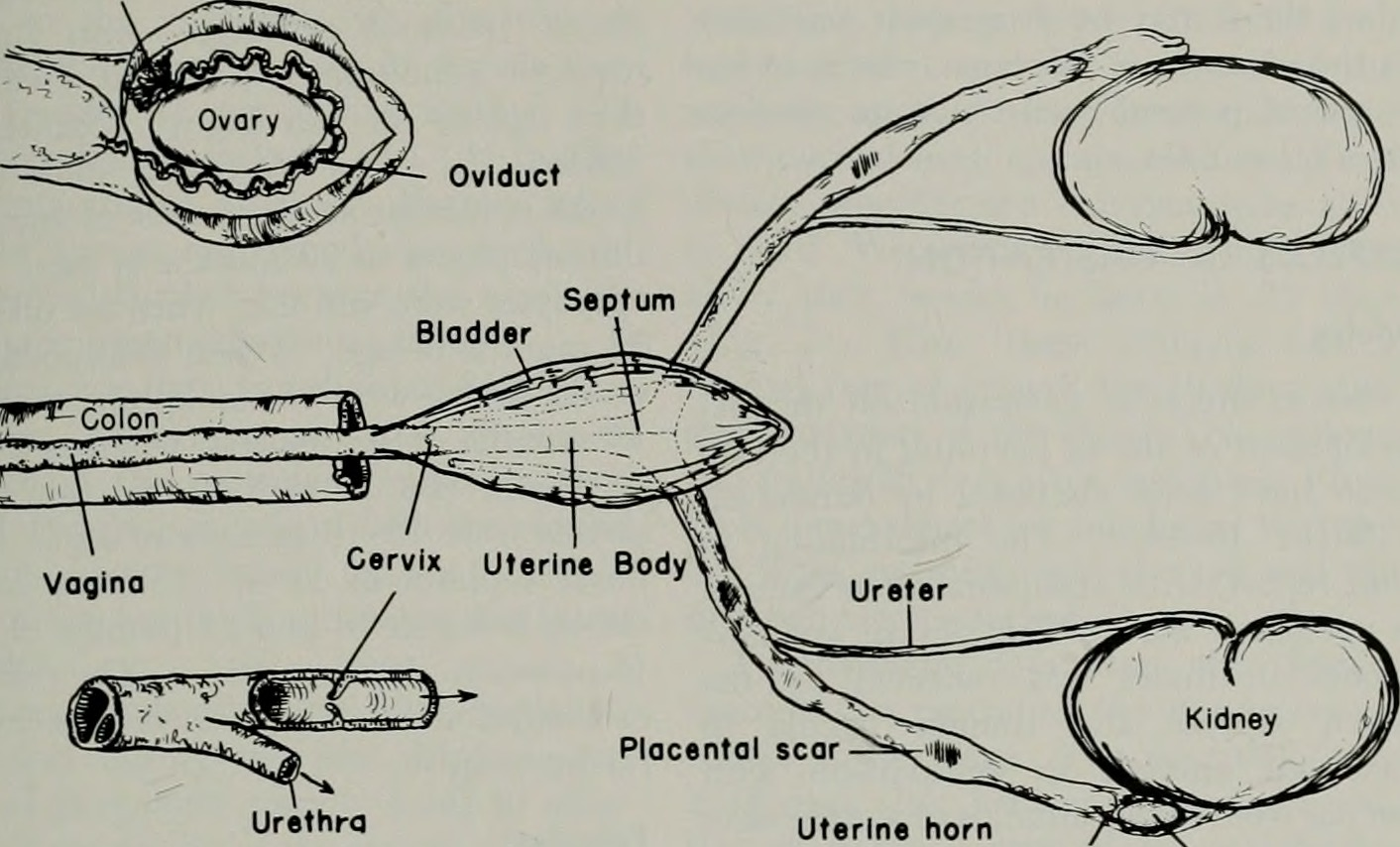
Female genitourinary system

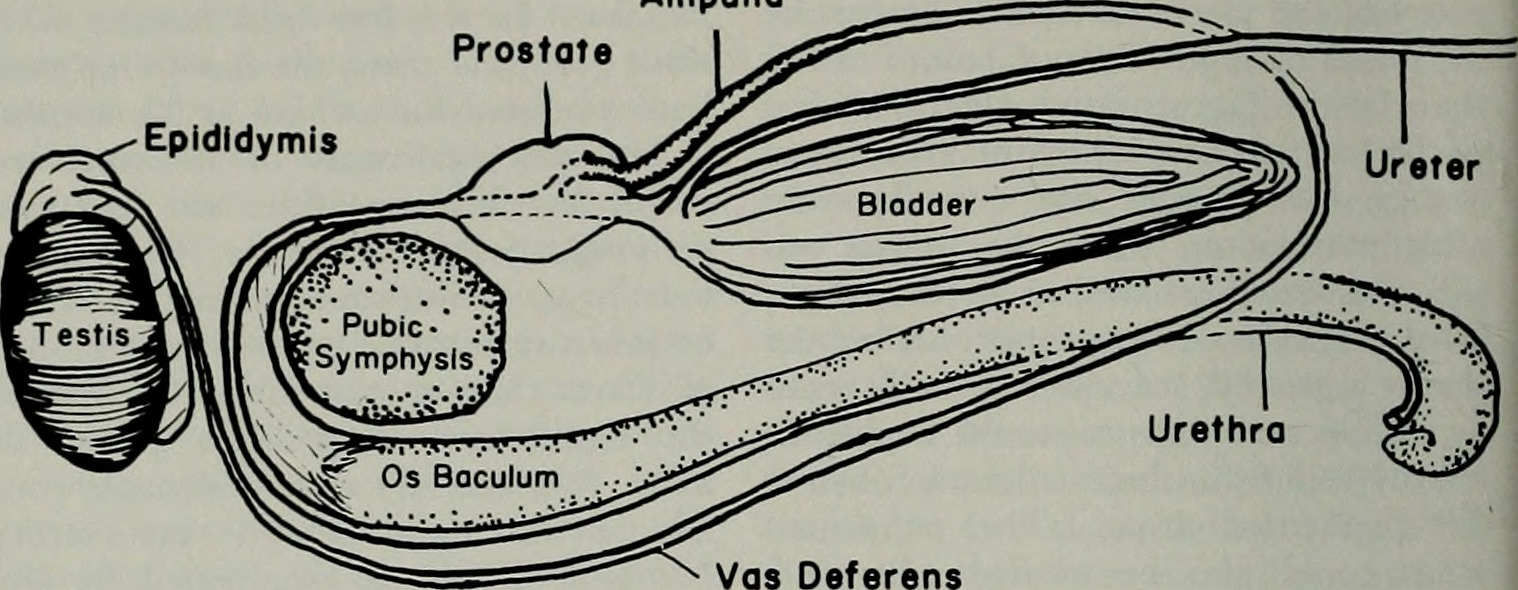
Male genitourinary system

Head to hindquarters, raccoons measure between 40 and 70 cm (16 and 28 in), not including the bushy tail which can measure between 20 and 40 cm (7.9 and 15.7 in), but is usually not much longer than 25 cm (9.8 in). The shoulder height is between 23 and 30 cm (9.1 and 11.8 in). The body weight of an adult raccoon varies considerably with habitat, making the raccoon one of the most variably sized mammals. It can range from 2 to 26 kg (4.4 to 57.3 lb), but is usually between 5 and 12 kg (11 and 26 lb). The smallest specimens live in southern Florida, while those near the northern limits of the raccoon's range tend to be the largest. Males are usually 15 to 20% heavier than females. At the beginning of winter, a raccoon can weigh twice as much as in spring because of fat storage. The largest recorded wild raccoon weighed 28.4 kg (63 lb) and measured 140 cm (55 in) in total length, by far the largest size recorded for a procyonid.

The most characteristic physical feature of the raccoon is the area of black fur around the eyes, which contrasts sharply with the surrounding white face coloring. This is reminiscent of a "bandit's mask" and has thus enhanced the animal's reputation for mischief. The slightly rounded ears are also bordered by white fur. Raccoons are assumed to recognize the facial expression and posture of other members of their species more quickly because of the conspicuous facial coloration and the alternating light and dark rings on the tail. The dark mask may also reduce glare and thus enhance night vision. On other parts of the body, the long and stiff guard hairs, which shed moisture, are usually colored in shades of gray and, to a lesser extent, brown. Raccoons with a very dark coat are more common in the German population because individuals with such coloring were among those initially released to the wild. The dense underfur, which accounts for almost 90% of the coat, insulates against cold weather and is composed of 2 to 3 cm (0.79 to 1.18 in) long hairs.

The raccoon, whose method of locomotion is usually considered to be plantigrade, can stand on its hind legs to examine objects with its front paws. As raccoons have short legs compared to their compact torso, they are usually not able to run quickly or jump great distances. Their top speed over short distances is 16 to 24 km/h (9.9 to 14.9 mph). Raccoons can swim with an average speed of about 5 km/h (3.1 mph) and can stay in the water for several hours. For climbing down a tree headfirst—an unusual ability for a mammal of its size—a raccoon rotates its hind feet so they are pointing backwards. Raccoons have a dual cooling system to regulate their temperature; that is, they can both sweat and pant for heat dissipation.

Raccoon skulls have a short and wide facial region and a voluminous braincase. The facial length of the skull is less than the cranial, and their nasal bones are short and quite broad. The auditory bullae is inflated in form, and the sagittal crest is weakly developed. The dentition—40 teeth with the dental formula:3.1.4.23.1.4.2—is adapted to their omnivorous diet: the carnassials are not as sharp and pointed as those of a full-time carnivore, but the molars are not as wide as those of a herbivore. The penis bone of males is about 10 cm (3.9 in) long and strongly bent at the front end, and its shape can be used to distinguish juvenile males from mature males. Seven of the thirteen identified vocal calls are used in communication between the mother and her kits, one of these being the birdlike twittering of newborns.

=== Senses ===
The most important sense for the raccoon is its sense of touch. The "hyper sensitive" front paws are protected by a thin horny layer that becomes pliable when wet. The five digits of the paws have no webbing between them, which is unusual for a carnivoran. Almost two-thirds of the area responsible for sensory perception in the raccoon's cerebral cortex is specialized for the interpretation of tactile impulses, more than in any other studied animal. They are able to identify objects before touching them with vibrissae located above their sharp, nonretractable claws. The raccoon's paws lack an opposable thumb; thus, it does not have the agility of the hands of primates. There is no observed negative effect on tactile perception when a raccoon stands in water below 10 °C (50 °F) for hours.

Raccoons are thought to be color blind or at least poorly able to distinguish color, though their eyes are well-adapted for sensing green light. Although their accommodation of 11 dioptre is comparable to that of humans and they see well in twilight because of the tapetum lucidum behind the retina, visual perception is of subordinate importance to raccoons because of their poor long-distance vision. In addition to being useful for orientation in the dark, their sense of smell is important for intraspecific communication. Glandular secretions (usually from their anal glands), urine and feces are used for marking. With their broad auditory range, they can perceive tones up to 50–85 kHz as well as quiet noises, like those produced by earthworms underground.

=== Intelligence ===
Zoologist Clinton Hart Merriam described raccoons as "clever beasts", and that "in certain directions their cunning surpasses that of the fox". The animal's intelligence gave rise to the epithet "sly coon". Only a few studies have been undertaken to determine the mental abilities of raccoons, most of them based on the animal's sense of touch. In a study by the ethologist H. B. Davis in 1908, raccoons were able to open 11 of 13 complex locks in fewer than 10 tries and had no problems repeating the action when the locks were rearranged or turned upside down. Davis concluded that they understood the abstract principles of the locking mechanisms and their learning speed was equivalent to that of rhesus macaques.

Studies in 1963, 1973, 1975, and 1992 concentrated on raccoon memory showed that they can remember the solutions to tasks for at least three years. In a study by B. Pohl in 1992, raccoons were able to instantly differentiate between identical and different symbols three years after the short initial learning phase. Stanislas Dehaene reports in his book The Number Sense that raccoons can distinguish boxes containing two or four grapes from those containing three. In research by Suzana Herculano-Houzel and other neuroscientists, raccoons are comparable to primates in density of neurons in the cerebral cortex, which they have proposed to be a neuroanatomical indicator of intelligence.

== Behavior ==
=== Social behavior ===
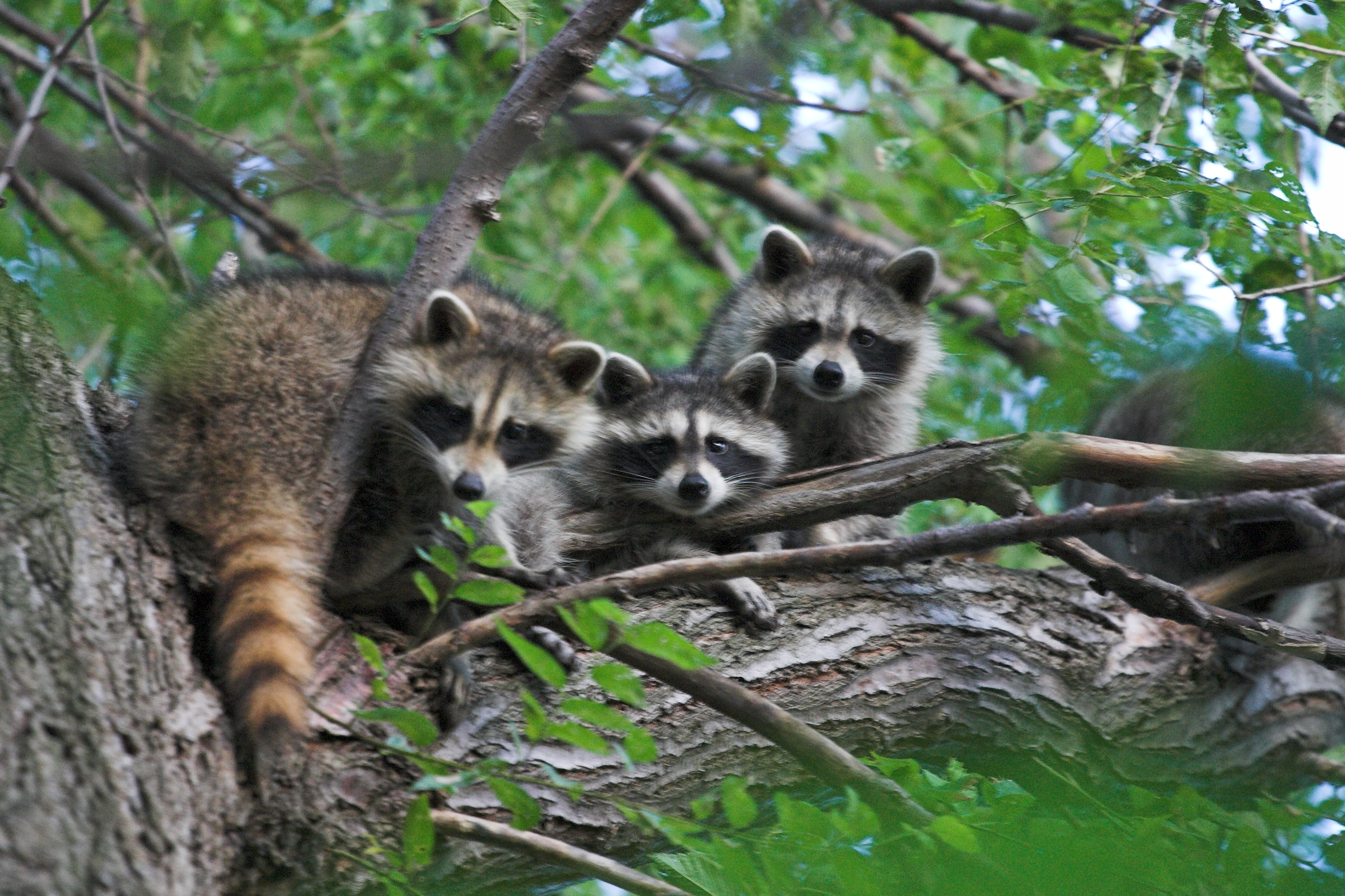
Eastern raccoons (P. l. lotor) in a tree: The raccoon's social structure is grouped into what Ulf Hohmann calls a "three-class society".

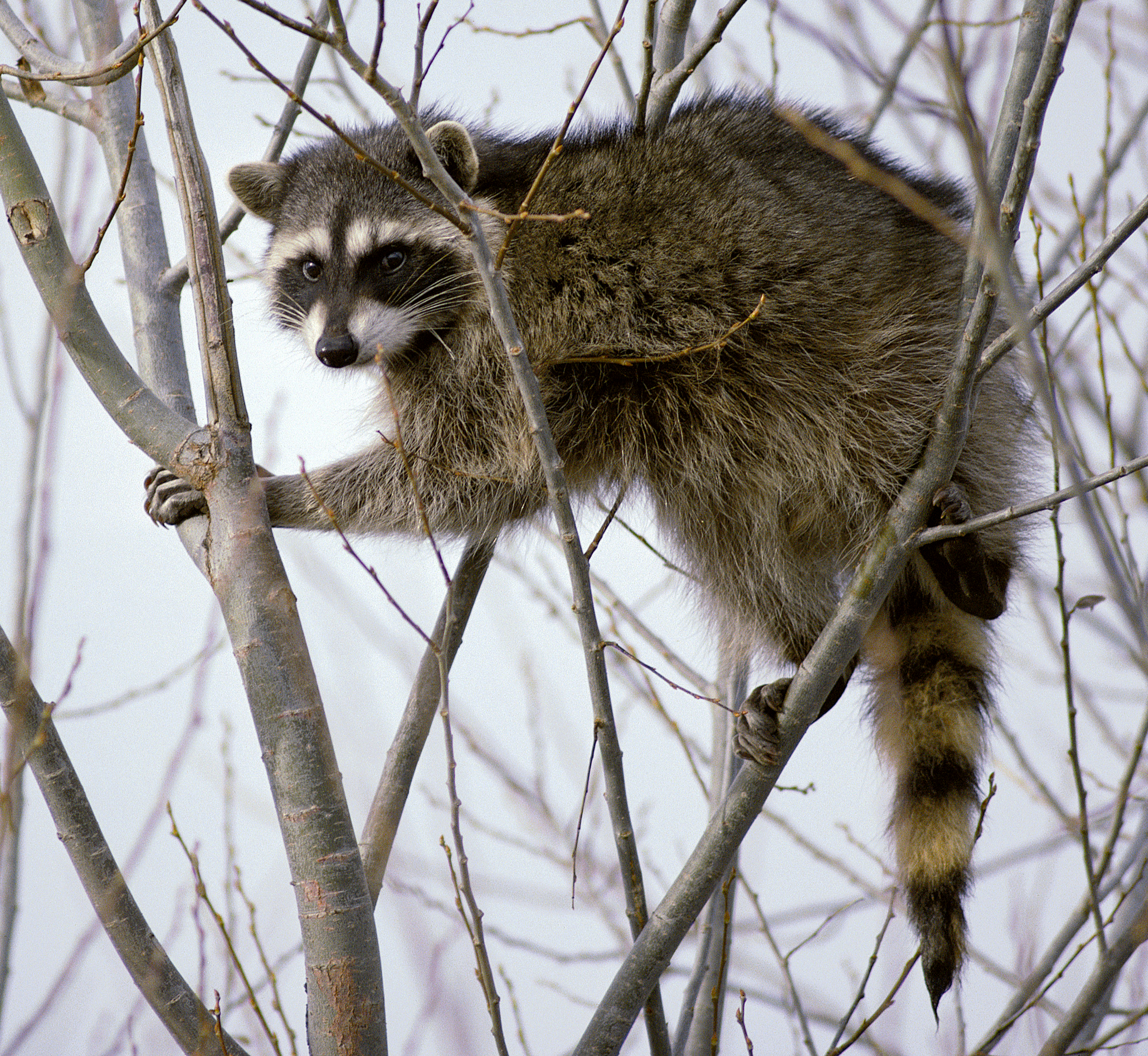
California raccoon (P. l. psora) climbing a tree in Lower Klamath National Wildlife Refuge

Baby raccoon chatter

Studies in the 1990s by the ethologists Stanley D. Gehrt and Ulf Hohmann suggest that raccoons engage in sex-specific social behaviors and are not typically solitary, as was previously thought. Related females often live in a so-called "fission-fusion society"; that is, they share a common area and occasionally meet at feeding or resting grounds. Unrelated males often form loose male social groups to maintain their position against foreign males during the mating season—or against other potential invaders. Such a group does not usually consist of more than four individuals. Since some males show aggressive behavior towards unrelated kits, mothers will isolate themselves from other raccoons until their kits are big enough to defend themselves.

Concerning these three different modes of life prevalent among raccoons, Hohmann called their social structure a "three-class society". Samuel I. Zeveloff, professor of zoology at Weber State University and author of the book Raccoons: A Natural History, is more cautious in his interpretation and concludes at least the females are solitary most of the time and, according to Erik K. Fritzell's study in North Dakota in 1978, males in areas with low population densities are solitary as well.

The shape and size of a raccoon's home range vary depending on age, sex, and habitat, with adults claiming areas more than twice as large as juveniles. While the size of home ranges in the habitat of North Dakota's prairies lie between 7 and 50 km^{2} (3 and 20 sq mi) for males and between 2 and 16 km^{2} (1 and 6 sq mi) for females, the average size in a marsh at Lake Erie was 0.5 km^{2} (0.19 sq mi). Irrespective of whether the home ranges of adjacent groups overlap, they are most likely not actively defended outside the mating season if food supplies are sufficient. Odor marks on prominent spots are assumed to establish home ranges and identify individuals. Urine and feces left at shared raccoon latrines may provide additional information about feeding grounds, since raccoons were observed to meet there later for collective eating, sleeping, and playing.

Concerning the general behavior patterns of raccoons, Gehrt points out that "typically you'll find 10 to 15 percent that will do the opposite" of what is expected.

=== Diet ===
Though usually nocturnal, the raccoon is sometimes active in daylight to take advantage of available food sources. Its diet consists of about 40% invertebrates, 33% plant material and 27% vertebrates. Since its diet consists of such a variety of different foods, Zeveloff argues the raccoon "may well be one of the world's most omnivorous animals". While its diet in spring and early summer consists mostly of insects, worms, and other animals already available early in the year, it prefers fruits and nuts, such as acorns and walnuts, which emerge in late summer and autumn, and represent a rich calorie source for building up fat needed for winter.

Contrary to popular belief, raccoons only occasionally eat active or large prey, such as birds and mammals. They prefer prey that is easier to catch, specifically crayfish, insects, fish, amphibians and bird eggs. Raccoons are avid predators of eggs and hatchlings in both birds and reptile nests, to such a degree that, for threatened prey species, raccoons may need to be removed from the area or nests may need to be relocated to mitigate the effect of their predation (e.g. in the case of some globally threatened turtles). When food is plentiful, raccoons can develop strong individual preferences for specific foods. In the northern parts of their range, raccoons go into a winter rest, reducing their activity drastically as long as a permanent snow cover makes searching for food difficult.

=== Dousing ===
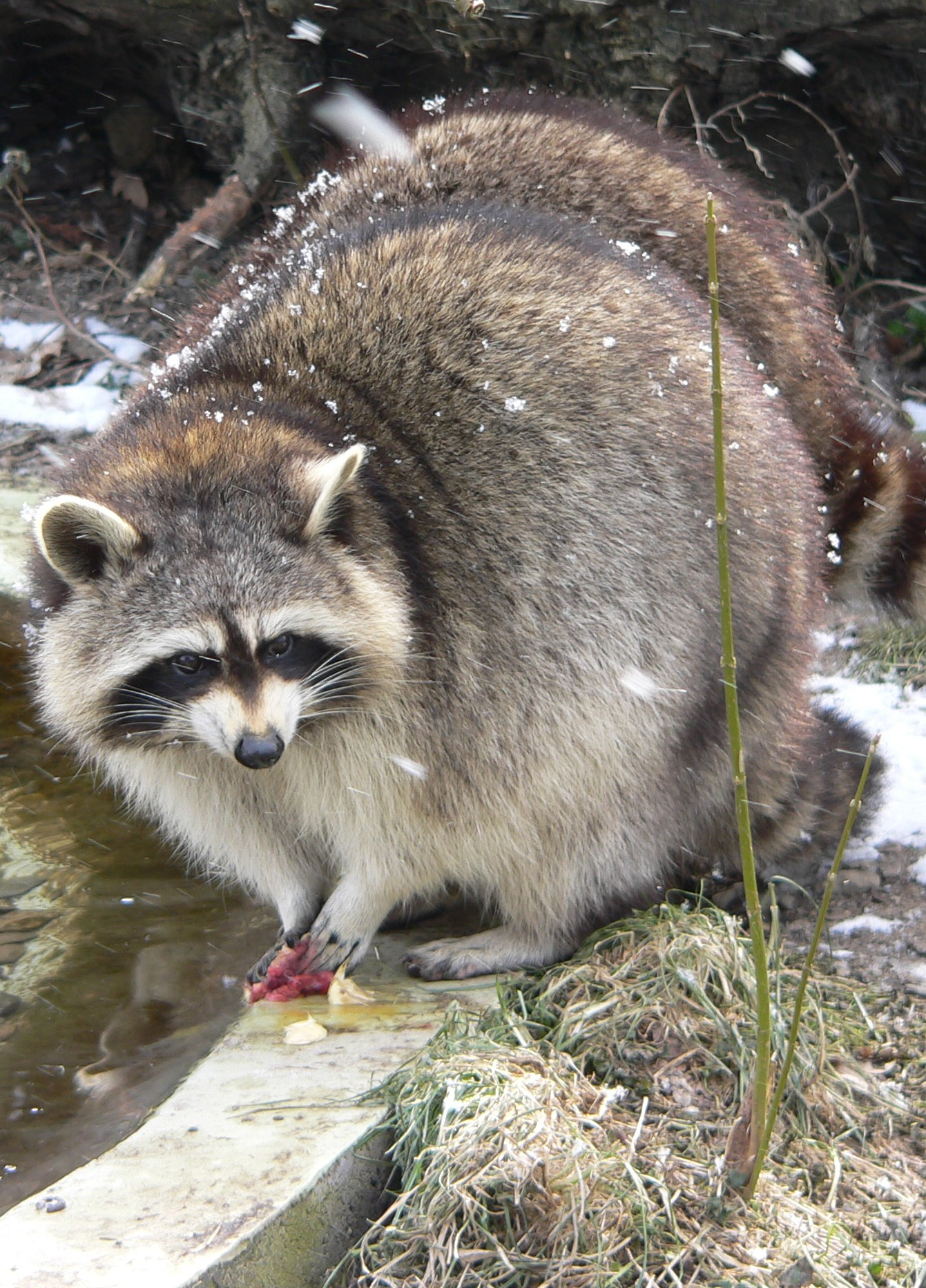
Captive raccoons often douse their food before eating.

One aspect of raccoon behavior is so well known that it gives the animal part of its scientific name, Procyon lotor; lotor is Latin for 'washer'. In the wild, raccoons often dabble for underwater food near the shoreline. They then often pick up the food item with their front paws to examine it and rub the item, sometimes to remove unwanted parts. This gives the appearance of the raccoon "washing" the food. The tactile sensitivity of raccoons' paws is increased if this rubbing action is performed underwater, since the water softens the hard layer covering the paws. However, the behavior observed in captive raccoons in which they carry their food to water to "wash" or douse it before eating has not been observed in the wild. Naturalist Georges-Louis Leclerc, Comte de Buffon, believed that raccoons do not have adequate saliva production to moisten food, thereby necessitating dousing, but this hypothesis is now considered to be incorrect. Captive raccoons douse their food more frequently when a watering hole with a layout similar to a stream is not farther away than 3 m (10 ft). The widely accepted theory is that dousing in captive raccoons is a fixed action pattern from the dabbling behavior performed when foraging at shores for aquatic foods. This is supported by the observation that aquatic foods are doused more frequently. Cleaning dirty food does not seem to be a reason for "washing".

In addition to its scientific name, the dousing behaviour gives rise to the raccoon's name in several languages, such as French (raton laveur "washing rat-pup") and German (Waschbär "wash-bear").

=== Reproduction ===
Raccoons usually mate in a period triggered by increasing daylight between late January and mid-March. However, there are large regional differences which are not completely explicable by solar conditions. For example, while raccoons in southern states typically mate later than average, the mating season in Manitoba also peaks later than usual in March and extends until June. During the mating season, males restlessly roam their home ranges in search of females in an attempt to court them during the three- to four-day period when conception is possible. These encounters will often occur at central meeting places. Copulation, including foreplay, can last over an hour and is repeated over several nights. The weaker members of a male social group also are assumed to get the opportunity to mate, since the stronger ones cannot mate with all available females. In a study in southern Texas during the mating seasons from 1990 to 1992, about one-third of all females mated with more than one male. If a female does not become pregnant or if she loses her kits early, she will sometimes become fertile again 80 to 140 days later.

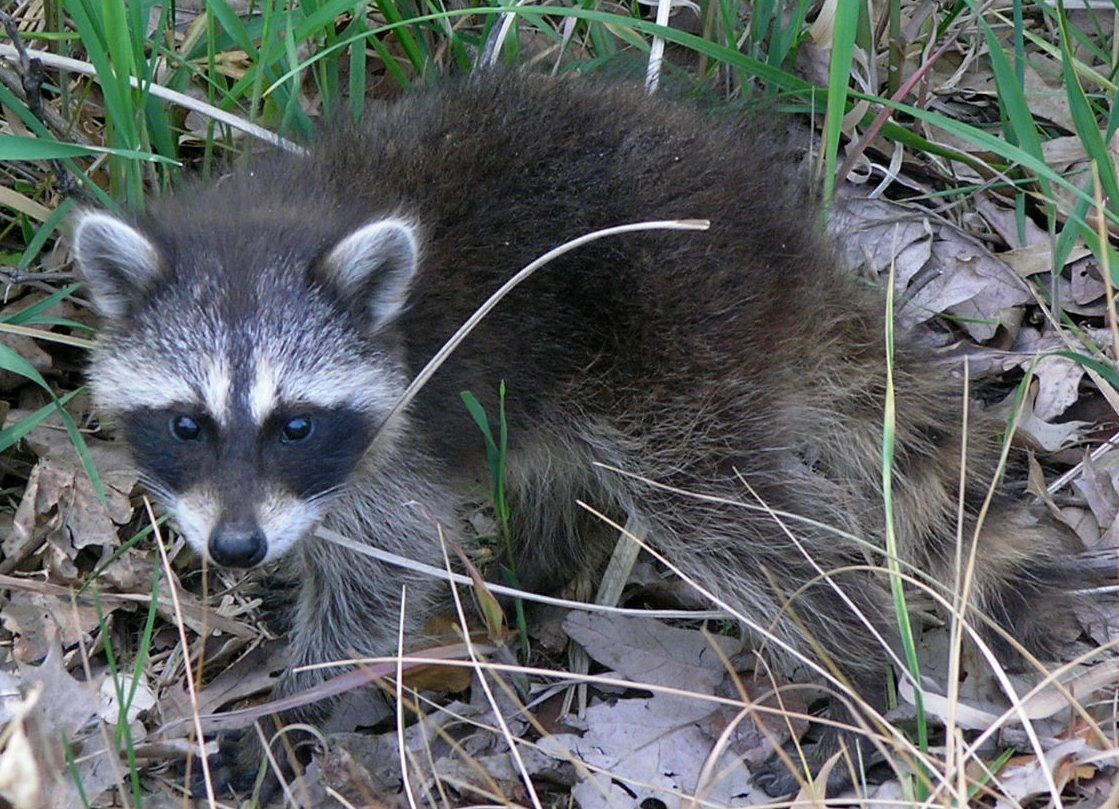
An eastern raccoon (P. l. lotor) kit

After usually 63 to 65 days of gestation (although anywhere from 54 to 70 days is possible), a litter of typically two to five young is born. The average litter size varies widely with habitat, ranging from 2.5 in Alabama to 4.8 in North Dakota. Larger litters are more common in areas with a high mortality rate, due, for example, to hunting or severe winters. While male yearlings usually reach their sexual maturity only after the main mating season, female yearlings can compensate for high mortality rates and may be responsible for about 50% of all young born in a year. Males have no part in raising young. The kits (also called "cubs") are blind and deaf at birth, but their mask is already visible against their light fur. The birth weight of the roughly 10 cm (4 in)-long kits is between 60 and 75 g (2.1 and 2.6 oz). Their ear canals open after around 18 to 23 days, a few days before their eyes open for the first time. Once the kits weigh about 1 kg (2 lb), they begin to explore outside the den, consuming solid food for the first time after six to nine weeks. After this point, their mother suckles them with decreasing frequency; they are usually weaned by 16 weeks. In the fall, after their mother has shown them dens and feeding grounds, the juvenile group splits up. While many females will stay close to the home range of their mother, males can sometimes move more than 20 km (12 mi) away. This is considered an instinctive behavior, preventing inbreeding. However, mother and offspring may share a den during the first winter in cold areas.

=== Life expectancy ===
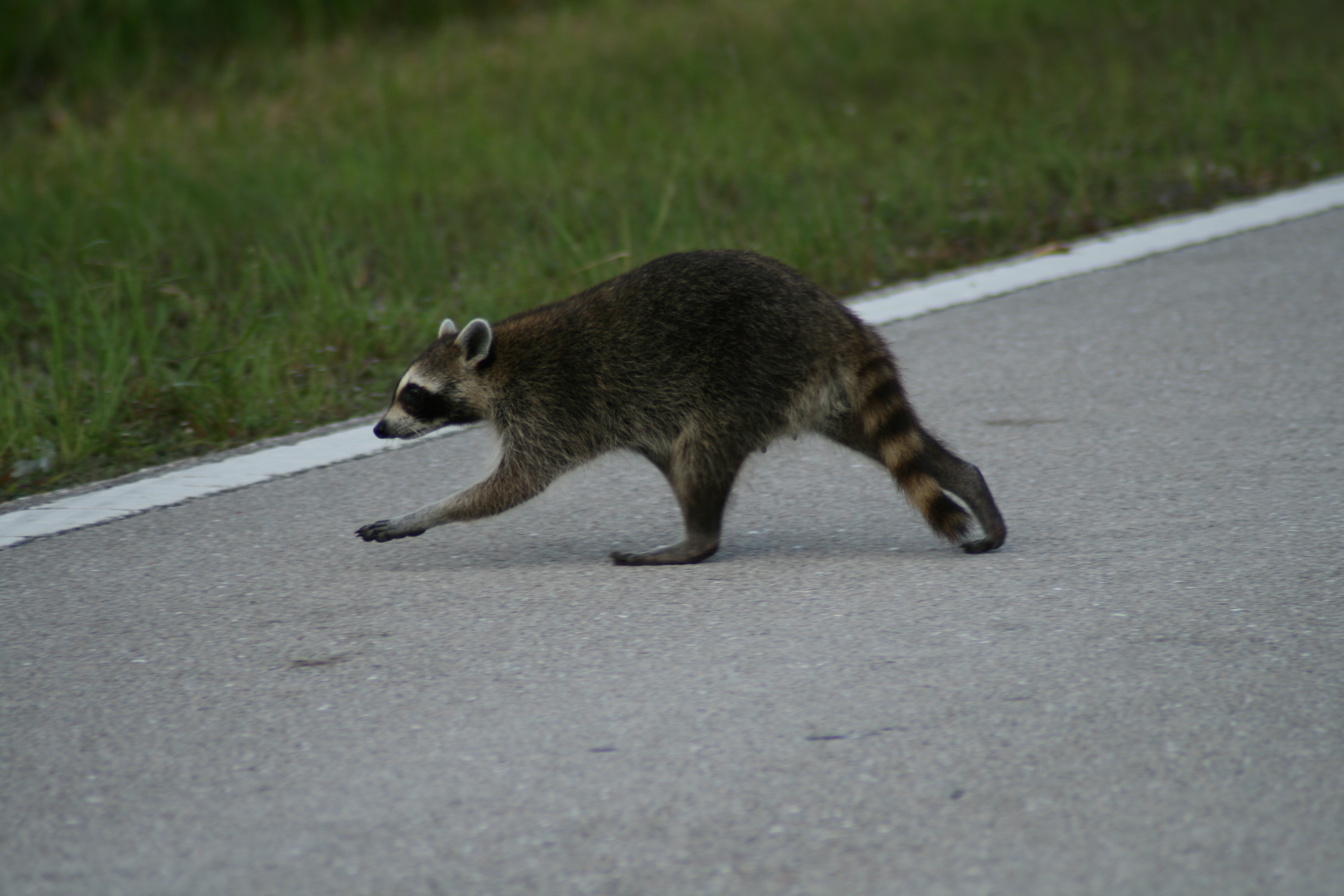
Young Florida raccoon (P. l. elucus) crossing a road

Captive raccoons have been known to live for more than 20 years. However, the species' life expectancy in the wild is only 1.8 to 3.1 years, depending on the local conditions such as traffic volume, hunting, and weather severity. It is not unusual for only half of the young born in one year to survive a full year. After this point, the annual mortality rate drops to between 10% and 30%. Young raccoons are vulnerable to losing their mother and to starvation, particularly in long and cold winters. The most frequent natural cause of death in the North American raccoon population is distemper, which can reach epidemic proportions and kill most of a local raccoon population. In areas with heavy vehicular traffic and extensive hunting, these factors can account for up to 90% of all deaths of adult raccoons. The most important natural predators of the raccoon are bobcats, coyotes, and great horned owls, the latter mainly preying on young raccoons but capable of killing adults in some cases. In Florida, they have been reported to fall victim to larger carnivores like American black bear and cougars and these species may also be a threat on occasion in other areas. Where still present, gray wolves may still occasionally take raccoons as a supplemental prey item. Also in the southeast, they are among the favored prey for adult American alligators. On occasion, both bald and golden eagles will prey on raccoons. In the tropics, raccoons are known to fall prey to smaller eagles such as ornate hawk-eagles and black hawk-eagles, although it is not clear whether adults or merely juvenile raccoons are taken by these. In rare cases of overlap, they may fall victim from carnivores ranging from species averaging smaller than themselves such as fishers to those as large and formidable as jaguars in Mexico. In their introduced range in the former Soviet Union, their main predators are wolves, lynxes and Eurasian eagle-owls. However, predation is not a significant cause of death, especially because larger predators have been exterminated in many areas inhabited by raccoons.

== Range ==
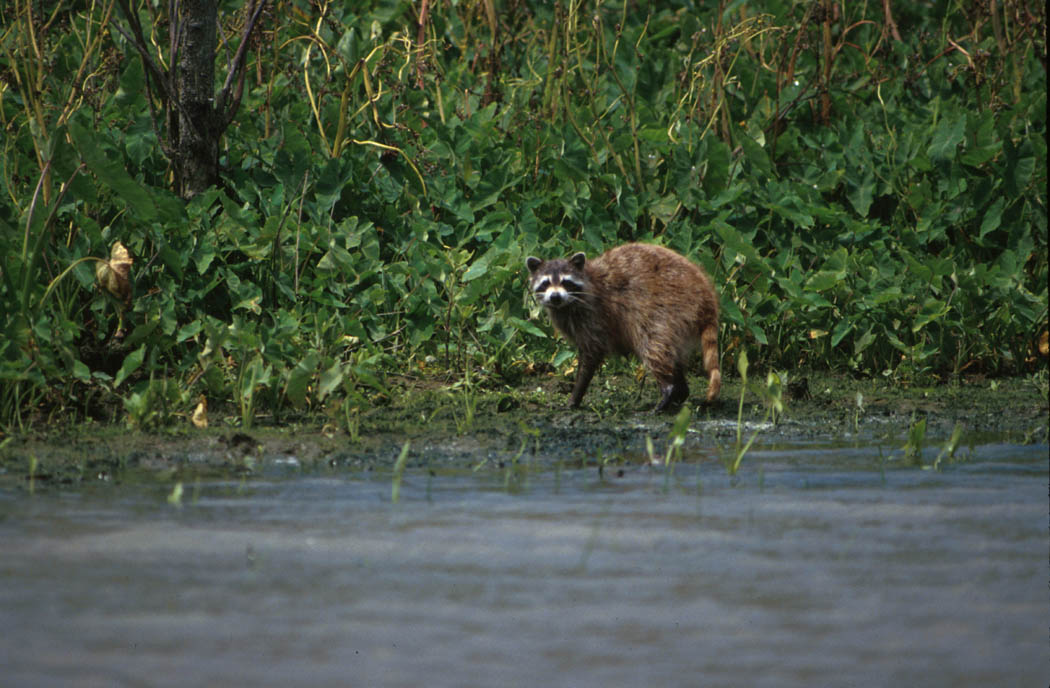
Mississippi Delta raccoon (P. l. megaloudus) searching for food on a lake shore

=== Habitat ===
Although they have thrived in sparsely wooded areas in the last decades, raccoons depend on vertical structures to climb when they feel threatened. Therefore, they avoid open terrain and areas with high concentrations of beech trees, as beech bark is too smooth to climb. Tree hollows in old oaks or other trees and rock crevices are preferred by raccoons as sleeping, winter, and litter dens. If such dens are unavailable or accessing them is inconvenient, raccoons use burrows dug by other mammals, dense undergrowth, or tree crotches. In a study in the Solling range of hills in Germany, more than 60% of all sleeping places were used only once, but those used at least ten times accounted for about 70% of all uses. Since amphibians, crustaceans, and other animals around the shore of lakes and rivers are an important part of the raccoon's diet, lowland deciduous or mixed forests abundant with water and marshes sustain the highest population densities. While population densities range from 0.5 to 3.2 animals per square kilometer (1.3 to 8.3 animals per square mile) in prairies and do not usually exceed 6 animals per square kilometer (15.5 animals per square mile) in upland hardwood forests, more than 20 raccoons per square kilometer (51.8 animals per square mile) can live in lowland forests and marshes.

=== Distribution in North America ===
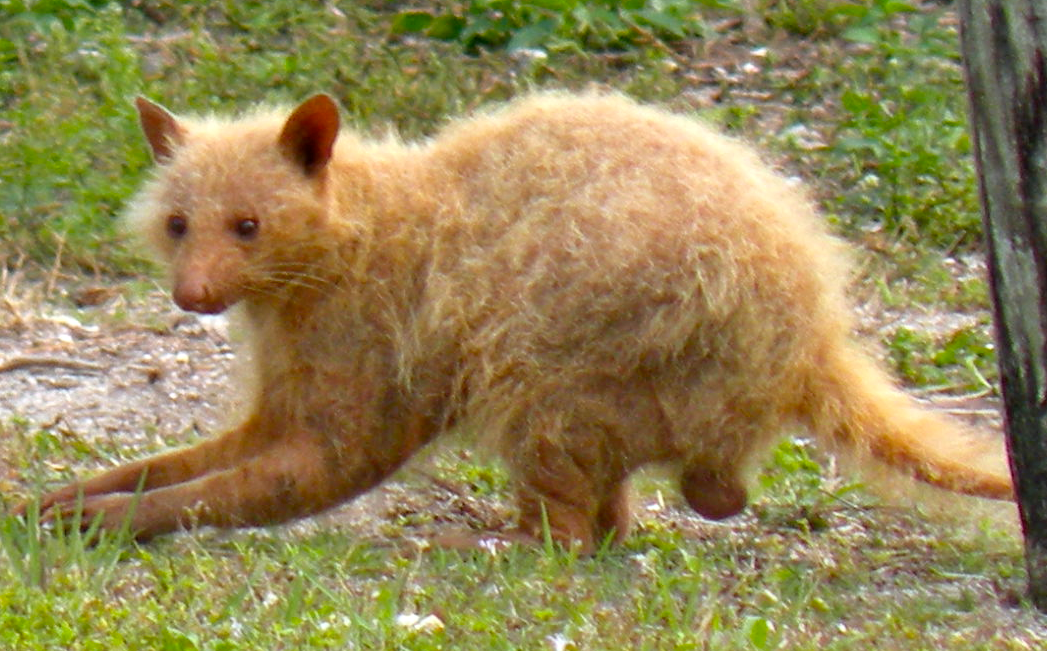
An albino Florida raccoon (P. l. elucus) in Virginia Key, Florida

Raccoons are common throughout North America from Canada to Panama, where the subspecies Procyon lotor pumilus coexists with the crab-eating raccoon (Procyon cancrivorus). The population on Hispaniola was exterminated by Spanish colonists who hunted them for their meat; the historian Oviedo said in 1513 that they were extirpated. Raccoons were also exterminated in Cuba and Jamaica; the last sighting in Jamaica was reported in 1687. The Barbados raccoon became extinct relatively recently, with the last sighting in 1964. When they were still considered separate species, the Bahamas raccoon, Guadeloupe raccoon, and Tres Marias raccoon were classified as endangered by the IUCN in 1996.

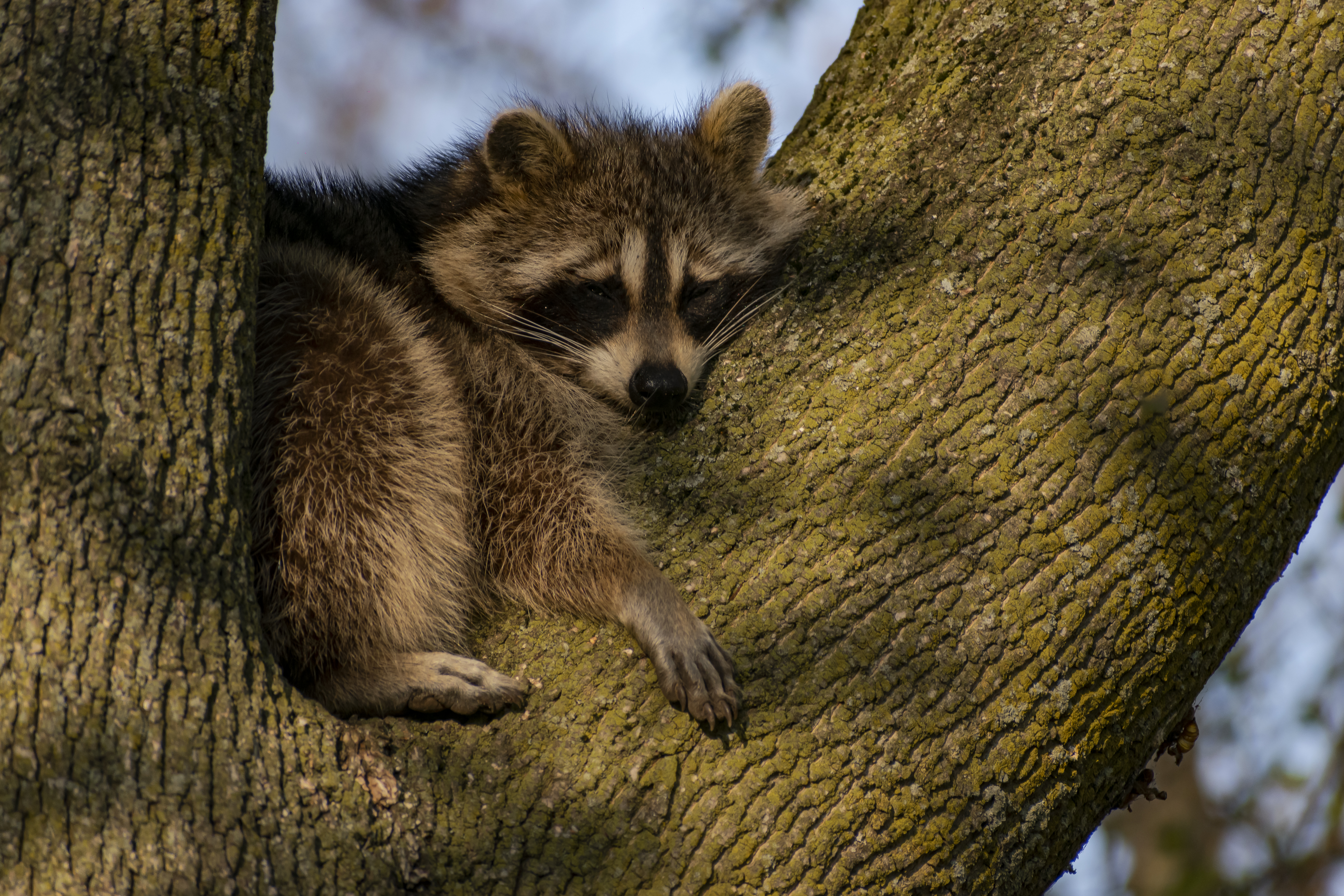
A raccoon sleeping on a tree in High Park, Toronto

In Colonial America, raccoons were uncommon outside the Eastern United States, the Gulf Coast, and the Great Lakes region. As raccoons were not mentioned in earlier reports of pioneers exploring the central and north-central parts of the United States, their initial spread may have begun a few decades before the 20th century. Since the 1950s, raccoons have expanded their range from Vancouver Island—formerly the northernmost limit of their range—far into the northern portions of the four south-central Canadian provinces. New habitats which have recently been occupied by raccoons (aside from urban areas) include mountain ranges, such as the Western Rocky Mountains, prairies, and coastal marshes. After a population explosion starting in the 1940s, the estimated number of raccoons in North America in the late 1980s was 15 to 20 times higher than in the 1930s, when raccoons were comparatively rare. Urbanization, the expansion of agriculture, deliberate introductions, and the extermination of natural predators of the raccoon have probably caused this increase in abundance and distribution.

=== Distribution outside North America ===
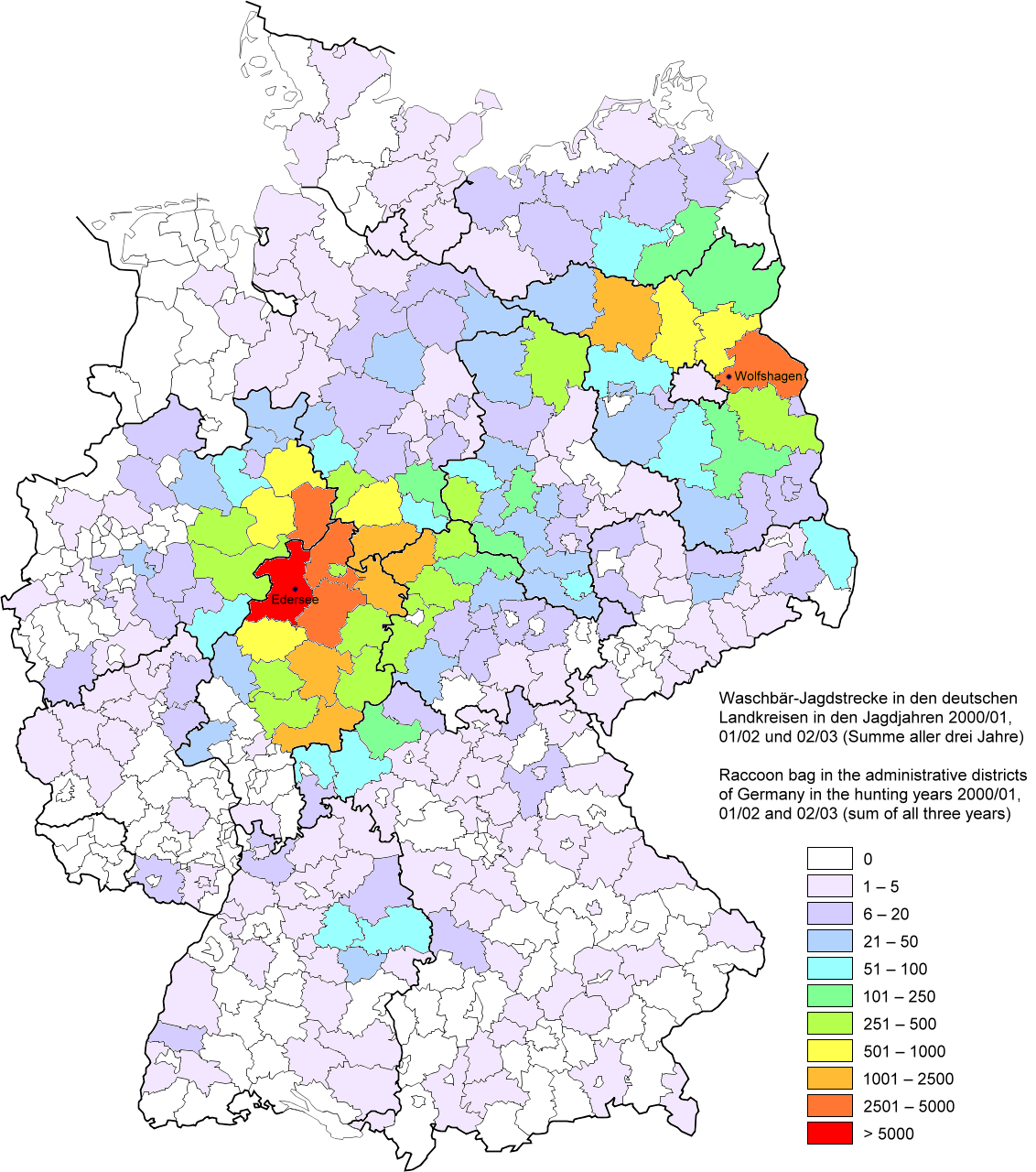
Distribution in Germany: Raccoons killed or found dead by hunters in the hunting years 2000–2001, 2001–2002 and 2002–2003 in the administrative districts of Germany

As a result of escapes and deliberate introductions in the mid-20th century, the raccoon is now distributed in several European and Asian countries. Sightings have occurred in all the countries bordering Germany, which hosts the largest population outside of North America. Another stable population exists in northern France, where several pet raccoons were released by members of the U.S. Air Force near the Laon-Couvron Air Base in 1966. Furthermore, raccoons have been known to be in the area around Madrid since the early 1970s. In 2013, the city authorized "the capture and death of any specimen". It is also present in Italy, with one self-sustaining population in Lombardy.

About 1,240 animals were released in nine regions of the former Soviet Union between 1936 and 1958 to establish a population to be hunted for their fur. Two of these introductions were successful – one in the south of Belarus between 1954 and 1958, and another in Azerbaijan between 1941 and 1957. With a seasonal harvest of between 1,000~1,500 animals, in 1974 the estimated size of the population distributed in the Caucasus region was around 20,000 animals, and the density was four animals per square kilometer (10 animals per square mile).

==== Distribution in Japan ====
In Japan, up to 1,500 raccoons were imported as pets each year after the success of the anime series Rascal the Raccoon (1977). In 2004, the descendants of discarded or escaped animals lived in 42 of 47 prefectures. The range of raccoons in the wild in Japan grew from 17 prefectures in 2000 to all 47 prefectures in 2008. It is estimated that raccoons cause thirty million yen (~$275,000) of agricultural damage on Hokkaido alone.

==== Distribution in Germany ====
In Germany – where the raccoon is called the Waschbär (literally, 'wash-bear' or 'washing bear') due to its habit of "dousing" food in water – two pairs of pet raccoons were released into the German countryside at the Edersee reservoir in the north of Hesse in April 1934 by a forester upon request of their owner, a poultry farmer. He released them two weeks before receiving permission from the Prussian hunting office to "enrich the fauna". Several prior attempts to introduce raccoons in Germany had been unsuccessful. A second population was established in eastern Germany in 1945 when 25 raccoons escaped from a fur farm at Wolfshagen (today a district of Altlandsberg), east of Berlin, after an air strike. The two populations are parasitologically distinguishable: 70% of the raccoons of the Hessian population are infected with the roundworm Baylisascaris procyonis, but none of the Brandenburgian population is known to have the parasite. In the Hessian region, there were an estimated 285 raccoons in 1956, which increased to over 20,000 in 1970; in 2008, there were between 200,000 and 400,000 raccoons in the whole of Germany. By 2012 it was estimated that Germany now had more than a million raccoons.

The raccoon was once a protected species in Germany, but has been declared a game animal in 14 of the 16 German states since 1954. Hunters and environmentalists argue the raccoon spreads uncontrollably, threatens protected bird species, and supersedes indigenous competitors. This view is opposed by the zoologist Frank-Uwe Michler, who finds no evidence that a high population density of raccoons leads to negative effects on the biodiversity of an area. Hohmann holds that extensive hunting cannot be justified by the absence of natural predators, because predation is not a significant cause of death in the North American raccoon population.

The raccoon is extensively hunted in Germany as it is seen as an invasive species and pest. In the 1990s, only about 400 raccoons were hunted yearly. This increased dramatically over the next quarter-century: during the 2015–2016 hunting season, 128,100 raccoons were hunted, 60 percent of them in the state of Hesse.

Raccoon population in Germany by year

Year	Pop.	±%
2006	30,230	—
2007	24,800	−18.0%
2008	36,570	+47.5%
2009	54,790	+49.8%
2010	49,785	−9.1%
2011	67,700	+36.0%

Year	Pop.	±%
2012	71,070	+5.0%
2013	104,370	+46.9%
2014	96,165	−7.9%
2015	116,070	+20.7%
2016	128,100	+10.4%

Source data

==== Distribution in the former Soviet Union ====
Experiments in acclimatising raccoons into the Soviet Union began in 1936, and were repeated a further 25 times until 1962. Overall, 1,222 individuals were released, 64 of which came from zoos and fur farms (38 of them having been imports from Western Europe). The remainder originated from a population previously established in Transcaucasia. The range of Soviet raccoons was never single or continuous, as they were often introduced to different locations far from each other. All introductions into the Russian Far East failed; melanistic raccoons were released on Petrov Island near Vladivostok and some areas of southern Primorsky Krai, but died. In Central Asia, raccoons were released in Kyrgyzstan's Jalal-Abad Province, though they were later recorded as "practically absent" there in January 1963. A large and stable raccoon population (yielding 1,000~1,500 catches a year) was established in Azerbaijan after an introduction to the area in 1937. Raccoons survived an introduction near Terek, along the Sulak River into the Dagestani lowlands. Attempts to settle raccoons on the Kuban River's left tributary and Kabardino-Balkaria were unsuccessful. A successful acclimatization occurred in Belarus, where three introductions (consisting of 52, 37, and 38 individuals in 1954 and 1958) took place. By January 1963, 700 individuals were recorded in the country.

=== Urban raccoons ===
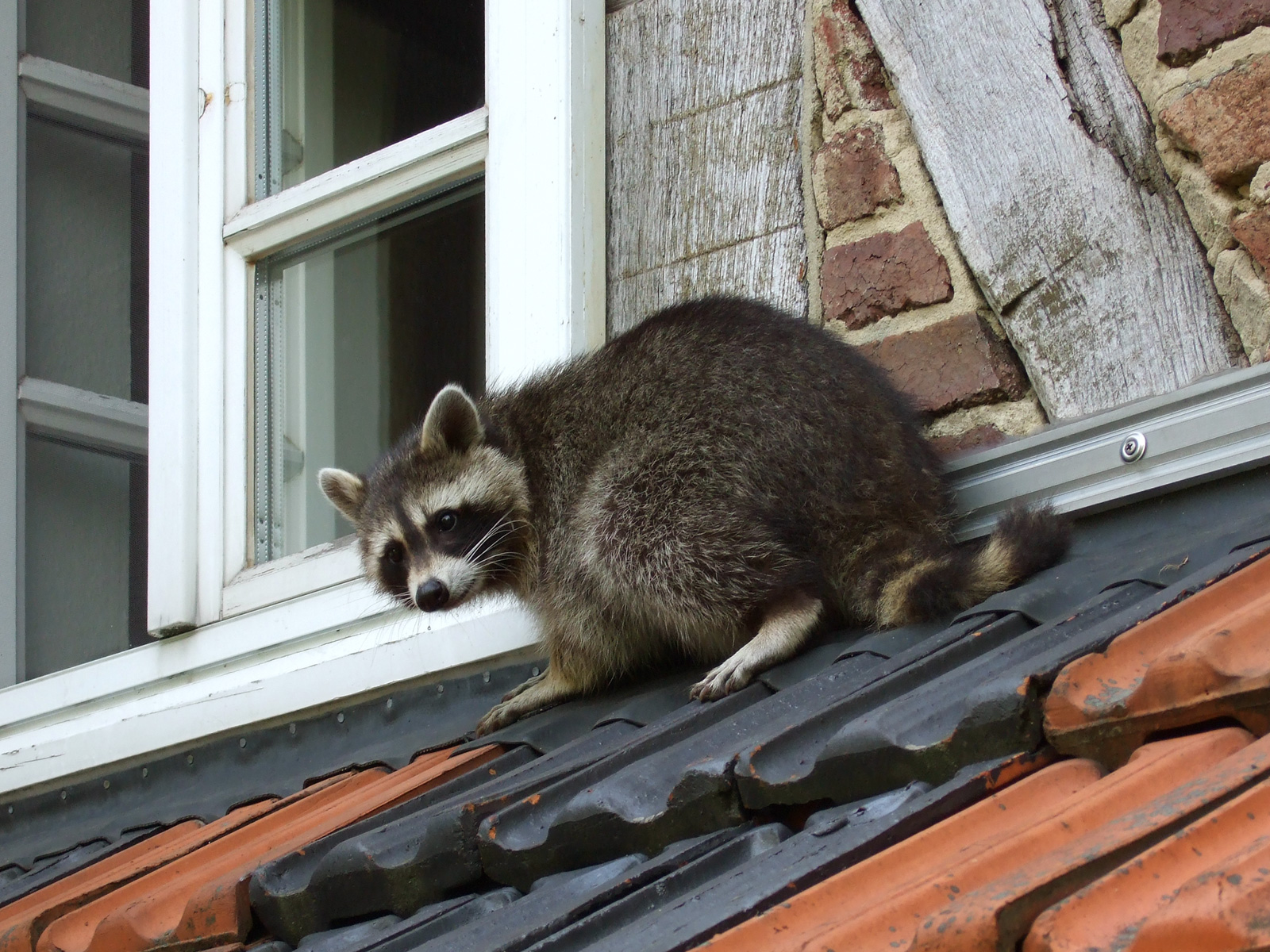
On the roof of a house in Albertshausen, Germany

Due to its adaptability, the raccoon has been able to use urban areas as a habitat. The first sightings were recorded in a suburb of Cincinnati in the 1920s. Since the 1950s, raccoons have been present in metropolitan areas like Washington, D.C., Chicago, Toronto, and New York City. Since the 1960s, Kassel has hosted Europe's first and densest population in a large urban area, with about 50 to 150 animals per square kilometer (130 to 390 animals per square mile), a figure comparable to those of urban habitats in North America. Home range sizes of urban raccoons are only 3 to 40 hectares (7.5 to 100 acres) for females and 8 to 80 hectares (20 to 200 acres) for males. In small towns and suburbs, many raccoons sleep in a nearby forest after foraging in the settlement area. Fruit and insects in gardens and leftovers in municipal waste are easily available food sources. Furthermore, a large number of additional sleeping areas exist in these areas, such as hollows in old garden trees, cottages, garages, abandoned houses, and attics. The percentage of urban raccoons sleeping in abandoned or occupied houses varies from 15% in Washington, DC (1991) to 43% in Kassel (2003).

== Health ==
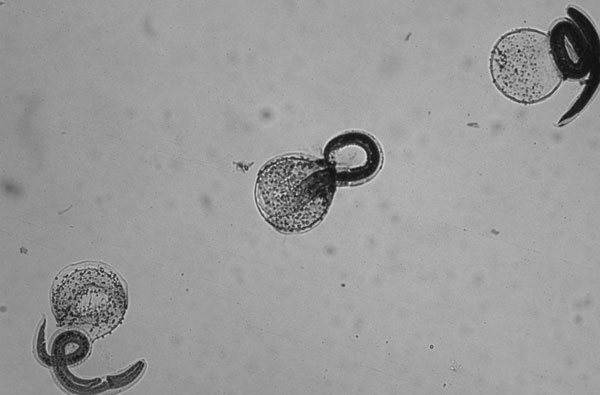
Raccoon roundworm Baylisascaris procyonis larvae

Raccoons can carry rabies, a lethal disease caused by the neurotropic rabies virus carried in the saliva and transmitted by bites. Its spread began in Florida in the 1950s and was facilitated by the introduction of infected individuals to Virginia in the late 1970s. Of the 6,940 documented rabies cases reported in the United States in 2006, 2,615 (37.7%) were in raccoons. The U.S. Department of Agriculture, as well as local authorities in several U.S. states and Canadian provinces, has developed oral vaccination programs to fight the spread of the disease in endangered populations. The first human fatality attributed to the rabies virus strain commonly known as "raccoon rabies" was recorded in 2003. Among the main symptoms for rabies in raccoons are a generally sickly appearance, impaired mobility, abnormal vocalization, and aggressiveness. There may be no visible signs at all, however, and most individuals do not show the aggressive behavior seen in infected canids; rabid raccoons will often retire to their dens instead. Organizations like the U.S. Forest Service encourage people to stay away from animals with unusual behavior or appearance, and to notify the proper authorities, such as an animal control officer from the local health department. Since healthy animals, especially nursing mothers, will occasionally forage during the day, daylight activity is not a reliable indicator of illness in raccoons.

Unlike rabies and at least a dozen other pathogens carried by raccoons, distemper, an epizootic virus, does not affect humans. This disease is the most frequent natural cause of death in the North American raccoon population and affects individuals of all age groups. For example, 94 of 145 raccoons died during an outbreak in Clifton, Ohio in 1968. It may occur along with a following inflammation of the brain (encephalitis), causing the animal to display rabies-like symptoms. In Germany, the first eight cases of distemper were reported in 2007.

Some of the most important bacterial diseases which affect raccoons are leptospirosis, listeriosis, tetanus, and tularemia. Although internal parasites weaken their immune systems, well-fed individuals can carry a great many roundworms in their digestive tracts without showing symptoms. The larvae of the roundworm Baylisascaris procyonis, which can be contained in the feces and seldom causes a severe illness in humans, can be ingested when cleaning raccoon latrines without wearing breathing protection. While not endemic, the worm Trichinella does infect raccoons, and undercooked raccoon meat has caused trichinosis in humans. Trematode Metorchis conjunctus can also infect raccoons.

== Relationship with humans ==
=== Conflicts ===
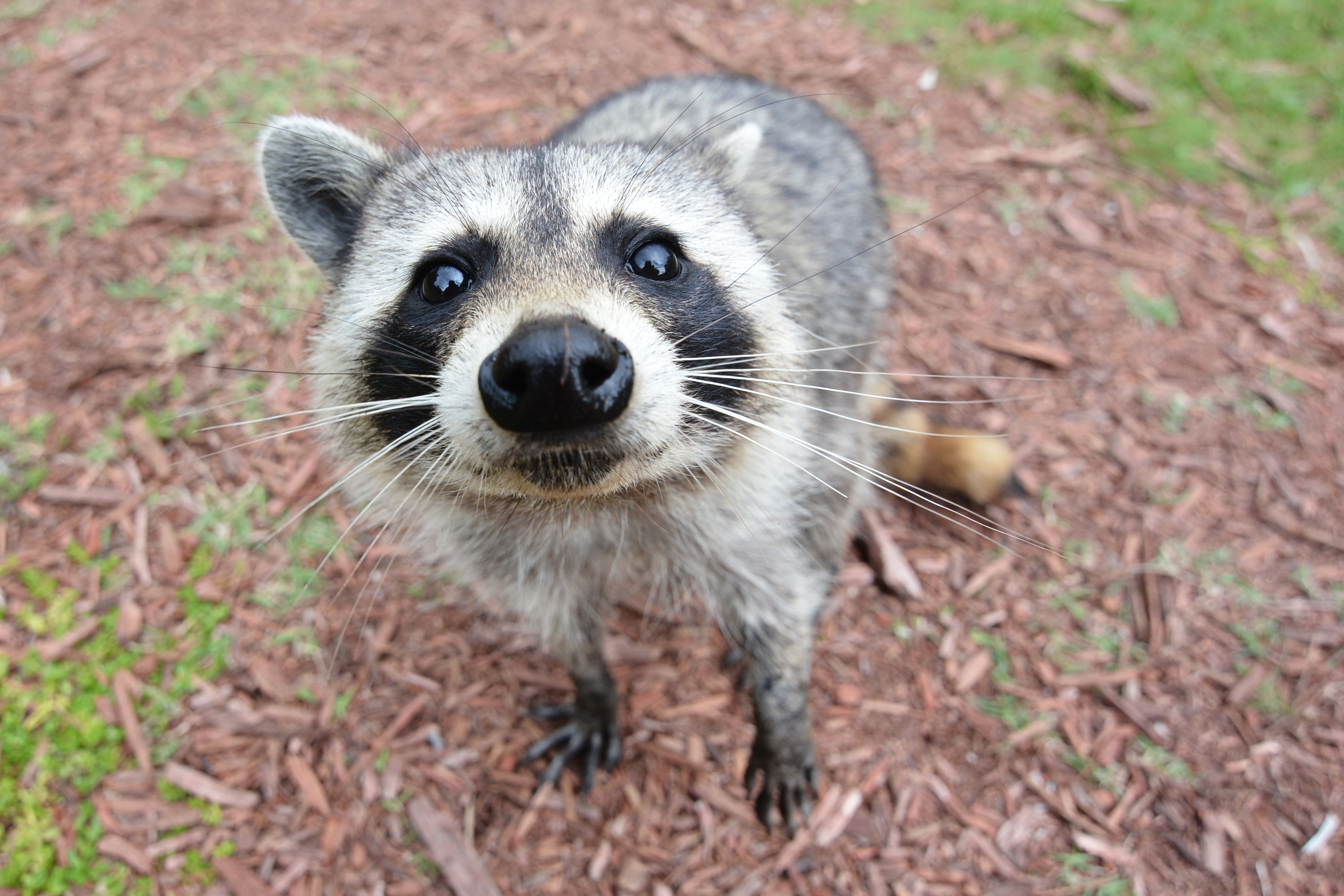
A Florida raccoon (P. l. elucus) in the Everglades approaches a group of humans, hoping to be fed

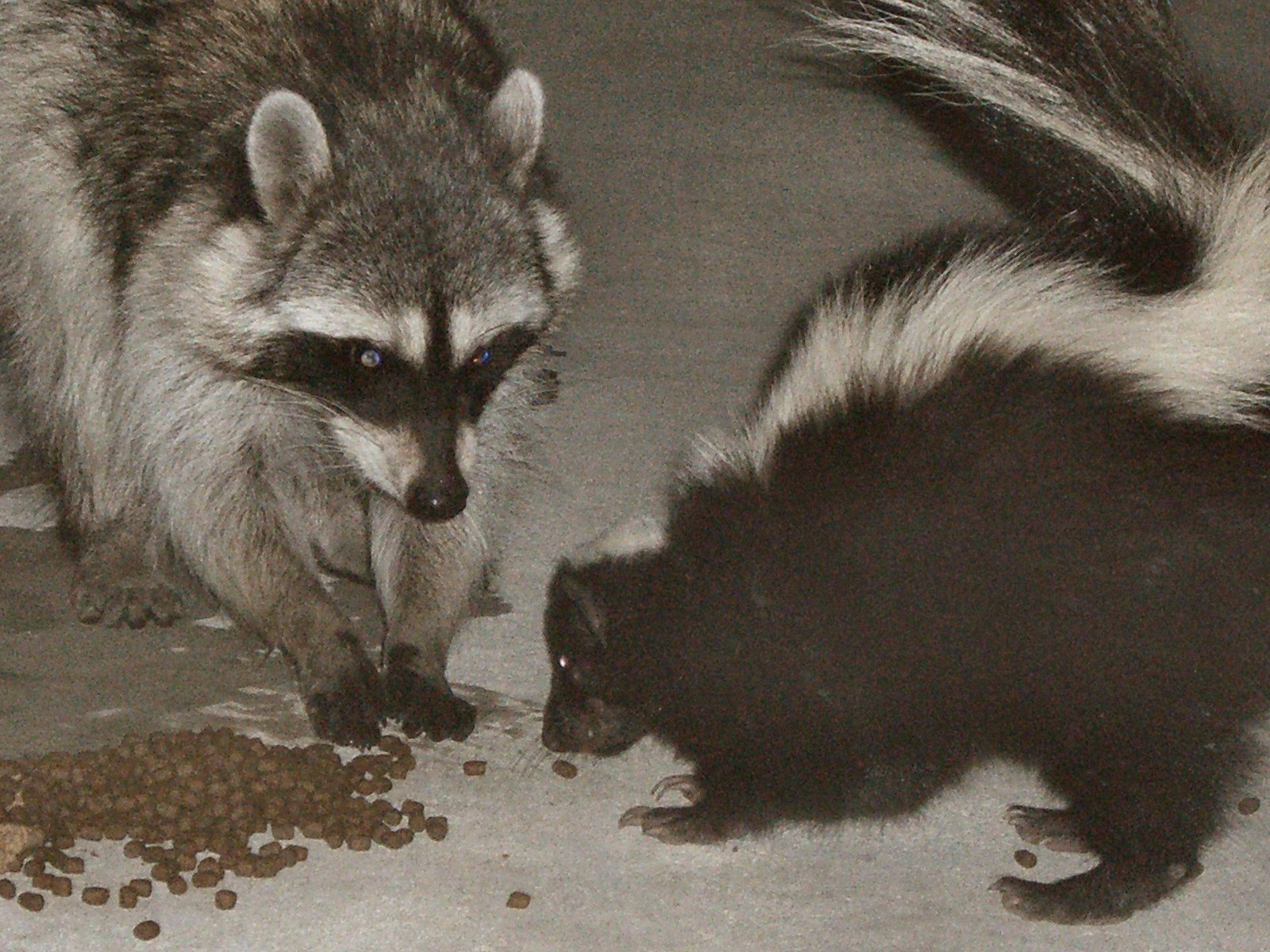
A skunk and a California raccoon (P. l. psora) share cat food morsels in a Hollywood, California backyard

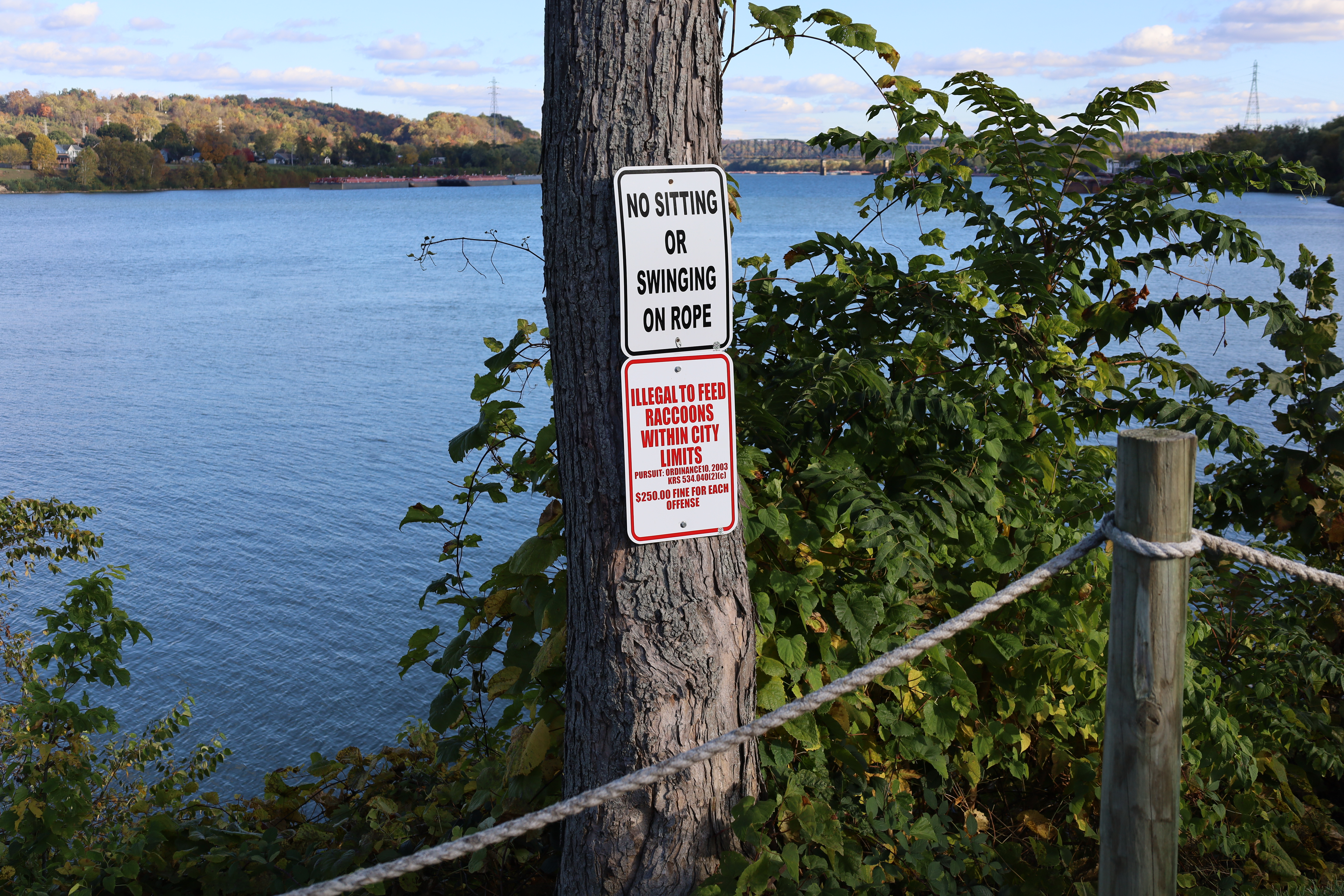
A sign in Catlettsburg, Kentucky advising that it is illegal to feed raccoons within that city

Raccoons have become notorious in urban areas for consuming food waste. They possess impressive problem-solving abilities and can break into all but the most secure food waste bins, which has earned them the nickname "trash panda". The presence of raccoons near humans may be undesirable, as raccoon droppings, like those of most wild animals, contain parasites and other disease vectors. Raccoon roundworm is of particular concern to public health. It can be contracted in humans by accidental ingestion or inhalation of the eggs, which are present in the feces of infected raccoons. While usually harmless to the host, it causes progressive neurological damage in humans and is eventually fatal if untreated. It is found in about 60% of adult raccoons. The general presence of raccoons in an area is not typically of concern, but nests or droppings found within or near structures should be destroyed. Roundworm eggs are very robust, and bleach alone is insufficient; burning or treatment with hot solutions of sodium hydroxide is required. The keeping of raccoons as pets is illegal in some jurisdictions due to these risks.

The increasing number of raccoons in urban areas has resulted in diverse reactions in humans, ranging from outrage at their presence to deliberate feeding. Some wildlife experts and most public authorities caution against feeding wild animals, because they might become increasingly obtrusive and dependent on humans as a food source. Other experts challenge such arguments and advise on feeding raccoons and other wildlife in their books. Raccoons without a fear of humans are a concern to those who attribute this trait to rabies, but scientists point out this behavior is much more likely to be a behavioral adjustment to living in habitats with regular contact to humans for many generations. Raccoons usually do not prey on domestic cats and dogs, but isolated cases of killings have been reported. Attacks on pets may also target their owners.

While overturned waste containers and raided fruit trees are just a nuisance to homeowners, it can cost several thousand dollars to repair damage caused by the use of attic space as dens. Relocating or killing raccoons without a permit is forbidden in many urban areas on grounds of animal welfare. These methods usually only solve problems with particularly wild or aggressive individuals, since adequate dens are either known to several raccoons or will quickly be rediscovered. Loud noises, flashing lights, and unpleasant odors have proven particularly effective in driving away a mother and her kits before they would normally leave the nesting place (when the kits are about eight weeks old). Typically, though, only precautionary measures to restrict access to food waste and den sites are effective in the long term.

Among all fruits and crops cultivated in agricultural areas, sweet corn in its milk stage is particularly popular among raccoons. In a two-year study by Purdue University researchers, published in 2004, raccoons were responsible for 87% of the damage to corn plants. Like other predators, raccoons searching for food can break into poultry houses to feed on chickens, ducks, their eggs, or food.

=== Mythology, arts, and entertainment ===
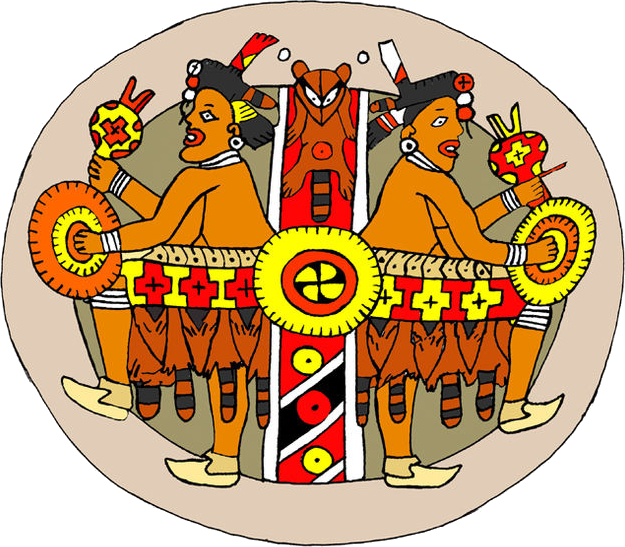
Stylized raccoon skin as depicted on the Raccoon Priests gorget found at Spiro Mounds

In the mythology of the Indigenous peoples of the Americas, the raccoon is the subject of folk tales. Stories such as "How raccoons catch so many crayfish" from the Tuscarora centered on its skills at foraging. In other tales, the raccoon played the role of the trickster, which outsmarts other animals, like coyotes and wolves. Among others, the Dakota believe the raccoon has natural spirit powers, since its mask resembles the facial paintings, two-fingered swashes of black and white, used during rituals to connect to spirit beings. The Aztecs linked supernatural abilities especially to females, whose commitment to their young was associated with the role of wise women in their society.

The raccoon also appears in Native American art across a wide geographic range. Petroglyphs with engraved raccoon tracks were found in Lewis Canyon, Texas; at the Crow Hollow petroglyph site in Grayson County, Kentucky; and in river drainages near Tularosa, the San Francisco River of New Mexico and Arizona. The meaning and significance of the Raccoon Priests Gorget, which features a stylized carving of a raccoon and was found at the Spiro Mounds, Oklahoma, remains unknown.

=== Hunting and fur trade ===
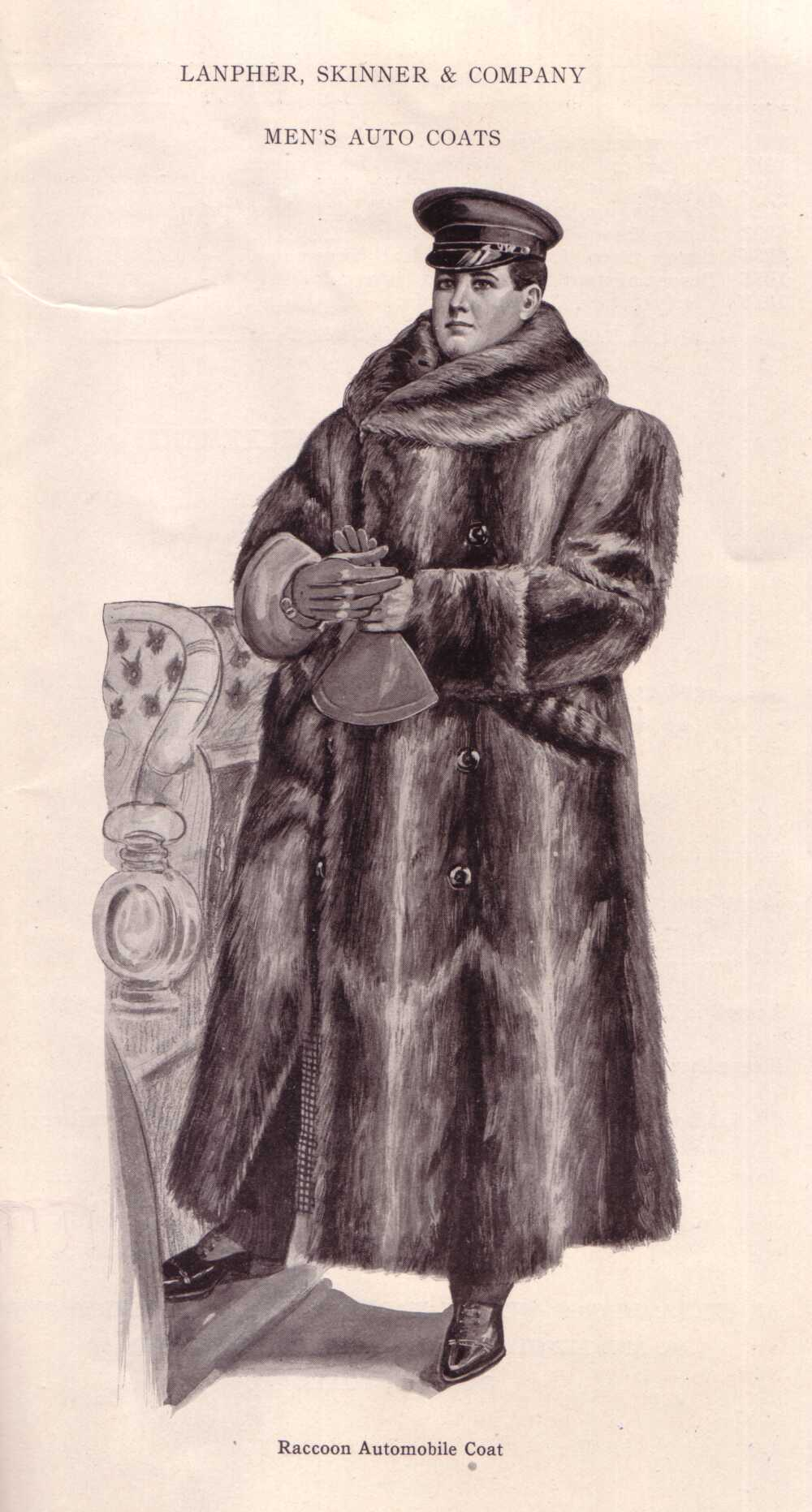
Automobile coat made out of raccoon fur (1906, U.S.)

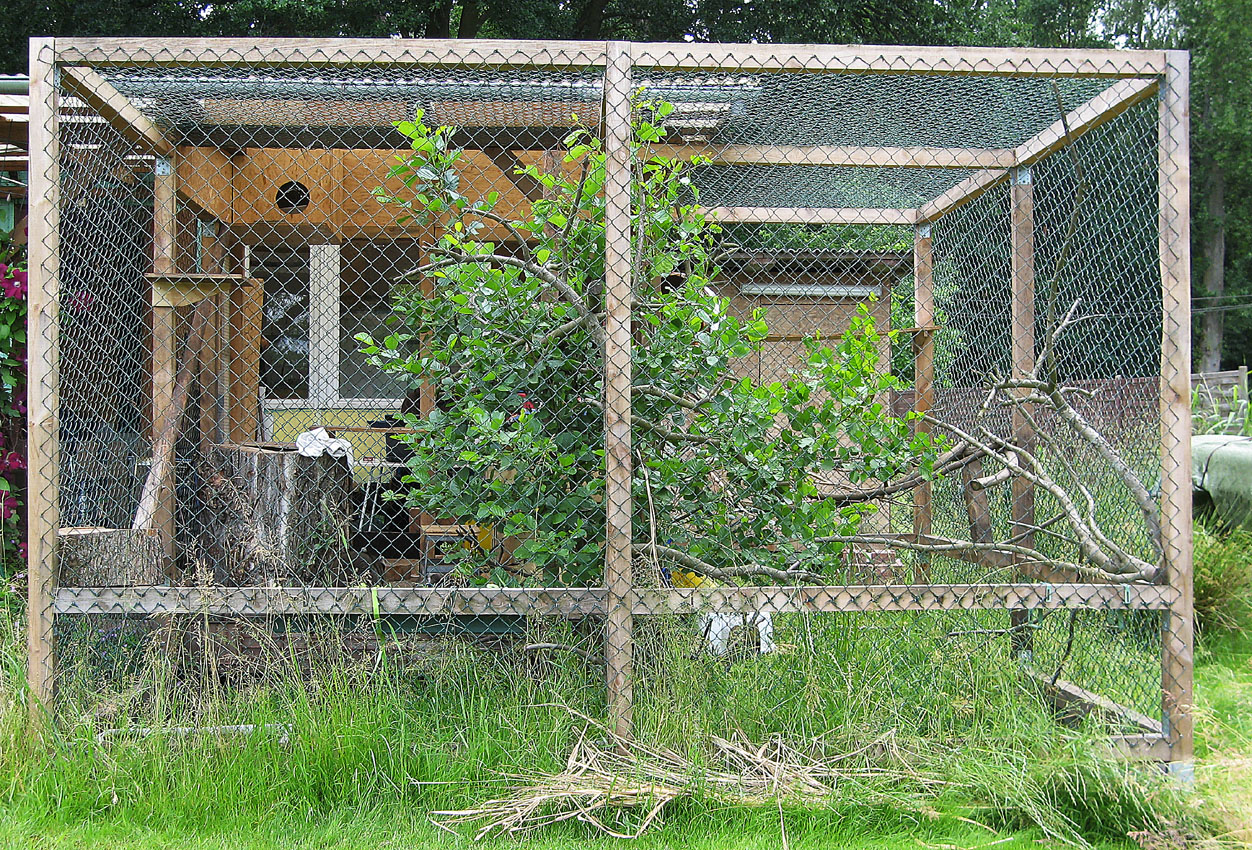
Pen with climbing facilities, hiding places, and a watering hole (lower-left-side)

The fur of raccoons is used for clothing, especially for coats and coonskin caps. At present, it is the material used for the inaccurately named "sealskin" cap worn by the Royal Fusiliers of Great Britain. Sporrans made of raccoon pelt and hide have sometimes been used as part of traditional Scottish highland men's apparel since the 18th century, especially in North America. Such sporrans may or may not be of the "full-mask" type. Historically, Native American tribes not only used the fur for winter clothing, but also used the tails for ornament. The famous Sioux leader Spotted Tail took his name from a raccoon skin hat with the tail attached he acquired from a fur trader. Since the late 18th century, various types of scent hounds, called coonhounds, which can tree animals have been bred in the United States. In the 19th century, when coonskins occasionally even served as means of payment, several thousand raccoons were killed each year in the United States. This number rose quickly when automobile coats became popular after the turn of the 20th century. In the 1920s, wearing a raccoon coat was regarded as a status symbol among college students. Attempts to breed raccoons in fur farms in the 1920s and 1930s in North America and Europe turned out not to be profitable, and farming was abandoned after prices for long-haired pelts dropped in the 1940s. Although raccoons had become rare in the 1930s, at least 388,000 were killed during the hunting season of 1934–1935.

After persistent population increases began in the 1940s, the seasonal coon hunting harvest reached about one million animals in 1946–1947 and two million in 1962–1963. The broadcast of three television episodes about the frontiersman Davy Crockett and the film Davy Crockett, King of the Wild Frontier in 1954 and 1955 led to a high demand for coonskin caps in the United States, although it is unlikely Crockett actually wore a cap made from raccoon fur. The seasonal hunt reached an all-time high with 5.2 million animals in 1976–1977 and ranged between 3.2 and 4.7 million for most of the 1980s. In 1982, the average pelt price was $20. As of 1987, the raccoon was identified as the most important wild furbearer in North America in terms of revenue. In the first half of the 1990s, the seasonal hunt dropped to 0.9 from 1.9 million due to decreasing pelt prices.

=== Food ===
While primarily hunted for their fur, raccoons were also a source of food for Native Americans and early American settlers. According to Ernest Thompson Seton, young specimens killed without a fight are palatable, whereas old raccoons caught after a lengthy battle are inedible. Raccoon meat was extensively eaten during the early years of California, where it was sold in the San Francisco market for $1–3 apiece. American slaves occasionally ate raccoon at Christmas, but it was not necessarily a dish of the poor or rural. The first edition of The Joy of Cooking, released in 1931, contained a recipe for preparing raccoon, and US President Calvin Coolidge's pet raccoon Rebecca was originally sent to be served at the White House Thanksgiving Dinner.

Although the idea of eating raccoons may seem repulsive to most mainstream consumers, who see them as endearing, cute, or vermin, several thousand raccoons are still eaten each year in the United States, primarily in the Southern United States. Some people tout the taste of the meat.

=== Other uses ===
In addition to the fur and meat, the raccoon baculum (penis bone) have had numerous traditional uses in the Southern United States and beyond. Indigenous people used the bones as a pipe cleaning tool. The bones were used by moonshine distillers to guide the flow of whiskey from the drip tube to the bottle. With their tips filed down, the bones were used as toothpicks under the moniker "coon rods". (Note: Other nicknames were "Alabama toothpick", "Arkansas toothpick", "mountain man toothpick" and "Texas toothpick".) In hoodoo, the folk magic of the American South, the baculum is sometimes worn as an amulet for love or luck. The bones also have decorative uses (e.g. on the trademark hat of stock car racer Richard Petty or as earrings by actresses Sarah Jessica Parker and Vanessa Williams).

=== Pet raccoons ===
Raccoons are sometimes kept as pets, which is discouraged by many experts because the raccoon is not a domesticated species. Raccoons may act unpredictably and aggressively, and it is extremely difficult to teach them to obey commands. In places where keeping raccoons as pets is not forbidden, such as in Wisconsin and other U.S. states, an exotic pet permit may be required. One notable pet raccoon was Rebecca, kept by US president Calvin Coolidge.

Their propensity for unruly behavior exceeds that of captive skunks, and they are even less trustworthy when allowed to roam freely. Because of their intelligence and nimble forelimbs, even inexperienced raccoons are easily capable of unscrewing jars, uncorking bottles and opening door latches, with more experienced specimens having been recorded to open door knobs. Sexually mature raccoons often show aggressive natural behaviors such as biting during the mating season. Neutering them at around five or six months of age decreases the chances of aggressive behavior developing. Raccoons can become obese and suffer from other disorders due to poor diet and lack of exercise. When fed with cat food over a long time period, raccoons can develop gout. Due to research regarding their social behavior, it is now forbidden by law in Austria and Germany to keep only one raccoon, to prevent loneliness. Raccoons are usually kept in a pen (indoor or outdoor), also a legal requirement in Austria and Germany, rather than in the apartment where their natural curiosity may result in damage to property.

When orphaned, it is possible for kits to be rehabilitated and reintroduced to the wild. However, it is uncertain whether they readapt well to life in the wild. Feeding unweaned kits with cow's milk rather than a kitten replacement milk or a similar product can be dangerous to their health.

=== Local and indigenous names ===
Local and Indigenous names for Procyon lotor
Linguistic group or area	Local / Indigenous name
Canadian French	Raton laveur
Cayuga	sá:no:ˀ
Choco	Touaru
Cocopah	NYmaṣ
Cree	ᐱᓯᐢᑫᐢ (pisiskês) ᐅᒋᑯᒼᓯᐢ (ocikomsis)
Cree (Swampy and Woods)	kimociškw-
Creek	Wot•ko
Lakota	wičhítegleǧa, wičhá
Lenape	Nahënëm
Louisiana French	Chaoui
Mayan	Culu
Mi'kmaq	amaljugwej
Miskito	Suksuk
Mohawk	atí:ronh
Nahuatl	Mapachitli
Navajo	Tábąąh mą'ii
Nez Perce	K'ayk'áyoc
Oglala Lakota	Wee'-cha
Ojibwe	Esiban
Omaha–Ponca	miká
Oneida	ʌti·lú
Onondaga	jyo’ä́·gak or jyo’éägak
Pawnee	Icat
Seneca	dzo’ä:ga’
Spanish	Mapache; Mapachín; Tejón; Gato manglatero
Tuscarora	rusá·tu·ˀ
Wintu	Qari•lit
Yankton Dakota	Way-atch-a

== See also ==
- Cozumel raccoon, an endangered species in the Yucatán Peninsula
- Crab-eating raccoon, of Central and South America, eats crustaceans amongst other things
- Raccoon dog, native to East Asia
- Mexican raccoon, native to Mexico and much of Central America

== General and cited sources ==
- Bartussek, Ingo (2004). Die Waschbären kommen (in German). Niedenstein, Germany: Cognitio. ISBN 978-3-932583-10-0.
- Goldman, Edward A.; Jackson, Hartley H.T. (1950). Raccoons of North and Middle America. North American Fauna. Vol. 60. Washington: U.S. Department of the Interior, Fish and Wildlife Service – via Internet Archive.
- Heptner, V.G.; Sludskii, A.A. (2002). Mammals of the Soviet Union. Vol. II, part 1b, Carnivores (Mustelidae & Procyonidae). Washington, D.C.: Smithsonian Institution Libraries and National Science Foundation. ISBN 978-90-04-08876-4 – via Internet Archive.
- Hohmann, Ulf; Bartussek, Ingo; Böer, Bernhard (2001). Der Waschbär (in German). Reutlingen, Germany: Oertel+Spörer. ISBN 978-3-88627-301-0.
- Holmgren, Virginia C. (1990). Raccoons in Folklore, History and Today's Backyards. Santa Barbara, California: Capra Press. ISBN 978-0-88496-312-7.
- Lagoni-Hansen, Anke (1981). Der Waschbär (in German). Mainz, Germany: Verlag Dieter Hoffmann. ISBN 978-3-87341-037-4.
- MacClintock, Dorcas (1981). A Natural History of Raccoons. Caldwell, New Jersey: Blackburn Press. ISBN 978-1-930665-67-5.
- Seton, Ernest Thompson (1909). Life-histories of northern animals: an account of the mammals of Manitoba. New York City: Scribner – via Internet Archive.
- Zeveloff, Samuel I. (2002). Raccoons: A Natural History. Washington, D.C.: Smithsonian Books. ISBN 978-1-58834-033-7 – via Internet Archive.
