= Dwarf coati =

Dwarf coati can refer to several species:

- Cozumel Island coati (Nasua narica nelsoni) – from Cozumel Island, Mexico.
- Eastern mountain coati (Nasuella meridensis) – from the Andes in Venezuela.
- Western mountain coati (Nasuella olivacea) – from the Andes in Colombia and Ecuador.
