= Nasua =

- White-nosed coati (Nasua narica)

Scientific classification
- Kingdom: Animalia
- Phylum: Chordata
- Class: Mammalia
- Order: Carnivora
- Family: Procyonidae
- Subtribe: Nasuina
- Genus: Nasua; Storr, 1780

Type species
- Viverra nasua

Species
- Nasua narica; Nasua nasua; †Nasua mastodonta
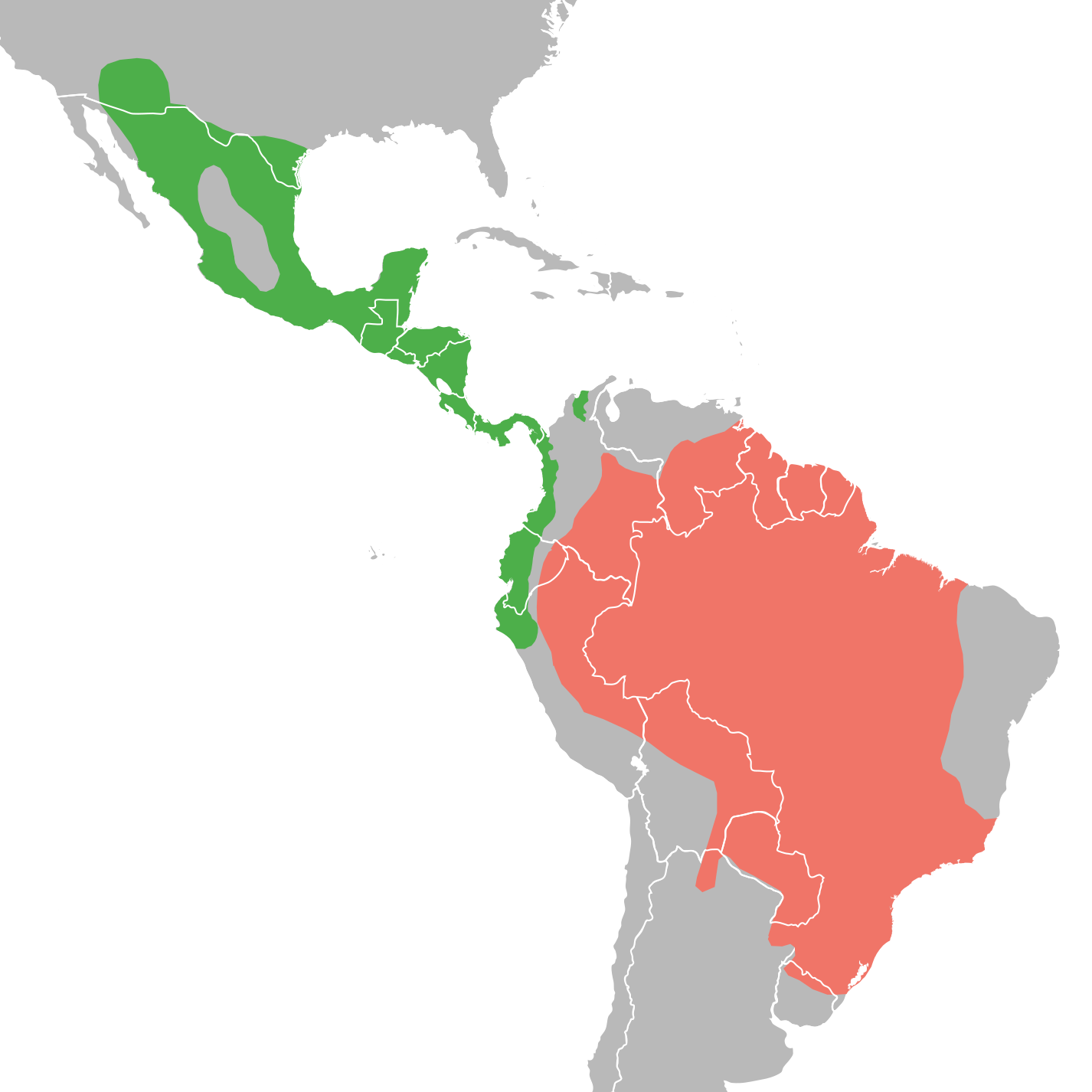
- Nasua distribution N. narica in green, N. nasua in red

Synonyms
- Coati Lacépède, 1799; Mamnasuaus Herrera, 1899; Nasica South, 1845

Genus of carnivores

Nasua is a genus of coatis of the family Procyonidae. Two additional species of coatis, commonly known as mountain coatis, are placed in the genus Nasuella.

== Characteristics ==
Nasua differs from Nasuella in being larger and having larger canine teeth, but preliminary genetic evidence (cytochrome b sequences) suggests that Nasuella should be merged into Nasua. Other genetic studies have shown that the closest relatives of the coatis are the olingos (genus Bassaricyon), from which they diverged about 10.2 million years ago.

== Diet ==
Like other procyonids, coatis are omnivores. Their diet consists largely of insects, insect larvae, spiders and other invertebrates as well as the occasional small vertebrate discovered while foraging in leaf litter. On Barro Colorado Island, Panama, where they have been studied in greatest detail, they supplement this diet with copious amounts of fruit as it becomes available seasonally from favored trees, such as figs (Ficus insipida) and hog plums (Spondias mombin).

== Behavior ==
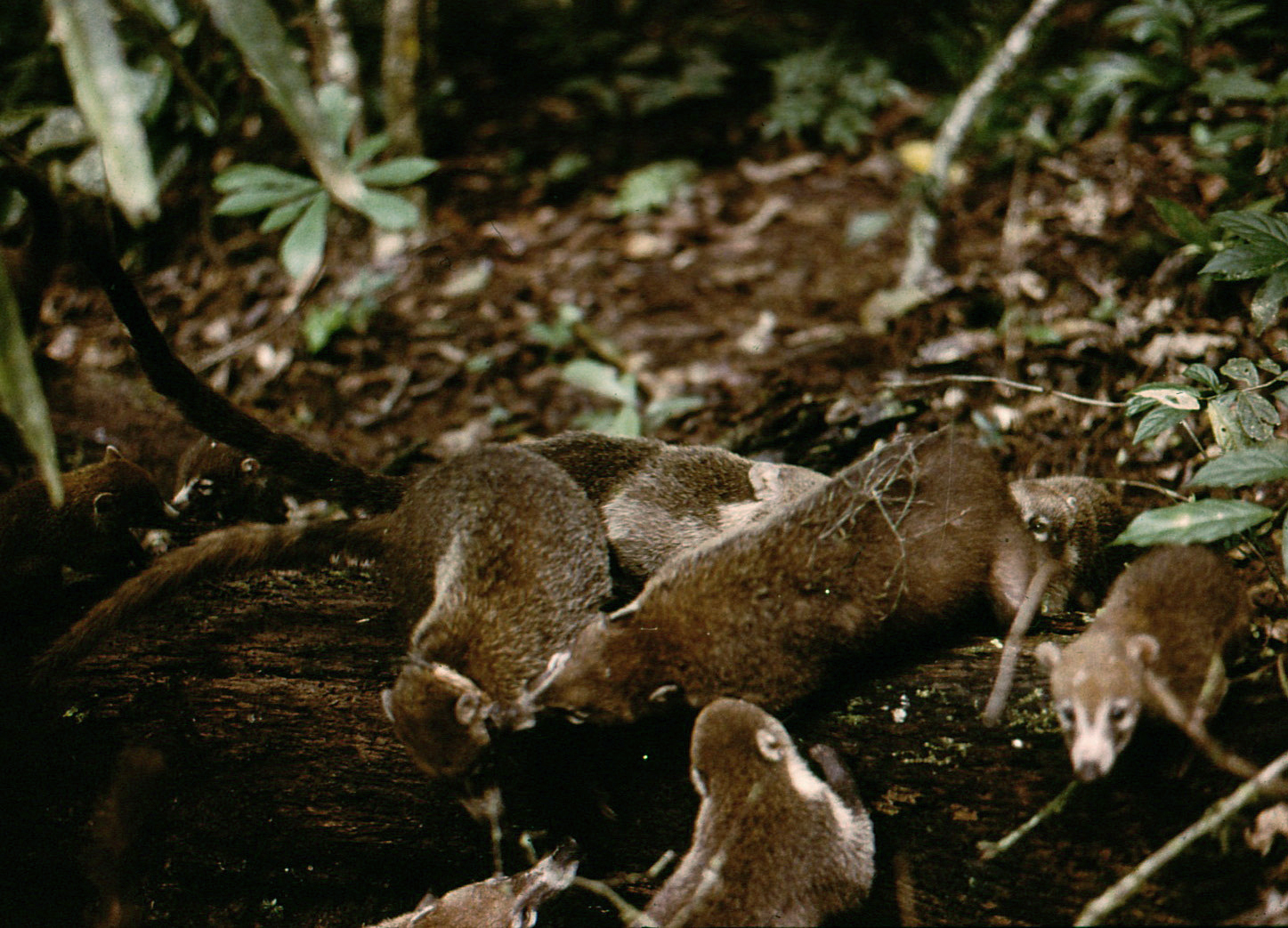
Coati band performing mutual grooming after reaggregation

Their very active foraging behavior appears to be interrelated with their distinctive social organization. Exceptional among procyonids, coatis are diurnal and for much of the year gregarious. Though females nest, and bear and nurse their young in isolation, shortly after the altricial young become mobile the females aggregate into social groups known as bands. Bands consist of adult females (two or more years old), and sub-adults (1–2 years old) and juveniles (less than 1 year old) of both sexes. At maturity, at two years of age, males are excluded from bands and take up a solitary lifestyle. They are aggressively repelled from bands, except during the mating season when typically one male ingratiates himself to a band through submissive behavior, forages with it for a period of a few weeks, and mates with all of the adult females. During the nesting season, the sub-adults and juveniles remain together in bands while breeding adult females become solitary for parturition and nesting. Females begin breeding in their 3rd or 4th year, apparently depending on nutritional status. Occasionally, older females become postreproductive, and these remain with the bands while breeding females separate. Breeding is synchronous, as is parturition and nursing. Resumption of gregarious behavior takes place synchronously as well, over the course of several weeks, depending on the existence of previous social relationships, i.e. females with prior relationships reaggregate into bands more quickly than those forming new relationships. Nonetheless, persistent social bonds may form anew at this point in the reproductive cycle: while there may be a tendency to reaggregate with kin, prior relationships are not indispensable. Previously unfamiliar individuals may aggregate into bands with stable social relationships. A conspicuous means of bond formation is mutual grooming, on which an hour or more may be spent daily. Some of this appears to be ritualized as a form of social bond formation, though it is clearly mutually beneficial as well: the burden of ticks on band members is lower than it is on solitary adult males, for instance.

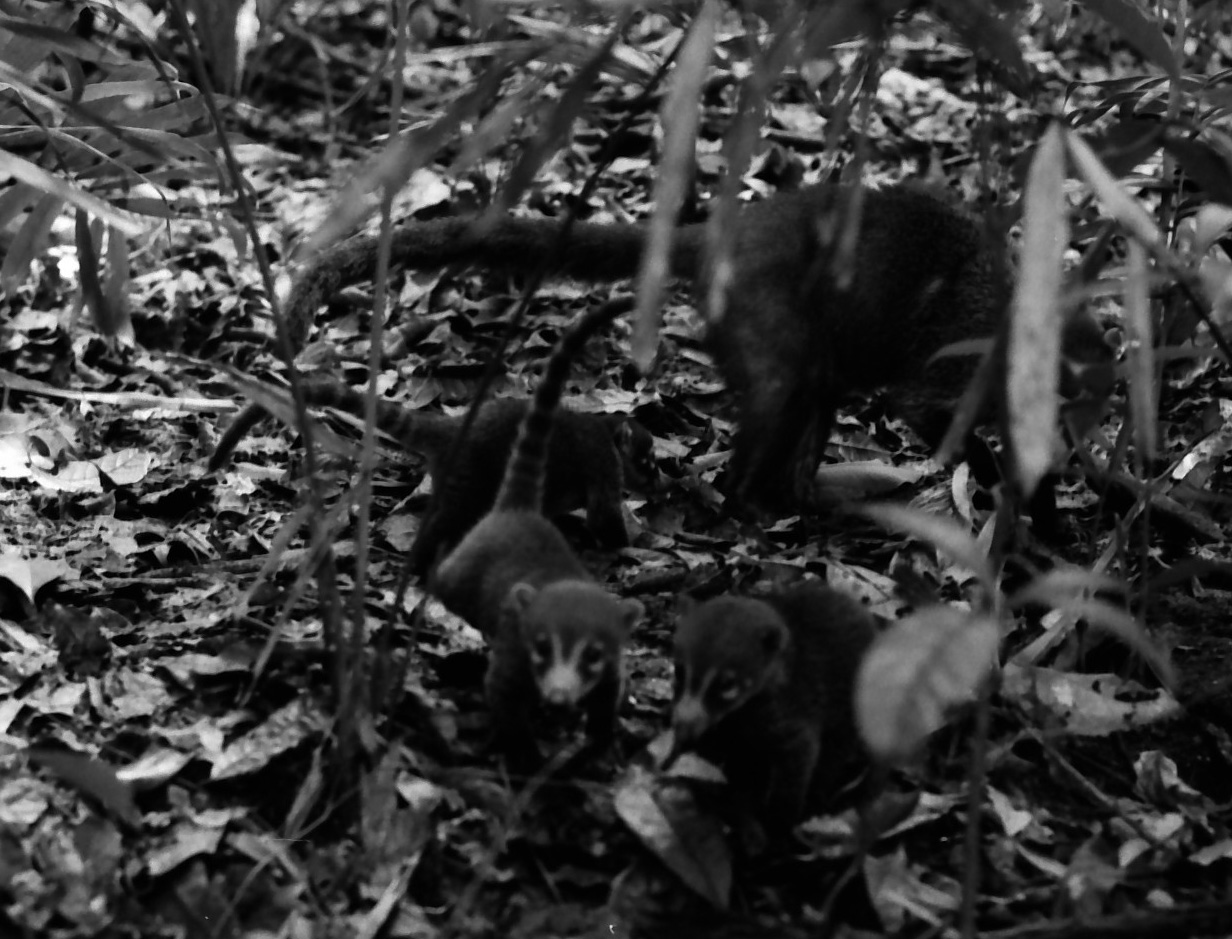
Three infant coatis with their mother

When juveniles descend from the nest, they are little better than helpless. One important benefit of aggregating for the adult females is sharing of vigilance in protection of juveniles from predation. Juvenile mortality is high, sources of peril including adult male coatis which have been observed to kill them. It is not entirely clear whether adult males are preying on them or killing potential rivals, and of course it may be both.

The active foraging behavior of coatis is fairly conspicuous, and requires a considerable degree of attention. The proportion of time that adult females spend foraging increases, and the proportion of foraging time interrupted for stationary vigilance behavior decreases, when aggregation into bands is achieved. Bands forage in formation, with adults and sub-adults distributed around the periphery, and juveniles gathered towards the center. This shared vigilance appears to be an important contributor to the benefit of gregariousness for coatis.

== Species ==
The two species within Nasua are:

Genus Nasua – Storr, 1780 – two species
Common name	Scientific name and subspecies	Range	Size and ecology	IUCN status and estimated population
White-nosed coati, pizote, or antoon	Nasua narica (Linnaeus, 1766) Four subspecies: N. n. narica (Linnaeus, 1766); N. n. molaris Merriam, 1902; N. n. nelsoni Merriam, 1901; N. n. yucatanica J. A. Allen, 1904	Southwestern United States (southern New Mexico, Arizona, but no longer Texas), Mexico, Central America, and northwest Colombia.	Size: Habitat: Diet:	LC
South American coati	Nasua nasua (Linnaeus, 1766) Thirteen subspecies: N. n. nasua Linnaeus, 1766; N. n. spadicea Olfers, 1818; N. n. solitaria Schinz, 1823; N. n. vittata Tschudi, 1844; N. n. montana Tschudi, 1844; N. n. dorsalis Gray, 1866; N. n. molaris Merriam, 1902; N. n. manium Thomas, 1912; N. n. candace Thomas, 1912; N. n. quichua Thomas, 1912; N. n. cinerascens Lönnberg, 1921; N. n. aricana Vieira, 1945; N. n. boliviensis Cabrera, 1956	South America	Size: Habitat: Diet:	LC

DNA sequence analysis indicates that the N. narica and N. nasua lineages split about 5.6 million years ago.

The Cozumel Island coati had been recognized as a third species, but the vast majority of recent authorities treat it as a subspecies, N. narica nelsoni, of the white-nosed coati.

- Coatis
  - - - Nasua narica
    - - Nasuella meridensis
      - Nasuella olivacea
  - Nasua nasua
