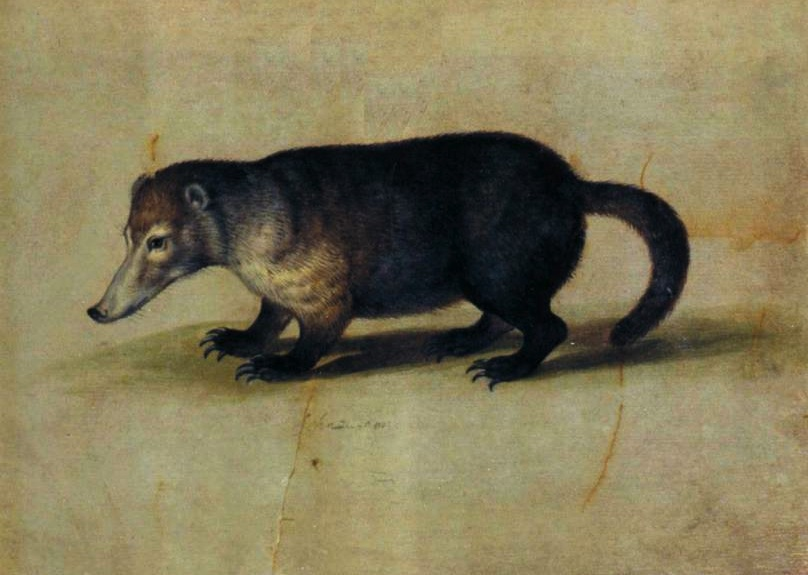
- Western mountain coati, Nasuella olivacea

Scientific classification
- Kingdom: Animalia
- Phylum: Chordata
- Class: Mammalia
- Order: Carnivora
- Family: Procyonidae
- Subtribe: Nasuina
- Genus: Nasuella; Hollister, 1915

Type species
- Nasua olivacea meridensis Thomas, 1901

Species
- Nasuella meridensis; Nasuella olivacea
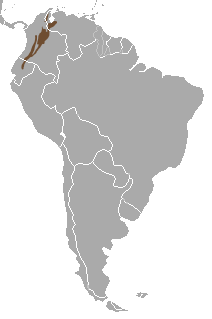
- Approximate combined range of the two mountain coatis

= Nasuella =

Genus of carnivores

Mountain coatis are two species of procyonid mammals from the genus Nasuella. Unlike the larger coatis from the genus Nasua, mountain coatis only weigh 1.0–1.5 kilograms (2.2–3.3 lb) and are endemic to the north Andean highlands in South America.

== Genetics and taxonomy ==
Genetic evidence indicates that the genus Nasua is only monophyletic if it also includes the mountain coatis. Based on cytochrome b sequences, Nasua nasua is the sister taxon to a clade consisting of Nasua narica plus both species of Nasuella.

Until recently only a single species with three subspecies was recognized. In 2009 this species was split into two species, the eastern mountain coati (N. meridensis) from Venezuela, and the western mountain coati (N. olivacea, with subspecies quitensis) from Colombia and Ecuador. After a genetic analysis in 2020, the American Society of Mammalogists currently considers N. meridensis a synonym of N. olivacea.

- Coatis
  - - - Nasua narica
    - - Nasuella meridensis
      - Nasuella olivacea
  - Nasua nasua

== Range and description ==
Externally, the two species of mountain coatis are quite similar, but the eastern mountain coati is overall smaller, somewhat shorter-tailed on average, has markedly smaller teeth, a paler olive-brown pelage, and usually a dark mid-dorsal stripe on the back (versus more rufescent or blackish, and usually without a dark mid-dorsal stripe in the western mountain coati). Both are found in cloud forest and páramo; at altitudes of 2,000–4,000 metres (6,600–13,100 ft) for the eastern mountain coati, and 1,300–4,250 metres (4,270–13,940 ft) for the western mountain coati.

A population discovered in southern Peru (more than 1,000 km or 620 mi south of the previous distribution limit) has tentatively been identified as the western mountain coati, but may represent an undescribed taxon.

== Rare and little known ==
They are very poorly known, and the "combined species" (when only one species was recognized) has been classified as data deficient by the IUCN. Their behavior largely appears to resemble that of the better-known Nasua coatis, although the mountain coatis feed less on fruit.

Unlike the Nasua coatis, mountain coatis are very rare in captivity. Among ISIS registered institutions, only three zoos (all in the US) reported that they had mountain coatis in early 2011, but at least one of these appears to be a case of misidentification. A mountain coati that was confiscated from poachers is kept at Bioparque la Reserva in Cota, Colombia.
