= Arctonasua =

Arctonasua Temporal range: Miocene–Pliocene

Scientific classification
- Kingdom: Animalia
- Phylum: Chordata
- Class: Mammalia
- Order: Carnivora
- Family: Procyonidae
- Genus: †Arctonasua; Baskin, 1982

Type species
- †Arctonasua floridana

Species
- See text

Extinct genus of carnivores

Arctonasua (meaning "bear coati") is an extinct genus of raccoon-like procyonid of the Miocene, endemic to North America. It lived from ~16.0—4.9 Mya, existing for approximately 11 million years.

== Species ==
- A. eurybates Baskin, 1982 - Sioux County, Nebraska, estimated age: ~10.5 Ma.
- A. floridana Baskin, 1982 - Alachua County, Florida, estimated age: ~11.5 Ma.
- A. fricki Baskin, 1982 - Texas County, Oklahoma, estimated age: ~8.4 Ma.
- A. gracilis Baskin, 1982 - Brown County, Nebraska and San Jacinto County, Texas, estimated age: ~8.4 Ma.
- A minima Baskin, 1982 - Dawes County, Nebraska, estimated age: ~17.1 Ma.
