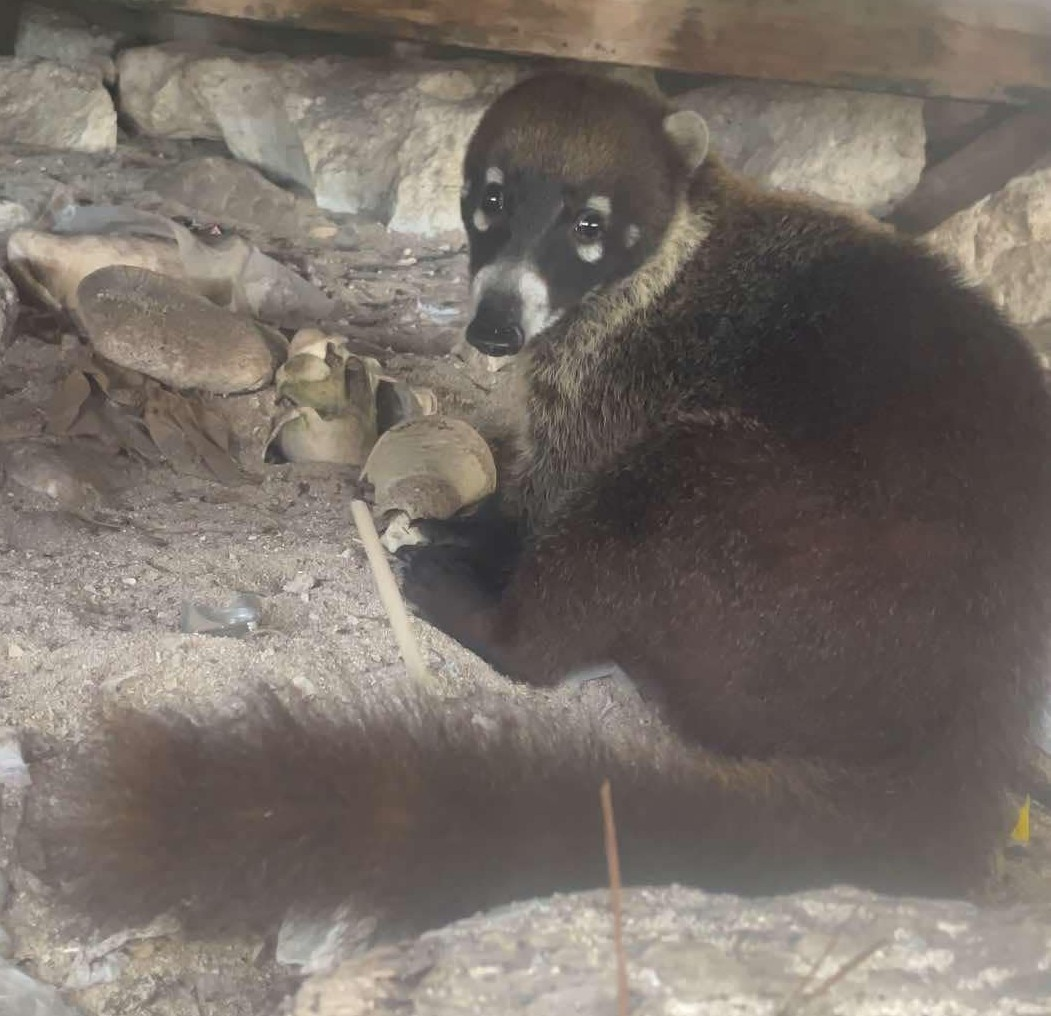

Scientific classification
- Kingdom: Animalia
- Phylum: Chordata
- Class: Mammalia
- Order: Carnivora
- Family: Procyonidae
- Genus: Nasua
- Species: N. narica
- Subspecies: N. n. nelsoni

Trinomial name
- Nasua narica nelsoni Merriam, 1901
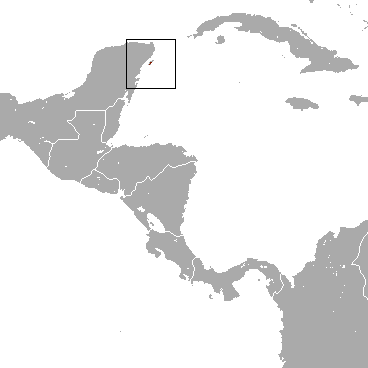
- Cozumel Island coati range

Synonyms
- Nasua nelsoni; Nasua thersites

= Cozumel coati =

Cozumel Island coati

Subspecies of carnivore

The Cozumel coati (Nasua narica nelsoni), dwarf coati, or Cozumel Island coati, is a coati from the Mexican island of Cozumel, in the Caribbean Sea. It is in the family Procyonidae, which also includes raccoons, ringtails, olingos, and kinkajous.

== Taxonomy ==
The Cozumel coati is a member of the genus Nasua. It was first described in 1901 and given the scientific name Nasua nelsoni by Clinton Hart Merriam, honoring naturalist Edward William Nelson. Independently, British zoologist Oldfield Thomas described the same population as Nasua thersites in 1901, a name now regarded as a synonym. Historically, Nasua nelsoni was considered a distinct species because of its markedly smaller body and skull compared to the white-nosed coati (N. narica). Early authorities recognized it as separate, with measurements showing Cozumel coatis at only 62–72% of the total length of mainland N. n. yucatanica).

The taxonomic status of the Cozumel coati remains debated. It has been recognized by some authorities as a distinct species due to its smaller body and cranial size compared to the mainland white-nosed coati and mitochondrial DNA evidence supporting significant divergence from mainland populations. Others, however, argue it should be classified as a subspecies, citing limited sample sizes and potential intraspecific variation.

It has been speculated that it is the result of an ancient introduction to Cozumel by the Mayans. Although not rated by the IUCN (where included in the widespread white-nosed coati), it is believed that the Cozumel Island coati is highly threatened and close to extinction.

== Description ==
As a result of insular dwarfism, the Cozumel coati is notably smaller than its mainland relatives. Adults have a total length of approximately 74–79 cm (29–31 in), including the tail, whereas white-nosed coatis from the mainland average around 100–120 cm (39–47 in) in length. A previous analysis recorded male Cozumel coatis at 785 mm (30.9 in) and females at 744 mm (29.3 in) total length, about 30–40% shorter than mainland coatis of the same genus.

== Distribution and habitat ==
The Cozumel coati is endemic to Cozumel Island, Mexico. Fossil and sub-fossil evidence indicates that coatis have existed on Cozumel for at least 1,500–2,000 years. Archaeological excavations at Maya sites on the island uncovered hundreds of N. nelsoni bones dating from 100 to 1500 AD, suggesting coatis were widespread and common in pre-Columbian times. It remains unresolved whether Cozumel's coatis arrived via natural colonization (e.g. rafting or an ancient land connection) or were deliberately introduced by Maya peoples. Some authors have speculated on human introduction, but current evidence points to a natural origin well before Mayan civilization. Historically, they ranged across the entire island in various habitats. An analysis of Mayan-era faunal remains showed the species was once "extremely widespread and relatively abundant" in Cozumel's environments. Today, their distribution is greatly diminished and fragmented.

Within Cozumel, the coati primarily inhabits tropical forests and dense woodland areas. Sightings have been mainly in the island's interior semi-evergreen tropical forests, which provide cover and foraging opportunities. They are adept climbers and can use the forest canopy for resting or to escape threats, but spend a great deal of time on the ground searching for food. Cozumel coatis have also been observed in coastal and mangrove habitats on the island due to the influx of anthropogenic waste.

== Behavior ==
Like other coatis, Cozumel coatis exhibit sexual dimorphism in social behavior. Adult females and their offspring live in social groups called bands, which typically consist of 4 to 8 individuals, but historically may have been larger. These female-led bands forage and travel together, cooperating in raising the young. Adult males are usually solitary except during the breeding season, when they temporarily join a band of females. This pattern has been observed on Cozumel as well, with researchers documenting sightings of both bands of dwarf coatis and lone males in the wild. Due to the species' rarity, group sizes on Cozumel today may be smaller than on the mainland, and encounters between groups are uncommon. Older residents of the island recall that coatis once could be seen in larger bands decades ago, whereas now it is rare to see more than a few together.

While specific home range sizes have not been published for Cozumel coatis, they are thought to cover substantial areas relative to the island's size. They often travel with tails held high, which helps band members keep sight of each other in vegetation. These coatis can climb trees swiftly when needed to find fruit or avoid danger, and will spend the night sleeping off the ground. There are no native large predators on Cozumel, but feral dogs and possibly invasive boa constrictors have been known to attack coatis.

== Diet ==
The Cozumel coati is an omnivore, with a diet very similar to that of the white-nosed coati. It feeds on a variety of fruits, invertebrates, and small vertebrate prey available on the island. One study found in about 88% of observed feeding instances, the coatis were consuming wild fruits, indicating a heavy reliance on seasonal fruiting trees and shrubs. Like other coatis, they are capable of scavenging carrion and will eat almost any edible matter they find. The dwarf coati's diet likely also varies seasonally. During Cozumel's dry season, fruit becomes scarcer and coatis may depend more on insects or other protein sources. There are anecdotal reports of Cozumel coatis raiding sea turtle nests (similar to raccoons on the island) for eggs, but raccoons are the primary predator of turtle eggs in that ecosystem.

== Conservation status ==
Historically, the Cozumel coati was recognized as a distinct taxon and was listed as Endangered by the IUCN. The conservation status of the Cozumel coati is complicated by its taxonomic ranking. Currently, many authorities consider Nasua nelsoni a subspecies of the widespread white-nosed coati, which is classified as Least Concern on the IUCN Red List. As a result, the Cozumel population is not separately assessed in the Red List. Rather, it is lumped under the mainland species' evaluation. Conservationists have argued that this approach is inappropriate for an island endemic on the brink of extinction.

The population of Cozumel coatis has drastically declined over the past half-century. Precise numbers are hard to determine due to the animal's rarity and secretive nature. The first systematic survey in the 1990s used line-transect sampling and estimated roughly 150 ± 95 individuals on the entire island. By 2009, biologists described the Cozumel coati as "exceedingly rare" and feared the total population could be below 100 animals.

In Mexico's official conservation listings, the Cozumel coati is classified as "Amenazada" (Threatened), and has been under legal protection since 1994. This listing affords it some protection against hunting or capture.

== See also ==
- Cozumel Raccoon

== Gallery ==
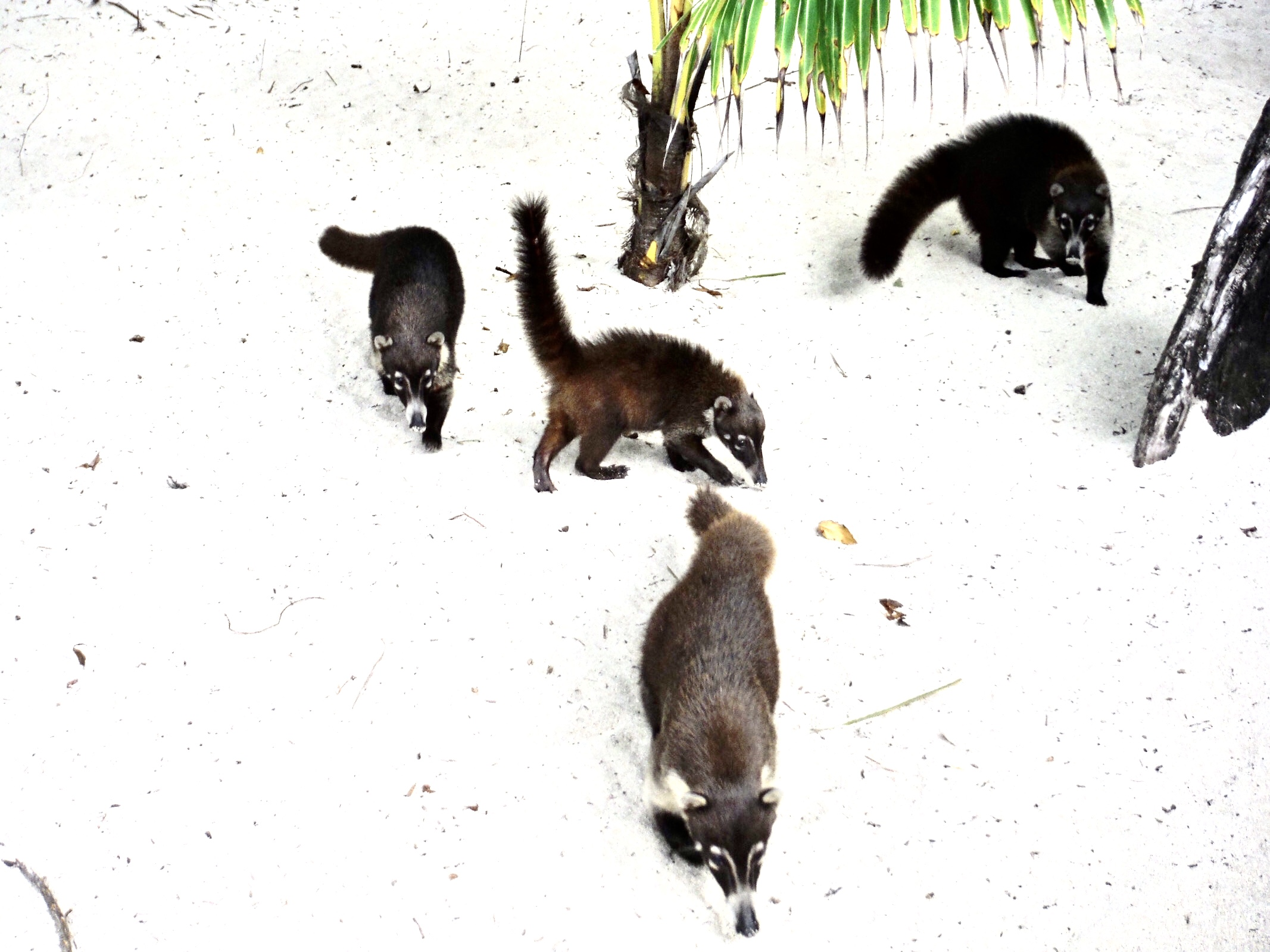
Cozumel coati family at Fury Beach. Mexico

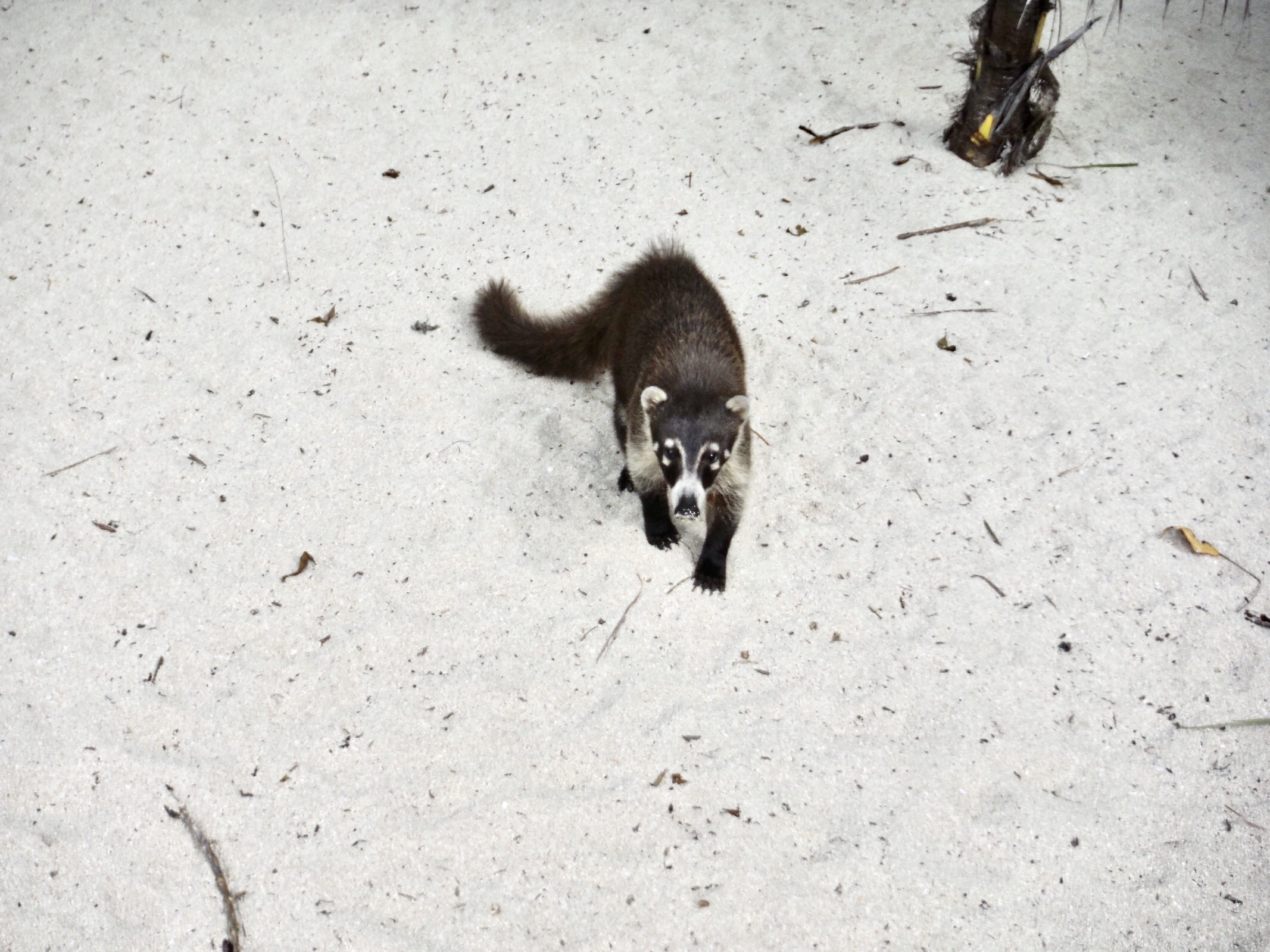
Specimen on beach

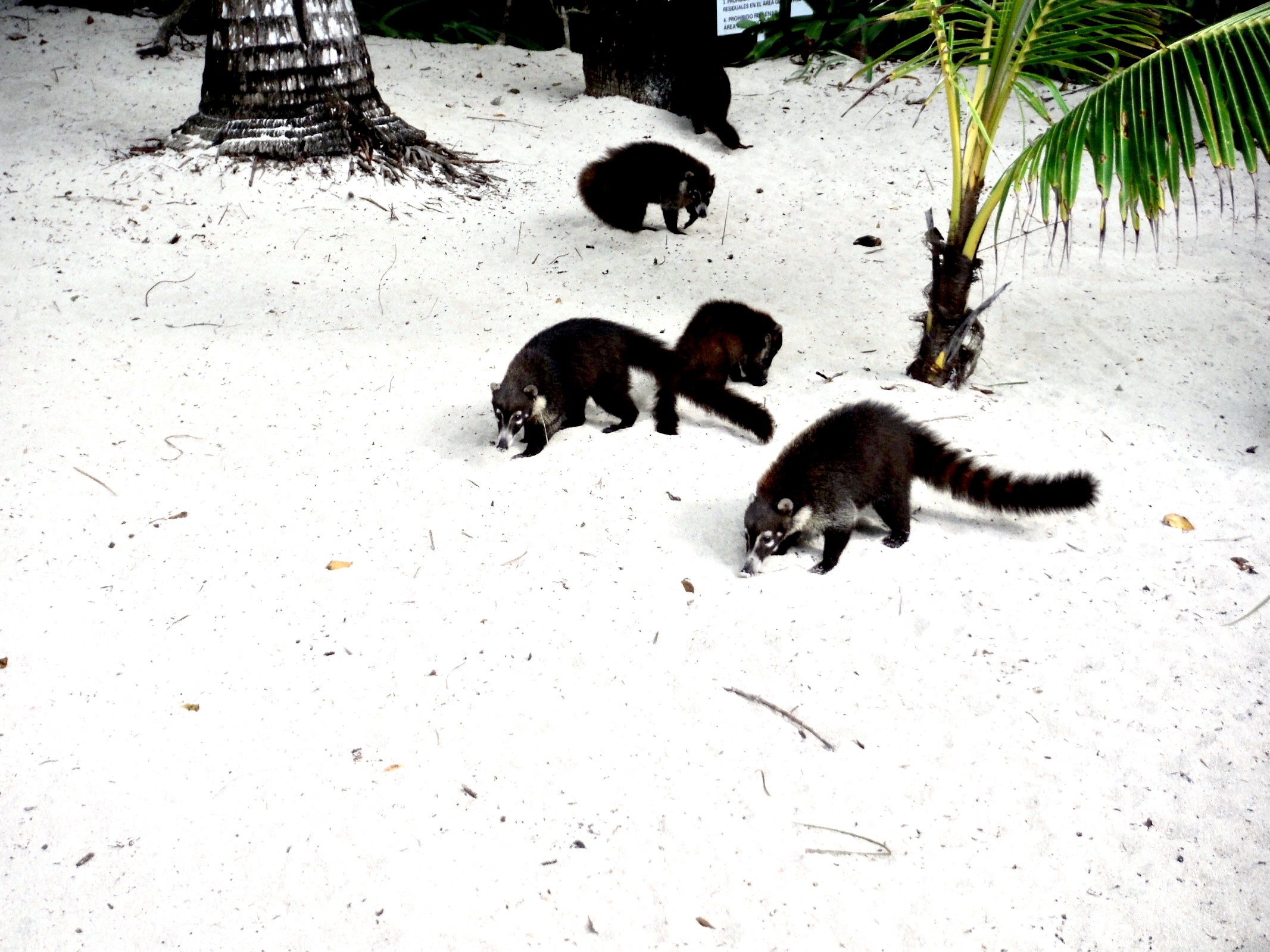
