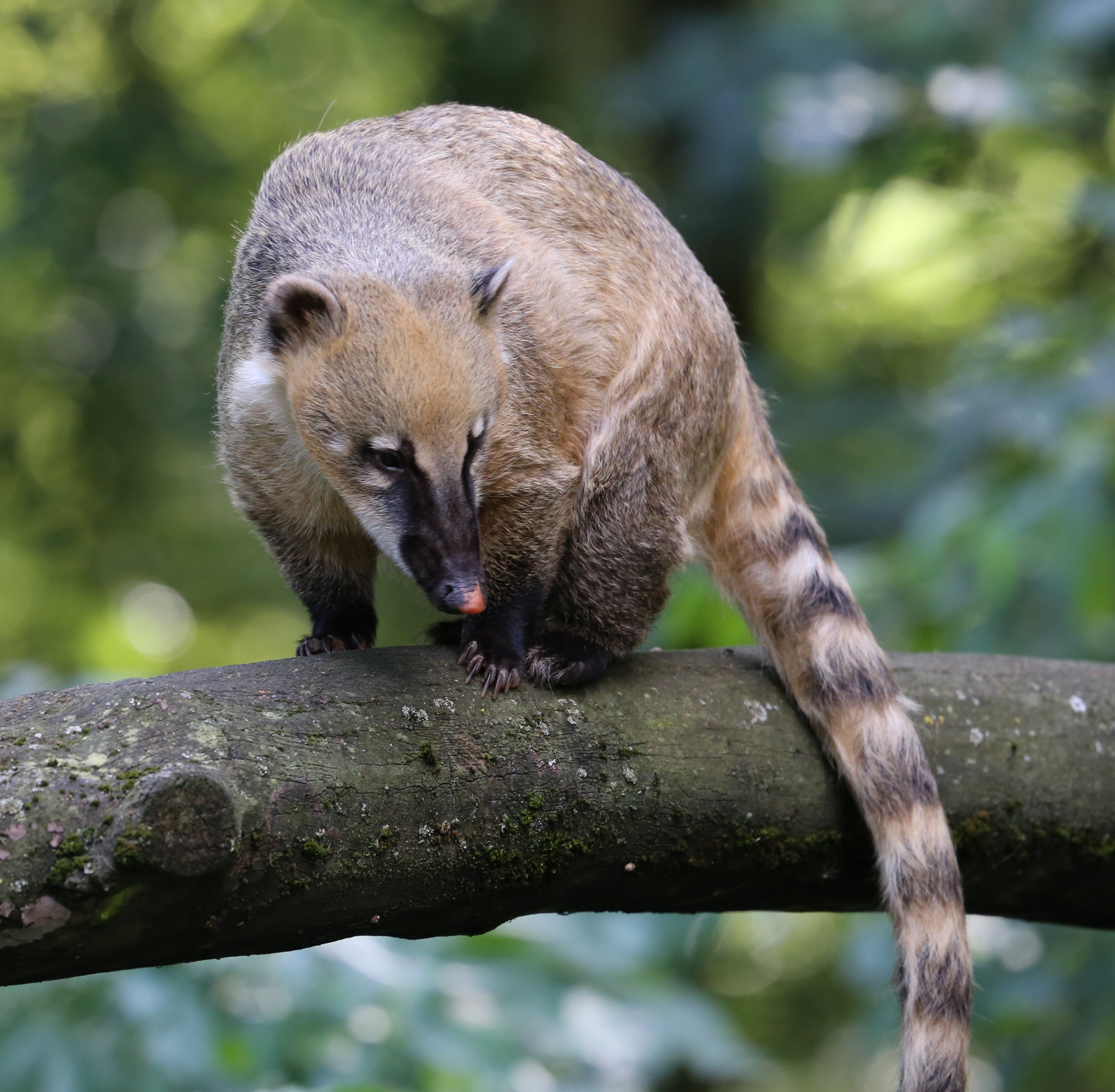
- At Augsburg Zoo, Germany

Conservation status
- Least Concern (IUCN 3.1)

Scientific classification
- Kingdom: Animalia
- Phylum: Chordata
- Class: Mammalia
- Infraclass: Placentalia
- Order: Carnivora
- Family: Procyonidae
- Genus: Nasua
- Species: N. nasua

Binomial name
- Nasua nasua (Linnaeus, 1766)

Subspecies
- 13, see text
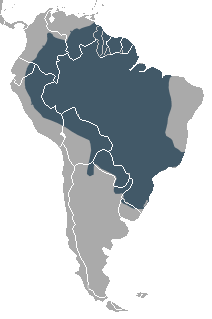
- South American coati range. Note: Also found in west Ecuador, and west and north Colombia, see text.

Synonyms
- Viverra nasua Linnaeus, 1766

= South American coati =

South American coati Temporal range: 0.12600–0 Ma Pleistocene to Holocene

Species of carnivore

The South American coati (Nasua nasua), also known as the ring-tailed coati or brown-nosed coati, is a coati species and a member of the raccoon family (Procyonidae), found in the tropical and subtropical parts of South America. An adult generally weighs from 2–7.2 kg (4.4–15.9 lb) and is 85–113 cm (33–44 in) long, with half of that being its tail. Its color is highly variable and the rings on the tail may be only somewhat visible, but its most distinguishing characteristic is that it lacks the largely white snout (or "nose") of its northern relative, the white-nosed coati.

== Distribution and habitat ==
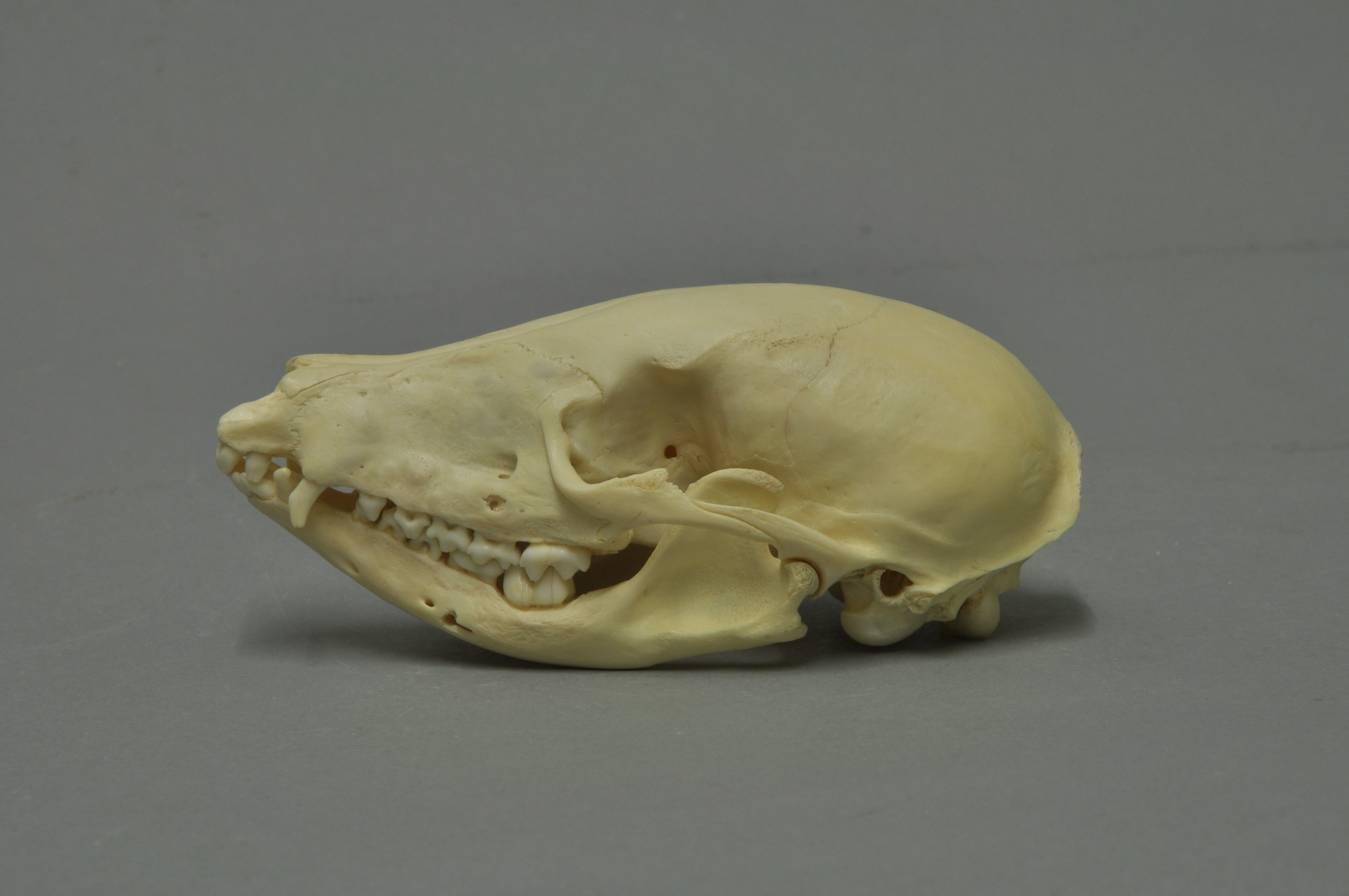
Skull of a South American coati

The South American coati is widespread in tropical and subtropical South America. It occurs in the lowland forests east of the Andes as high as 2,500 m (8,200 ft) from Colombia and The Guianas south to Uruguay and northern Argentina. Nasua nasua occupancy is significantly and negatively related to elevation but positively related to forest cover.

It has been recorded in west Ecuador, and north and west Colombia. In Argentina, it has been recorded in Santa Fe and Salta Provinces. It has been introduced and naturalized on the island of Mallorca, where it is considered an invasive species.

The only documented records of white-nosed coati in South America are from far northwestern Colombia, in the Gulf of Urabá region, near the Colombian border with Panama. The smaller mountain coati lives foremost at altitudes above the South American coati, but there is considerable overlap.

== Invasiveness ==
In the European Union, the South American coati has been included in the list of Invasive Alien Species of Union concern since 2016. This means that this species cannot be imported, bred, transported, commercialized, or intentionally released into the environment in the entire EU.

Its listing has been denied in the United Kingdom since late 2020, when the country left the membership act.

== Behavior and ecology ==
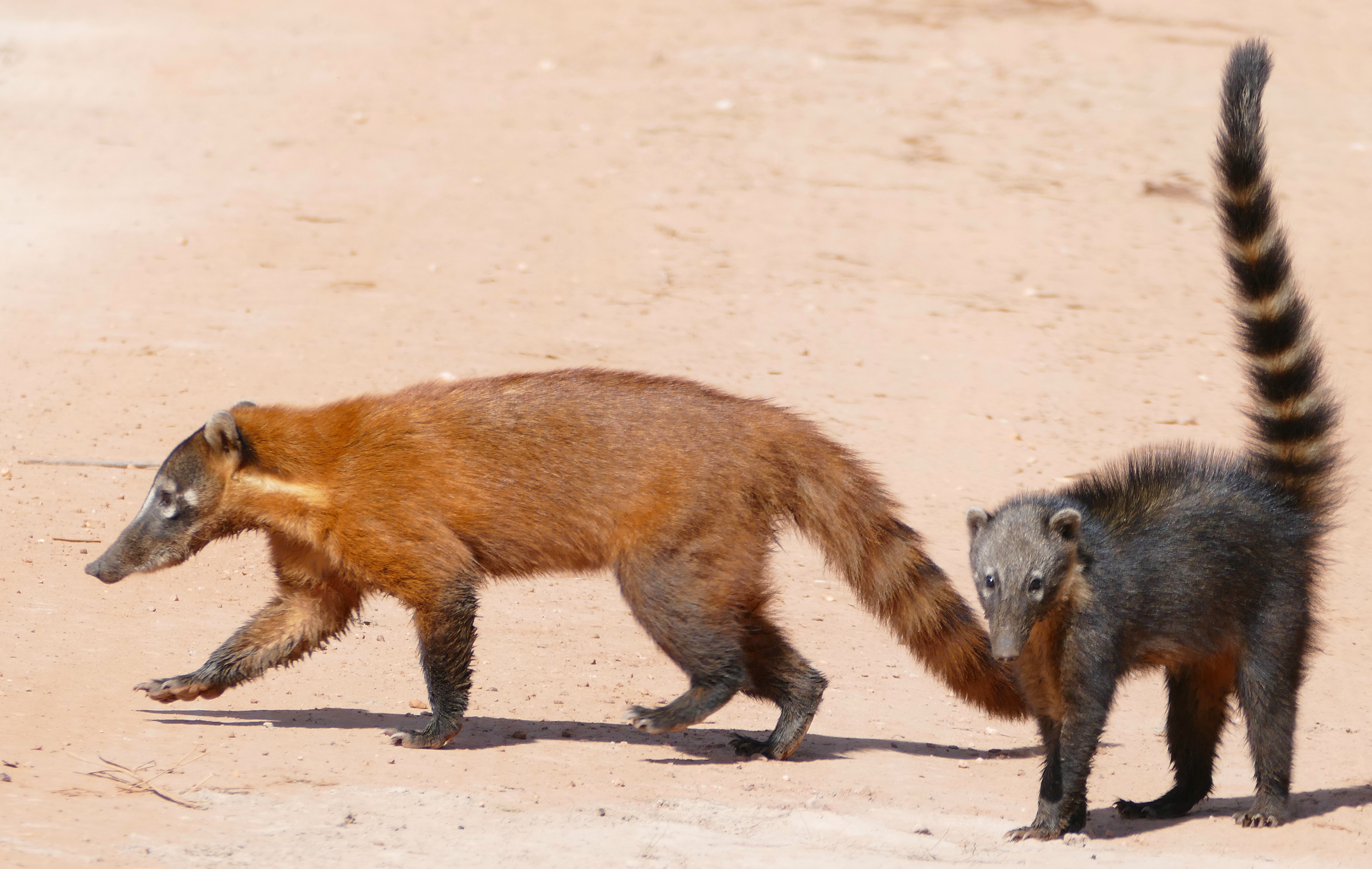
South American coatis are variable in color and can—among others—be almost black or orange-red.

The South American coati is diurnal and lives both on the ground and in trees. It is omnivorous but primarily eats fruit, invertebrates, other small animals, and bird eggs. It also searches for fruit in trees high in the canopy and uses its snouts to poke through crevices to find animal prey on the ground. Furthermore, it also searches for animal prey by turning over rocks on the ground or ripping open logs with its claws. The South American coati was found to be a host of an intestinal acanthocephalan parasitic worm, Pachysentis lauroi.

Females typically live in large groups, called bands, consisting of 15 to 30 animals. Males are usually solitary. Solitary males were originally considered a separate species due to their different social habits and were called coatimundis, a term still sometimes used today. Neither bands of females nor solitary males defend a unique territory, and territories therefore overlap.

Group members can produce soft whining sounds, but alarm calls are different, consisting of loud woofs and clicks. Coatis typically sleep in the trees. When an alarm call is sounded, they climb trees, and then drop down to the ground and disperse. Predators of the South American coati include foxes, jaguars, jaguarundis, and occasionally humans.

=== Reproduction ===
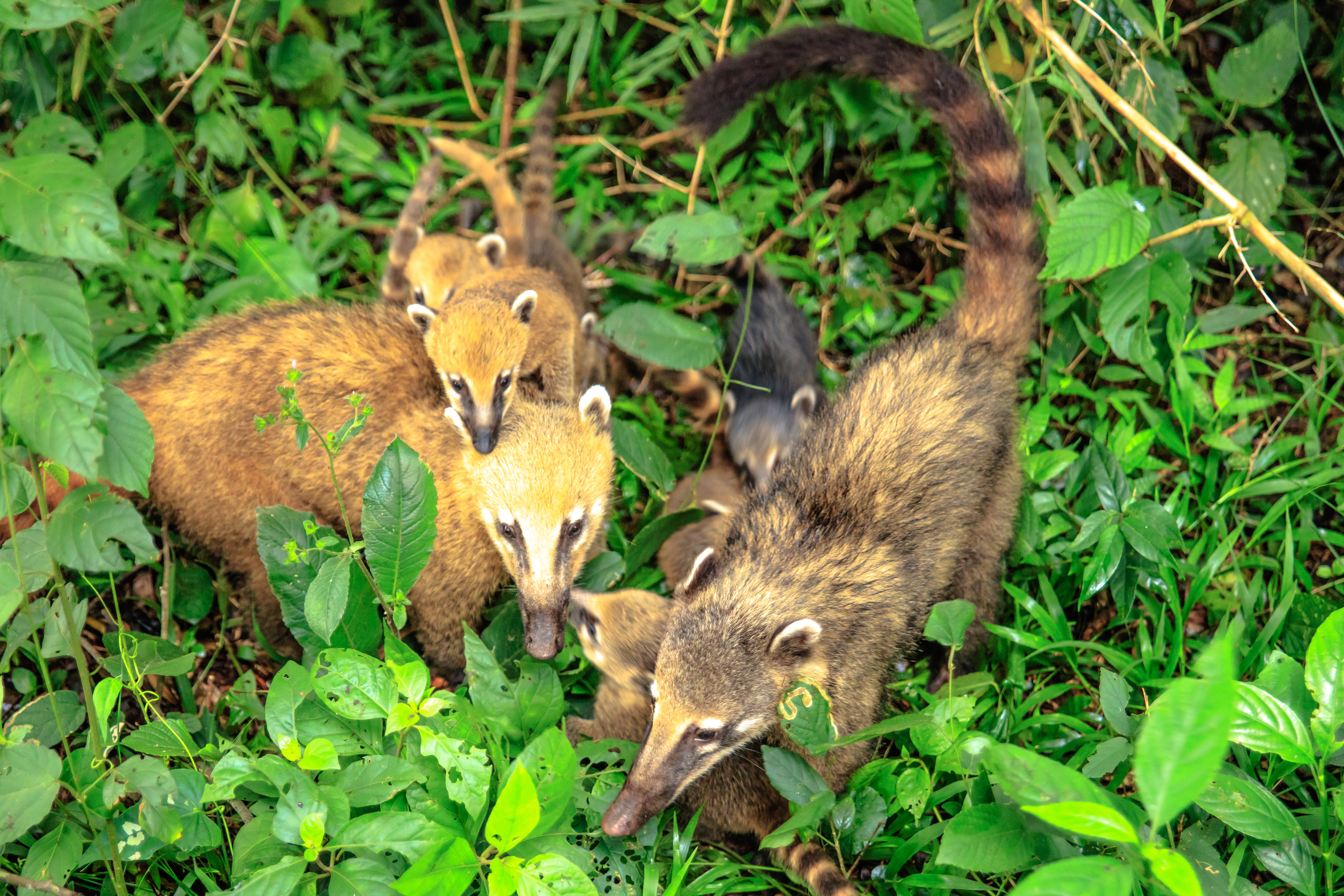
A coati family in Iguazu Falls

All females in a group come into heat simultaneously when fruit is in season and mate with several males. The gestation period is 74 to 77 days. The estrus period lasts 1–2 weeks. Captive females give birth to 1–7 young at a time. In the wild, they leave the group to give birth in a nest built in trees and rejoin the group with their offspring 5–6 weeks later. They usually remain with their natal group. Males generally disperse from their natal group at the age of three years. South American coatis generally live for up to 7 years in the wild but can live up to 14 years in captivity.

== Taxonomy ==
Viverra nasua was the scientific name proposed by Carl Linnaeus in 1766 for a red coati specimen. It was subordinated to the genus Nasua. As of 2005, 13 subspecies were recognized:

- N. n. nasua Linnaeus, 1766
- N. n. spadicea Olfers, 1818
- N. n. solitaria Schinz, 1823
- N. n. vittata Tschudi, 1844
- N. n. montana Tschudi, 1844
- N. n. dorsalis Gray, 1866
- N. n. molaris Merriam, 1902
- N. n. manium Thomas, 1912
- N. n. candace Thomas, 1912
- N. n. quichua Thomas, 1912
- N. n. cinerascens Lönnberg, 1921
- N. n. aricana Vieira, 1945
- N. n. boliviensis Cabrera, 1956
