= White-nosed coati =

- A white-nosed coati near San Miguel, Alajuela, Costa Rica
- In Tulum, Mexico

Conservation status
- Least Concern (IUCN 3.1)

- Secure (NatureServe)

Scientific classification
- Kingdom: Animalia
- Phylum: Chordata
- Class: Mammalia
- Order: Carnivora
- Family: Procyonidae
- Genus: Nasua
- Species: N. narica

Binomial name
- Nasua narica (Linnaeus, 1766)

Subspecies
- N. n. narica (Linnaeus, 1766); N. n. molaris Merriam, 1902; N. n. nelsoni Merriam, 1901; N. n. yucatanica J. A. Allen, 1904
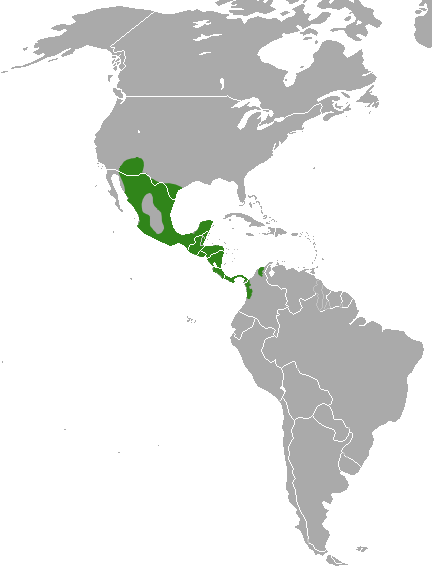
- The native range of the white-nosed coati. Note: Its Colombian range is restricted to the far northwest (see text).

Synonyms
- Viverra narica (Linnaeus, 1766)

Species of mammal

The white-nosed coati (Nasua narica), also known as the coatimundi (/koʊˌɑːtɪˈmʌndi/), is a species of coati and a member of the family Procyonidae (raccoons and their relatives). Local Spanish names for the species include antoon, gato solo, pizote, and tejón, depending upon the region. It weighs about 4–6 kg (8.8–13.2 lb), and the nose-to-tail length of the species is about 110 cm (3.6 ft) with about half of that being the tail length. However, small females can weigh as little as 3.1 kg (6.8 lb), while large males can weigh as much as 9 kg (20 lb).

== Distribution and habitat ==
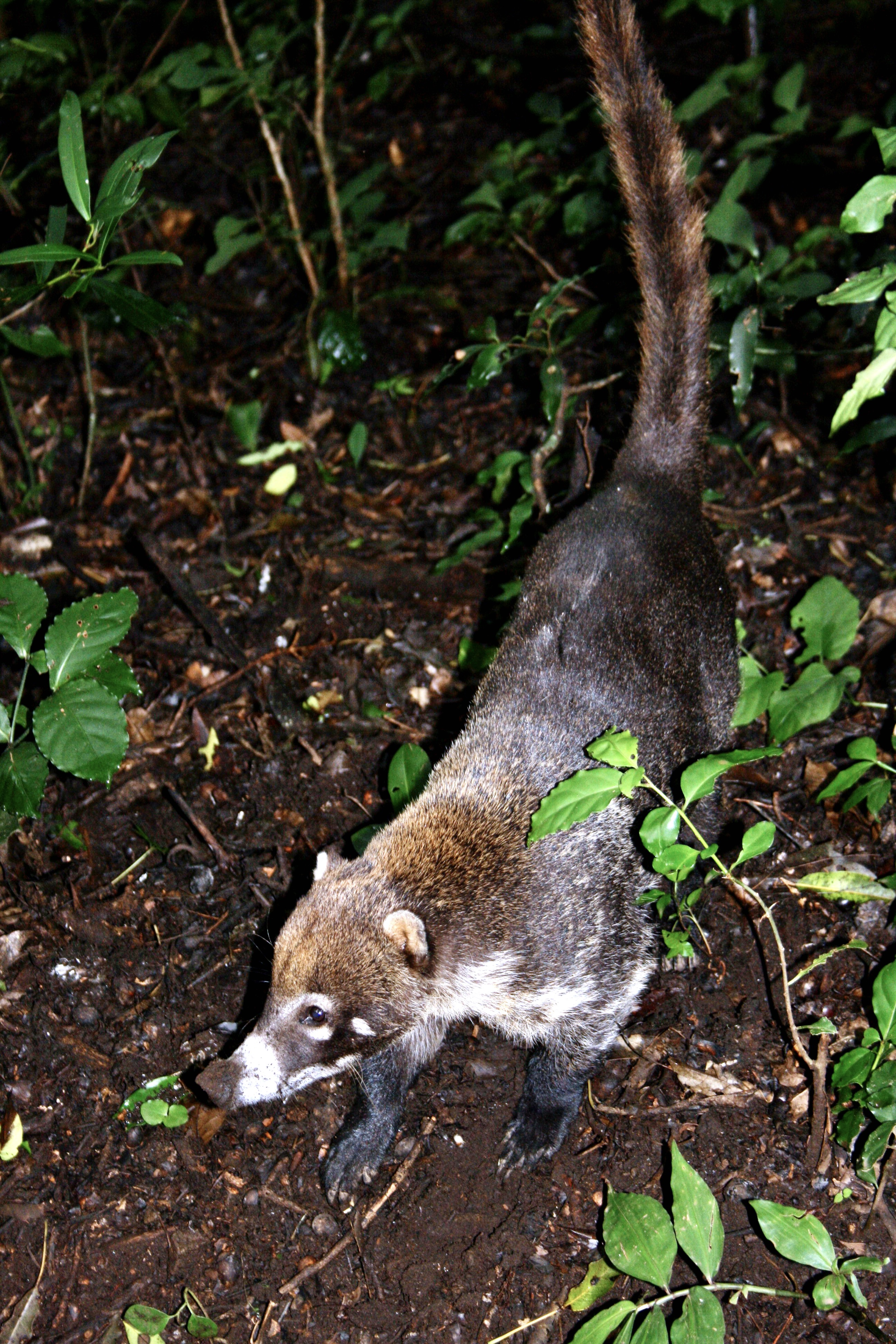
A white-nosed coati at Rincón de la Vieja Volcano National Park in Costa Rica

The white-nosed coati is distributed from as far north as Flagstaff, Arizona, New Mexico, through Mexico, Central America, and the far northwestern region of Colombia near the border with Panama. It inhabits wooded areas in tropical and subtropical dry broadleaf forests and in tropical and subtropical moist broadleaf forests at elevations from sea level to 3,000 m (9,800 ft).

Coatis from Cozumel Island have been treated as a separate species, the Cozumel Island coati, but the vast majority of recent authorities treat it as a subspecies, N. narica nelsoni, of the white-nosed coati. They are smaller than white-nosed coatis from the adjacent mainland (N. n. yucatanica), but when compared more widely to white-nosed coatis the difference in size is not as clear. The level of other differences also support its status as a subspecies rather than separate species.

White-nosed coatis have also been found in Florida, where they were introduced. It is unknown precisely when introduction occurred; an early specimen in the Florida Museum of Natural History, labeled an "escaped captive", dates to 1928. There are several later documented cases of coatis escaping captivity, and since the 1970s there have been a number of sightings, and several live and dead specimens of various ages have been found. These reports have occurred over a wide area of southern Florida, and there is probable evidence of breeding, indicating that the population is well established.

Although rare, there is evidence of the White-nosed coatis in Texas in Cameron County, as far back as 1877. Other sightings occurred in Maverick (1938), Brewster (1939), and Uvalde (1943) counties. There were sightings in Aransas and Kerr Counties, and three sightings were reported in the Big Bend area from 1959 to 1966. A possible escaped pet was discovered as road-kill near Abilene in 1975. The latest two sightings were on 27 July 1994, near the Guadalupe River and on 29 April 1995, a coati was seen crossing State Road 175, 2 miles (3.2 km) north of the intersection of Texas State Highway 77 and State Road 175.

== Behavior and ecology ==
Unlike many of their Procyonidae cousins, such as raccoons and kinkajous, coatis are diurnal and therefore do much of their foraging during the day.

=== Pollination ===
White-nosed coatis are known pollinators of the balsa tree, as observed in a study of a white-nosed coati population in Costa Rica. The coati were observed inserting their noses into the flowers of the tree and ingesting nectar, while the flower showed no subsequent signs of damage. Pollen from the flowers covers the face of the coati following feeding and disseminates through the surrounding forest following detachment. Scientists observed a dependent relationship between the balsa tree, which provides a critical resource of hydration and nutrition to the white-nosed coati when environmental resources are scarce, and the coati, which increases proliferation of the tree through pollination.

=== Feeding habits ===
The white-nosed coati is an omnivore and forages mostly on the ground for small vertebrates, fruits, carrion, insects, snakes, and eggs. It can climb trees easily and uses its tail for balancing.

=== Reproduction and life span ===
A young coati, approximately six weeks old

Adult male coatis live solitary lives except during the mating season. Female coatis live in groups, called bands, with their offspring, including males less than two years old. Gestation lasts 10 to 11 weeks, and litters consist of two to seven young. The young are weaned at four months and reach adult size at 15 months.

Coatis can live as long as seven years in the wild. In captivity, the average lifespan is about 14 years, but some coatis in human care have been known to live into their late teens.

== Conservation ==
The International Union for Conservation of Nature lists the white-nosed coati as least concern. However, the coati is an endangered species in New Mexico. The primary threats to white-nosed coatis are habitat loss and hunting. The white-nosed coati is hunted for its meat and pelt, and is sometimes captured in traps intended for other species or accidentally killed by hunters seeking other animals. The White-nosed coati is also occasionally kept as a pet. Distemper and rabies affect the white-nosed coati populations, and its predators include various cat species, boas and large birds.

This species suffered significant population declines in the 1960s but has since recovered. White-nosed coatis have extended their range into the United States since the beginning of the twentieth century.

== See also ==
- Ring-tailed coati
