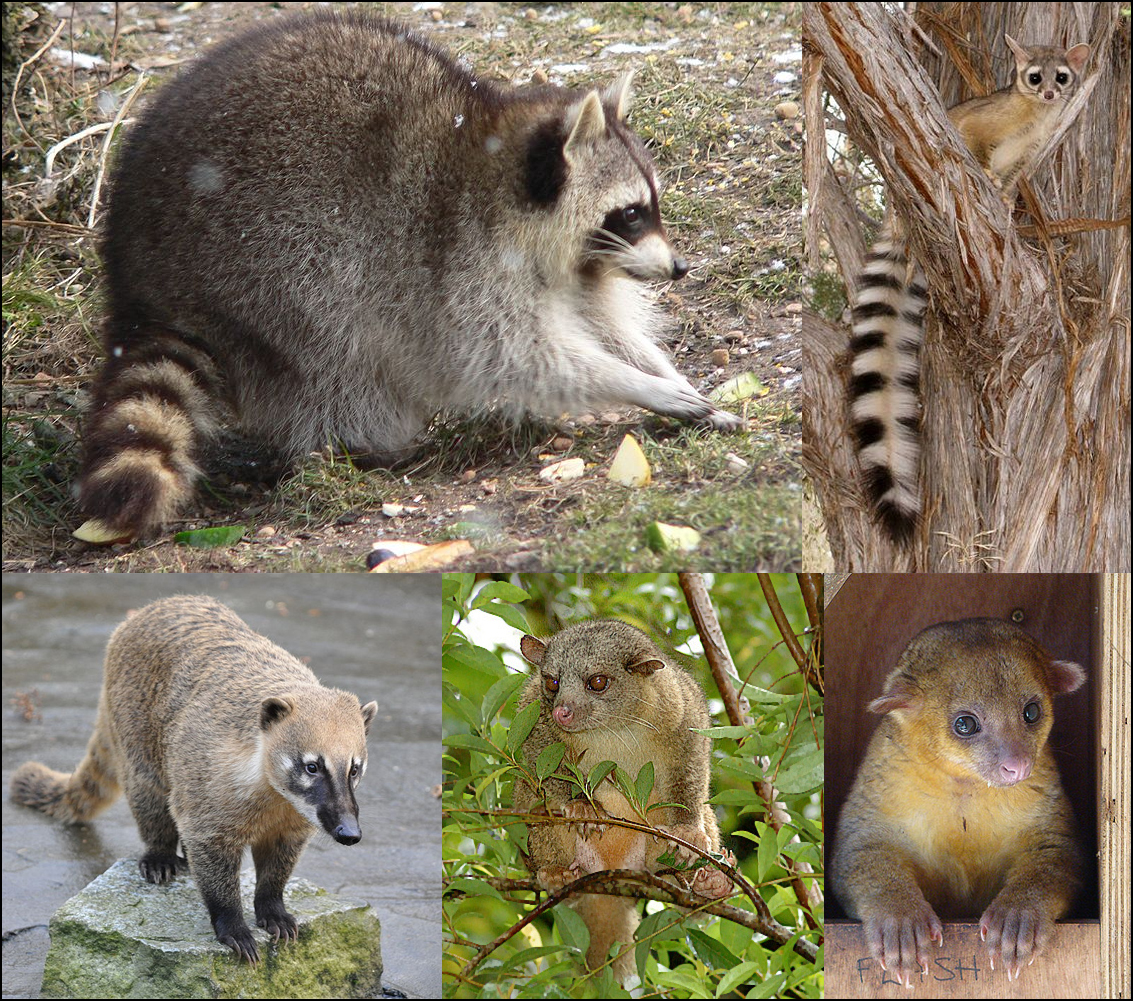
- From top left to bottom right: raccoon (Procyon), ringtail (Bassariscus), South American coati (Nasua), northern olingo (Bassaricyon), kinkajou (Potos)

Scientific classification
- Kingdom: Animalia
- Phylum: Chordata
- Class: Mammalia
- Infraclass: Placentalia
- Order: Carnivora
- Superfamily: Musteloidea
- Family: Procyonidae; Gray, 1825

Type genus
- Procyon Storr, 1780

Genera
- Extant genera: Bassariscus; Procyon; Nasua; Nasuella; Bassaricyon; Potos; Extinct genera: †Arctonasua; †Bassaricyonoides; †Broiliana; †Chapalmalania; †Cyonasua; †Edaphocyon; †Parahyaenodon; †Parapotos; †Paranasua; †Probassariscus; †Protoprocyon; †Stromeriella; †Tetraprothomo
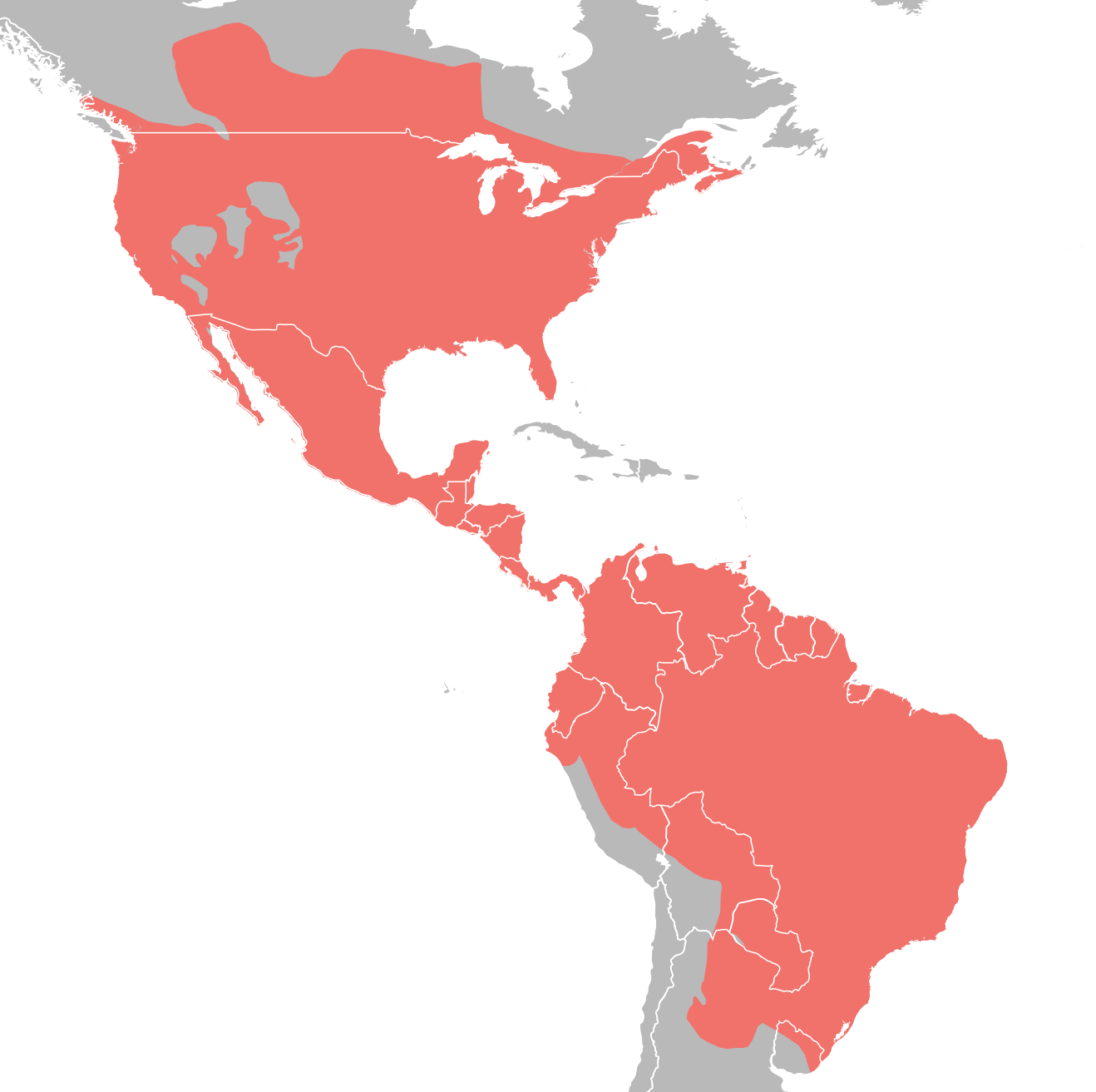
- Procyonidae distribution

= Procyonidae =

Procyonidae Temporal range: 22.6–0 Ma Early Miocene to Holocene

Family of mammals

Procyonidae (/ˌproʊsiːˈɒnɪdiː/ PROH-see-ON-i-dee) is a New World family of the order Carnivora. It includes the raccoons, ringtails, cacomistles, coatis, kinkajous, olingos, and olinguitos. Procyonids inhabit a wide range of environments and are generally omnivorous.

== Characteristics ==
Procyonids are relatively small animals, with generally slender bodies and long tails, though the common raccoon tends to be bulky.

Because of their general build, the Procyonidae are often popularly viewed as smaller cousins of the bear family. This is apparent in their German name, Kleinbären (small bears), including the names of the species: a raccoon is called a Waschbär (washing bear, as it "washes" its food before eating), a coati is a Nasenbär (nose-bear), while a kinkajou is a Honigbär (honey-bear). Dutch follows suit, calling the animals wasbeer, neusbeer and rolstaartbeer (curl-tail bear) respectively. However, it is now believed that procyonids are more closely related to mustelids than to bears. Procyonids share common morphological characteristics including a shortened rostrum, absent alisphenoid canals, and a relatively flat mandibular fossa. Kinkajous have unique morphological characteristics consistent with their arboreally adapted locomotion, including a prehensile tail and unique femoral structure.

Due to their omnivorous diet, procyonids have lost some of the adaptations for flesh-eating found in their carnivorous relatives. While they do have carnassial teeth, these are poorly developed in most species, especially the raccoons. Apart from the kinkajou, procyonids have the dental formula: 3.1.4.23.1.4.2 for a total of 40 teeth. The kinkajou has one fewer premolar in each row: 3.1.3.23.1.3.2 for a total of 36 teeth.

Most members of Procyonidae are solitary; however, some species form groups. Coati females will form bands of 4 to 24 individuals that forage together, while kinkajous have been found to form social groups of two males and one female. Certain procyonids give birth to one offspring like ringtails, olingos, and kinkajous while raccoons and coatis give birth to litters that range in size from 2 to 6 offspring.

=== Evolution ===
Procyonid fossils once thought to belong to the genus Bassariscus, which includes the modern ringtail and cacomistle, have been identified from the Miocene epoch, around 20 million years (Ma) ago. It has been suggested that early procyonids were an offshoot of the canids that adapted to a more omnivorous diet. The recent evolution of procyonids has been centered on Central America (where their diversity is greatest); they entered the formerly isolated South America as part of the Great American Interchange, beginning about 7.3 Ma ago in the late Miocene, with the appearance of Cyonasua. Some fossil procyonids such as Stromeriella were also present in the Old World, before going extinct in the Pliocene.

Genetic studies have shown that kinkajous are a sister group to all other extant procyonids; they split off about 22.6 Ma ago. The clades leading to coatis and olingos on one branch, and to ringtails and raccoons on the other, separated about 17.7 Ma ago. The divergence between olingos and coatis is estimated to have occurred about 10.2 Ma ago, at about the same time that ringtails and raccoons parted ways. The separation between coatis and mountain coatis is estimated to have occurred 7.7 Ma ago.

== Classification ==
There has been considerable historical uncertainty over the correct classification of several members. The red panda was previously classified in this family, but it is now classified in its own family, the Ailuridae, based on molecular biology studies. The status of the various olingos was disputed: some regarded them all as subspecies of Bassaricyon gabbii before DNA sequence data demonstrated otherwise.

The traditional classification scheme shown below on the left predates the recent revolution in our understanding of procyonid phylogeny based on genetic sequence analysis. This outdated classification groups kinkajous and olingos together on the basis of similarities in morphology that are now known to be an example of parallel evolution; similarly, coatis are shown as being most closely related to raccoons, when in fact they are closest to olingos. Below right is a cladogram showing the results of molecular studies as of 2013. Genus Nasuella was not included in these studies, but in a separate study was found to nest within Nasua.

- Procyonidae
  - - - Bassaricyon (olingos and olinguito)
      - Nasua and Nasuella (coatis)
    - - Procyon (raccoons)
      - Bassariscus (ringtail and cacomistle)
  - Potos (kinkajou)

- FAMILY PROCYONIDAE
  - Subfamily Procyoninae (nine species in four genera)
    - Tribe Procyonini
      - Subtribe Procyonina
        - Raccoons, Procyon
          - Crab-eating raccoon, Procyon cancrivorus
          - Cozumel raccoon, Procyon pygmaeus
          - Common raccoon, Procyon lotor
      - Subtribe Nasuina
        - Nasua
          - South American coati or ring-tailed coati, Nasua nasua
          - White-nosed coati, Nasua narica
        - Nasuella
          - Western mountain coati, Nasuella olivacea
          - Eastern mountain coati, Nasuella meridensis
    - Tribe Bassariscini
      - Bassariscus
        - Ringtail, Bassariscus astutus
        - Cacomistle, Bassariscus sumichrasti
  - Subfamily Potosinae (five species in two genera)
    - Potos
      - Kinkajou, Potos flavus
    - Bassaricyon
      - Northern olingo or Gabbi's olingo, Bassaricyon gabbii
      - Eastern lowland olingo, Bassaricyon alleni
      - Western lowland olingo, Bassaricyon medius
      - Olinguito, Bassaricyon neblina

=== Phylogeny ===
Several recent molecular studies have resolved the phylogenetic relationships between the procyonids, as illustrated in the cladogram below.

- Procyonidae
  - Potos
    Potos flavus (kinkajou)
  - - - Procyon (raccoons)
        - Procyon cancrivorus (crab eating raccoon)
        - Procyon lotor (common raccoon)
        - Procyon pygmaeus (Cozumel raccoon)
      - Bassariscus
        - Bassariscus sumichrasti (cacomistle)
        - Bassariscus astutus (ringtail)
    - - Bassaricyon (olingos)
        - - - Bassaricyon medius (western lowland olingo)
            - Bassaricyon alleni (eastern lowland olingo)
          - Bassaricyon gabbii (northern olingo)
        - Bassaricyon neblina (olinguito)
      - Nasuina (coatis)
        - - Nasua nasua (ring-tailed coati)
          - - Nasua narica (white-nosed coati)
            - Nasuella
              - Nasuella olivacea (western mountain coati)
              - Nasuella meridensis (eastern mountain coati)

=== Extinct taxa ===
Below is a list of extinct taxa (many of which are fossil genera and species) compiled in alphabetical order under their respective subfamilies.

- Procyonidae J.E. Gray, 1825
  - †Broilianinae Dehm, 1950
    - †Broiliana Dehm, 1950
      - †B. dehmi Beaumont & Mein, 1973
      - †B. nobilis Dehm, 1950
    - †Stromeriella Dehm, 1950
      - †S. depressa Morlo, 1996
      - †S. franconica Dehm, 1950
  - Potosinae Trouessart, 1904
    - †Parapotos J.A. Baskin, 2003
      - †P. tedfordi J.A. Baskin, 2003
  - Procyoninae J.E. Gray, 1825
    - †Arctonasua J.A. Baskin, 1982
      - †A. eurybates J.A. Baskin, 1982
      - †A. fricki J.A. Baskin, 1982
      - †A. floridana J.A. Baskin, 1982
      - †A. gracilis J.A. Baskin, 1982
      - †A. minima J.A. Baskin, 1982
    - †Bassaricyonoides J.A. Baskin & Morea, 2003
      - †B. stewartae J.A. Baskin & Morea, 2003
      - †B. phyllismillerae J.A. Baskin & Morea, 2003
    - Bassariscus Coues, 1887
      - †B. antiquus Matthew & Cook, 1909
      - †B. casei Hibbard, 1952
      - †B. minimus J.A. Baskin, 2004
      - †B. ogallalae Hibbard, 1933
      - †B. parvus Hall, 1927
    - †Chapalmalania Ameghino, 1908
      - †C. altaefrontis Kraglievich & Olazábal, 1959
      - †C. ortognatha Ameghino, 1908
    - †Cyonasua Ameghino, 1885 [=Amphinasua Moreno & Mercerat, 1891; Brachynasua Ameghino & Kraglievich 1925; Pachynasua Ameghino, 1904]
      - †C. argentina Ameghino 1885
      - †C. argentinus (Burmeister, 1891)
      - †C. brevirostris (Moreno & Mercerat, 1891) [=Amphinasua brevirostris Moreno & Mercerat, 1891]
      - †C. clausa (Ameghino, 1904) [=Pachynasua clausa Ameghino, 1904]
      - †C. groeberi Kraglievich & Reig, 1954 [=Amphinasua groeberi Cabrera, 1936]
      - †C. longirostris (Rovereto, 1914)
      - †C. lutaria (Cabrera, 1936) [=Amphinasua lutaria Cabrera, 1936]
      - †C. meranii (Ameghino & Kraglievich 1925) [=Brachynasua meranii Ameghino & Kraglievich 1925]
      - †C. pascuali Linares, 1981 [=Amphinasua pascuali Linares, 1981]
      - †C. robusta (Rovereto, 1914)
    - †Edaphocyon Wilson, 1960
      - †E. lautus J.A. Baskin, 1982
      - †E. palmeri J.A. Baskin & Morea, 2003
      - †E. pointblankensis Wilson, 1960
    - Nasua Storr, 1780
      - †N. pronarica Dalquest, 1978
      - †N. mastodonta Emmert & Short, 2018
      - †N. nicaeensis Holl, 1829
    - †Parahyaenodon Ameghino, 1904
      - †P. argentinus Ameghino, 1904
    - †Paranasua J.A. Baskin, 1982
      - †P. biradica J.A. Baskin, 1982
    - †Probassariscus Merriam, 1911
      - †P. matthewi Merriam, 1911
    - Procyon Storr, 1780
      - †P. gipsoni Emmert & Short, 2018
      - †P. megalokolos Emmert & Short, 2018
      - †P. rexroadensis Hibbard, 1941
    - †Protoprocyon Linares, 1981 [=Lichnocyon J.A. Baskin, 1982]
      - †P. savagei Linares, 1981 [=Lichnocyon savagei J.A. Baskin, 1982]
    - †Tetraprothomo Ameghino, 1908
      - †T. argentinus Ameghino, 1908
