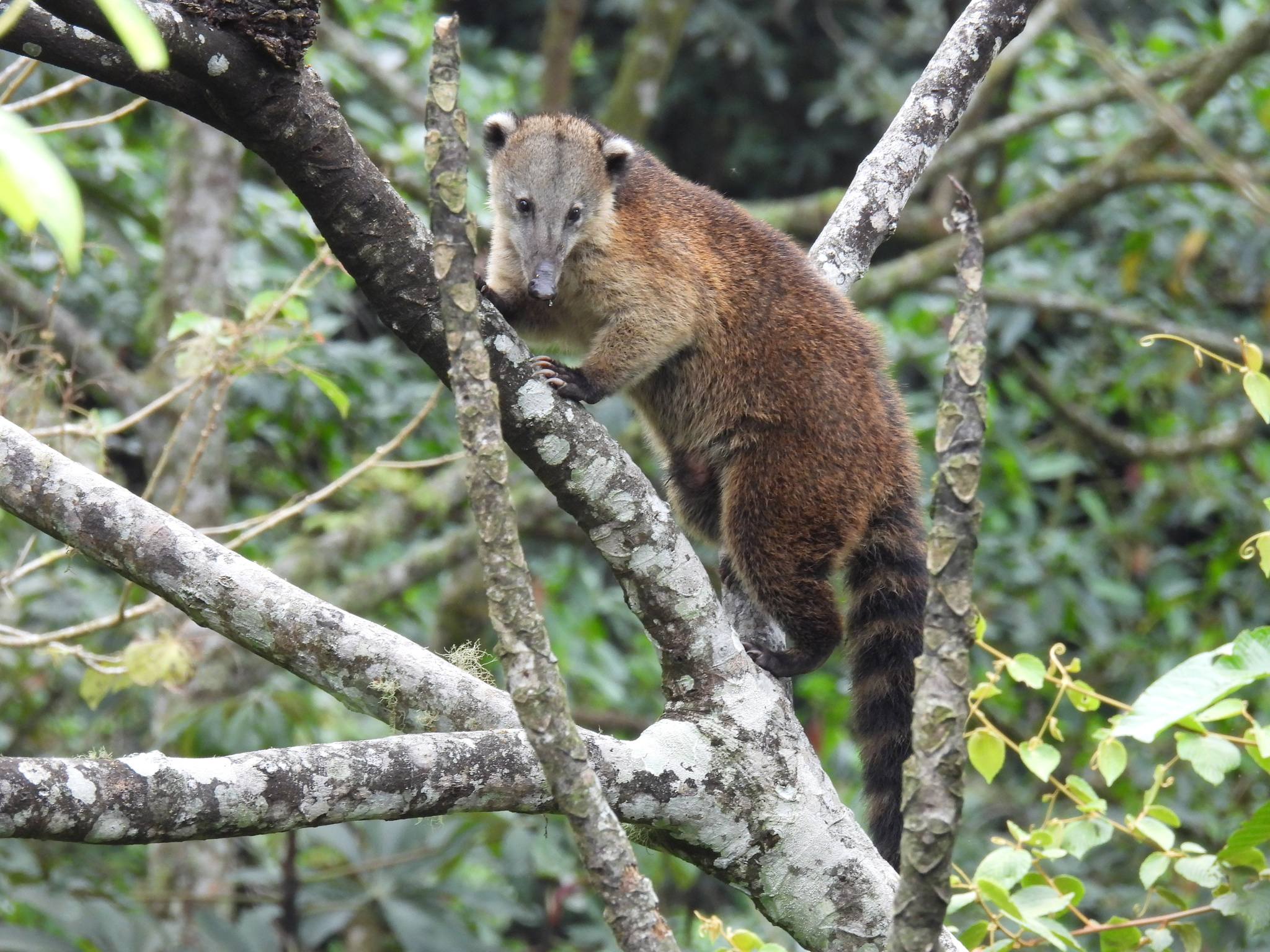
- N. olivacea in Colombia

Conservation status
- Near Threatened (IUCN 3.1)

Scientific classification
- Kingdom: Animalia
- Phylum: Chordata
- Class: Mammalia
- Order: Carnivora
- Family: Procyonidae
- Genus: Nasuella
- Species: N. olivacea

Binomial name
- Nasuella olivacea (J. E. Gray, 1865)
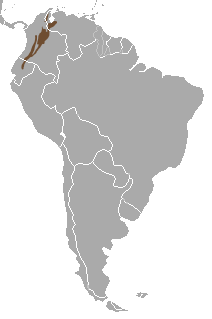

= Nasuella olivacea =

Species of carnivore

The western mountain coati or western dwarf coati (Nasuella olivacea) is a small procyonid, found in cloud forest and páramo at altitudes of 1,300–4,250 metres (4,270–13,940 ft) in the Andes of Colombia and Ecuador. A population discovered in the Apurímac–Cuzco region of southern Peru (more than 1,000 km or 620 mi south of the previous distribution limit) has tentatively been identified as the western mountain coati, but may represent an undescribed taxon.

Until 2009, the western mountain coati (then simply known as the mountain coati) usually included the eastern mountain coati as a subspecies, but that species is overall smaller, somewhat shorter-tailed on average, has markedly smaller teeth, a paler olive-brown pelage, and usually a dark mid-dorsal stripe on the back (versus more rufescent or blackish, and usually without a dark mid-dorsal stripe in the western mountain coati). When the two were combined, they were rated as Data Deficient by the IUCN, but following the split the western mountain coati is considered Near Threatened. After a genetic analysis in 2020, the American Society of Mammalogists currently considers N. meridensis a synonym of N. olivacea.

There are two subspecies of the western mountain coati: N. o. olivacea and the slightly smaller and darker N. o. quitensis with less distinct rings on the tail. The former is known from Colombia and the latter from Ecuador, but the exact distribution limit between the two is not known.
