= Christian Miguel Pinto =

Ecuadorian zoologist

Christian Miguel Pinto Baez (born January 3, 1981, in Quito, Ecuador), often stated as C. Miguel Pinto or Miguel Pinto, is an Ecuadorian zoologist noted for his research work on rodents, small carnivora, and bats from the Neotropics (in particular in Ecuador, Argentina, and Colombia) and their parasites. He was banned from the Smithsonian because of sexual harassment findings, and as of November 2016, held a research position at the National Polytechnic School in Quito, Ecuador.

== Career ==
In 2004, he described the bat species Lophostoma yasuni from the Yasuni National Park in Ecuador (together with René M. Fonseca). In 2006, he was among a team (including Roland Kays, Kristofer M. Helgen, Lauren Helgen, Don E. Wilson, and Jesús E. Maldonado) who did research work on a new olingo-like carnivore in the Ecuadorian Andes which was scientifically described as olinguito in 2013. In 2012, he was recipient of the Albert R. and Alma Shadle Fellowship In 2013, he described the new shrew opossum Caenolestes sangay from Ecuador.

Pinto has been accused of a number of instances of sexual harassment, some of which he admitted, and as a result in 2016 was banned from the laboratories and collections of the Smithsonian Museum of Natural History.

== Works ==
- Bernal XE, Pinto CM. 2016. Sexual differences in prevalence of a new species of trypanosome that infects túngara frogs. International Journal for Parasitology: Parasites and Wildlife 5: 40-47.
- Pinto CM, Soto-Centeno JA, Núñez Quiroz AM, Ferreyra N, Delgado-Espinoza F, Stahl PW, Tirira DG. 2016. Archaeology, biogeography and mammalogy do not provide evidence for tarukas (Cervidae: Hippocamelus antisensis) in Ecuador. Journal of Mammalogy 97: 41-53.
- Ojala-Barbour R, Pinto CM, Brito J, Albuja-V L, Lee Jr TE, Patterson BD. 2013. A new species of shrew-opossum (Paucituberculata: Caenolestidae) with a phylogeny of extant caenolestids. Journal of Mammalogy 94: 967-982.
- Helgen KM, Pinto CM, Kays R, Helgen LE, Tsuchiya MTN, Quinn A, Wilson DE, Maldonado JE. 2013. Taxonomic revision of the olingos (Bassaricyon), with description of a new species, the Olinguito. Zookeys 324: 1-83.
- Helgen KM., Kays R, Helgen LE, Tsuchiya-Jerep MTN, Pinto CM, Koepfli K, Eizirik E, Maldonado JE. 2009. Taxonomic boundaries and geographic distributions revealed by an integrative systematic overview of the mountain coatis, Nasuella (Carnivora: Procyonidae). Small Carnivore Conservation 41: 65-74.
