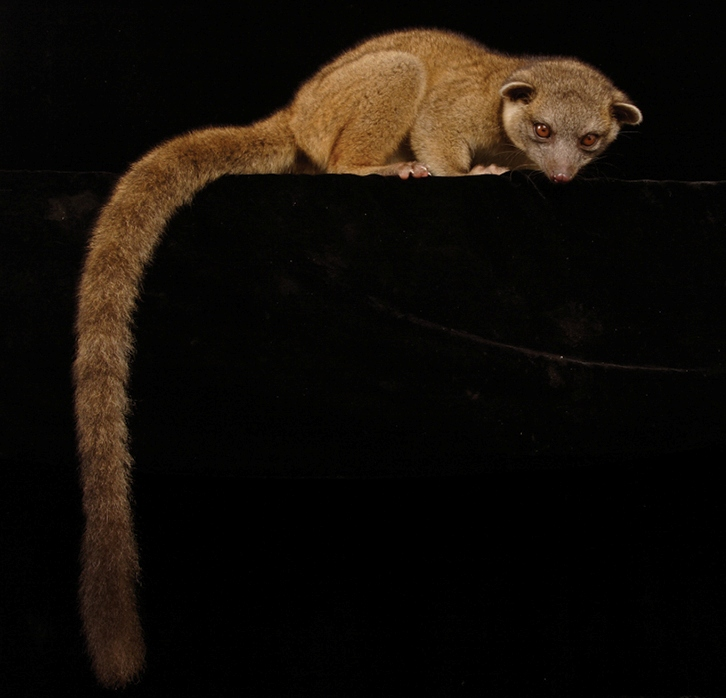
- Sitting on a branch

Conservation status
- Least Concern (IUCN 3.1)

Scientific classification
- Kingdom: Animalia
- Phylum: Chordata
- Class: Mammalia
- Order: Carnivora
- Family: Procyonidae
- Genus: Bassaricyon
- Species: B. medius

Binomial name
- Bassaricyon medius Thomas, 1909
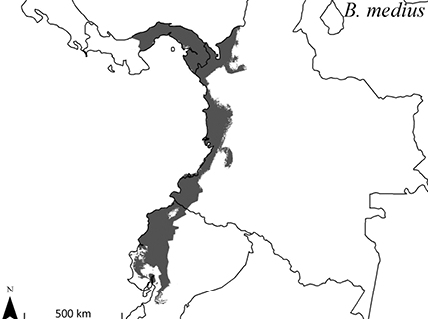
- Distribution of the western lowland olingo

Synonyms
- Bassariscyon gabbi orinomus Goldman, 1912

= Western lowland olingo =

Species of carnivore

The western lowland olingo (Bassaricyon medius) is a species of olingo from Central and South America, where it is known from Panama and from Colombia and Ecuador west of the Andes.

== Description ==
The western lowland olingo is smaller than the northern olingo, but larger than the most montane member of the genus, the recently described olinguito ("little olingo"). While the Panamanian subspecies B. m. orinomus is about the same size as the eastern lowland olingo, the subspecies from west of the Andes, B. m. medius is smaller. The pelage is slightly lighter than that of the eastern species.

It has a head-body length of 31 to 41 centimetres (12 to 16 in), with a tail length of 35 to 52 centimetres (14 to 20 in). It weighs .9 to 1.2 kilograms (2.0 to 2.6 lb).

== Taxonomy ==
There are two subspecies of the western lowland olingo: the nominate B. m. medius (Colombia and Ecuador) and B. m. orinomus (Panama and possibly Colombia). The closest relative of the western lowland olingo is the other lowland olingo species, B. alleni, found east of the Andes, from which it diverged about 1.3 million years ago.
