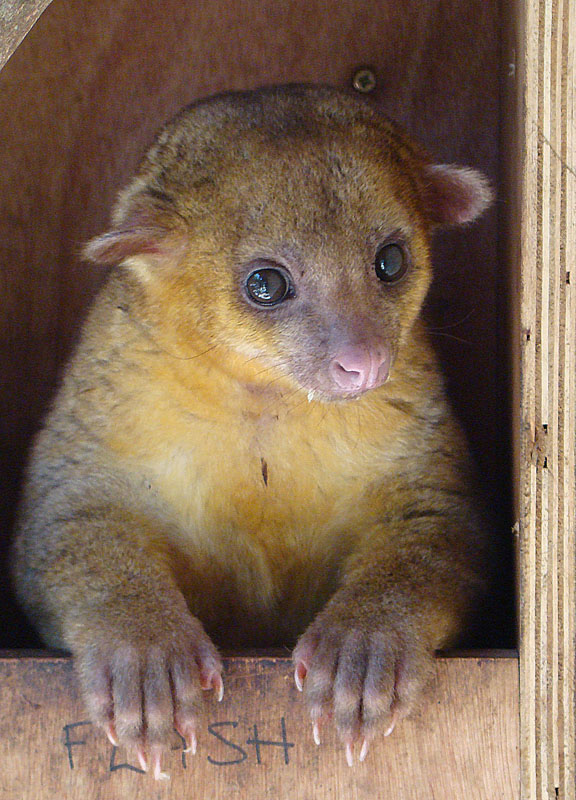

Conservation status
- Least Concern (IUCN 3.1)
- CITES Appendix III

Scientific classification
- Kingdom: Animalia
- Phylum: Chordata
- Class: Mammalia
- Order: Carnivora
- Family: Procyonidae
- Subfamily: Potosinae
- Genus: Potos; Geoffroy Saint-Hilaire & G. Cuvier, 1795
- Species: P. flavus

Binomial name
- Potos flavus (Schreber, 1774)

Subspecies
- List: P. f. chapadensis J. A. Allen, 1904; P. f. chiriquensis J. A. Allen, 1904; P. f. flavus (Schreber, 1774); P. f. megalotus (Martin, 1836); P. f. meridensis Thomas, 1902; P. f. modestus Thomas, 1902; P. f. nocturnus (Wied, 1826); P. f. prehensilis (Kerr, 1792)
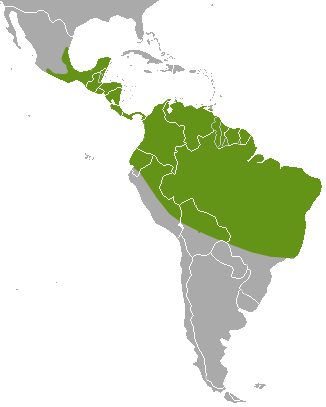
- Distribution of kinkajou (2010)

Synonyms
- List: Cercoleptes brachyotos Schinz, 1844; C. brachyotus Martin, 1836; C. lepida Illiger, 1815; C. megalotus Martin, 1836; Lemur flavus Schreber, 1774; Mustela potto Muller, 1776; Nasua nocturna Wied, 1826; Viverra caudivolvula Schreber, 1778; V. prehensilis Kerr, 1792

= Kinkajou =

South American mammal (Potos flavus)

The kinkajou (/ˈkɪŋkədʒuː/ KING-kə-joo; Potos flavus) is a mammal of the family Procyonidae, a relative to olingos, coatis, raccoons, and the ringtail and cacomistle. It is the only member of the genus Potos and is also known as the honey bear (a name shared with several unrelated species). Though kinkajous are arboreal, they are not closely related to any other tree-dwelling mammal group (primates, mustelids, etc.).

Native to tropical rainforests of Mexico, Central and South America, this mostly frugivorous mammal is seldom seen by people because of its strict nocturnal habits. However, it is hunted for the pet trade, its skin (to make wallets and horse saddles), and its meat. The species has been included in Appendix III of CITES by Honduras, which means that exports from Honduras require an export permit, and exports from other countries require a certificate of origin or of re-export. They may live up to 40 years in captivity.

== Nomenclature ==
=== Etymology ===
The common name kinkajou derives from French quincajou, based on the Algonquian name for the wolverine. It is similar to the Ojibwe word gwiingwaʼaage, perhaps from a Proto-Algonquian *kwi·nkwaʔa·ke. Its other names in English include honey bear, night ape, and night walker. Throughout its range, several regional names are used; for instance, the Dutch names nachtaap, rolbeer, and rolstaartbeer are used in Suriname. Local names in Portuguese and Spanish include jupará, yapará, huasa, cuchi cuchi, leoncillo, marta, and perro de monte; many of these come from indigenous languages such as Old Tupi.

=== Taxonomy ===
A. M. Husson, of the Rijksmuseum van Natuurlijke Historie (Leiden), discussed the rather complicated nomenclature of the kinkajou in The Mammals of Suriname (1978). In his 1774 work Die Säugethiere in Abbildungen nach der Natur, Schreber listed three items under the name "Lemur flavus Penn.": on page 145 is a short translation of Pennant's description of the yellow maucauco (later identified to be Lemur mongoz, presently known as the mongoose lemur) from his 1771 work A Synopsis of Quadrupeds (page 138, second figure on plate 16); on plate 42 is a depiction of the yellow maucauco by Schreber; the last item is a reference to A Synopsis of Quadrupeds itself. Husson noted that the last item is actually Pennant's description of an animal that is clearly a kinkajou. Husson therefore concluded that Lemur flavus is actually a "composite species" based on Schreber's specimen of the mongoose lemur and Pennant's specimen of the kinkajou, and identified the latter as the lectotype for the species. The type locality reported by Schreber for L. flavus ("the mountains in Jamaica") was clearly based on Pennant's description of the kinkajou, who claimed, however, that his specimen was "shown about three years ago in London: its keeper said it came from the mountains of Jamaica". This error was pointed out by Thomas in 1902, who corrected the type locality to Suriname. He used the name Potos flavus for the kinkajou. The genus Potos was erected by Saint-Hilaire and Cuvier in 1795, with the type species Viverra caudivolvula described by Schreber in 1778 (later identified as a synonym of Potos flavus). In 1977 the family Cercoleptidae was proposed with the kinkajou as the sole member, but this classification was later dismissed.

=== Subspecies ===
Eight subspecies have been proposed (type localities are listed alongside):

- P. f. chapadensis J. A. Allen, 1904: Chapadas of Mato Grosso (Brazil)
- P. f. chiriquensis J. A. Allen, 1904: Boquerón, Chiriquí Province (Panama)
- P. f. flavus (Schreber, 1774): Suriname. Synonyms include Cercoleptes brachyotos, C. brachyotus, Mustela potto, and Viverra caudivolvula
- P. f. megalotus (Martin, 1836): Santa Marta (Colombia)
- P. f. meridensis Thomas, 1902: Mérida (Venezuela)
- P. f. modestus Thomas, 1902: Montes Balzar, Guayas Province (Ecuador)
- P. f. nocturnus (Wied, 1826): São Miguel dos Campos, Alagoas (Brazil)
- P. f. prehensilis (Kerr, 1792): Veracruz (Mexico)

- - Costa Rica (clade 1)
  - - Northern Brazil and the Guianas (clade 2)
    - - Ecuador and Panama (clade 4)
      - - Northern Peru (clade 3)
        - Interfluves; Bolivia, western Brazil and Peru; eastern Atlantic forest (clade 5)

The five clades within P. flavus

A 2016 phylogenetic study based on mitochondrial gene cytochrome b analyzed kinkajou specimens from a variety of locations throughout most of their range. The results showed 27 haplotypes split into five clades corresponding to geographical divisions: Costa Rica (clade 1), northern Brazil and the Guianas (clade 2), northern Peru (clade 3), Ecuador and Panama (clade 4), interfluves between the Branco River and Rio Negro in the Brazilian Amazon, low-lying Amazonian areas (in Bolivia, western Brazil and Peru), and eastern Atlantic Forest (clade 5). Given the diverse clades, the researchers suggested that some of the subspecies might be independent species.

== Evolution ==
Molecular phylogenetic evidence indicates that kinkajous are the sister group to all other lineages within Procyonidae, having diverged from the rest of the Procyonidae 24 to 21.6 million years ago, in the Late Oligocene-Early Miocene. Subsequent evolutionary radiation would lead to two clades, one leading to Bassaricyon (olingos and the olinguito) plus Nasua (coatis), and another leading to Bassariscus (the ringtail and the cacomistle) plus Procyon (racoons); both appeared during the Miocene (23.8 to 5.3 million years ago).

Kinkajous are thought to have evolved in North America and entered South America as part of the Great American Interchange that followed the formation of the Isthmus of Panama. The phylogenetic relationships obtained in Koepfli et al. (2007) are given below; these were supported by subsequent studies.

- Procyonidae
  - - - Bassaricyon (olingos and olinguito)
      - Nasua and Nasuella (coaties)
    - - Procyon (raccoons)
      - Bassariscus (ring-tailed cat and cacomistle)
  - Potos (kinkajou)

== Physical characteristics ==
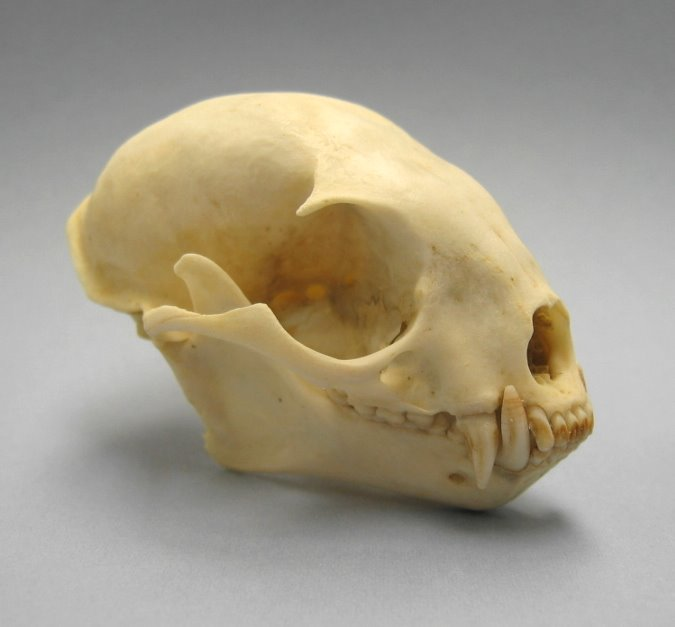
Kinkajou skull

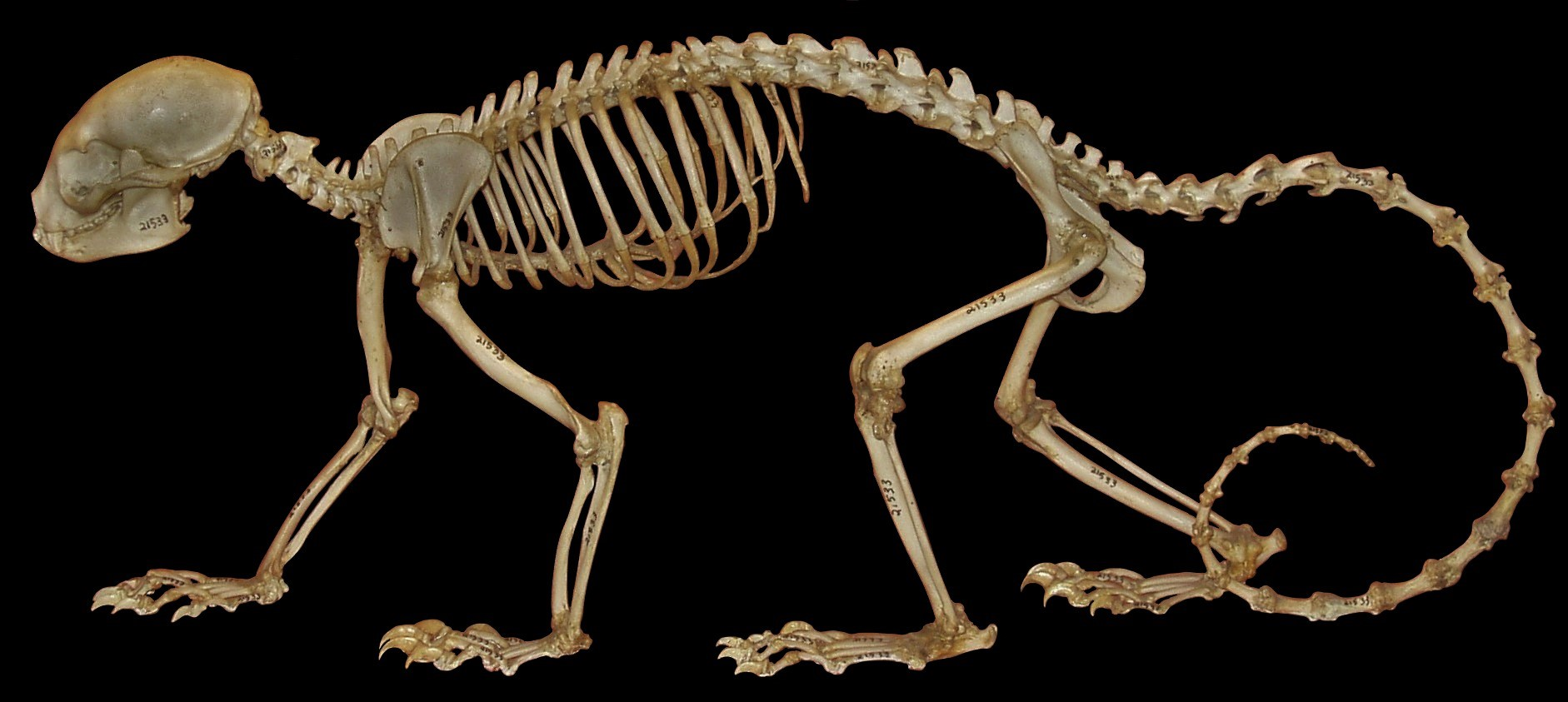
Skeleton

The kinkajou has a round head, large eyes, a short, pointed snout, short limbs, and a long prehensile tail. The total head-and-body length (including the tail) is between 82 and 133 cm (32 and 52 in), and the tail measures 39 to 57 cm (15 to 22 in). Its mature weight ranges from 1.4 to 4.6 kg (3.1 to 10.1 lb). Females are generally smaller than males. The short, rounded ears measure 3.6 to 5.4 cm (1.4 to 2.1 in). The eyes reflect green or bright yellow against light. The long, thick tongue is highly extrudable. The snout is dark brown to black. The claws are sharp and short.

The coat color varies throughout the range and at different times of the year. Several shades such as tawny olive, wood brown, and yellowish tawny have been reported for the upper part of the coat and the upper side of the tail, while the underparts and the lower side of the tail have been observed to be buff, tawny, or brownish yellow. Some individuals have a black stripe running along the midline of the back. The color seems to become lighter from the south to the north, though no seasonal trends have been observed. The fur is short, woolly and dense. Hairs are of two types - light yellowish and darker with brown tips. The darker hairs reflect light poorly relative to the lighter ones, often creating an illusion of spots and dark lines on the coat. The tail is covered with thick fur up to the end.

The kinkajou is distinguished from other procyonids by its small, rounded ears, extensible tongue, and prehensile tail. Olingos are similar enough in appearance that many native cultures do not distinguish the two. Compared to olingos, kinkajous are larger, have foreshortened muzzles, and lack anal scent glands (in addition to the previously described differences). The binturong, a Southeast Asian viverrid, has similar limb proportions and is the only other carnivoran with a prehensile tail, though it is much larger in stature. The kinkajou resembles neotropical monkeys in having a prehensile tail and big, forward-facing eyes, but has a different dentition and heavy fur on the soles of the feet.

== Range and habitat ==
Kinkajous range from east and south of the Sierra Madre in Mexico, throughout Central America to Bolivia east of the Andes and the Atlantic Forest of southeastern Brazil. Their altitudinal range is from sea level to 2,500 m (8,200 ft). They are found in closed-canopy tropical forests, including lowland rainforest, montane forest, dry forest, gallery forest, and secondary forest. Deforestation is thus a potential threat to the species.

== Biology ==
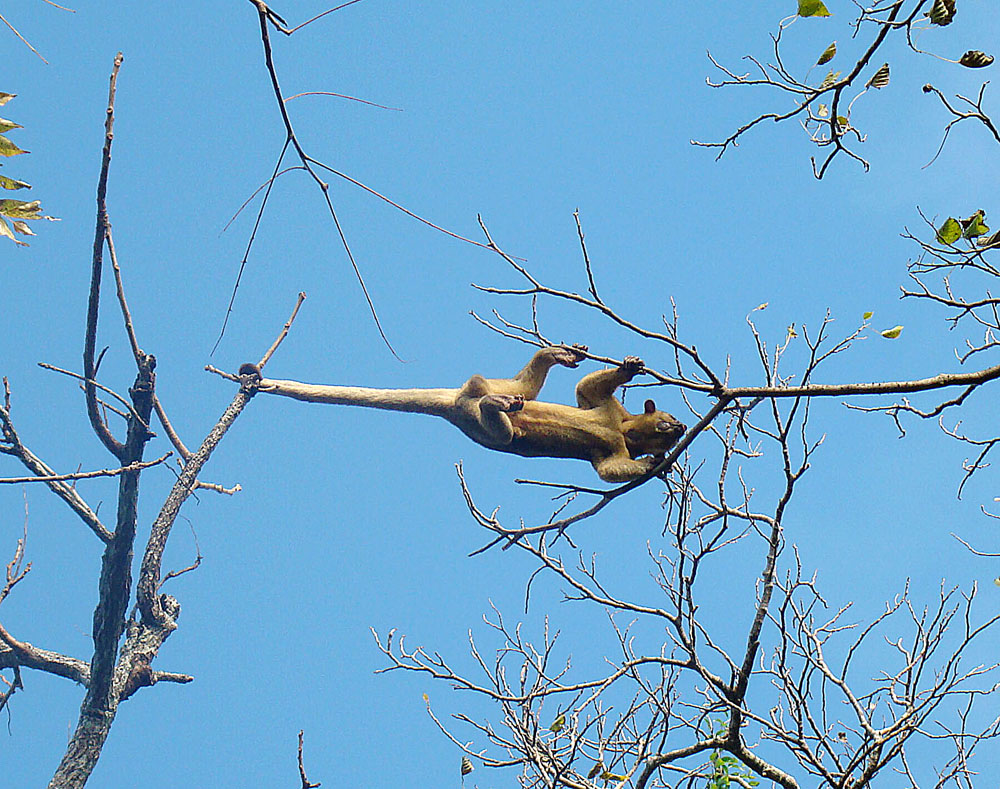
Kinkajou using its prehensile tail

Kinkajou spend most of their lives in trees, to which they are particularly well adapted. Like raccoons, kinkajous' remarkable manipulatory abilities rival those of primates. The kinkajou has a short-haired, fully prehensile tail (like some New World monkeys), which it uses as a "fifth hand" in climbing. It does not use its tail for grasping food. It can rotate its ankles and feet 180°, making it easy for the animal to run backward over tree limbs and climb down trees headfirst. Scent glands near the mouth, on the throat, and on the belly allow kinkajous to mark their territory and their travel routes. Kinkajous sleep in family units and groom one another.

As a nocturnal animal, the kinkajou's peak activity is usually between about 7:00 pm and midnight, and again an hour before dawn. During daylight hours, kinkajous sleep in tree hollows or in shaded tangles of leaves, avoiding direct sunlight.

Kinkajous breed throughout the year, giving birth to one or occasionally two small babies after a gestation period of 112 to 118 days.

=== Feeding ===
Although the kinkajou is classified in the order Carnivora and has sharp teeth, its omnivorous diet consists mainly of fruit, particularly figs. Some 90% of their diet consists of (primarily ripe) fruit. To eat softer fruits, they hold it with their forepaws, then scoop out the succulent pulp with their tongue. They may play an important role in seed dispersal. Leaves, flowers, nectar, and various herbs make up much of the other 10% of their diet. They sometimes eat insects, particularly ants. They may occasionally eat bird eggs and small vertebrates. Their frugivorous habits are convergent with those of diurnal spider monkeys, with the two species filling similar ecological roles where they overlap, but at different times of the day.

The kinkajou's slender 5-inch (13 cm) extrudable tongue helps the animal to obtain fruit and to lick nectar from flowers, so it may act as a pollinator. (Nectar is also sometimes obtained by eating entire flowers.) Although captive specimens avidly eat honey (hence the name "honey bear"), honey in the diet of wild kinkajous is not well reported.

While they are usually solitary when foraging, they occasionally forage in large groups, and sometimes associate with olingos (which are also nocturnal arboreal frugivores). The larger kinkajous are dominant and will drive olingos away when food is scarce. Kinkajous have a much more extensive range than olingos and tend to be more common. However, olingos may have greater agility, perhaps facilitating their sympatry with kinkajous.

== As pets ==
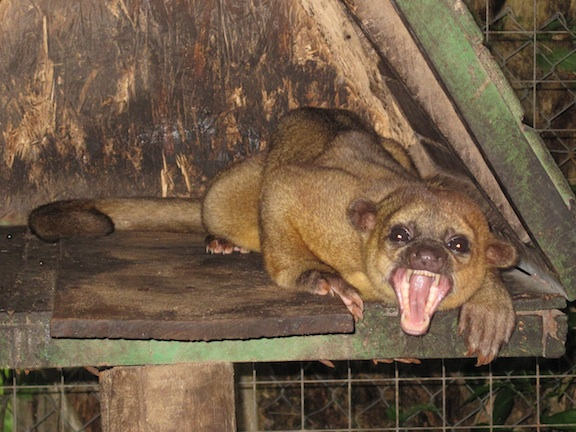
Kinkajou yawns in a Costa Rican animal shelter

Kinkajous are sometimes kept as exotic pets. They are playful, generally quiet, docile, and have little odor, but they can occasionally be aggressive. Kinkajous dislike sudden movements, noise, and being awake during the day. An agitated kinkajou may emit a scream and attack, usually clawing its victim and sometimes biting deeply. In 2011, the Centers for Disease Control and Prevention reported that pet kinkajous in the United States can be carriers (fecal–oral route) of the raccoon roundworm Baylisascaris procyonis, which is capable of causing severe morbidity and even death in humans if the brain is infected. In 2023, National Geographic reported that escaped kinkajou pets were living in Florida.

In El Salvador, Guatemala, and Honduras, pet kinkajous are commonly called micoleón, meaning "lion monkey". In Peru, pet kinkajous are frequently referred to as lirón (the Spanish word for dormice), often described as a "bear-monkey". These names reflect its monkey-like body and obviously carnivoran head.

They typically live about 23 years in captivity, with a maximum recorded lifespan of 42 years.
