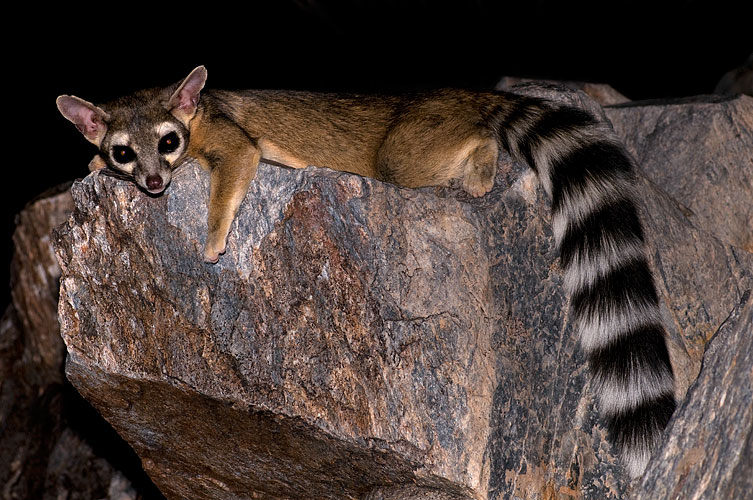
- Ringtail in Phoenix, Arizona

Conservation status
- Least Concern (IUCN 3.1)

Scientific classification
- Kingdom: Animalia
- Phylum: Chordata
- Class: Mammalia
- Order: Carnivora
- Family: Procyonidae
- Genus: Bassariscus
- Species: B. astutus

Binomial name
- Bassariscus astutus (Lichtenstein, 1830)

Subspecies
- Bassariscus a. astutus; Bassariscus a. arizonensis; Bassariscus a. flavus; Bassariscus a. yumanensis; Bassariscus a. nevadensis
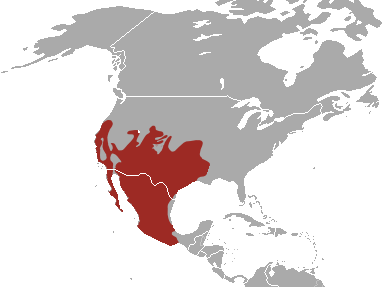
- Ring-tailed cat range

= Ringtail =

Species of mammal

The ringtail (Bassariscus astutus) is a mammal of the raccoon family native to arid regions of North America. It is widely distributed and well-adapted to its distributed areas. It has been legally trapped for its fur. Globally, it is listed as Least Concern on the IUCN Red List but is a Conservation Strategy Species in Oregon and Fully Protected in California. The ringtail is the state mammal of Arizona.

The species is known by a variety of common names, such as ring-tailed cat, miner's cat, civet cat, and cacomistle (or cacomixtle), though as a relative of the raccoon, the ringtail is only distantly related to Feliform true cats and civets, and "cacomistle" can also refer to B. sumichrasti.

== Description ==
The ringtail is black to dark brown in color with pale underparts. The animal has a pointed muzzle with long whiskers, similar to that of a fox (its Latin name means 'clever little fox') and its body resembles that of a cat. The ringtail's face resembles a mask as dark brown and black hair surround its eyes.

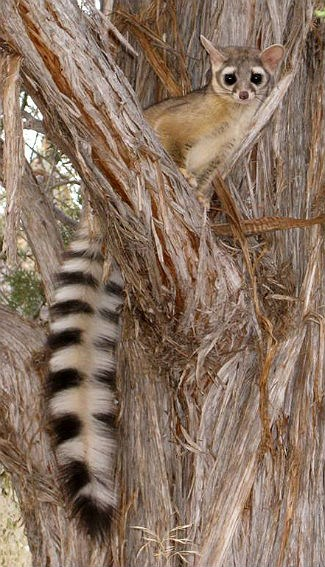
Ringtail in tree in Zion N.P.

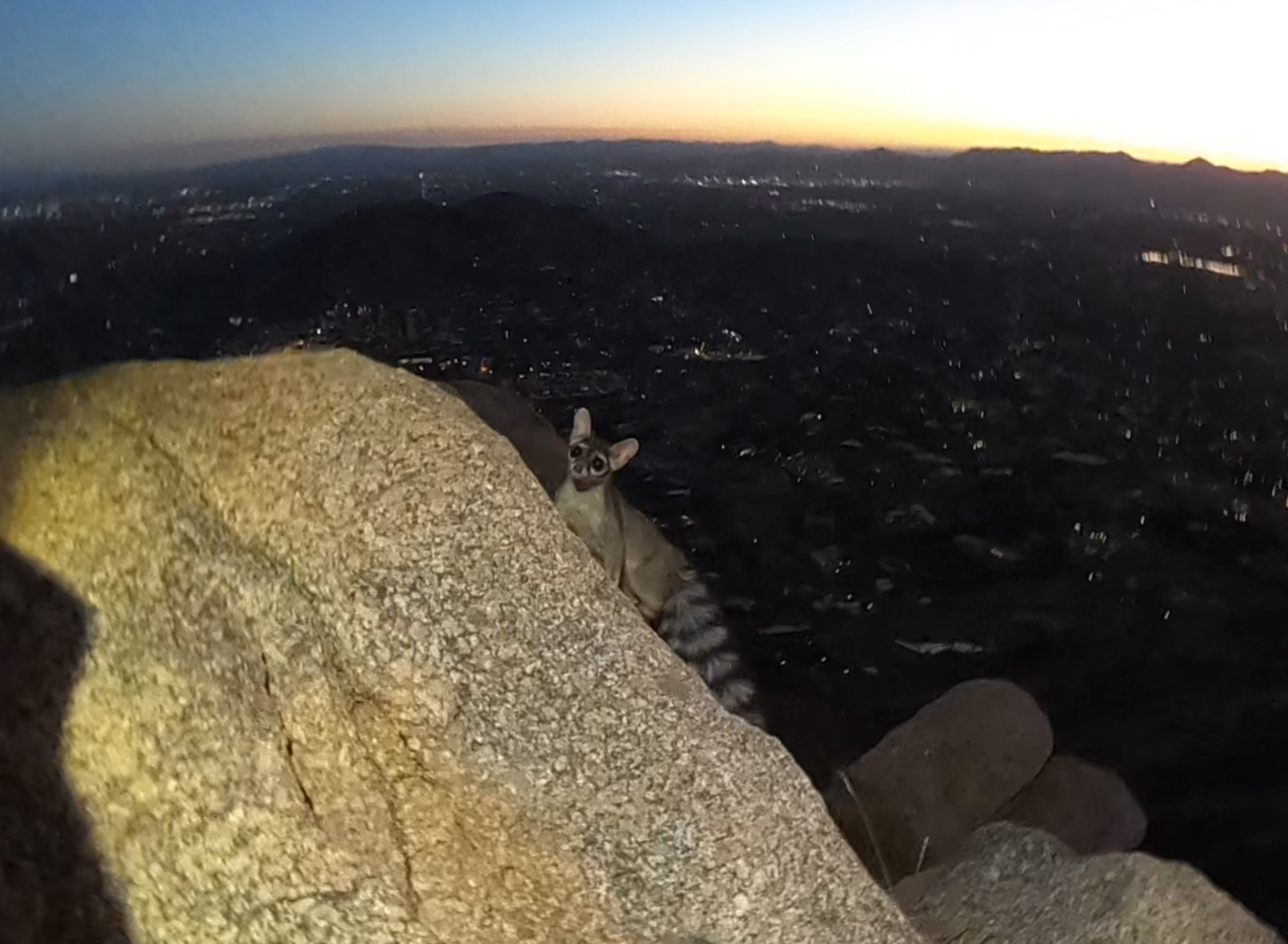
Ringtail on Camelback Mountain, Phoenix, Arizona

These animals are characterized by a long black and white "ringed" tail with 14–16 stripes, which is about the same length as its body.

Ringtails are primarily nocturnal, with large eyes and upright ears that make it easier for them to navigate and forage in the dark. An adept climber, it uses its long tail for balance. The rings on its tail can also act as a distraction for predators. The white rings act as a target, so when the tail rather than the body is caught, the ringtail has a greater chance of escaping.

The claws are short, straight, and semi-retractable, well-suited for climbing.

Smaller than a house cat, it is one of the smallest extant procyonids (only the smallest in the olingo species group average smaller). Its body alone measures 30–42 cm (12–17 in) and its tail averages 31–44 cm (12–17 in) from its base. It typically weighs around 0.7 to 1.5 kg (1.5 to 3.3 lb).

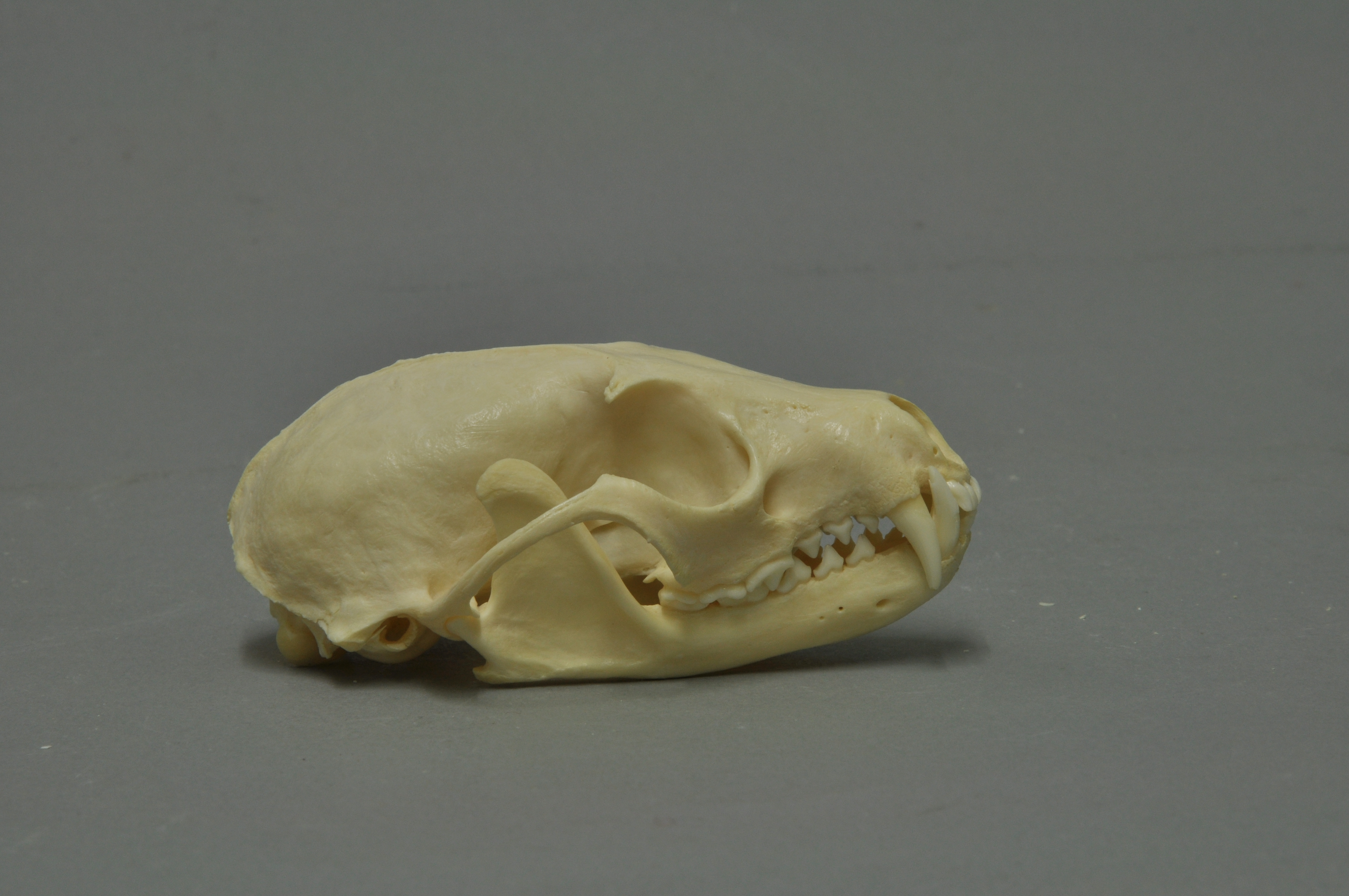
Skull of a ringtail

Its dental formula is 3.1.4.23.1.4.2 = 40.

The ankle joint is flexible and is able to rotate over 180 degrees, making the animal an agile climber. The long tail provides balance for negotiating narrow ledges and limbs, even allowing individuals to reverse directions by performing a cartwheel. Ringtails also can ascend narrow passages by stemming (pressing all feet on one wall and their back against the other or pressing both right feet on one wall and both left feet on the other), and wider cracks or openings by ricocheting between the walls.

As adults, these mammals lead solitary lives, generally coming together only to mate. A typical call is a very loud, plaintive bark. They produce a variety of sounds, including clicks and chatters reminiscent of raccoons.

Ringtails have been reported to exhibit fecal marking behavior as a form of intraspecific communication to define territory boundaries or attract potential mates. It has been suggested that ringtails use feces as a way to mark territory. In 2003, a study in Mexico City found that ringtails tended to defecate in similar areas in a seemingly nonrandom pattern, mimicking that of other carnivores that utilized excretions to mark territories.

Ringtails prefer a solitary existence but may share a den or be found mutually grooming one another. They exhibit limited interaction except during the breeding season, which occurs in the early spring. Ringtails can survive for long periods on water derived from food alone, and have urine which is more concentrated than any other mammal studied, an adaptation that allows for maximum water retention.

== Reproduction ==
Ringtails mate in the spring. The gestation period is 45–50 days, during which the male will procure food for the female. There will be 2–4 kits in a litter. The cubs open their eyes after one month, and will hunt for themselves after four months. They reach sexual maturity at 10 months. The ringtail's lifespan in the wild is about seven years.

== Range and habitat ==
The ringtail is commonly found in rocky desert habitats, where it nests in the hollows of trees or abandoned wooden structures. It has been found throughout the Great Basin Desert, which stretches over several states (Nevada, Utah, California, Idaho, and Oregon) as well as the Sonoran Desert in Arizona, and the Chihuahuan Desert in New Mexico, Texas, and northern Mexico. The ringtail also prefers rocky habitats associated with water, such as riparian canyons, caves, or mine shafts.

In areas with a bountiful source of water, as many as 50 ringtails/sq. mile (20/km^{2}) have been found. Ranging from 50 to 100 acres (20 to 40 ha), the territories of male ringtails occasionally intersect with several females.

The ringtail is found in the Southwestern United States in southern Oregon, California, eastern Kansas, Oklahoma, Arizona, New Mexico, Colorado, southern Nevada, Utah, Louisiana and Texas. In Mexico it ranges from the northern desert state of Baja California to Oaxaca. Its distribution overlaps that of B. sumichrasti in the Mexican states of Guerrero, Oaxaca, and Veracruz.

Fossils assigned to B. astutus dating back to the early Pliocene epoch have been found as far north as Washington.

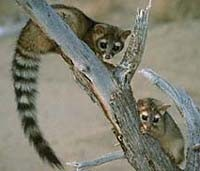
Two ringtails

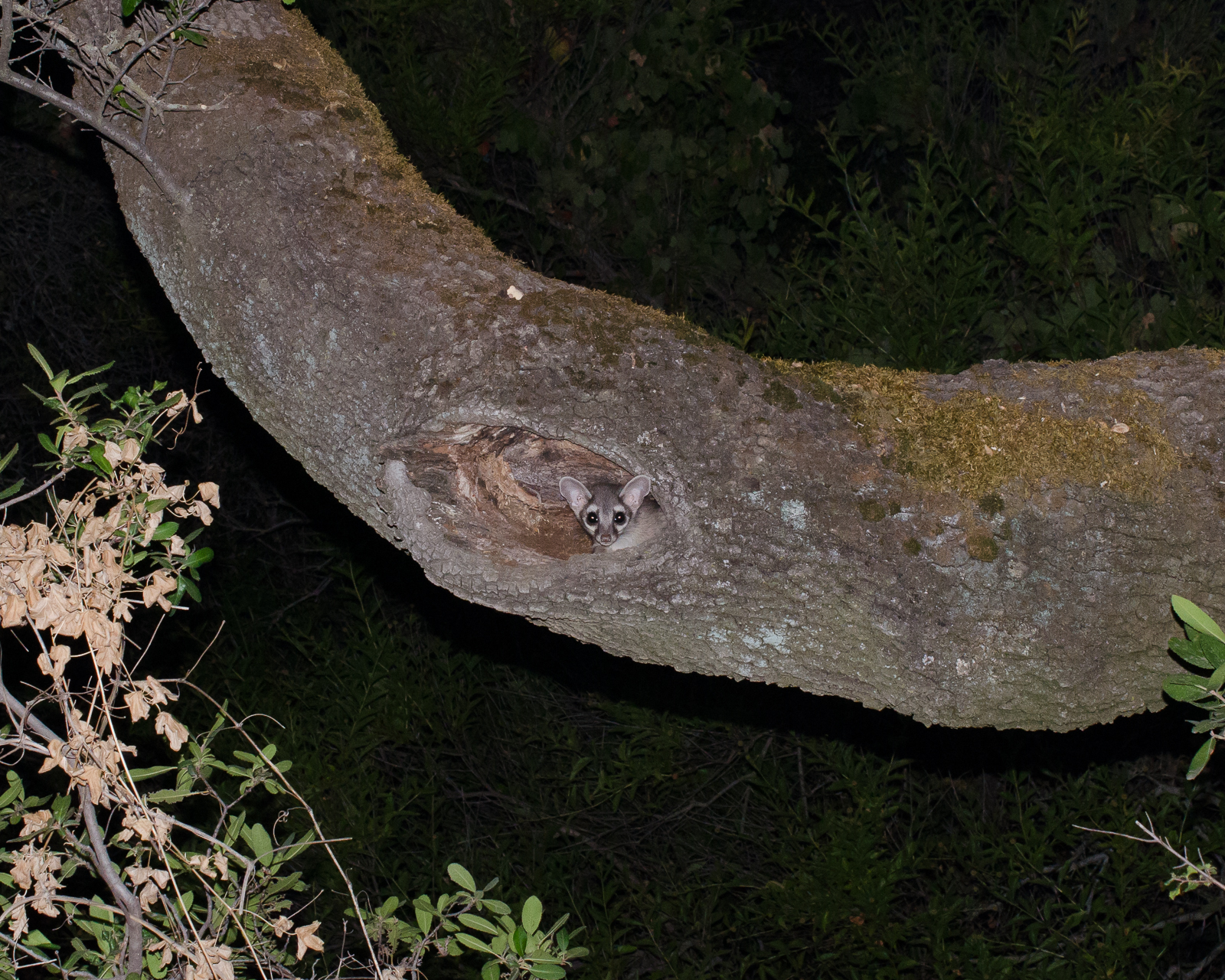
Ringtail den

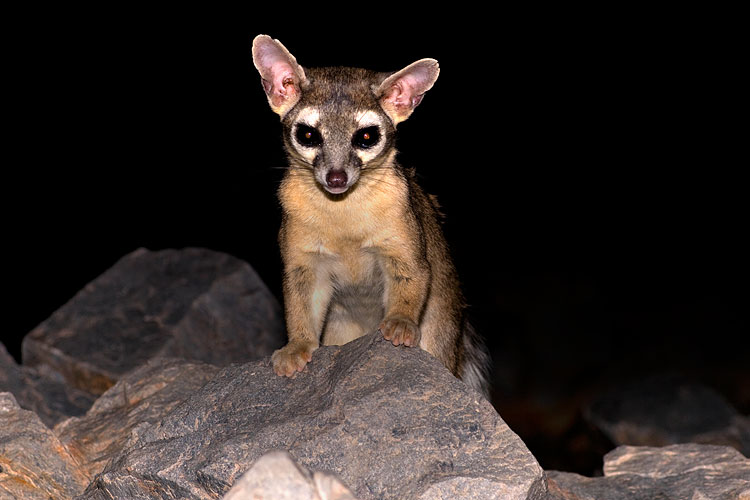
Ringtail in Phoenix, Arizona

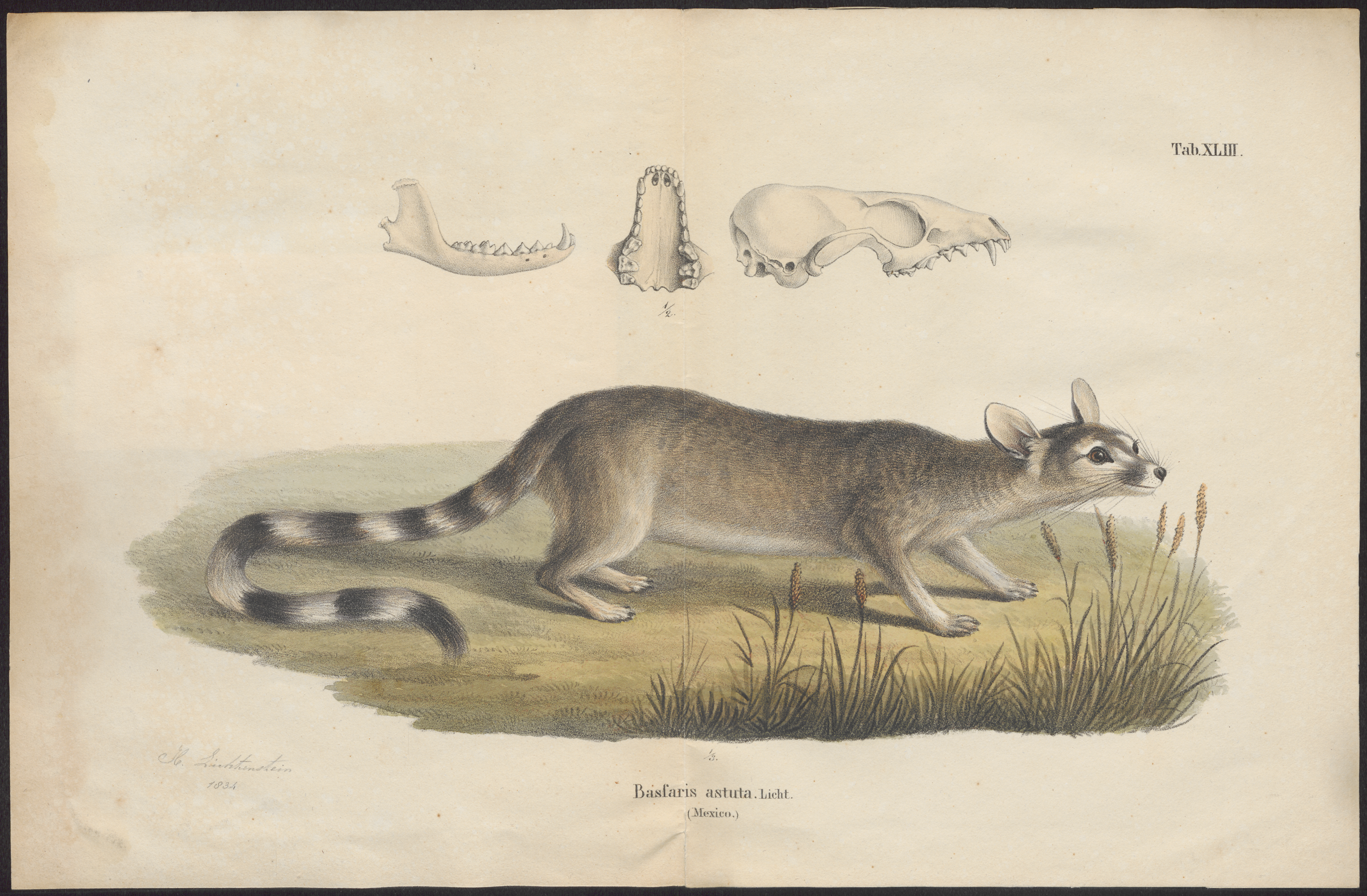
Bassaris astuta print from Iconographia Zoologica (1700–1880)

== Diet ==
Small vertebrates such as passerine birds, rats, mice, squirrels, rabbits, snakes, lizards, frogs, and toads are the most important foods during winters. However, the ringtail is omnivorous, as are all procyonids. Berries and insects are important in the diet year-round, and become the primary part of the diet in spring and summer, along with other fruit.

As an omnivore the ringtail enjoys a variety of foods in its diet, the majority of which is made up of animal matter. Insects and small mammals such as rabbits, mice, rats and ground squirrels are some examples of the ringtail's carnivorous tendencies. Occasionally the ringtail will also eat fish, lizards, birds, snakes and carrion. The ringtail also enjoys juniper, hack and black berries, persimmon, prickly pear, and fruit in general. They have even been observed partaking from birdseed feeders, hummingbird feeders, sweet nectar or sweetened water.

The results of a study of scat from ringtails on Isla San José, Baja California Sur, showed that the ringtail tended to prey on whatever was most abundant during each respective season. During the spring the ringtail's diet consisted largely of insects, showing up in about 50% of the analyzed feces. Small rodents, snakes, and some lizards were also present. Plant matter was presented in large amounts, around 59% of the collected feces contained some type of plant, with fruits of Phaulothamnus, Lycium, and Solanum most common. The large amount of ironwood seeds and leaves demonstrated that these fleshy fruits were an obvious favorite of the ringtail.

== Ecology ==
Foxes, coyotes, raccoons, bobcats, hawks, and owls opportunistically prey upon ringtails of all ages, though predominantly on younger, more vulnerable specimens. Also occasional prey to coatis, lynxes, and mountain lions, the ringtail is rather adept at avoiding predators. The ringtail's success in deterring potential predators is largely attributed to its ability to excrete musk when startled or threatened. The main predators of the ringtail are the great horned owl and the red-tailed hawk.

Ringtails have occasionally been hunted for their pelts, but the fur is not especially valuable. Fur trapping has slowed down considerably, but current population sizes and growth rates remain unclear.

== Tameability ==
Ringtail are said to be easily tamed / habituated to humans, and can make an affectionate pet and effective mouser. Miners and settlers once kept pet ringtails to keep their cabins free of vermin; hence, the common name of "miner's cat".
