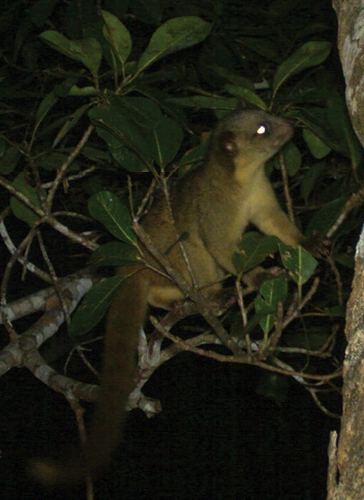
- Yambrasbamba, Bongará, Amazonas, Peru.

Conservation status
- Least Concern (IUCN 3.1)

Scientific classification
- Kingdom: Animalia
- Phylum: Chordata
- Class: Mammalia
- Order: Carnivora
- Family: Procyonidae
- Genus: Bassaricyon
- Species: B. alleni

Binomial name
- Bassaricyon alleni Thomas, 1880
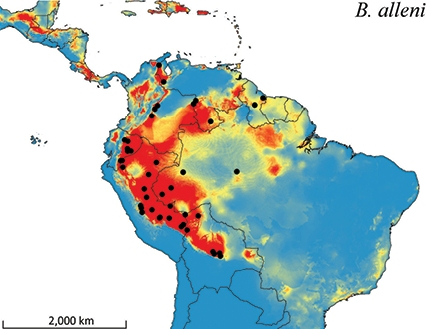
- Black points mark the range of B. alleni

Synonyms
- Bassaricyon beddardi Pocock, 1921; Bassaricyon medius siccatus Thomas, 1927

= Eastern lowland olingo =

Species of mammal

The eastern lowland olingo (Bassaricyon alleni) is a species of olingo from South America. The species is named after Joel Asaph Allen, the American zoologist who first described the genus. It is classified as Least Concern in the IUCN Red List.

== Taxonomy ==
The eastern lowland olingo is a species in the genus Bassaricyon, within the family Procyonidae, which also includes raccoons, coatis, and kinkajous. The species is named after American zoologist Joel Asaph Allen, who first described the genus. The species itself was described by Oldfield Thomas in 1880.

== Distribution and habitat ==
The olingo occurs across most of South America from the lowlands east of the Andes in Bolivia, Brazil, Colombia, Ecuador, Guyana, Peru and Venezuela. It is the only olingo species found east of the Andes. The closest relative of the eastern lowland olingo is the Western lowland olingo, from which it diverged about 1.3 million years ago. It is classified as Least Concern in the IUCN Red List.

== Description and behavior ==
The eastern lowland olingo is smaller than the northern olingo, but is larger than the little olingo, the most montane member of the genus. It is larger than the western lowland olingo subspecies Bassaricyon medius medius from west of the Andes, but about the same size as the Bassaricyon medius orinomus subspecies from eastern Panama. The pelage is slightly darker than the western species. It has a head-body length of 30 to 45 centimetres (12 to 18 in), with a tail length of 40 to 53 centimetres (16 to 21 in), and weighs 1.1 to 1.5 kilograms (2.4 to 3.3 lb). It has large eyes adapted for nocturnal vision, and short, rounded ears. The fur is soft brownish-gray with the long tail aiding in balance and gripping during arboreal movement.

The olingo is primarily nocturnal, and spend most of the day on tree tops or dens. They are omnivorous and consume fruits and flowers, insects and other small prey.
