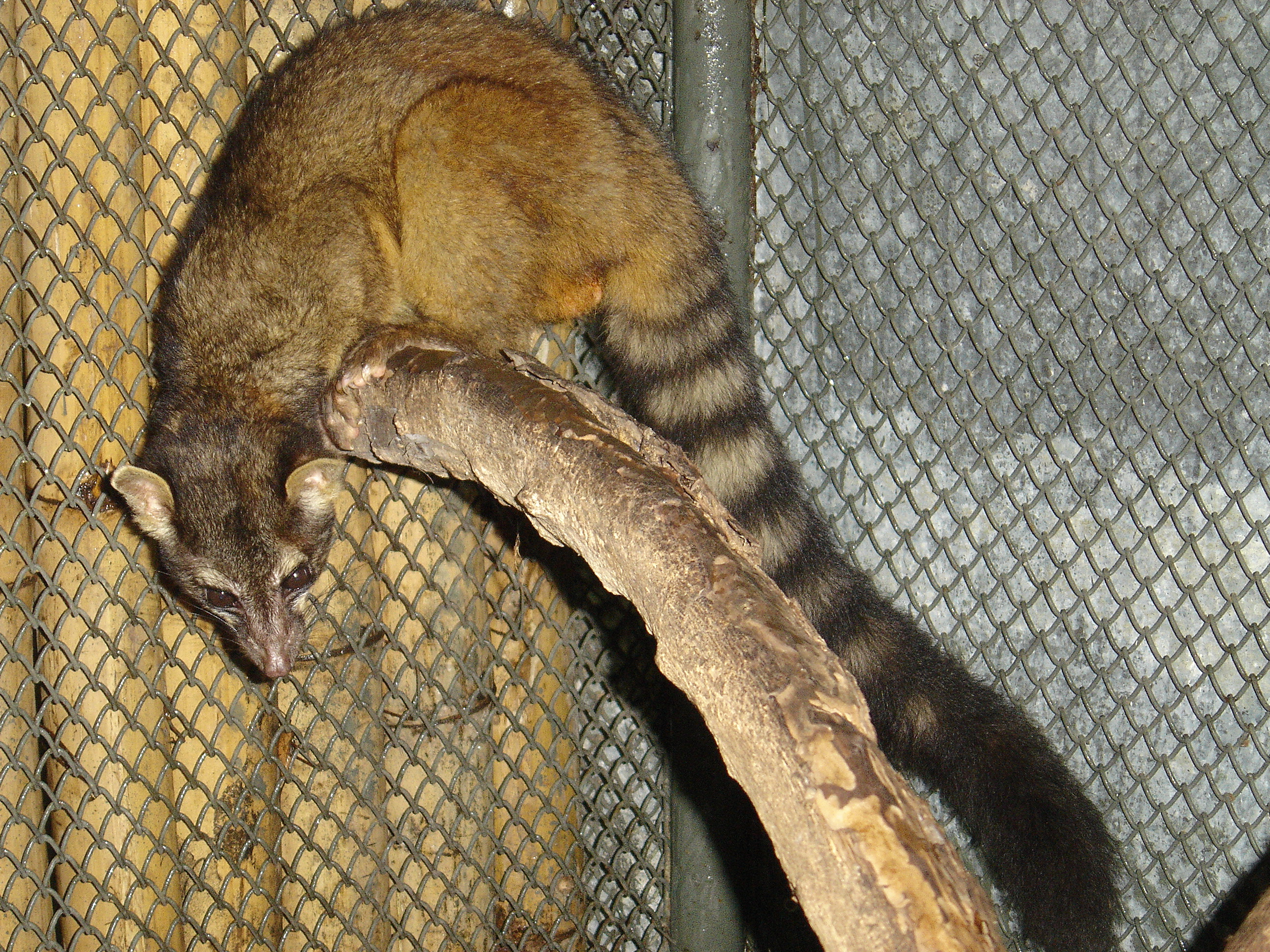

Conservation status
- Least Concern (IUCN 3.1)

Scientific classification
- Kingdom: Animalia
- Phylum: Chordata
- Class: Mammalia
- Infraclass: Placentalia
- Order: Carnivora
- Family: Procyonidae
- Genus: Bassariscus
- Species: B. sumichrasti

Binomial name
- Bassariscus sumichrasti (Saussure, 1860)
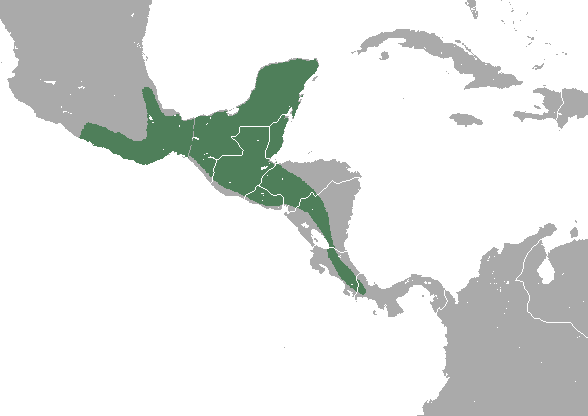
- Cacomistle range

= Cacomistle =

Species of carnivore

The cacomistle (/ˈkækəˌmɪsəl/; Bassariscus sumichrasti), also spelled cacomixtle, is a primarily nocturnal, arboreal, omnivorous member of the carnivoran family Procyonidae (coatis, kinkajous and raccoons). Depending on the location, its preferred habitats are humid and tropical evergreen jungle and montane cloud forests; seasonally, it may venture into drier, deciduous forests.

Although its total population is listed as being of "least concern" (i.e., stable), the cacomistle is still a highly cryptic, secretive animal, and generally an uncommon sight throughout much of its range (from southern México to western Panamá); this fact is especially true in Costa Rica, where it inhabits only a very small area. Additionally, the species is completely dependent on trees and dense vegetation for habitat, making it particularly susceptible to deforestation.

The name cacomistle comes from the Nahuatl language (tlahcomiztli) and means "half-cat" or "half-puma"; the same name is also given, by some, to the North American Bassariscus astutus, more commonly known as the ringtail (or, semi-inaccurately, ringtail 'cat'). This "sister species" of the cacomistle inhabits a much more northerly and less tropical range, from arid Northern Mexico into the Southwestern United States.

== Taxonomy ==
The cacomistle is one of two extant species in the genus Bassariscus, along with its close relative, the North American ringtail (Bassariscus astutus). Together, they form the Procyoninae, a subfamily of the greater Procyonidae of the Carnivora order, thus placing them with raccoons, coatis, olingos and kinkajous.

Currently, six regional subspecies of Bassariscus sumichrasti are recognized:

- Campeche cacomistle (Bassariscus sumichrasti campechensis)
- Central American cacomistle (B. s. sumichrasti)
- Guerrero cacomistle (B. s. latrans)
- Northern Central American cacomistle (B. s. variabilis)
- Oaxaca cacomistle (B. s. oaxacensis)
- Panamá cacomistle (B. s. notinus)

== Description ==
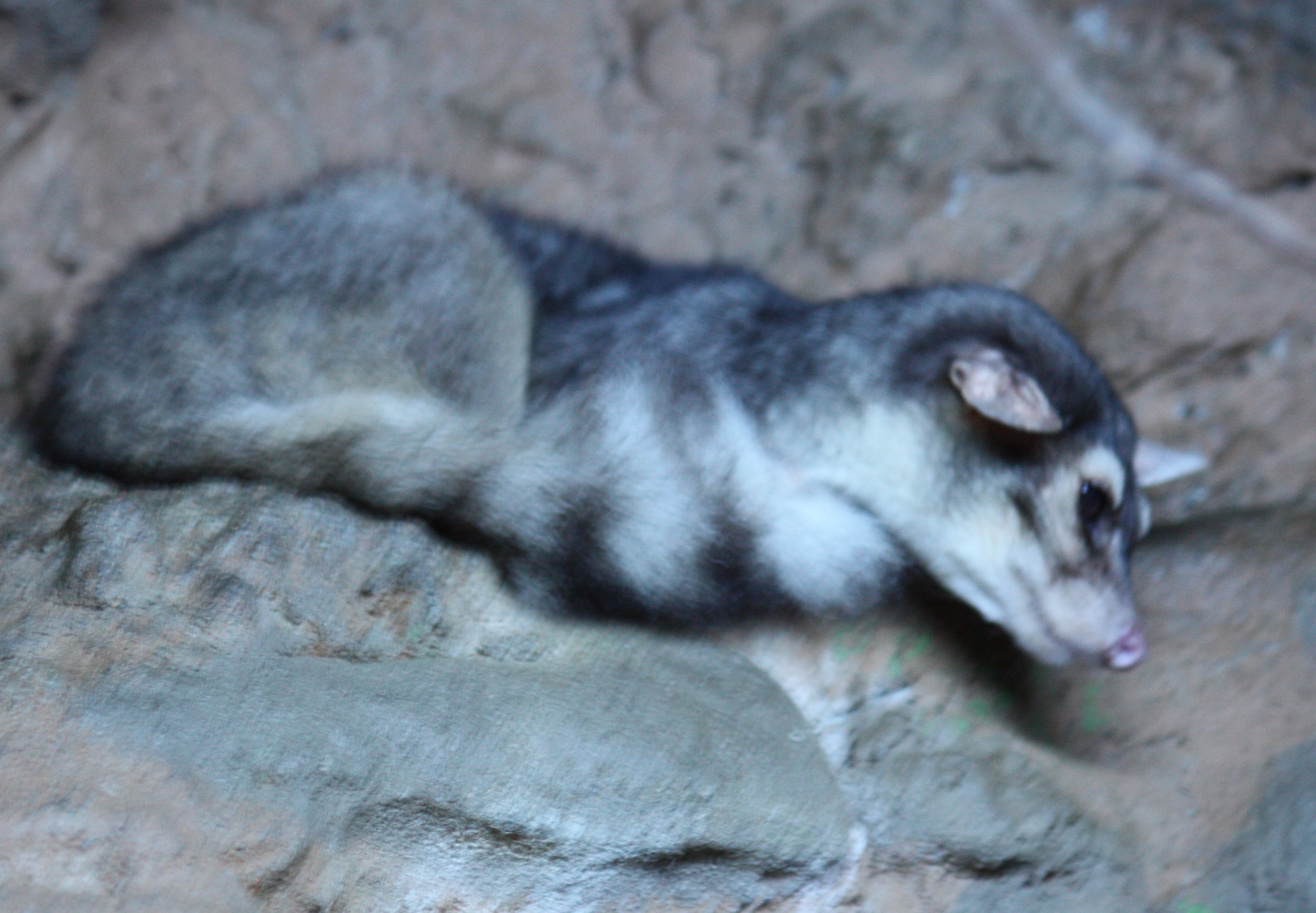
Cacomistle (Bassariscus sumichrasti)

Bassariscus sumichrasti can grow to around 38–47 cm long, followed by a tail of roughly the same length or longer, adding an additional 39–53 cm to the entire animal's body length. The male cacomistle is often slightly longer-bodied than the female; however, both males and females weigh about the same, usually between 1 and 1.5 kg. Their bodies are usually covered in grey or light brownish fur, in stark contrast to the black-and-white, striped tail. The tail markings are most defined near the animal's posterior end, gradually fading to a solid black at the tip of the tail.

To the untrained eye, Bassariscus sumichrasti may be visually confused with its close relative, Bassariscus astutus, the ringtail; however, in addition to a more northerly distribution, the ringtail, unlike the cacomistle, does not have retractable claws. The cacomistle can also be identified by its faded tail markings and ears that end in a distinct point.

== Distribution and habitat ==
The cacomistle inhabits the tropical and subtropical forests of North America (Mexico) and south into Central America, ranging through Panama. These animals are quite solitary and thus spread themselves out, with each cacomistle having a home range of at least 20 hectares (an area equivalent to 20 sports fields) and are typically seen in the middle and upper levels of the canopy. Throughout their broad range this species is found to inhabit a wide variety of different forest ecosystems. In Mexico, the cacomistle tends to avoid oak forests, secondary forest, and overgrown pastures, but in Costa Rica, the cacomistle has been shown to favor those exact habitats.

== Diet ==
The cacomistle is usually considered a generalist species, as it can survive on a wide variety of different foods. Their diet varies from season-to-season, consisting primarily of fruits, flowers, nectar, invertebrates and also some small vertebrates, such as lizards, frogs, toads, and rodents. The specificity of these food options depends on what is available in the particular habitat in which an individual dwells. The various genera of bromeliads (Bromeliaceae family) found throughout the cacomistle's range are often an excellent source for food, especially in the southern end of the species' range, as these plants naturally collect rain water, which in turn brings insects and many small animals found high in the canopy; in addition, the bromeliad itself is often consumed by some omnivorous species.

== Reproduction ==
Mating season is the only time cacomistles interact with each other, and it is only briefly as the female is only receptive to male approaches for one day. After mating, the female cacomistle undergoes a gestation period of approximately two months before giving birth to a single offspring. When the cub is three months old it is weaned, and then taught hunting and survival skills by its mother before going off to develop its own territory.
