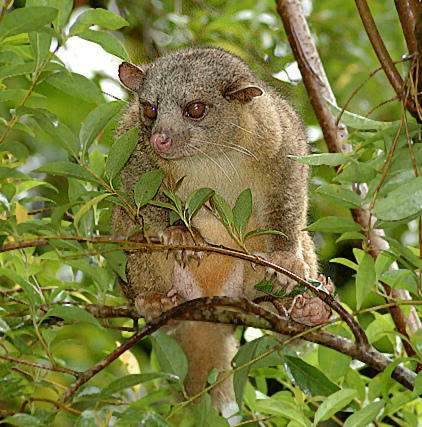
- in Costa Rica

Conservation status
- Least Concern (IUCN 3.1)

Scientific classification
- Kingdom: Animalia
- Phylum: Chordata
- Class: Mammalia
- Order: Carnivora
- Family: Procyonidae
- Genus: Bassaricyon
- Species: B. gabbii

Binomial name
- Bassaricyon gabbii Allen, 1876
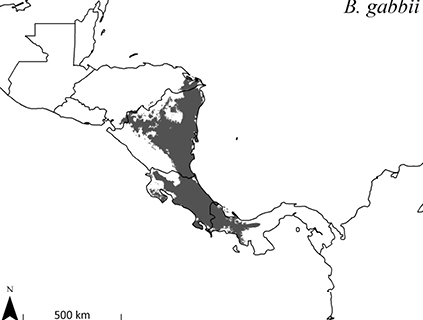
- Northern olingo range

Synonyms
- Bassaricyon richardsoni J. A. Allen, 1908; Bassaricyon lasius Harris, 1932; Bassaricyon pauli Enders, 1936

= Northern olingo =

Species of carnivore

The northern olingo (Bassaricyon gabbii), also known as the bushy-tailed olingo or, simply, the olingo (due to it being the most common of the species), is an arboreal (tree-dwelling) member of the raccoon family, Procyonidae, which also includes the coatimundis and kinkajou. Native to Central America, it was the first species of olingo to be scientifically described; while it is considered by some authors to be the only "true" olingo species, a review of the genus Bassaricyon had shown there to be a total of four species, two of those now being considered synonymous with the northern olingo. Its specific name honors William More Gabb (1839-1878), who found and collected the first specimen for western science.

== Description ==
The northern olingo is a slender arboreal animal, with hind legs distinctly longer than the fore legs, and a long, bushy tail. The face is short and rounded, with relatively large eyes and short round ears. The fur is thick and colored brown or grey-brown over most of the body, becoming slightly darker along the middle of the back, while the underparts are light cream to yellowish. A band of yellowish fur runs around the throat and sides of the head, where it reaches the base of the ears, while the face has greyish fur. The tail is similar in color to the body, but has a number of faint rings of darker fur along its length. The soles of the feet are hairy, and the toes are slightly flattened, ending with short, curved claws. Females have a single pair of teats, located on the rear part of the abdomen, close to the hind legs.

Adults have a head-body length of 36 to 42 centimetres (14 to 17 in), with a 38 to 48 centimetres (15 to 19 in) tail. They weigh around 1.2 to 1.4 kilograms (2.6 to 3.1 lb). The northern olingo possesses a pair of anal scent glands, capable of producing a foul-smelling chemical when the animal is alarmed.

This is the largest of the olingo species. Its pelage is typically less rufous than the other olingos, while its tail bands are a bit more distinct.

== Distribution and habitat ==
The northern olingo is found from Nicaragua south through Panama, as well as Costa Rica. They have been occasionally reported from Honduras and Guatemala, although its great similarity to the more common kinkajou may make such reports dubious. The olingo is not currently recognised by the IUCN. While some individuals have been found as low as sea level, it typically inhabits montane and tropical moist forests from 1,000 metres (3,300 ft) up to around 2,000 metres (6,600 ft) elevation, although, apparently, it avoids human-disturbed areas, plantations and areas of secondary forest.

== Taxonomy ==
Previously, three subspecies (including the nominate) were recognized of this olingo: B. g. gabbii, B. g. richardsoni, and B. g. medius. The recent review of the genus has made several changes to the definition of this species:

1. The Nicaraguan population B. g. richardsoni may truly be a subspecies, but further review and analysis is needed.
2. B. g. medius is smaller on average than Bassaricyon gabbii and the morphologic and genetic analysis demonstrated that is a different species: B. medius (western lowland olingo).
3. Former species B. lasius and B. pauli have been demoted into synonyms for B. gabbii, but may be elevated to subspecies as B. g. lasius and B. g. pauli.

The closest relatives of B. gabbii are the two lowland olingo species of Panama and northwestern South America, B. alleni and B. medius, from which it diverged about 1.8 million years ago.

== Diet and behavior ==
The northern olingo is a nocturnal herbivore, feeding almost entirely on fruit, especially figs. It has been observed to drink the nectar of balsa trees during the dry season, and, on rare occasions, to pursue and eat small mammals, such as mice and squirrels. During the day, it sleeps in dens located in large trees. It has an estimated home range of around 23 hectares (57 acres).

Although it has been considered to be a solitary animal, it is often encountered in pairs, and may be more sociable than commonly believed. It is arboreal, spending much of its time in trees. Its tail is not prehensile, unlike that of the related kinkajous, although it can act as a balance. The call of the northern olingo has been described as possessing two distinct notes, with a "whey-chuck" or "wey-toll" sound.

The northern olingo has a diet and habitat similar to those of kinkajous, and, when resources are in short supply, the larger animal may drive it away from its preferred trees. Predators that may feed on young northern olingo include the jaguarundi, ocelot, tayra, and boas. It is believed to breed during the dry season, and to give birth to a single young after a gestation period of around ten weeks. It has lived for up to twenty-five years in captivity.
