= Jesús E. Maldonado =

American geneticist

Jesús E. Maldonado is an American research geneticist from the Center for Conservation and Evolutionary Genetics at the Smithsonian Institution.

== Career ==
Maldonado graduated to Bachelor of Science at the Shippensburg University of Pennsylvania in 1983 and to Master of Science at the same university in 1985. In 2001, he promoted to Ph.D. in Organismic Biology, Ecology and Evolution at the University of California Los Angeles. In 1998, he joined the Smithsonian Institution where he worked at the Genetics Program for the National Zoological Park and the National Museum of Natural History in Washington, DC. His main research field is the evolutionary genetics of mammals. In 1996, he began his long-term study of kit foxes where he used mitochondrial DNA sequence data to compare the phylogenetic relationships of the endangered Mexican kit fox with North American arid land foxes. In 2002, he described the two subspecies Ozotoceros bezoarticus arerunguaensis and Ozotoceros bezoarticus uruguayensis of the Pampas deer. In addition he did genetic research work on rare or endangered mammals. In 2013, he was among the team who scientifically described the olinguito.
