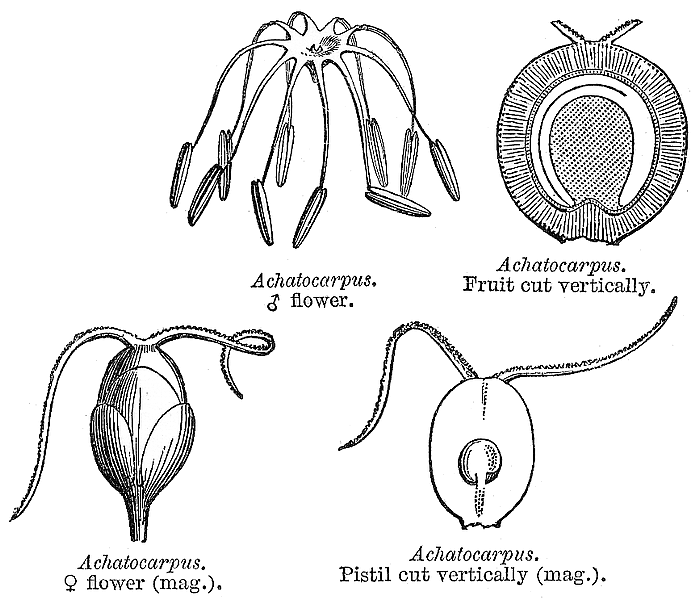
- Achatocarpus spp.

Scientific classification
- Kingdom: Plantae
- Clade: Tracheophytes
- Clade: Angiosperms
- Clade: Eudicots
- Order: Caryophyllales
- Family: Achatocarpaceae; Heimerl

Genera
- Achatocarpus Triana; Phaulothamnus A.Gray

= Achatocarpaceae =

Family of plants

The Achatocarpaceae are a family of woody flowering plants consisting of two genera and 11 known species, and has been recognized by most taxonomists. The family is found from the southwestern United States south to tropical and subtropical South America.

The APG II system (2003; unchanged from the APG system of 1998) assigns it to the order Caryophyllales in the clade core eudicots. It forms a clade together with Amaranthaceae and Caryophyllaceae, two very large families.

== Genera ==
There are two genera, both of which are dioecious:

- Achatocarpus Triana
- Phaulothamnus A.Gray
