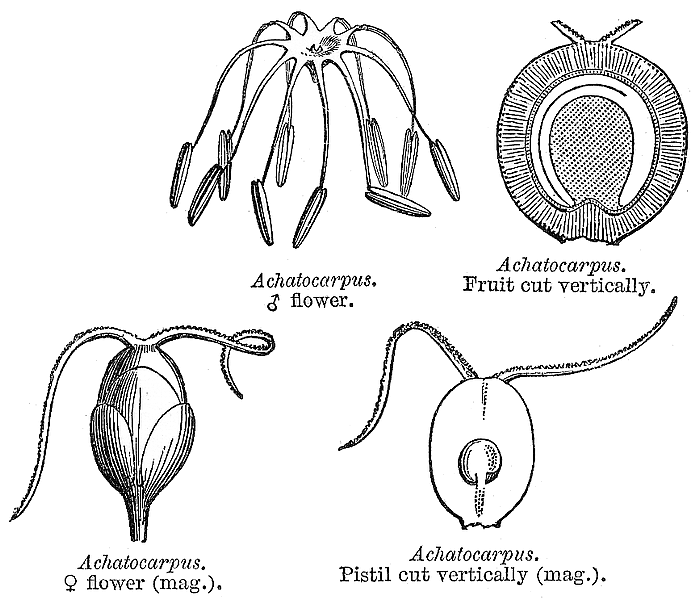

Scientific classification
- Kingdom: Plantae
- Clade: Tracheophytes
- Clade: Angiosperms
- Clade: Eudicots
- Order: Caryophyllales
- Family: Achatocarpaceae
- Genus: Achatocarpus; Triana

Species
- See text

= Achatocarpus =

Genus of plants

Achatocarpus is a genus of trees and shrubs belonging to the family Achatocarpaceae. It is distributed throughout tropical South America, predominantly in Argentina. 15 species have been described, but only 9 accepted.

== Taxonomy ==
The genus was described by José Jerónimo Triana and published in Annales des Sciences Naturelles; Botanique, série 4 9: 45. 1858. The type species is: Achatocarpus nigricans Triana

== Species ==
Below is a listing of the species of the genus Achatocarpus accepted until January 2017, in alphabetical order. For each indicated the binomial name followed by author.

- Achatocarpus balansae Schinz & Autran
- Achatocarpus brevipedicellatus H.Walter
- Achatocarpus gracilis H.Walter
- Achatocarpus hasslerianus Heimerl
- Achatocarpus microcarpus Schinz & Autran
- Achatocarpus nigricans Triana
- Achatocarpus oaxacanus Standl.
- Achatocarpus praecox Griseb.
- Achatocarpus pubescens C.H.Wright

Synonyms:

- Achatocarpus brasiliensis H.Walter = Achatocarpus praecox var. praecox.
