= Honey bear =

Honey bear may refer to:

== Animals ==
- American black bear, famous for honey being part of its diet
- Sun bear of Southeast Asia, which has light-colored upper-chest fur
- Sloth bear of Indian subcontinent, also with light-colored upper-chest fur
- Kinkajou, a rainforest mammal native to Central and South America

== Nicknames of people ==
- Nina Warren, known as "Honey Bear", daughter of Earl Warren and mother of Dr. William Brien
- Nickname of Nick Markakis (born 1983), right fielder for the Baltimore Orioles known for prowling right field and raking
- Nickname of Gene Sedric (1907–1963), American saxophonist

== Others ==
- The Chicago Honey Bears, a cheerleading squad
- A commercially sold bear-shaped container of honey
- Banjo, a honey bear.

== See also ==
- Curly Bear (Sesame Street), a character sometimes incorrectly referred to as Honey Bear
- Honey Bear, a character in Berenstain Bears
