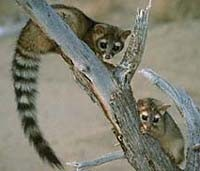

Scientific classification
- Kingdom: Animalia
- Phylum: Chordata
- Class: Mammalia
- Order: Carnivora
- Family: Procyonidae
- Subfamily: Procyoninae
- Tribe: Bassariscini
- Genus: Bassariscus; Coues, 1887

Type species
- Bassaris astuta (Lichtenstein 1830)

Species
- Bassariscus astutus †Bassariscus casei †Bassariscus sonoitensis Bassariscus sumichrasti
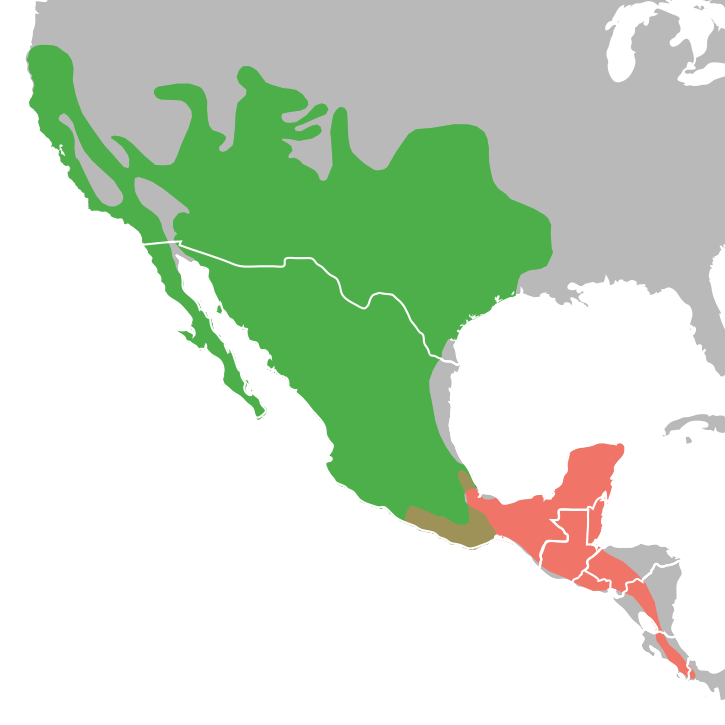
- Bassariscus distribution B. astutus in green, B. sumichrasti in red

= Bassariscus =

Genus of carnivores

Bassariscus is a genus in the family Procyonidae. There are two extant species in the genus: the ringtail or ring-tailed cat (B. astutus) and the cacomistle (B. sumichrasti). Genetic studies have indicated that the closest relatives of Bassariscus are raccoons, from which they diverged about 10 million years ago in the Tortonian Age of the Miocene. The two lineages of Bassariscus are thought to have separated after only another two million years, making it the extant procyonid genus with the earliest diversification. Later diversification in the genus in the Pliocene and Pleistocene saw the emergence of two extinct species, Bassariscus casei and Bassariscus sonoitensis, respectively. Due to the more digitigrade stance of their legs compared to the plantigrade stance of other members of Procyonidae, some taxonomies place the genus as a separate family, Bassaricidae.. The name is a Greek word for fox ("bassaris") with a Latinized diminutive ending ("-iscus"). The genus was named by Elliott Coues in 1887, having previously been described by Lichtenstein in 1830 under the name Bassaris. Coues proposed the word "bassarisk" as the English term for animals in this genus. Its habitat includes semi-arid areas in the southwestern United States, the whole of Mexico, as well as moist tropical forests in Central America.

== Species ==
Image	Scientific name	Common name	Distribution
	Bassariscus astutus	Ringtail	Southern United States from southern Oregon and California throughout the southwestern states to Texas. In Mexico it ranges from the northern desert state of Baja California to Oaxaca. Its distribution overlaps that of B. sumichrasti in the Mexican states of Guerrero, Oaxaca and Veracruz.
	† Bassariscus casei	Case's ringtail	An extinct species with fossils first found in the Upper Pliocene strata of the Rexroad formation in Kansas and later in the Late Blancan strata in California.
	† Bassariscus sonoitensis		An extinct species with only three known locations in Papago Springs Cave, Santa Cruz County, Arizona (1942), San Josecito Cave, Nuevo León, Mexico (1958), and U-Bar Cave, Hidalgo County, New Mexico (1987), that lived from the late Pleistocene and went extinct before the full-glacial period of the late Wisconsinian.
	Bassariscus sumichrasti	Cacomistle	Central America, from south central Mexico to Panama.
