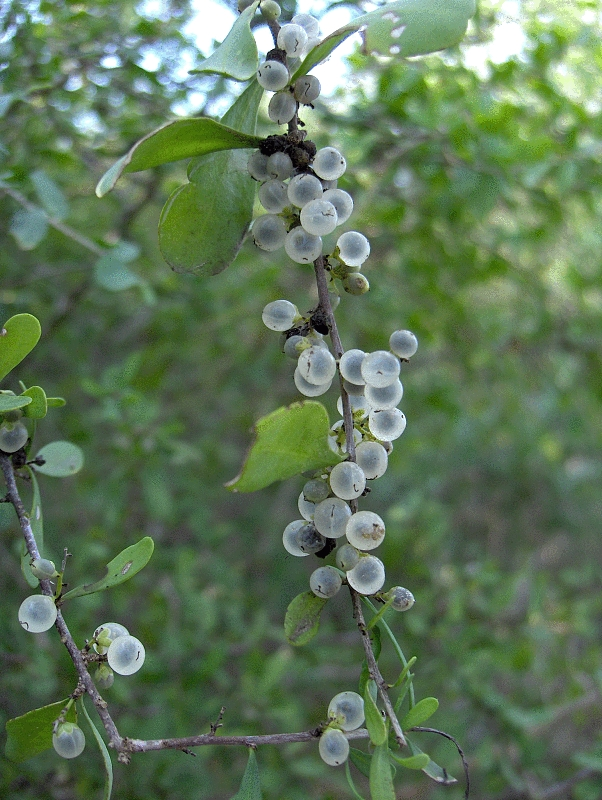
- Phaulothamnus spinescens

Scientific classification
- Kingdom: Plantae
- Clade: Tracheophytes
- Clade: Angiosperms
- Clade: Eudicots
- Order: Caryophyllales
- Family: Achatocarpaceae
- Genus: Phaulothamnus; A.Gray
- Species: P. spinescens

Binomial name
- Phaulothamnus spinescens A.Gray

= Phaulothamnus =

Genus of flowering plants

Phaulothamnus is a genus of plants formerly included in the family Phytolaccaceae but now considered a part of the Achatocarpaceae.

Only one species is recognized: Phaulothamnus spinescens A. Gray, native to southern Texas, northeastern Mexico (eastern Coahuila, Nuevo León, and Tamaulipas), and northwestern Mexico (Sonora, Sinaloa, Baja California, Baja California Sur and the Islas Marías of Nayarit). This is a branching shrub with juicy berries. Common names include snake-eyes, devilqueen, or putia.

Phaulothamnus spinescens is a branching shrub up to 250 cm tall, with spines along the branches. Leaves are broader than wide, up to 35 mm wide but rarely more than 12 mm long. Flowers are borne one at a time or in racemes. Fruits are spherical, juicy, white to greenish with the black seeds visible through the thin fruit wall.
