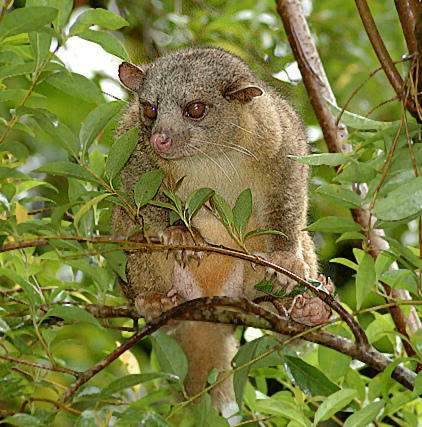
- Northern olingo (Bassaricyon gabbii)

Scientific classification
- Kingdom: Animalia
- Phylum: Chordata
- Class: Mammalia
- Order: Carnivora
- Family: Procyonidae
- Subfamily: Potosinae
- Genus: Bassaricyon; Allen, 1876

Type species
- Bassaricyon gabbii

Species
- Bassaricyon alleni; Bassaricyon gabbii; Bassaricyon medius; Bassaricyon neblina
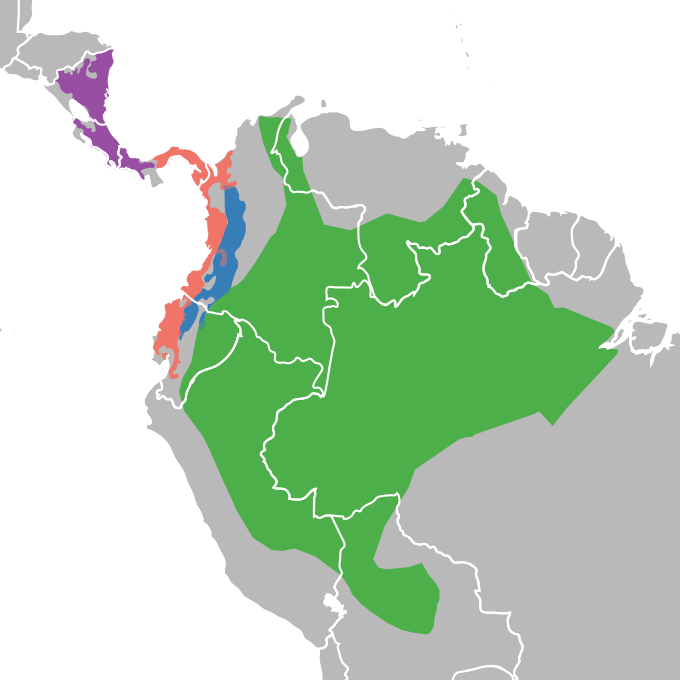
- Bassaricyon distribution B. gabbii in purple, B. medius in red, B. neblina in blue, B. alleni in green

= Bassaricyon =

Genus of carnivores

The genus Bassaricyon consists of small Neotropical procyonids, popularly known as olingos (/ɒˈlɪŋɡoʊz/), relatives of the raccoon. They are native to the rainforests of Central and South America from Nicaragua to Peru. They are arboreal and nocturnal, and live at elevations from sea level to 2,750 m (9,020 ft). Olingos closely resemble another procyonid, the kinkajou, in morphology and habits; though they lack prehensile tails and extrudable tongues, have more extended muzzles, and possess anal scent glands. However, the two genera are not sisters. They also resemble galagos and certain lemurs.

== Species ==
There is disagreement on the number of species in this genus, with some taxonomists splitting the populations into as many as five species (adding B. pauli to the list below), two species (dropping B. medius and B. neblina), or just a single species (B. gabbii). Until recently, only the northern olingo (B. gabbii) was particularly well-known, and it was usually confusingly referred to simply as an olingo. Olingos are quite rare in zoos and are often misidentified as kinkajous.

A previously unrecognized olingo, similar to but distinct from B. alleni, was discovered in 2006 by Kristofer Helgen at Las Maquinas in the Andes of Ecuador. He named this species B. neblina or olinguito and presented his findings on August 15, 2013.

With data derived from anatomy, morphometrics, nuclear and mitochondrial DNA, field observations, and geographic range modeling, Helgen and coworkers demonstrated that four olingo species can be recognized:

Genus Bassaricyon – Allen, 1876 – four species
Common name	Scientific name and subspecies	Range	Size and ecology	IUCN status and estimated population
Eastern lowland olingo	Bassaricyon alleni Thomas, 1880	Lowlands of Guyana, Venezuela, and in Colombia, Ecuador, Peru and Bolivia east of the Andes	Size: Habitat: Diet:	LC
Northern olingo	Bassaricyon gabbii Allen, 1876 Three subspecies: B. g. gabbii; B. g. richardsoni; B. g. medius	Central American, lowlands and highlands of Nicaragua, Costa Rica, and western Panama	Size: Habitat: Diet:	LC
Western lowland olingo	Bassaricyon medius Thomas, 1909	Lowlands of Panama and in Colombia and Ecuador west of the Andes	Size: Habitat: Diet:	LC
Olinguito	Bassaricyon neblina Helgen, Pinto, Kays, Helgen, Tsuchiya, Quinn, Wilson & Maldonado,, 2013	A montane species endemic to cloud forests in the Andes of Colombia and Ecuador	Size: Habitat: Diet:	NT

== Evolution ==
Genetic studies have shown that the closest relatives of the olingos are actually the coatis; the divergence between the two groups is estimated to have occurred about 10.2 million years (Ma) ago during the Tortonian age, while kinkajous split off from the other extant procyonids about 22.6 Ma ago during the Aquitanian age. The similarities between kinkajous and olingos are thus an example of parallel evolution.

The diversification of the genus apparently started about 3.5 million years ago, when B. neblina branched off from the others; B. gabbii then split off about 1.8 Ma ago, and the two lowland species, B. alleni and B. medius, diverged about 1.3 Ma ago. The dating and biogeography modeling suggest that the earliest diversification of the genus took place in northwestern South America shortly after the ancestors of olingos first invaded the continent from Central America as part of the Great American Interchange. The evolution of olingos thus contrasts with that of kinkajous, a much older lineage that is thought to have arisen in Central America long before they reached South America.

- Bassaricyon
  - - - B. alleni (eastern lowland olingo)
      - B. medius (western lowland olingo)
    - - B. gabbi (northern olingo)
  - B. neblina (olinguito)
