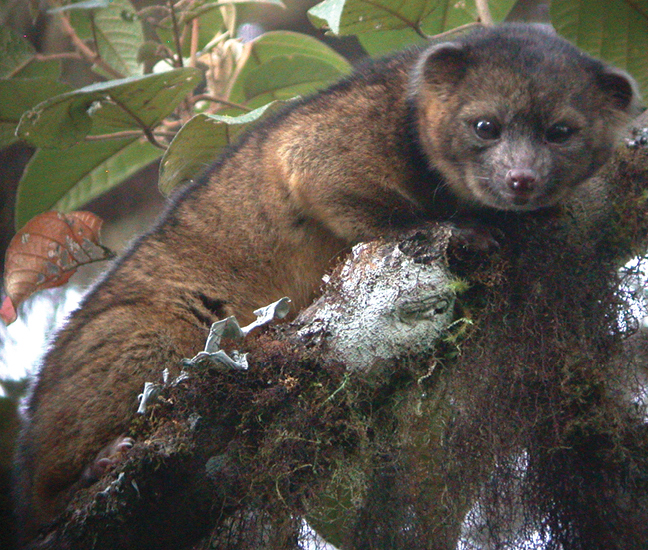

Conservation status
- Near Threatened (IUCN 3.1)

Scientific classification
- Kingdom: Animalia
- Phylum: Chordata
- Class: Mammalia
- Order: Carnivora
- Family: Procyonidae
- Genus: Bassaricyon
- Species: B. neblina

Binomial name
- Bassaricyon neblina K. M. Helgen, Pinto, Kays, L. Helgen, Tsuchiya, Quinn, Wilson & Maldonado, 2013
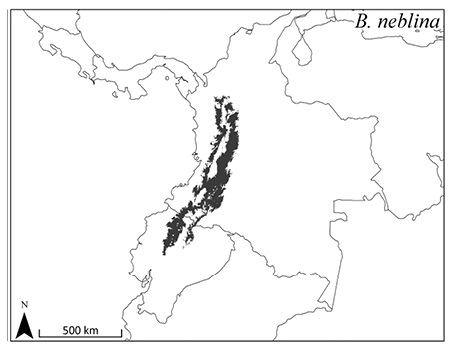

= Olinguito =

Species of carnivores

The olinguito /oʊlɪŋˈɡiːtoʊ/ (Bassaricyon neblina) is a mammal of the raccoon family Procyonidae that lives in montane forests in the Andes of western Colombia and Ecuador. It was classified as belonging to a new species in 2013. The specific name neblina is Spanish for fog or mist, referring to the cloud forest habitat of the olinguito.

On 22 May 2014, the International Institute for Species Exploration declared the olinguito as one of the "Top 10 New Species of 2014" among species discovered in 2013. It is the first new carnivoran mammal described in the Western Hemisphere in 35 years.

== Description ==
The olinguito is distinct from the other species within the genus, popularly known as "olingos", and also from the kinkajou (kinkajous resemble olingos, but are not closely related). Its average weight is 900 grams (2 lb), making it the smallest procyonid. The animal is an omnivorous frugivore that eats mainly fruits (such as figs), but also insects and nectar; this diet results in feces the size of small blueberries. The olinguito is thought to be solitary, nocturnal and moderately reclusive. Olinguitos appear to be strictly arboreal. They have a single pair of mammae, and probably produce a single offspring at a time.

== Distribution and habitat ==
Specimens of the species have been identified from the Andean cloud forest stretching from western Colombia to Ecuador, at elevations of 1,500 to 3,000 metres (4,900 to 9,800 ft), which is the highest known range of any member of the genus Bassaricyon. Its discovery was confirmed in the wild and announced on 15 August 2013. The species is not considered to be immediately at risk, but it is estimated that over 40 percent of the animal's potential range has been deforested.

== Discovery ==
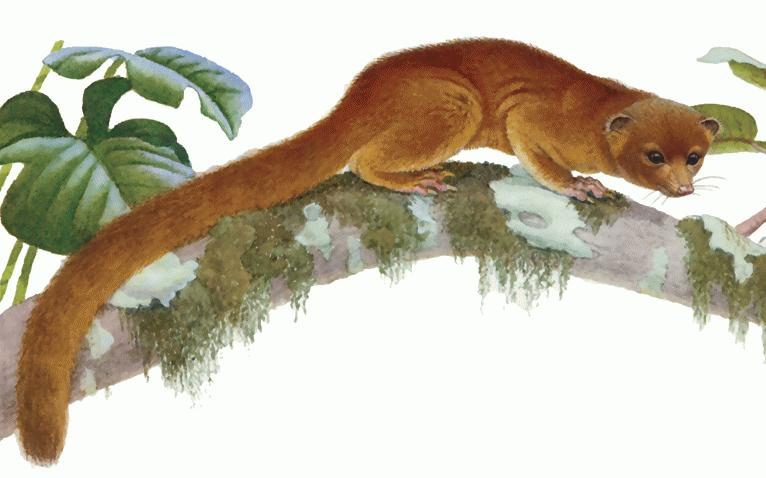
Bassaricyon neblina, illustrated by Nancy Halliday, 2013

Its discovery was announced on 15 August 2013 by Kristofer Helgen, curator of mammals at the Smithsonian National Museum of Natural History, Ecuadorian biologist Miguel Pinto, olingo expert Roland Kays of the North Carolina Museum of Natural Sciences and collaborators. Helgen discovered specimens of the species in storage at The Field Museum in Chicago and used DNA testing to confirm a new species. In 1923 a small pool of olinguitos were collected by researchers in Ecuador. However, they were misidentified by the researchers who mistook them for their relative, the kinkajou as the distinct species share common characteristics.

The researchers who identified the species were unable to discover any local names specific to it.

The discovery was the first identification of a new mammal species of the order Carnivora (Note: The olinguito is omnivorous: not all carnivoran species are carnivores. (Further explanation may be found in the linked articles, including carnivoran diet specializations.)) in the Americas in 35 years. Olinguitos were regularly seen and even publicly exhibited decades before they were recognized as members of a new species. The animal had previously been confused with its taxonomic cousins, the olingos. One such example was Ringerl, an olinguito who lived in the National Zoo in Washington, D.C., for a year and also toured many other zoos. Researchers unsuccessfully tried to breed her with olingos, not realizing she was a different species. Ringerl died in 1976 at the Bronx Zoo.

== Taxonomic evaluation ==
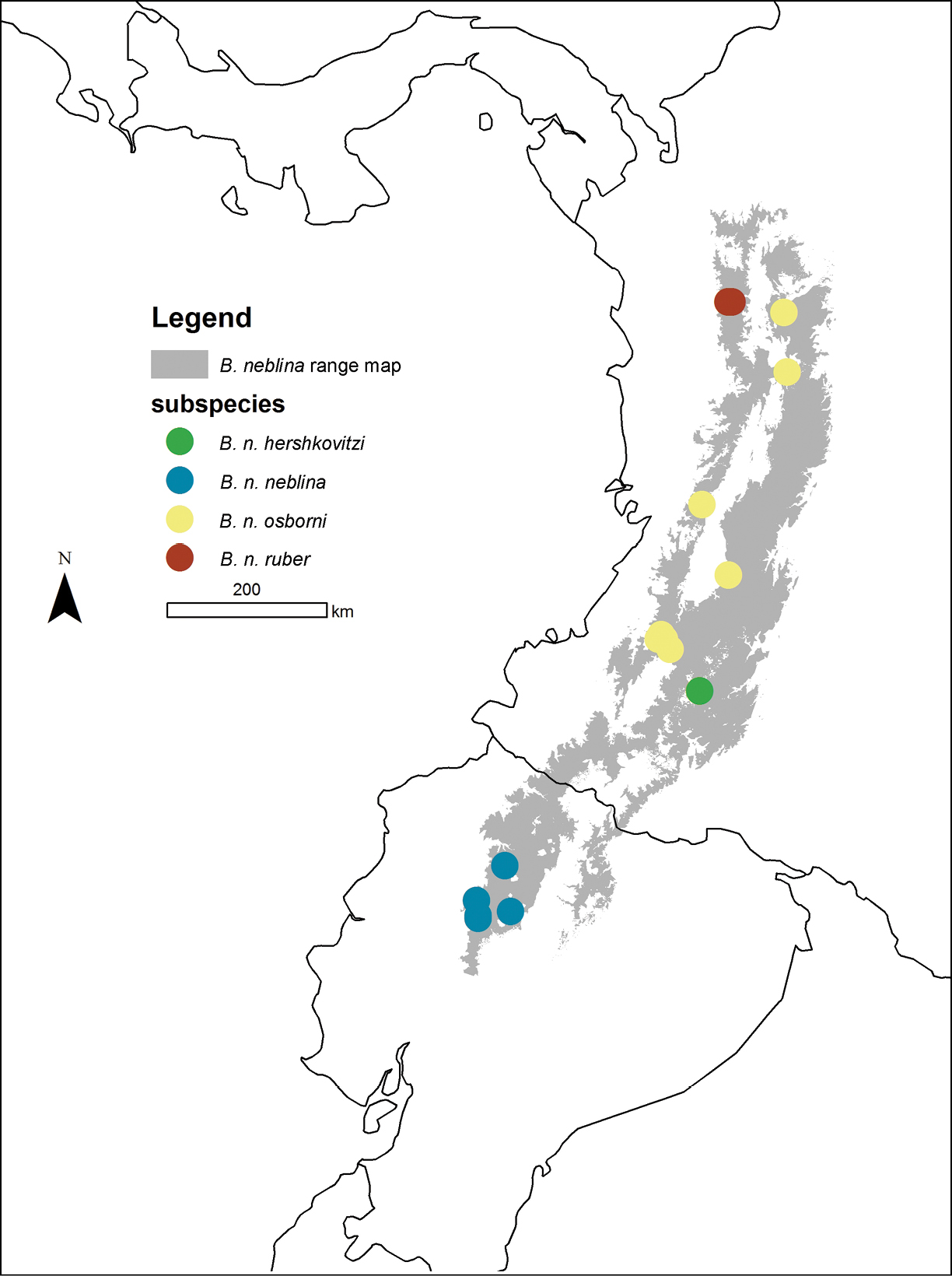
Distribution of sampled Bassaricyon neblina subspecies

The olinguito is smaller than the other species in the genus Bassaricyon. Its body (head to rump) is approximately 355 mm (14.0 in) long, and its tail 335–424 mm (13.2–16.7 in) long. It is also much furrier and has a shorter tail and smaller ears than others that share its genus. The olinguito is found in the northern Andes at altitudes between 1,500 and 2,750 metres (4,920 and 9,020 ft) above sea level, which is much higher than the habitats for other olingos.

Based on morphological distinctions, four olinguito subspecies have been described: the nominate Bassaricyon neblina neblina, and B. n. osborni, B. n. hershkovitzi, and B. n. ruber. Each of these subspecies, though, were found to have a dental formula characteristic of other members of the family Procyonidae.

Dentition
3.1.4.2
3.1.4.2

Comparison of DNA from two olinguito subspecies to other olingo and related species was carried out on the basis of genetic dissimilarity derived from Kimura modeling of differences in base-pair composition of mitochondrial cytochrome b. The genetic divergence between olinguitos and other olingos makes olinguitos a basal sister lineage to the rest of the genus, and is equivalent to differences between species which have been assigned to separate subgenera or genera. This split apparently occurred about 3.5 million years ago, suggesting that the earliest diversification of the genus took place in northwestern South America shortly after the ancestors of olingos first invaded the continent from Central America as part of the Great American Interchange.

== Conservation ==
The olinguito may be at risk due to deforestation and urbanization. ("The researchers reporting its discovery estimated that 42% of suitable historic olinguito habitat had already been converted to agriculture or urban areas and an additional 21% remained in natural but largely unforested conditions…") Since the natural habitat of the olinguito is at higher elevations, its "cloud forest habitat" would need to be protected to optimize the species's probability of survival. As of now, no strict efforts are known to be in place in order to reduce habitat destruction.
