= 1996 in paleontology =

Paleontology or palaeontology is the study of prehistoric life forms on Earth through the examination of plant and animal fossils. This includes the study of body fossils, tracks (ichnites), burrows, cast-off parts, fossilised feces (coprolites), palynomorphs and chemical residues. Because humans have encountered fossils for millennia, paleontology has a long history both before and after becoming formalized as a science. This article records significant discoveries and events related to paleontology that occurred or were published in the year 1996.

== Plants ==
=== Angiosperms ===
Name	Novelty	Status	Authors	Age	Type locality	Location	Notes	Images
Palaeocarpinus aspinosa	Sp nov	Valid	Manchester & Chen	Paleocene; Middle Paleocene	Fort Union Formation	USA; Wyoming	A betulaceous fruit	
Palaeocarpinus orientalis	Sp nov	Valid	Manchester & Guo	Paleocene	Wulungu Depression	China	A betulaceous fruit	

== Arthropods ==
=== Newly named crustaceans ===
Name	Status	Authors	Age	Unit	Location	Notes	Images
Cancer (Metacarcinus) starri	Valid	Berglund & Goedert	Early Miocene	Clallam & Pysht Formations	USA (Washington)	A crab	

=== Newly named insects ===
Name	Novelty	Status	Authors	Age	Unit	Location	Notes	Images
Allopetalia europaea	Sp nov	Jr synonym	Nel, Arillo, & Martínez-Delclòs	Messinian		France	An Aeshnid dragonfly. Moved to Boyeria europaea in 1997	Boyeria europaea
Burmomyrma rossi	Gen et sp. nov	Valid	Dlussky	Late Aptian to Early Cenomanian	Burmese amber	Myanmar	A possible Aneuretin ant	Burmomyrma rossi
Cerdanyagrion	Gen et sp nov	valid	Nel, Arillo, & Martínez-Delclòs	Vallesian/Turolian		Spain	A Megapodagrionid damselfly	Cerdanyagrion miocenicus
Haidomyrmex cerberus	Gen et sp. nov	Valid	Dlussky	Late Aptian to Early Cenomanian	Burmese amber	Myanmar	A Sphecomyrmin ant	Haidomyrmex cerberus
Somatochlora brisaci	Sp nov	Valid	Nel, Arillo, & Martínez-Delclòs	Turolian	Montagne d'Andance	France	A Corduliid dragonfly	Somatochlora brisaci
Sympetrum cantalensis	Sp nov	Valid	Nel, Arillo, & Martínez-Delclòs	Messinian		France	A Libellulid dragonfly	Sympetrum cantalensis
Vulcagrion	Gen et comb et 2 sp nov	valid	Nel, Arillo, & Martínez-Delclòs	Messinian		France	A Megapodagrionid damselfly, three species	Vulcagrion andancensis

== Fish ==
=== Cartilaginous fish ===
==== Research ====
- Duffin et al (1996) describes chondrichthyan remains from the Itaituba Formation of the Amazon Basin of Brazil and deems Anachronistes to be a junior synonym of Cooleyella.

==== New taxa ====
Name	Novelty	Status	Authors	Age	Unit	Location	Notes	Images
Bransonella lingulata	Sp nov	Valid	Ivanov & Ginter	Early Carboniferous (Serpukhovian)	Kalinovskie Vyselki Quarry	Russia	A xenacanth	
Cooleyella amazonensis	Sp nov	Valid	Duffin et al.	Late Carboniferous	Itaituba Formation	Brazil	A anachronistid	

== Amphibians ==
=== Temnospondyls ===
Name	Novelty	Status	Authors	Age	Unit	Location	Notes	Images
Tatrasuchus	Gen et sp nov	Valid	Maryańska & Shishkin	Middle Triassic		Poland	A cyclotosaurid	

== Plesiosaurs ==
=== New taxa ===
Name	Status	Authors	Location	Notes	Images
Pachycostasaurus	Valid	Cruickshank Martill	UK		
Plesiopleurodon	Valid	Carpenter	USA (Wyoming)	The Last of the Pliosaurs.	Plesiopleurodon
Thalassiodracon	Valid	Storrs Taylor	UK		Thalassiodracon

== Dinosaurs ==
- In the summer excavation resumed on the Talkeetna Mountains Hadrosaur, discovered in a quarry near the Glenn Highway, approximately 150 miles northeast of Anchorage.

=== Newly named dinosaurs ===
Data courtesy of George Olshevsky's dinosaur genera list.

Name	Status	Authors		Location	Notes	Images
"Angaturama'"	Junior synonym of Irritator	Kellner	Campos			
Bagaraatan	Valid taxon	Halszka Osmólska		Mongolia		
Deltadromeus	Valid taxon	Paul Sereno; Duthiel; Iarochene; Larsson	Lyon; Magwene; Sidor; Varricchio; Jeffrey A. Wilson.	Egypt Morocco		Deltadromeus
Gasparinisaura	Valid taxon	Rodolfo Coria	Salgado	Argentina		Gasparinisaura
Irritator	Valid taxon	Martill; Cruickshank; Frey	Small; M. Clarke	Brazil		Irritator
Ligabueino	Valid taxon	Jose Bonaparte		Argentina		
"Jensenosaurus"	Junior synonym of Supersaurus	George Olshevsky vide: B. D. Curtice; Stadtman	L. J. Curtice,			Supersaurus
"Luanpingosaurus"	Junior synonym of Psittacosaurus	Cheng Zhengwu vide: Chen P.; Cheng Zhengwu	et al.			
"Magulodon"	Nomen nudum	Kranz; Cheng Zhengwu	et al.			
Neovenator	Valid taxon	Hutt; Martill	Barker	UK		Neovenator
Parvicursor	Valid taxon	Karhu	Rautian	Mongolia		
Patagonykus	Valid taxon	Novas		Argentina		Patagonykus
Pawpawsaurus	Valid taxon	Lee		USA (Texas)		
Pellegrinisaurus	Valid taxon	Salgado		Argentina		
Qinlingosaurus	Valid taxon	Xue; Zhang Y. X.; Bi	Yue; Chen D.	China		
Rayososaurus	Valid taxon	Jose Bonaparte		Argentina		
Shanyangosaurus	Valid taxon	Xue; Zhang Y. X.; Bi	Yue; Chen D.	China		
Siamotyrannus	Valid taxon	Buffetaut; Suteethorn	Tong	Thailand		
Sigilmassasaurus	Valid taxon	Dale A. Russell		Morocco		
Sinosauropteryx	Valid taxon	Ji Q.	Ji S.	China		Sinosauropteryx

== Birds ==
=== Newly named birds ===
Name	Novelt	Status	Authors	Age	Unit	Location	Notes	Images
Anas ganii	Sp. nov.	Valid	Nikolay I. Burchak-Abramovich K. L. Sushpanov A. L. David	Late Early Pleistocene		Moldova	An Anatidae.	
Anas marecula	Sp. nov.	Valid	Storrs L. Olson Pierre Jouventin	Holocene	Amsterdam Island	French Southern and Antarctic Lands	An Anatidae.	
Anhinga fraileyi	Sp. nov.	Valid	Kenneth E. Campbell, jr.	Late Miocene	Huayquerian	Peru	An Anhingidae.	
"Branta" minor	Valid	Eugen Kessler Erika Gal	Late Miocene	MN 9		Moldova	An Aves Incertae Sedis, it is not an Anatidae.	
Copepteryx hexeris	Gen. nov. et Sp. nov.	Valid	Storrs L. Olson Yoshikazu Hasegawa	Late Oligocene	Ainoshima Formation	Japan	A Pelecaniformes, Plotopteridae Howard, 1969, this is the type species of the new genus.	
Copepteryx titan	Gen. nov. et Sp. nov.	Valid	Storrs L. Olson Yoshikazu Hasegawa	Late Oligocene	Ainoshima Formation	Japan	A Pelecaniformes, Plotopteridae Howard, 1969.	
Eoalulavis hoyasi	Gen. nov. et Sp. nov.	Valid	José L. Sanz Luis M. Chiappe Bernardo P. Pérez-Moreno Angela D. Buscaliono José J. Moratalla Francisco Ortega Francisco J. Poyato-Ariza	Early Cretaceous	Neocomian	Spain: Castilla-La Mancha	An Ornithothoraces Chiappe & Calvo, 1994, Enantiornithes. Walker, 1981, this is the type species of the new genus.	
Nanantius valifanovi	Sp. nov.	Valid	Evgeny N. Kurochkin	Late Cretaceous	Late Campanian	Mongolia	An Enantiornithes Walker, 1981, Alexornithidae Brodkorb, 1976, Gobipteryginae Elzanowski, 1974.	
Nandayus vorohuensis	Sp. nov.	Valid	Eduardo P. Tonni Jorge Noriega	Late Pliocene	Orohué Formation	Argentina	A Psittacidae.	
Otis bessarabicus	Sp. nov.	Valid	Eugen Kessler Erika Gal	Late Miocene	MN 9	Moldova	An Otididae.	
Struthio coppensi	Sp. nov.	Valid	Cécile Mourer-Chauviré Brigitte Senut Martin Pickford Pierre Mein	Early Miocene	Karingarab	Namibia	A Struthionidae.	
?Tringa grigorescui	Sp. nov.	Valid	Eugen Kessler Erika Gal	Middle Miocene	MN 8	Romania	A Scolopacidae, not sure it is a Tringa.	
Vorona berivotrensis	Gen. nov. et Sp. nov.	Valid	Catharine A. Forster Luis M. Chiappe David W. Krause Scott D. Sampson	Late Cretaceous	Campanian, Maevarano Formation	Madagascar	An Ornithothoraces Chiappe et Calvo, 1994 .	

== Pterosaurs ==
=== New taxa ===
Name	Status	Authors	Location	Notes
Kepodactylus	Valid	Harris, J.D. Carpenter	USA (Colorado)	

== Fossil eggs ==
=== New ootaxa ===
Name	Status	Authors	Location	Notes
Dispersituberoolithus	Valid	Zelenitsky et al.	Canada (Alberta)	Probably laid by a primitive neognath.
Gobioolithus	Valid	Mikhailov		Formerly called "Gobipteryx eggs", though they are not presently considered to be eggs of Gobipteryx.

== Synapsids ==
=== Mammals ===
==== New taxa ====
Name	Novelty	Status	Authors	Age	Type locality	Country	Notes	Images
Leptacodon nascimentoi	Sp nov	Valid	Estravís	Early Eocene	Silveirinha Formation	Portugal	A nyctitheriid	
Stenoplesictis indigenus	Sp. nov	Jr synonym	Dashzeveg	Late Eocene	Ergilin Dzo Formation	Mongolia	Moved to the genus Alagtsavbaatar in 2016	
Stenoplesictis simplex	Sp. nov	Jr synonym	Dashzeveg	Late Eocene	Ergilin Dzo Formation	Mongolia	Deemed a junior synonym of Asiavorator gracilis in 2016	
