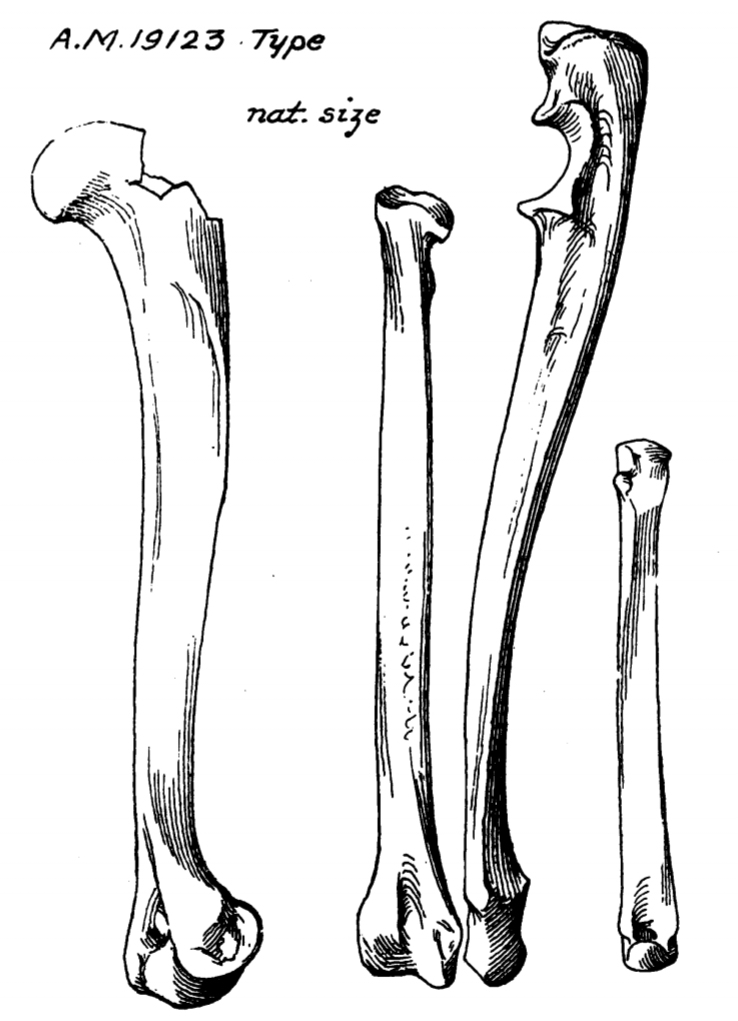
- Holotype limb bones of A. gracilis

Scientific classification
- Kingdom: Animalia
- Phylum: Chordata
- Class: Mammalia
- Order: Carnivora
- Genus: †Asiavorator; Spassov & Lange-Badré, 1995
- Species: †A. gracilis

Binomial name
- †Asiavorator gracilis Matthew & Granger, 1924

Synonyms
- List: Palaeoprionodon gracilis Matthew & Granger, 1924; Asiavorator altidens Spassov and Lange-Badré, 1995; Stenoplesictis simplex Dashzeveg, 1996; Shandgolictis simplex Hunt, 1998

= Asiavorator =

Asiavorator Temporal range: Late Eocene–Early Oligocene

Extinct genus of carnivores

Asiavorator (meaning "Asian devourer") is an extinct genus of civet-like carnivoran belonging in the family Stenoplesictidae. It was endemic to Asia and lived during the Eocene and Oligocene epochs.

The teeth of Asiavorator suggest that it was omnivorous or more precisely, ranged from hypercarnivorous to mesocarnivorous.

== Taxonomic history ==
The first remains of Asiavorator to be found were collected in the 1922 field season of the Central Asiatic Expeditions near the Loh campsite in Övörkhangai Province, Mongolia. This locality is part of the Hsanda Gol Formation. The specimens, designated AMNH 19123, included limb bones and lower teeth. Matthew and Granger (1924) described AMNH 19123 as the type specimen of a new carnivoran species they named Palaeoprionodon gracilis.

The genus Asiavorator was erected by Spassov and Lange-Badré in 1995 as a monotypic genus for their new species A. altidens, with the type specimen of A. altidens being a mandible (FM 487-95) from the Hsanda Gol Formation. Dashzeveg (1996) described a new species of stenoplesictid, Stenoplesictis simplex, based on a mandible (PSS 27-25) from the Ergilin Dzo Formation of Mongolia. In 1998, Hunt reassigned S. simplex to the genus Shandgolictis, renaming it Shandgolictis simplex and assigning it to Aeluroidea.

Later authors found that Asiavorator altidens and Palaeoprionodon gracilis were synonymous and represent a distinct genus, thus the two were synonymized as Asiavorator gracilis, retaining the specific name of the latter and the generic name of the former. A re-examination by Egi et al. (2016) found that the tooth measurements of PSS 27-25 are not notably different from those of AMNH 19123, thus concluding that Stenoplesictis simplex and Shandgolictis simplex are junior synonyms of Asiavorator gracilis. Currently, A. gracilis is the only accepted species in the genus.

== Description ==
Using the carnivoran regression on the specimen PSS 21-25, Asiavorator has been estimated to have a body mass of 3.6 to 5.6 kg. This is larger than Alagtsavbaatar, a feliform known to have been sympatric with Asiavorator, whose body mass has been estimated at 2.6 to 3.6 kg.

=== Skull and teeth ===
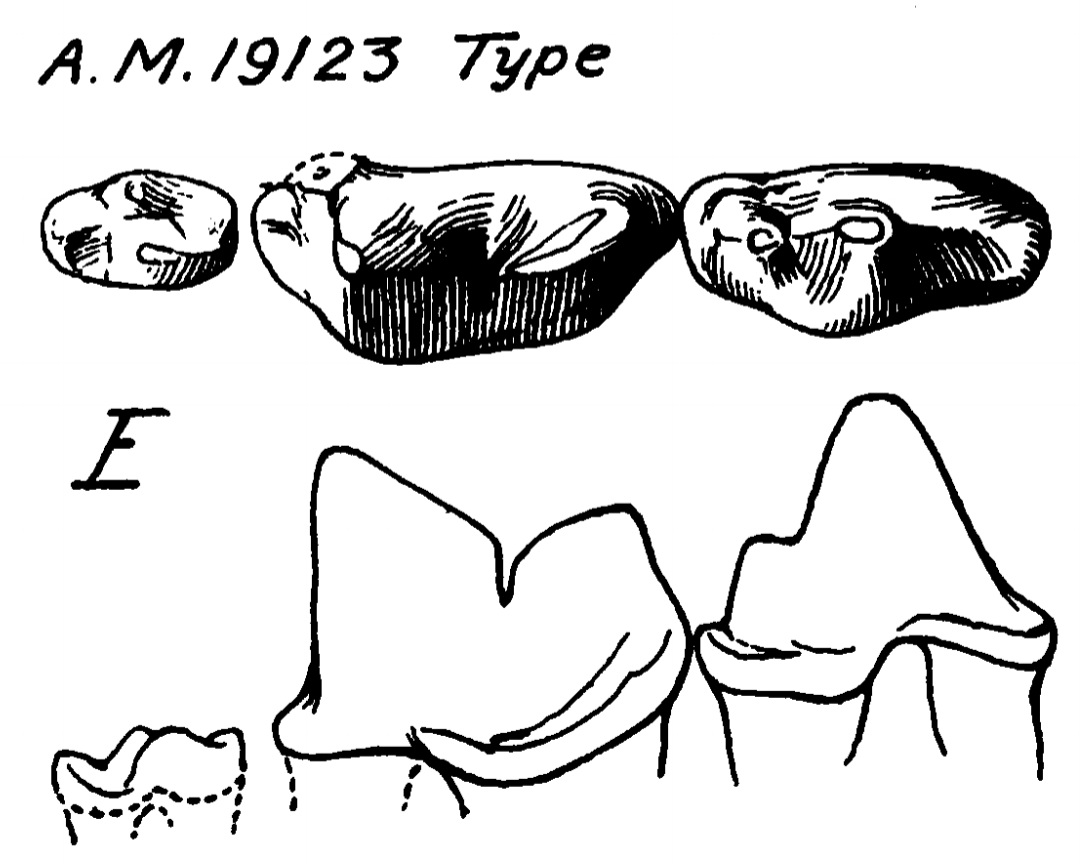
Top and side views of the teeth in the specimen AMNH 19123

Like many other carnivorous mammals, Asiavorator has long and sharp-pointed canine teeth, presumably used in killing prey. The upper and lower canines were approximately equal in length. The carnassial resembles that of a cat, being compressed and possessing a vestigial heel and reduced metaconid. The first upper molar is very elongated, measuring 10 mm long and 4.5 mm wide in the specimen PSS 27-25. An obtuse angle is formed by the shearing edges of the protoconid and paraconid, while the well-developed metaconid is placed against the internal posterior side of the protoconid. The base of the crown has a cingulum on the external side. The second molar is bunodont, and possesses two roots and a flattened trigonid of three low cusps and a trenchant heel. The fourth premolar is large and compressed, similar to the condition seen in domestic cats.

Asiavorator had a well-developed masseteric fossa and a thin mandible. The mandibular corpus has a prominent lower edge below the molars. Below the first molar, the mandibular ramus of the specimen PSS 27-25 measures 13.4 mm in height and 5.6 mm in width.

=== Limbs ===
The limb bones of Asiavorator were slender and long. At its distal end, the humerus expanded transversely with a strong epicondylar bridge. The ulna was wide, and at the proximal half of the shaft it was flattened, whereas the distal half was triangular, though significantly less so than the slender radius in sectional area. Asiavorator had long and slender metatarsals, and the first metatarsal bone was vestigial or absent. The calcaneum lacks a fibular facet. The talus bone possessed deep and narrow trochlea, with a well-developed inner crest.

== Classification ==
In the original description of the holotype, Matthew and Granger (1924) assigned the species to the genus Palaeoprionodon as P. gracilis, referring it to the European genus based on similarities in the dentition and proportions of the limbs, though they did clarify that this referral is provisional until the dentition is better known.

The referred mandible PSS 27-25 was described as a new species, Stenoplesictis simplex, by Dashzeveg (1996). The author placed S. simplex in the family Viverridae following Hunt (1989), which listed the Stenoplesictinae as a probable subfamily of viverrids. This subfamily would later be elevated to family level and renamed Stenoplesictidae. The placement of S. simplex in the genus Stenoplesictis was refuted by Peigné and de Bonis (1999) based on the dentition, though they did not assign the species to another genus. However, they did note that the type specimens of "Palaeoprionodon" gracilis and "Stenoplesictis" simplex were very similar, and that this species likely belonged in the same lineage as "Stenoplesictis" indigenus (later renamed Alagtsavbaatar indigenus).

Spassov and Lange-Badré (1995) did not assign Asiavorator to any family in their description of the genus, placing it as Feliformia incertae sedis. Egi et al. (2016) made the same taxonomic placement for the genus, though they do state that the Mongolian small feliforms (Asiavorator, Alagtsavbaatar and Shandgolictis) appear to form a monophyletic clade relative to the European genera Stenoplesictis, Palaeoprionodon and Haplogale, which independently evolved hypercarnivory. They state this clade is a sister taxon to the extant Feliformia excluding the Nandiniidae.

== Paleoecology ==
The oldest known fossils of Asiavorator originate from the late Eocene-aged Ergilin Dzo Formation of Mongolia, suggesting the genus first evolved during the Ergilian age. Sedimentary analyses suggest the Ergilin Dzo Formation was a floodplain environment with a braided stream network formed by fluvial systems. In this environment, sympatric predators included the nimravids Nimravus and Eofelis, the entelodontid Entelodon, and the related stenoplesictid Alagtsavbaatar.

Most known specimens of Asiavorator were found in the Hsanda Gol Formation, which is dated to around 33.4 to 31 million years ago (early Oligocene). This formation is believed to have been deposited in an open, semi-arid steppe environment with playa lakes and ephemeral rivers. Many types of small mammals would have coexisted with Asiavorator in this habitat, such as several rodent species, the lagomorph Desmatolagus and the erinaceid Palaeoscaptor. Sympatric predators included several species of Hyaenodon, the feliforms Shandgolictis, Nimravus and Palaeogale, the amphicynodontids Amphicynodon and Amphicticeps, and the didymoconids Didymoconus and Ergilictis. Herbivorous mammals were also present, such as the gelocid Pseudogelocus, the largest of these being the hornless rhinocerotoid Paraceratherium transouralicum.
