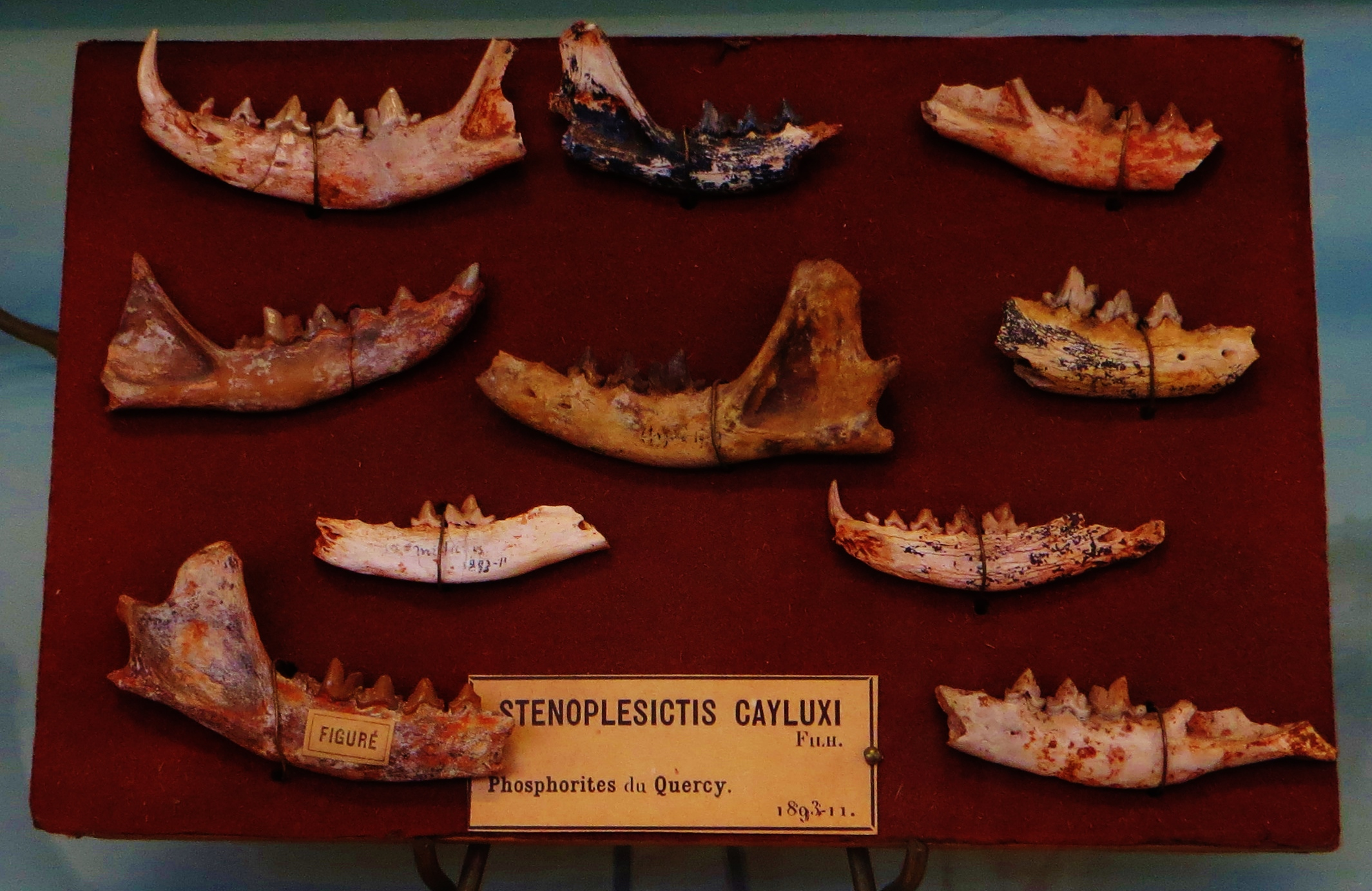
- Fossil of Stenoplesictis, an extinct mammal.

Scientific classification
- Kingdom: Animalia
- Phylum: Chordata
- Class: Mammalia
- Order: Carnivora
- Suborder: Feliformia
- Family: †Stenoplesictidae; Schlosser, 1923

Genera
- †Africanictis; †Alagtsavbaatar; †Anictis; †Asiavorator; †Haplogale; †Herpestides; †Mioprionodon; †Moghradictis; †Palaeoprionodon; †Pseudictis; †Shandgolictis; †Stenogale; †Stenoplesictis; †Viretictis

= Stenoplesictidae =

Stenoplesictidae Temporal range: Eocene–Middle Miocene

Extinct family of carnivores

Stenoplesictidae is the name of a polyphyletic family of extinct civet-like feliforms.

== Taxonomy ==
=== Classification ===
Family †Stenoplesictidae
Family	Image	Genus	Species
†Stenoplesictidae		†Africanictis (Morales et al., 1998)	†A. hyaenoides; †A. meini; †A. schmidtkittleri
†Stenoplesictidae		†Alagtsavbaatar (N. Egi et al., 2016)	†A. indigenus
†Stenoplesictidae		†Anictis (Kretzoi, 1945)	†A. simplicidens
†Stenoplesictidae		†Asiavorator (Spassov & Lange-Badré, 1995)	†A. gracilis
†Stenoplesictidae		†Haplogale (Filhol, 1882)	†H. media
†Stenoplesictidae		†Mioprionodon (Schmidt-Kittler, 1987)	†M. hodopeus; †M. pickfordi
†Stenoplesictidae		†Moghradictis (Morlo, Miller & El-Barkooky, 2007)	†M. nedjema
†Stenoplesictidae		†Palaeoprionodon (Filhol, 1880)	†P. lamandini; †P. mutabilis
†Stenoplesictidae		†Pseudictis (Schlosser, 1887)	†P. guntianus
†Stenoplesictidae		†Shandgolictis (Hunt, 1998)	†S. constans; †S. elegans
†Stenoplesictidae		†Stenogale (Schlosser, 1888)	†S. bransatensis; †S. brevidens; †S. gracilis; †S. intermedia
†Stenoplesictidae		†Stenoplesictis (Filhol, 1880)	†S. cayluxi; †S. crocheti; †S. minor
†Stenoplesictidae		†Viretictis (Bonis, Peigné & M. Hugueney, 1999)	†V. gallardi; †V. julieni
