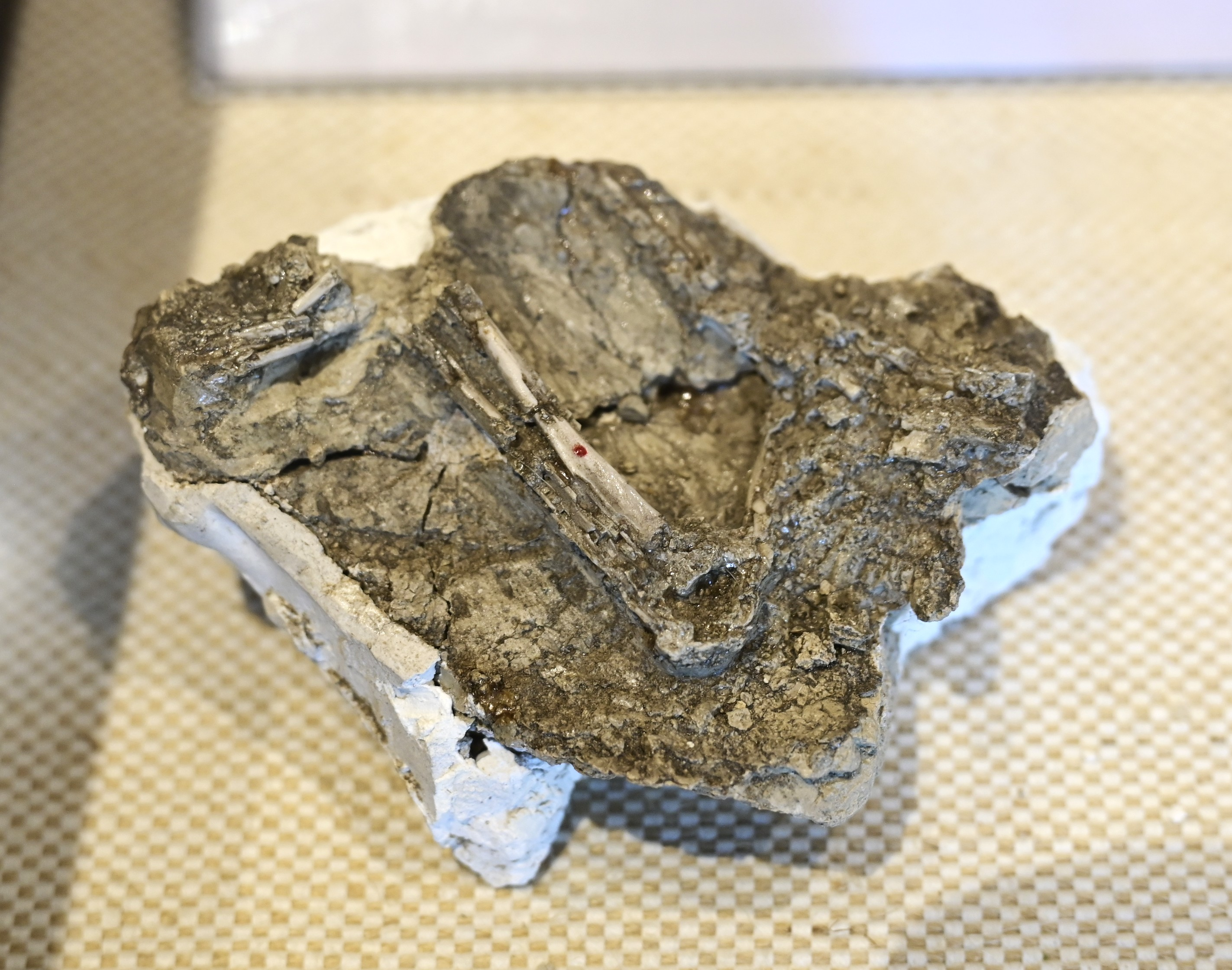
- S. medius skeleton, Paleozoological Museum of China

Scientific classification
- Kingdom: Animalia
- Phylum: Chordata
- Class: Mammalia
- Infraclass: Placentalia
- Order: Lagomorpha
- Family: Leporidae
- Genus: †Shamolagus; Burke, 1941

Type species
- Shamolagus grangeri Burke, 1941

Other species
- Shamolagus medius Burke, 1941

= Shamolagus =

Shamolagus Temporal range: Eocene, 48.6–37.2 Ma

Shamolagus is an extinct genus of lagomorphs that lived in present-day Mongolia during the Upper Eocene. It contains two species, both of which are now extinct: Shamolagus grangeri and S. medius. Both of the species and the genus itself were named by paleontologist J. J. Burke in 1941 based on fossils collected in 1925 and 1928. In the same paper, Burke grouped Shamolagus with Mytonolagus and another new genus Gobiolagus in the newly-named subfamily Mytonolaginae in the rabbit family Leporidae. He further stated that Desmatolagus was descended from Shamolagus despite placing it in a separate subfamily. Further fossils in the form of isolated teeth from central China were assigned by Tong to Shamolagus sp. and Shamolagus cf. medius in 1997.

A third species Shamolagus ninae was described for fossils, two isolated teeth, from Kazahkstan in 1984; the author of the description also placed Shamolagus in the lagomorph family Palaeolagidae without precedent. Later authors considered "S." ninae a member of Eurymylidae or a nomen dubium on account of lacking distinctive features.

Additionally, the species Titanomys franconicus has sometimes been included in Shamolagus.

A 2005 study of early Asian lagomorphs by Chinese paleontologists gave revised descriptions for both S. grangeri and S. medius. It included Shamolagus in the family Leporidae but made no mention of subfamilies. The researchers also briefly discussed "Shamolagus" ninae as a lagomorph of uncertain placement, without offering their own opinions on its status. In the same year, a Russian study place Shamolagus in the newly-erected lagomorph family Strenulagidae and apparently considered S. medius a junior synonym of S. grangeri.
