= Moghradictis =

Moghradictis Temporal range: Miocene

Scientific classification
- Kingdom: Animalia
- Phylum: Chordata
- Class: Mammalia
- Order: Carnivora
- Family: †Stenoplesictidae
- Genus: †Moghradictis; Morlo, Miller, & El-Barkooky, 2007
- Species: †M. nedjema

Binomial name
- †Moghradictis nedjema Morlo, Miller, & El-Barkooky, 2007

Extinct genus of carnivores

Moghradictis is an extinct genus of carnivorous cat-like mammals belonging to the infraorder Aeluroidea, endemic to North Africa (Wadi Moghra, Egypt) during the Early Miocene.

Moghradictis is shown to have an omnivorous diet or more precisely, hypercarnivorous to mesocarnivorous. It is thought to be a member of the Stenoplesictidae family and has only one known species, M. nedjema.
