= Ergilin Dzo Formation =

Geologic formation in Mongolia

- Stratigraphic range: Upper Eocene
- Type: Geological formation
- Sub-units: From top to bottom: Khetsu Tsav member; Ergilin member; Shavag member; Sevkhul member; Zangut member; Khubsugul member

Location
- Region: Dornogovi Province
- Country: Mongolia

Type section
- Named by: Dashzeveg
- Year defined: 1993

The Ergilin Dzo Formation (formerly known as the Ardyn Obo Formation), is a geologic formation in southeastern Mongolia. It preserves fossils of a wide variety of animals, which date back to the late Eocene epoch. The type fauna of the Ergilian Asian land mammal age is defined by the mammalian fossils of this formation.

== Depositional environment ==
Based on the presence of brontotheres and the abundance of herbivorous low-crowned mammals, the Ergilin Dzo Formation has been estimated to be humid and warm/hot with a relatively-closed area. However, the absence of primates and rarity of crocodyliforms (known from one specimen currently) in this formation may suggest the paleoenvironment had open areas and was more arid than similarly aged faunal assemblages from elsewhere in Eurasia. Sedimentary analyses suggest the Ergilin Dzo Formation was a floodplain environment with a braided stream network formed by fluvial systems.

== Fossil content ==
In their review of the vertebrate fauna of the formation, Tsubamoto et al. (2022) found that 77 genera and 104 species of vertebrate have been reported from the Ergilin Dzo Formation, representing 22 orders and 49 families. Fossils of mammals, reptiles (including birds), fish and amphibians have all been recovered from the formation since the early 20th Century.

=== Mammals ===
81 mammal species have been found in the Ergilin Dzo Formation, with perissodactyls being the most diverse group (33 species reported). Ruminant artiodactyls, rhinocerotoids and brontotheres are the most abundant groups in terms of collected specimen numbers.

==== Artiodactyls ====
Artiodactyls reported from the Ergilin Dzo Formation
Genus	Species	Presence	Stratigraphic member	Material	Notes	Images
Anthracotheriidae indet.	Indeterminate	Ergilin Dzo locality.		Left astragalus.	An anthracothere.	
cf. Bothriodon	cf. B. sp.	Ergilin Dzo & Khoer Dhan localities.		Jaw & limb elements.	An anthracothere.	
Brachyhyops	B. trofimovi	Khoer Dzhan locality.		Jaw elements.	An entelodontid.	
Brachyhyops	B. sp.	Ergilin Dzo locality.		Right maxilla fragment.	An entelodontid.	
Entelodon	E. gobiensis	Khoer Dzhan & Ergilin Dzo localities.			An entelodontid.	
Eumeryx	E. sp.				A deer.	
Gobiomeryx	G. dubius				A leptomerycid.	
Lophiomeryx	L. angarae				A lophiomerycid.	
Lophiomeryx	L. sp.				A lophiomerycid.	
Miomeryx	M. altaicus				A leptomerycid.	
Miomeryx	M. sp.				A leptomerycid.	
Praetragulus	P. electus	Khoer Dzhan locality.		Numerous jaw & limb elements.	A hypertragulid.	
Praetragulus	P. gobiae	Ergilin Dzo locality.		Jaw elements.	A hypertragulid.	

==== Cimolestans ====
Cimolestans reported from the Formation
Genus	Species	Presence	Stratigraphic member	Material	Notes	Images
Gobiopithecus	G. khan	Khoer Dzhan locality.	Ergilin Member.	Mandibles.	A pantolestid.	

==== Didymoconids ====
Didymoconids reported from the Ergilin Dzo Formation
Genus	Species	Presence	Stratigraphic member	Material	Notes	Images
Ardynictis	A. furunculus			Skull & jaws.		
Ergilictis	E. reshetovi	Ergilin Dzo locality.		Jaw elements.		

==== Eulipotyphlans ====
Eulipotyphlans reported from the Ergilin Dzo Formation
Genus	Species	Presence	Stratigraphic member	Material	Notes	Images
Amphechinus	A. sp.	Ergilin Dzo locality.	Sevkhul Member.	Left dentary fragment.	A hedgehog.	
Ictopidium?	I.? sp.				A changlelestid.	
Oligochenus	O. grandis	Ergilin Dzo locality.	Sevkhul Member.	Right dentary fragment.	A gymnure.	
Palaeoscaptor?	P.? sp.				A hedgehog.	
Soricinae indet.	Indeterminate				A shrew.	
Tupaiodontinae indet.	Indeterminate	Ergilin Dzo locality.	Ergilin Member.	Premolar.	A changlelestid.	

==== Ferae ====
Ferae reported from the Ergolin Dzo Formation
Genus	Species	Presence	Stratigraphic member	Material	Notes	Images
Alagtsavbaatar	A. indigenus	Alag Tsav & Khoer Dzhan localities.		Jaw & limb elements.	A small feliform.	
Amphicyonidae indet.	Indeterminate	Ergilin Dzo locality.		Tooth.	A bear-dog.	
Asiavorator	A. gracilis	Ergilin Dzo locality.		Right mandible fragment.	A small feliform.	
Eofelis	E. sp.	Khoer Dzhan locality.		Jaw elements.	A nimravid.	
Hyaenodon	H. chunkhtensis	Khoer Dzhan locality.		Left mandibular corpus.	A hyaenodont.	
Hyaenodon	H. eminus	Khoer Dzhan & Ergilin Dzo localities.		Jaw elements.	A hyaenodont.	
Hyaenodon	H. gigas	Khoer Dzhan locality.			A hyaenodont.	
Hyaenodon	H. incertus	Khoer Dzhan & Ergilin Dzo localities.			A hyaenodont.	
Hyaenodon	H. mongoliensis	Khoer Dzhan & Ergilin Dzo localities.			A hyaenodont.	
Hyaenodon	H. pervagus	Khoer Dzhan & Ergilin Dzo localities.			A hyaenodont.	
Hyaenodon	H. pumilus			Mandibular ramus.	A hyaenodont.	
Nimravus	N. mongoliensis	Khoer Dzhan locality.		Jaw & limb elements.	A nimravid.	
Proviverrinae indet.	Indeterminate	Khoer Dzhan locality.		Tooth.	A hyaenodont.	

==== Gliriformes ====
Gliriformes reported from the Ergilin Dzo Formation
Genus	Species	Presence	Stratigraphic member	Material	Notes	Images
Ardynomys	A. olseni			Lower jaw.	A rodent.	
Ardynomys	A. silentiumis				A rodent.	
Ardynomys	A. sp.				A rodent.	
Desmatolagus	D. ardynense				A lagomorph.	
Desmatolagus	D. gobiensis				A lagomorph.	
Desmatolagus	D. robustus			Lower jaws.	A lagomorph.	
Eucricetodon	E. sp.				A rodent.	
Lagomorpha indet.	Indeterminate				A lagomorph.	
Zofiagale	Z. ergilensis	Ergilin Dzo locality.		Right dentary.	An anagalid.	

==== Mesonychians ====
Mesonychians reported from the Ergilin Dzo Formation
Genus	Species	Presence	Stratigraphic member	Material	Notes	Images
Metahapalodectes	M. sp.				A hapalodectid.	
Mongolestes	M. hadrodens				A mesonychid.	

==== Perissodactyls ====
Perissodactyls reported from the Ergilin Dzo Formation
Genus	Species	Presence	Stratigraphic member	Material	Notes	Images
cf. Allacerops	cf. A. sp.	Khoer Dzhan.		Jaw elements.	An eggysodontid.	
"Amynodon"	A. sp.				An amynodont. Amynodon is generally treated as an exclusively North American genus; Asian fossils attributed to Amynodon are in need of reexamination.	
"Amynodon"	A. lunanensis				An amynodont. Classified as a species of Amynodontopsis by Tsubamoto et al. (2022).	
Ardynia	A. praecox	Khoer Dzhan.	Sevkhul & Ergilin members.	Jaw elements.	A hyracodontid.	
Ardynia	A. sp.	Khoer Dzhan.	Sevkhul & Ergilin members.	Jaw fragments.	A hyracodontid.	
Armania	A. asiana	Khoer Dzhan & Ergilin Dzo.	Sevkhul & Ergilin Members.	Jaw elements.	An amynodont or hyracodontid.	
Brontotheriidae indet.	Indeterminate				A brontothere.	
Cadurcodon	C. ardynensis				An amynodont.	
Cadurcodon	C. sp.				An amynodont.	
cf. Deperetella	cf. D. sp.				A deperetellid.	
Embolotherium	E. andrewsi			Skull.	A brontothere.	
Embolotherium	E. grangeri	Khoer Dzhan.		Partial skull.	A brontothere.	
Embolotherium	E. sp.				A brontothere.	
Eomoropus	E. sp.				An eomoropid.	
Eubrontotherium	E. clarnoensis	Ergilin Dzo.		Partial skeleton.	A brontothere.	
Hypsamynodon	H. progressus				An amynodont.	
Juxia	J. borissiaki	Ergilin Dzo locality.	Ergilin Member.	Jaws & teeth.	A paraceratheriid.	
Paraceratheriidae indet.	Indeterminate	Khoer Dzhan.	Ergilin Member.	Teeth.	Initially reported as Urtinotherium (or Paraceratherium) sp.	
Paracolodon	P. inceptus				A helaletid.	
Paracolodon	P. sp.				A helaletid.	
Prohyracodon	P. meridionalis	Khoer Dzhan.	Sevkhul Member.	Jaw elements.	A hyracodontid.	
Prohyracodon	P. obrutschewi				A hyracodontid.	
Prohyracodon	?P. parvum	Khoer Dzhan.	Zangut-Sevkhul member.	Jaw elements.	A hyracodontid.	
Protitan?	"P." robustus				A brontothere, variously treated as a species of Epimanteoceras, a synonym of Protitan grangeri, or a possible synonym of Nasamplus progressus.	
Protembolotherium	P. efremovi	Ergilin Dzo.		Skull elements.	A brontothere.	
Ronzotherium	R. brevirostris				A rhinoceros.	
Ronzotherium	R. orientale	Ergilin Dzo, Bayan Tsav ravine & Khoer Dzhan.	Ergilin Member.	Jaw elements.	A rhinoceros.	
Ronzotherium	R. sp.	Khoer Dzhan.	Ergilin Member.	Fragment of mandibular ramus.	A rhinoceros.	
Schizotherium	S. avitum				A chalicothere.	
Sharamynodon	S. mongoliensis				An amynodont.	
Teleolophus	T. magnus				A deperetellid.	
Urtinotherium	U. parvum				A paraceratheriid.	
cf. Zaisanamynodon	cf. Z. sp.				An amynodont.	

=== Diapsids ===
Diapsids are represented by 20 known species in the formation, with 11 of these being birds.

==== Birds ====
Birds reported from the Ergilin Dzo Formation
Genus	Species	Presence	Stratigraphic member	Material	Notes	Images
Accipitridae indet.	Indeterminate	Khoer Dzhan.		Leg bones.	An accipitrid.	
Anatidae indet.	Indeterminate	Khoer Dzhan.			An anatid.	
Ardeidae indet.	Indeterminate	Khoer Dzhan.			A heron.	
Cygninae indet.	Indeterminate	Khoer Dzhan.			A swan.	
Eogrus	E. sp.	Ergilin Dzo.			An eogruid.	
Ergilornis	E. minor	Ergilin Dzo.			An eogruid.	
Ergilornis	E. rapidus	Ergilin Dzo.			An eogruid.	
Ergilornis	E. sp.				An eogruid.	
Gobicathartes	G. prodigialipes	Ergilin Dzo.			A New World vulture	
Lari indet.	Indeterminate	Khoer Dzhan.		Skull fragment.	A shorebird.	
Rallidae indet.	Indeterminate	Khoer Dzhan.			A rail.	
Sonogrus	S. gregalis				An eogruid.	

==== Crocodyliforms ====
Crocodyliforms reported from the Ergilin Dzo Formation
Genus	Species	Presence	Stratigraphic member	Material	Notes	Images
Crocodyliformes indet.	Indeterminate	Ergilin Dzo.		Tooth.		

==== Squamates ====
Squamates reported from the Ergilin Dzo Formation
Genus	Species	Presence	Stratigraphic member	Material	Notes	Images
Agamidae indet.	Indeterminate				An agamid lizard.	
Lacertilia indet.	Indeterminate				A lizard.	

==== Turtles ====
Turtles reported from the Ergilin Dzo Formation
Genus	Species	Presence	Stratigraphic member	Material	Notes	Images
Chrysemys	C. sp.					
Emydidae gen. et. sp. indet.	Indeterminate				A terrapin.	
Ergilemys	E. insolitus				A tortoise.	
?Melanochelys	?M. elongata					
Platysternidae gen. et. sp. indet.	Indeterminate					
Trionychidae gen. et. sp. indet.	Indeterminate				A softshell turtle.	

=== Amphibians ===
Amphibians reported from the Ergilin Dzo Formation
Genus	Species	Presence	Stratigraphic member	Material	Notes	Images
Urodela gen. et. sp. indet.	Indeterminate				A salamander.	

=== Fish ===
Fish reported from the Formation
Genus	Species	Presence	Stratigraphic member	Material	Notes	Images
Amia	A. sp.				A bowfin.	
Parasilurus	P. sp.				A catfish.	

== See also ==
- List of fossiliferous stratigraphic units
