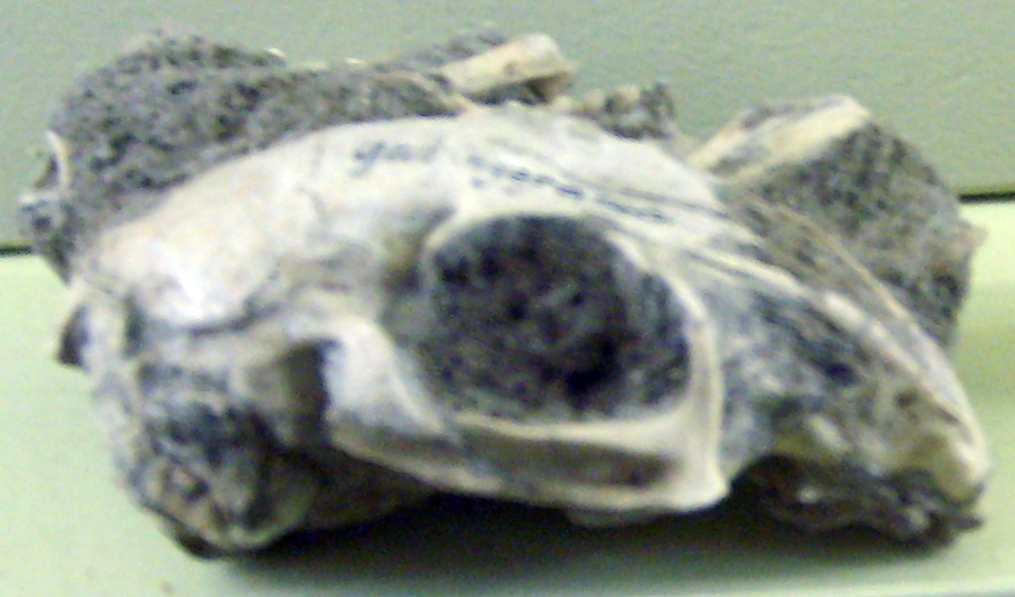
- Serengetilagus praecapensis skull, Naturkunde Museum, Berlin.

Scientific classification
- Kingdom: Animalia
- Phylum: Chordata
- Class: Mammalia
- Infraclass: Placentalia
- Order: Lagomorpha
- Family: Leporidae
- Genus: †Serengetilagus; Dietrich 1942

Species
- †S. praecapensis Dietrich 1942; †S. tchadensis López-Martínez et al 2007

= Serengetilagus =

Serengetilagus Temporal range: 7.0–2.66 Ma

Extinct genus of mammals

Serengetilagus is an extinct genus of lagomorph in the family Leporidae. It lived in the Pliocene of Kenya and Tanzania and the Late Miocene of Chad. Serengetilagus is the best-represented taxon from Laetoli, with approximately 34 percent of fossils in the Laetolil Beds attributed to this genus. Additional specimens from Angola, Morocco and Ukraine may also belong to this genus. It had a number of specific features unknown in other lagomorphs, such as a "missing" mesoflexid on its third premolar.

The genus is represented by two species: Serengetilagus praecapensis, the type species, and S. tchadensis, known from 18 specimens from the Toros Menalla locality of Chad.
