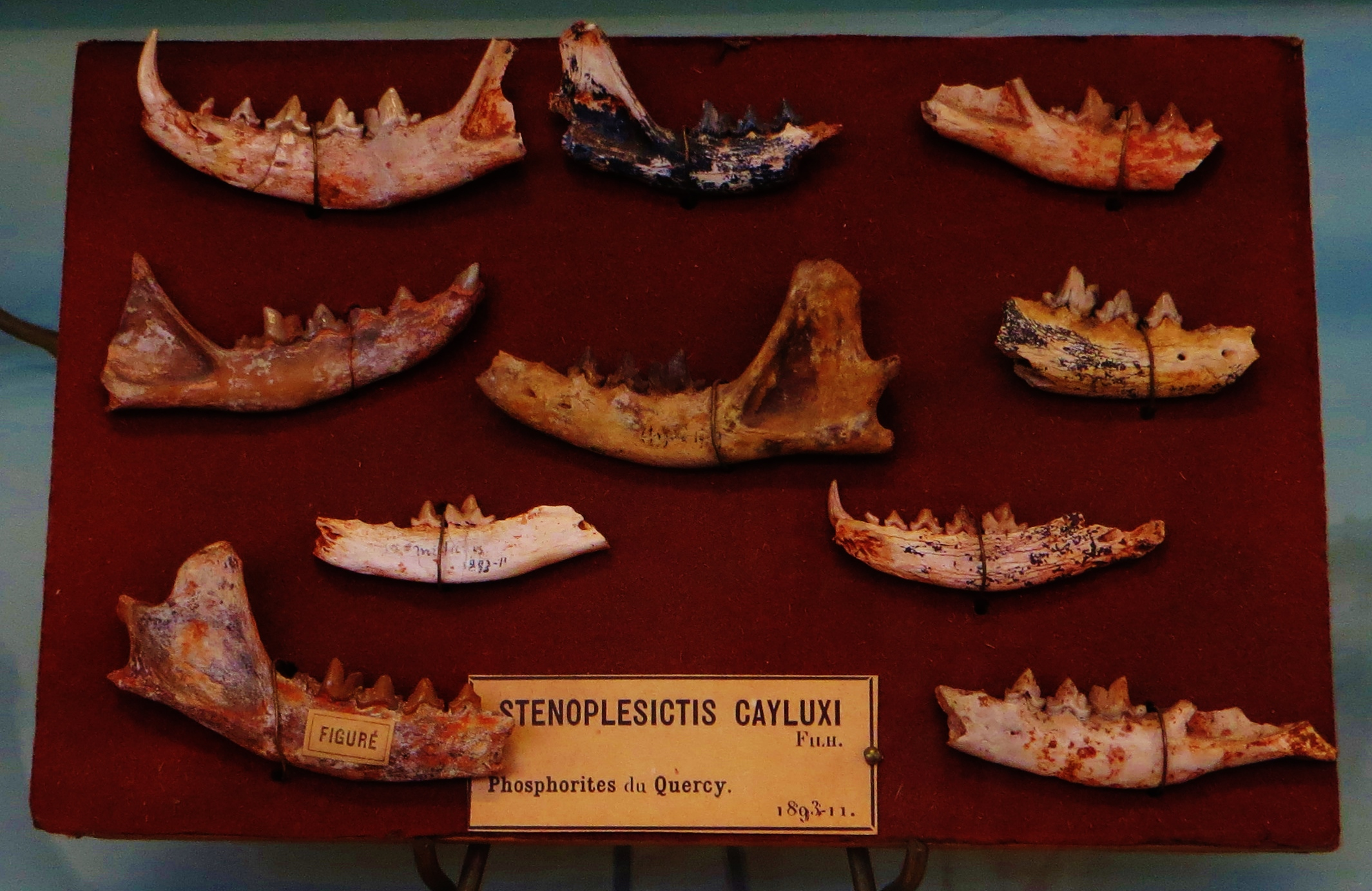
- Stenoplesictis cayluxi mandibles, National Museum of Natural History, France

Scientific classification
- Kingdom: Animalia
- Phylum: Chordata
- Class: Mammalia
- Order: Carnivora
- Family: †Stenoplesictidae
- Genus: †Stenoplesictis; Filhol, 1880

Type species
- †Stenoplesictis cayluxi Filhol, 1880

Other species
- †S. minor Filhol, 1882; †S. crocheti Peigne & de Bonis, 1999; Species pending reassessment: †S. muhoronii Schmidt-Kittler, 1987

= Stenoplesictis =

Stenoplesictis Temporal range: Oligocene (31–23.9 mya)

Extinct genus of carnivorans

Stenoplesictis is an extinct genus of enigmatic aeluroid carnivoran restricted to western Europe that lived during the Oligocene epoch. It was named by Henri Filhol in 1880 and contains the type species S. cayluxi as well as two other species, S. minor and S. crocheti. While several additional species from Asia and Africa had been assigned to it, S. muhoronii is the only species of Stenoplesictis needing a reassignment to another genus.

Species of Stenoplesictis were generally small-sized, with the smallest one, S. minor, being the size of mongooses of the genus Helogale. Stenoplesictis differs from other stenoplesictid relatives like Palaeoprionodon and Haplogale in several traits, including a flattened upper face of the skull, a narrow snout, and specific differences in the auditory region and dentition. It appeared by the Early Oligocene along with various other carnivorans including other stenoplesictids, and lasted up to the Late Oligocene.

== Taxonomy ==
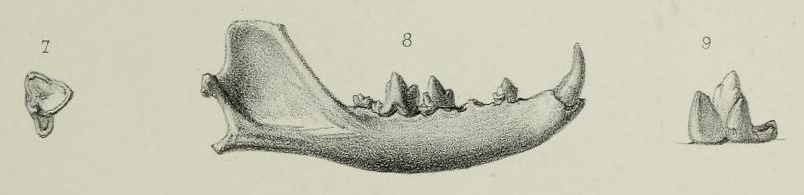
Mandible and lower dentition of Stenoplesictis cayluxi as illustrated in 1882

In 1880, the French palaeontologist Henri Filhol described a maxilla from the French lime phosphate deposits of Caylux, considering it as an unknown mustelid genus. He wrote that the premolars were similar to those of Proailurus but differed by not being as large. Filhol also recorded that the mandible had 3 incisors, 1 canine, 4 premolars, and 2 molars. He erected the genus name Stenoplesictis, referencing it after the fossil mustelid genus Plesictis and creating the species name Stenoplesictis cayluxi. The etymology is derived from στενός (Ancient Greek for "narrow") and the genus name Plesictis, which itself means "near weasel" in Ancient Greek. In 1882, in addition to reaffirming the validity of S. cayluxi, described as small-sized in relation to other carnivorans, he went on to name a smaller-sized species S. minor based on several lower jaws with incomplete dental sets.

In 1924, the Americans palaeontologists William Diller Matthew and Walter W. Granger erected Cynodictis? elegans based on lower dentition from the Hsanda Gol Formation of Mongolia, noting that the genus placement is tentative because of the lack of molars. In 1987, German palaeontologist Norbert Schmidt-Kittler erected S. muhoronii based on a maxilla fragment, deriving it from the Kenyan town of Muhoroni near where the type locality of Songhor was found. C? elegans was reclassified to Stenoplesictis as S. elegans by Demberelyin Dashzeveg in 1996, who also erected S. indigenus based on a lower jaw fragment from the eastern Gobi Desert in Mongolia and S. simplex based on a fragmented lower jaw from the Ergilin Dzo Formation. In 1999, French palaeontologists Stéphane Peigné and Louis de Bonis made S. minor a synonym of S. cayluxi, arguing that the purported differences between the two species are too minor to justify separation. They also created the species S. crocheti, stating that it is a species known from cranial evidence from France that was named after J.-Y Crochet, who discovered the Pech du Fraysse locality in 1971. Additionally, they wrote that S. muhoronii, S. indigenus, S. simplex, and S. elegans did not belong to Stenoplesictis, meaning that they needed to be assigned to other genera. "S." muhoronii being a species pending reassignment was followed by Michael Morlo et al. (or "and colleagues") in 2007.

In 2015, Naoko Egi et al. erected the genus Alagtsavbaatar, reassigning "S." indigenus to it as A. indigenus. They also made S. simplex a synonym of A. gracilis, previously classified in Palaeoprionodon. S. minor as a species was revived by de Bonis et al. in 2022 when they described a cranium that they assigned to it. "Cynodictis" elegans is not considered to be a species of Stenoplesictis and is also currently pending a reassignment to another genus.

=== Classification ===
Stenoplesictis is the type genus of the Stenoplesictidae, an extinct family of the suborder Feliformia. Under the suborder, it is classified in the Aeluroidea, sharing close ties with all the extant feliform families like the Felidae, Viverridae, and Herpestidae. The type species of the genus is S. cayluxi. The Stenoplesictidae had previously been considered as a subfamily of the Viverridae, Stenoplesictinae. The origins of the Feliformia can be traced back from the Middle Eocene, with various families diverging from the Late Eocene to the Oligocene. The Stenoplesictidae is very poorly known but has been recorded from the Oligocene of Eurasia and Miocene of Africa. Stenoplesictictis was among the stenoplesictid genera that was known exclusively from Europe during the Oligocene. Some authors have argued that the Stenoplesictidae is a paraphyletic family group supported only by dental convergences, therefore not making it taxonomically valid. According to Peigné and de Bonis, Stenoplesictis is a primitive genus of feliform but is slightly more derived (or evolutionarily recent) than the extant African palm civet (Nandinia binotata).

== Description ==
=== Skull ===
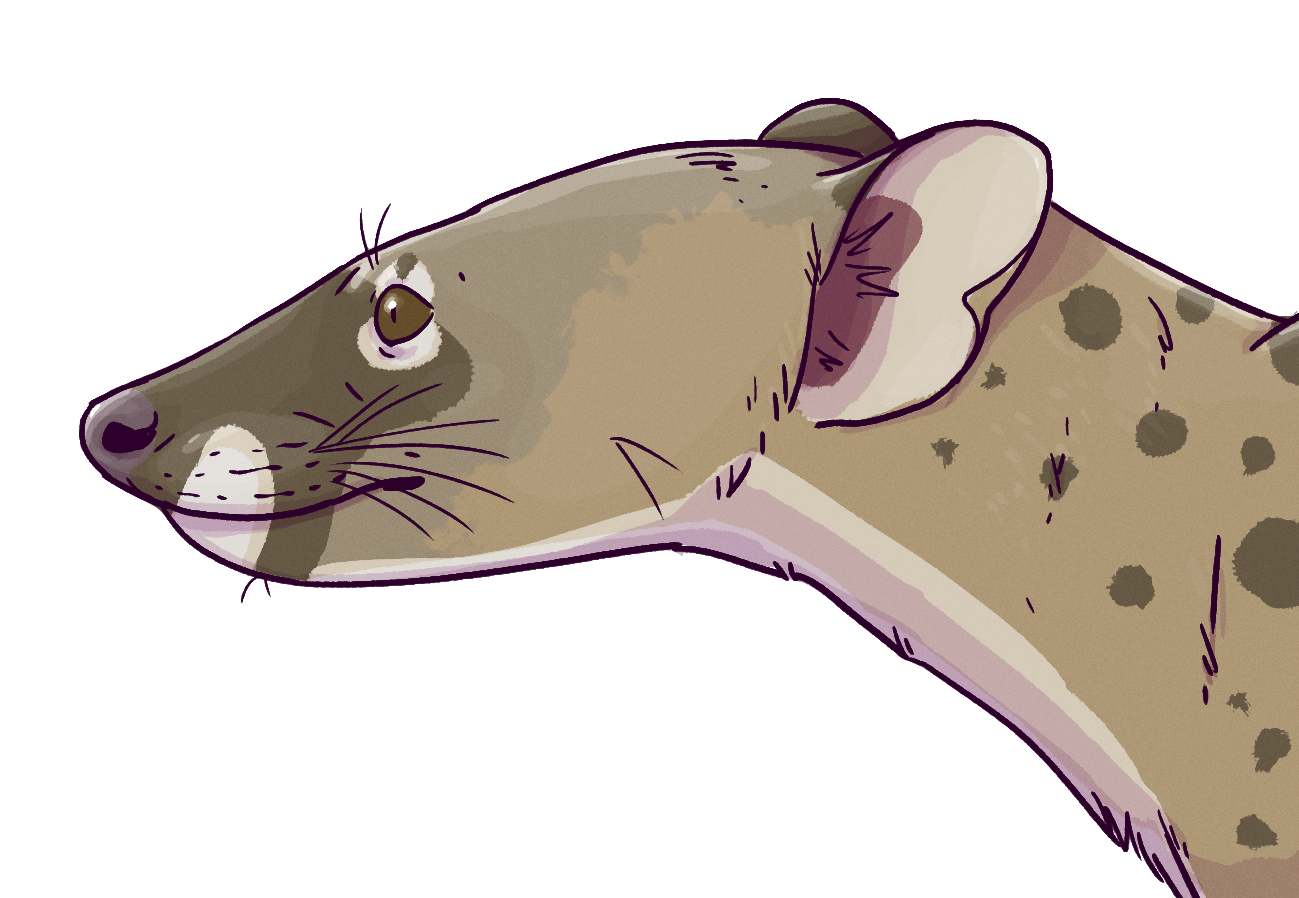
Reconstruction of the head of S. cayluxi

Stenoplesictis differs from other genera in having a flattened upper face of the skull. Its snout is not as narrow as that of another stenoplesictid Haplogale. In terms of addition diagnoses, the lateral (or sideway) edge of the basicranium projects and is in contact with the auditory bulla. Its auditory region is differentiated from Palaeoprionodon by its larger ectotympanic and non-ossified entotympanic that is positioned back and from Stenogale by the lack of any anteroposterior flattened underside process (or tissue projection) on the promontory of the tympanic cavity.

All three species of Stenoplesictis are known from skull material, including crania. The skull of S. cayluxi is narrow and elongated with prominent constrictions in both the postorbital area and that between where the cerebrum and cerebellum of the brain are. The temporal crests at the top sides of the mandible are fused at the area of postorbital constriction, creating a low sagittal crest that, at its back, is divided into two robust nuchal lines ending at the ear canal. The zygomatic arches have extensive lengths and reach outward. The upper side of the skull is flat, its zygomatic bones being slender. The postorbital process on the frontal bone is poorly developed while the paroccipital process is downright-facing, well-developed, and robust with a narrow tip. The palatine bones appear triangular in shape. In regard to a cranium of S. minor, its cranial anatomy being similar to the banded linsang (Prionodon linsang), the skull after a postorbital constriction has an oval shape and the snout appears to be short. The nasals' centers are relatively large, narrowing briefly then diminishing at the area of the orbits' center walls. The postorbital processes are well-developed and appear as two temporal lines meeting upon contact with the occipital bone, in which a low sagittal crest replaces them. The nuchal lines expand on both sides of the cranium. The palatine bones are wide, but the sutures between them and the maxilla are not noticeable. The basisphenoid and basioccipital bones are fused, their side borders expanding on the underside until they form a thin wall bordering the auditory area. The mandibles of Stenoplesictis and Palaeoprionodon are similar, with the latter differing by its smaller size and thinner form.

In the auditory region of S. cayluxi, the elongated auditory bulla consists of the ectotympanic, rostral entotympanic, and caudal entotympanic bones. The promontory of the tympanic cavity is larger than that of the African palm civet, is particularly proportionally large in its underside, and is centered within the middle ear cavity's anteroposterior area. The oval window is round and opens to the middle ear cavity's ectotympanic area. The mastoid process is narrow compared to that of the African calm civet. The ear canal appears oval and lacks any meatal fossa, a depression within the ear's inner region. In that of S. minor, the paroccipital processes appear small and thin. The rostral entotympanic is triangular and goes in between the ear petrosal and the basisphenoid-basioccipital region.

=== Endocast anatomy ===
S. minor is known from a brain endocast probably dating to the Early Oligocene that was uncovered from the Quercy Phosphorites of France at an unknown date. The rhinal sulci have low positions relative to the brain, which suggests that the paleocortex is reduced compared to the neocortex. The olfactory bulbs are pear-shaped, project forward, and are relatively developed, consisting of 3% of the known endocast's brain volume. The cerebrum makes up a considerable portion of the brain's length within a sagittal plane. The coronolateral sulcus appears straight while the suprasylvian sulcus (or suprasylvia) has a slight arch. The cerebellum in comparison occupies a quarter of the brain's total length and makes up for 28% of the endocast's volume.

=== Dentition ===
Stenoplesictis is diagnosed by several dental traits, such as P_{3} (third lower premolar (P/p)), P_{4}, and P^{3} having a distinct accessory cusp located in the tooth's back side. M_{1} (first lower molar (M/m)) has both a reduced metaconid cusp that is larger than those of Palaeoprionodon and Haplogale and a talonid cusp that is longer than that of Haplogale and wider than that of Palaeoprionodon. It also differs from Fejfarictis by multiple dental traits, such as a more reduced metaconid cusp in M_{1} and M_{2} being shorter and having thinner cristid ridges. M_{2} is single-rooted, reduced, and has the protoconid as its tallest cusp. In terms of non-diagnoses, the canine is robust and has both labial and lingual grooves on it. The first premolars at both the upper and lower sides have been evolutionarily lost. P_{2} is asymmetric in shape and simple in appearance.

=== Size ===
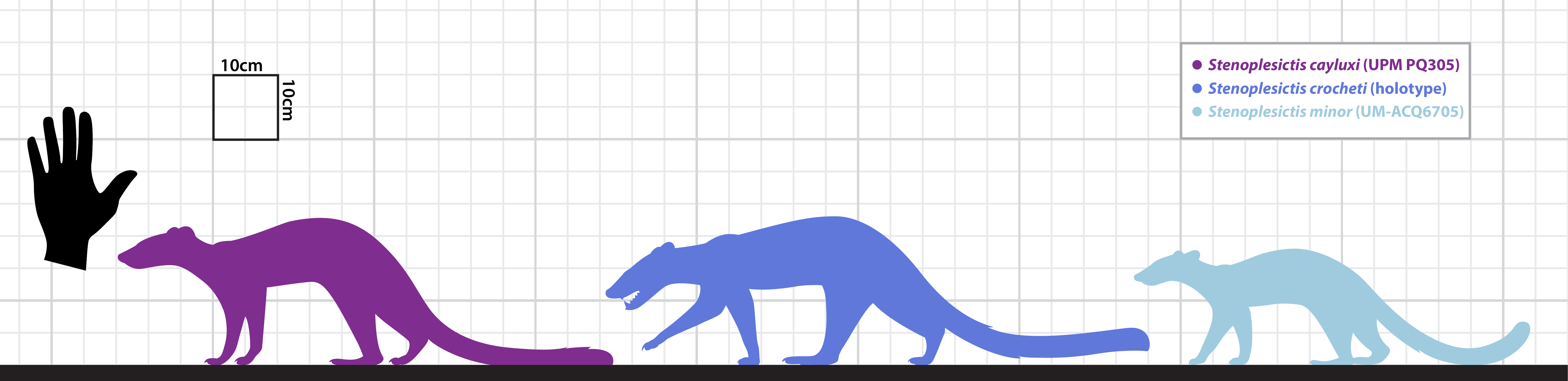
Estimated size comparisons of all three Stenoplesictis species from known remains

S. minor, the smallest species, is thought to have been about half as large as Alagtsavbaatar indigenus, which is slightly larger than S. cayluxi and S. crocheti. S. crocheti is also larger than S. cayluxi. The skull length of S. cayluxi, based on cranial material from Germany and France, is estimated to be from 87 mm (3.4 in) to 90 mm (3.5 in); one skull of S. cayluxi from the lignite mines of the German town of Espenhain is estimated to measure 87 mm (3.4 in) at most. Its skull is somewhat larger than that of Palaeoprionodon at 77 mm (3.0 in). According to Robert M. Hunt, Jr., S. minor would have been comparable in size to the dwarf mongooses of the genus Helogale.

== Palaeoecology ==
=== Early Oligocene ===
Although the Eocene-Oligocene transition marked long-term drastic cooling global climates, western Eurasia was still dominated by humid climates, albeit with dry winter seasons in the Oligocene. Europe during the Oligocene had environments largely adapted to winter-dry seasons and humid seasons that were composed of three separate vegetational belts by latitude, with temperate needleleaf-broadleaved or purely broadleaved deciduous forests aligning with the northernmost belt between 40°N and 50°N, the middle belt of warmth-adapted mixed mesophytic and evergreen broadleaved forests aligning between 40°N and 30°N, and the last belt containing tropical vegetation aligning below 30°N.

Feliforms, represented by the Nimravidae and Aeluroidea, both make their appearances in western Europe at MP21 after the Grande Coupure extinction and faunal turnover event. MP22 records the earliest appearance of Stenoplesictis, more specifically S. cayluxi from the Weisselster Basin of Germany. Two species of Stenoplesictis are recorded in MP23: S. cayluxi and S. minor. For instance, S. aff. cayluxi is known from the French locality of Roqueprune while S. minor is recorded from multiple other French localities dating to MP23, namely Itardies, Pech Crabit 1, and Mounayne. Other mammals known from Itardies include the herpetotheriid Amphiperatherium, nyctithere Darbonetus, erinaceid Tetracus, various bats, large assemblages of rodents, hyaenodonts Hyaenodon and Thereutherium, amphicynodont Amphicynodon, enigmatic feliforms (Stenogale and Palaeogale), nimravid Nimravus, palaeothere Plagiolophus, rhinocerotid Ronzotherium, anoplotheriid Diplobune, cainotheres Plesiomeryx and Caenomeryx, tragulid Iberomeryx, and the bachitheriid Bachitherium. S. minor is last known at MP25.

S. cayluxi extends in temporal range up to MP28, which dates to the Late Oligocene and records a short temporal appearance of S. crocheti. Pech du Fraysse, which dates to MP28 and has known fossil evidence of both S. cayluxi and S. crocheti, also records those of the herpetotheriids Amphiperatherium and Peratherium, talpids Geotrypus and Mygatalpa, theridomyids Issiodoromys and Archaeomys, eomyid Eomys, cricetids Eucricetodon and Pseudocricetodon, glirid Gliravus, hyaenodontid Hyaenodon, ursid Cephalogale, ailurid Amphictis, cainotheres Plesiomeryx and Caenomeryx, suoid Palaeochoerus, and the ruminant Dremotherium.
