= Panolax =

Scientific classification
- Kingdom: Animalia
- Phylum: Chordata
- Class: Mammalia
- Order: Lagomorpha
- Family: Leporidae
- Genus: †Panolax; Cope, 1874

Type species
- Panolax sanctaefidei Cope, 1874

Extinct genus of North American Leporid mammal

Panolax is an extinct genus of North American Leporid mammal that lived during the Cenozoic era during the Neogene period in the Miocene epoch, about 13.6 million to 10.3 million years ago. The genus has one sole species which is Panolax sanctaefidei. The species lives in North America and only been found in the United States, specifically California and New Mexico. P. scanctaefidei feed on insects species making it a insectivore, an organism that has a diet of primarily insects, arthropods and other similar species.
