= Dispersituberoolithus =

Dispersituberoolithus Temporal range: Campanian

Egg fossil classification
- Basic shell type: Ornithoid
- Morphotype: †Ornithoid-prismatic
- Oogenus: †Dispersituberoolithus; Zelenitsky, Hills & Currie, 1996

Oospecies
- †D. exilis Zelenitsky et al. 1996

Dispersituberoolithus is an oogenus of fossil egg, which may have been laid by a bird or non-avian theropod.

== Discovery ==
The eggshell fragments now classified as Dispersituberoolithus were collected between 1987 and 1995 by field crews working for the Royal Tyrrell Museum of Palaeontology. They were first described in 1996 by D.K. Zelenitsky and L.V. Hills, two paleontologists in Department of Geology and Geophysics at the University of Calgary, together with P.J. Currie from the Royal Tyrrell Museum.

== Distribution ==
Dispersituberoolithus exilis is known from several eggshell fragments collected at Little Diablo's Hill at Devil's Coulee, southern Alberta. This is part of Oldman Formation, which is dated to the late Campanian.

== Description ==
Dispersituberoolithus is one of the few fossil eggs of the ornithoid-prismatic morphotype. The outer surface of its eggshell exhibits what is called dispersituberculate ornamentation, i.e. the shell is covered with randomly distributed nodes. Dispersituberoolithus was named for this pattern. Its shell is 0.26 to 0.28 mm thick, and is made up of three structural layers. The innermost layer, called the mammillary layer, is half the thickness of the continuous layer and twice the thickness of the external zone. The boundary between the continuous and the mammillary layers exhibits a squamatic ultrastructure. It has an angusticanaliculate pore system, which means that its pores are long, narrow, and straight.

== Parataxonomy ==
Dispersituberoolithus is classified in the ornithoid-prismatic morphotype (also called the neognathous morphotype). It has not been assigned to any known oofamily. Only one oospecies has been named: D. exilis.

== Parentage ==
Since no embryos of D. exilis are known, it is impossible to determine with certainty whether it was laid by a bird or a non-avian theropod. Zelenitsky et al. (1996) believed it to be the eggs of a bird because its eggshell has an external zone. However the sculpted outer surface of Dispersituberoolithus's shell is unlike bird eggs, and since some non-avian dinosaurs are known to have a three-layered eggshell, the presence or absence of the external zone cannot be reliably used to distinguish avian eggs from non-avian.
