= Alagtsavbaatar =

Alagtsavbaatar Temporal range: Late Eocene

Scientific classification
- Domain: Eukaryota
- Kingdom: Animalia
- Phylum: Chordata
- Class: Mammalia
- Order: Carnivora
- Suborder: Feliformia
- Infraorder: Aeluroidea
- Genus: †Alagtsavbaatar; Egi et al., 2016

Type species
- †Stenoplesictis indigenus Dashzeveg, 1996

Species
- †Alagtsavbaatar indigenus Dashzeveg, 1996

Synonyms
- Stenoplesictis indigenus Dashzeveg, 1996

Extinct genus of carnivores

Alagtsavbaatar (meaning "Alag Tsav hero") is an extinct species of carnivorous cat-like carnivoran belonging to the infraorder Aeluroidea. It was endemic to Asia, with all known specimens being found in Mongolia, and lived during the late Eocene epoch. It is a monotypic genus, with the type and only known species being A. indigenus, and is named after the Alag Tsav locality where its remains were first discovered.

== Taxonomic history ==
The first remains of Alagtsavbaatar to be found were collected in September 1989 by a field party organized by the Geological Institute of the Mongolian Academy of Sciences. The holotype, a right mandibular fragment (PSS 40-15), was collected in the Alag Tsav locality in southeastern Mongolia. Dashzeveg (1996) described PSS 40-15 as the type specimen of a new species he named Stenoplesictis indigenus. The specific name is a Latin word meaning "local".

Egi et al. (2016) found that PSS 40-15 showed dental features not matching Stenoplesictis, and concluded that this specimen represents a previously unknown genus. They erected the genus Alagtsavbaatar for the specimen, with A. indigenus being the type and only species. In addition, a partial left humerus (MPC-M30/80) and two fragments of right mandibles (MPC-M30/81 and MPC-M30/86) were referred to A. indigenus. These referred specimens all originate from Khoer Dzan locality of the Ergilin Dzo Formation, southeastern Mongolia.

== Description ==
Using the carnivoran regression on the holotype specimen (PSS 40-15), Alagtsavbaatar has been estimated to have a body mass of 2.6 to 3.6 kg. This is smaller than Asiavorator, a feliform known to have been sympatric with Alagtsavbaatar, whose body mass has been estimated at 3.6 to 5.6 kg.

=== Jaws and dentition ===
The mandible has a slender and elongated form, with a depth of 9.4 to 9.5 mm. Mental foramina are present below the first and third premolars.

All premolars of Alagtsavbaatar have two roots. Diastemata are present between the premolars, with the one between the second and third premolars being the longest. Based on the alveoli, the second premolar is longer and wider than the first. Buccal cingulids are found on the second, third and fourth premolars, being most strongly developed in the fourth premolar. The third premolar is as tall as the fourth, but its length is intermediate between those of the second and fourth premolars.

The first molar has a buccolingually wide trigonid, high protoconid and lower paraconid. The metaconid is smaller than the paraconid, and is well expressed. The largest talonid cusp is the hypoconid. Notches are observed between the protoconid and paraconid, as well as between the protoconid and metaconid. A cingulid surrounds the trigonid, while a hypoconid and entoconid border the talonid basin. The second molar has two roots, and its crown base is larger than the talonid of the first molar. In addition, the second molar has short talonid, weak buccal cingulid, well-developed paraconid and large protoconid base.

=== Humerus ===
The only known postcranial element of Alagtsavbaatar is a humeral fragment (MPC-M30/80) which appears broken near the distal end of the deltapectoral crest, with the remaining part measuring 41.2 mm in length. Distal to this crest, the narrow supinator crest ends. Proximal to the supinator crest, the anteroposterior and mediolateral diameters of the shaft are 6.5 and 5.3 mm respectively. A moderately developed medial epicondyle is present. Above the trochlear and capitular articular surfaces are the coronoid fossa and radial fossa respectively. A deep olecranon fossa with a thin wall is seen. The trochlea is narrow, with a wider medial rim than median end, forming a large angle against the mediolateral axis. The radial head had a developed capitular eminence, as evidenced by the capitular articular surface displaying a shallow groove on its lateral part.

== Classification ==
In the original description of the holotype, Dashzeveg (1996) assigned the species to the genus Stenoplesictis as S. indigenus, and placed it in the family Viverridae following Hunt (1989), which listed the Stenoplesictinae as a probable subfamily of viverrids. This subfamily would later be elevated to family level and renamed Stenoplesictidae. The placement of this species in Stenoplesictis was refuted by Peigné and de Bonis (1999) based on the dentition, though they did not assign the species to another genus. Egi et al. (2016) did not assign Alagtsavbaatar to any family in their description of the genus, placing it as Feliformia incertae sedis, though they do state that the Mongolian small feliforms (Alagtsavbaatar, Asiavorator and Shandogolictis) appear to form a monophyletic clade relative to the European genera Stenoplesictis, Palaeoprionodon and Haplogale, which independently evolved hypercarnivory. They state this clade is a sister taxon to the extant Feliformia excluding the Nandiniidae.

== Paleoenvironment ==
The known fossils of Alagtsavbaatar originate from the late Eocene-aged Ergilin Dzo Formation of Mongolia. Sedimentary analyses suggest the formation was a floodplain environment with a braided stream network formed by fluvial systems. In this environment, sympatric predators included the nimravids Nimravus and Eofelis, the entelodontid Entelodon, and the related stenoplesictid Asiavorator.
