= Anictis =

Anictis Temporal range: Oligocene

Scientific classification
- Kingdom: Animalia
- Phylum: Chordata
- Class: Mammalia
- Order: Carnivora
- Genus: †Anictis; Kretzoi, 1945
- Species: †A. simplicidens

Binomial name
- †Anictis simplicidens Schlosser, 1890

Extinct genus of carnivores

Anictis is an extinct species of carnivorous cat-like mammal belonging to the infraorder Aeluroidea, endemic to Europe (Quercy, France) living from the Oligocene 33.9—28.4 Ma, existing for approximately 5.4 million years.

Anictis is shown to have an omnivorous diet or more precisely, hypercarnivorous to mesocarnivorous.

== Taxonomy ==
Anictis was named by Kretzoi (1945). It was assigned to Aeluroidea by Hunt (1998); and to Viverridae by Flynn (1998). There is one known species, Anictis simplicidens.
