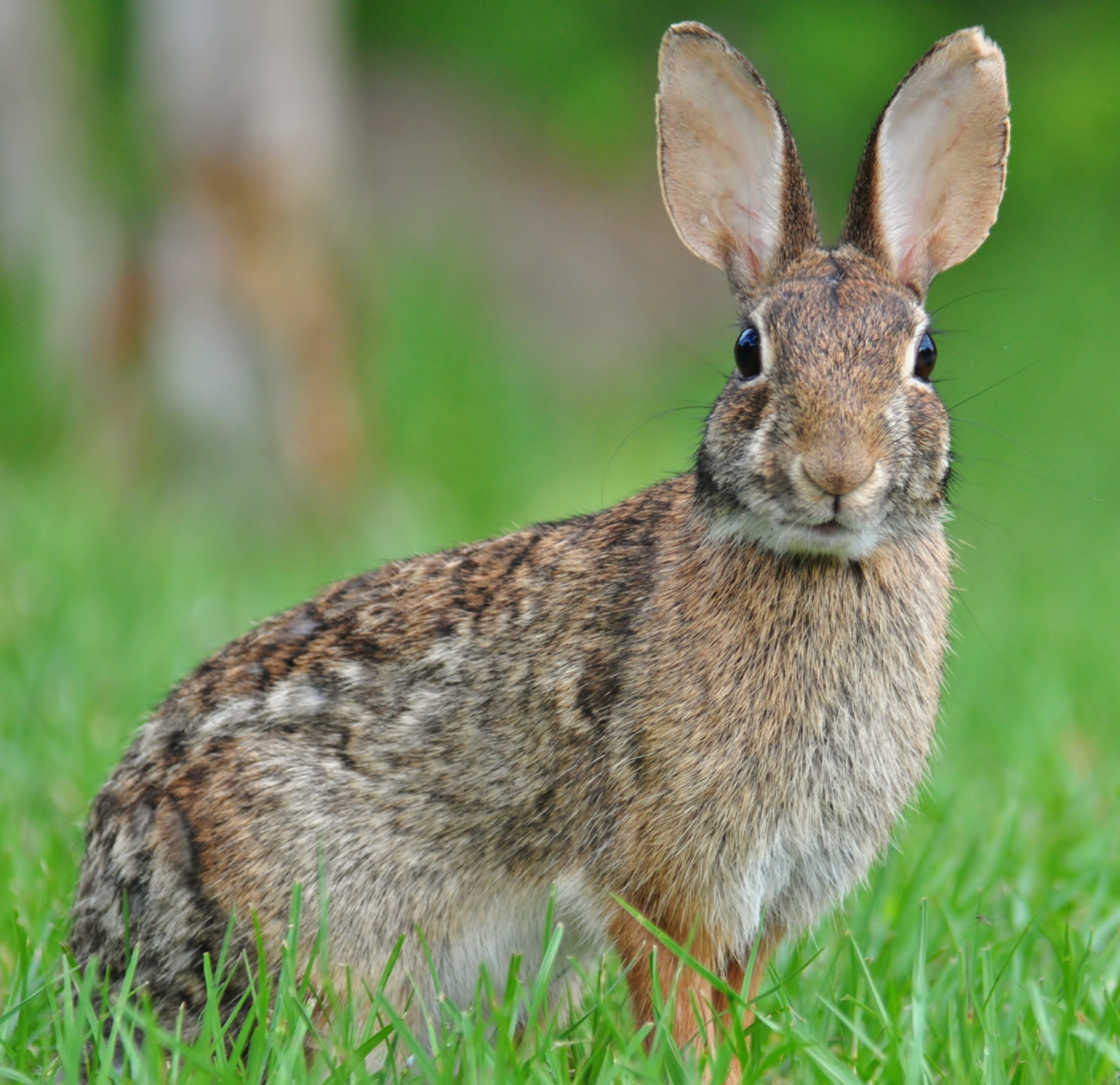
- Eastern cottontail (Sylvilagus floridanus)
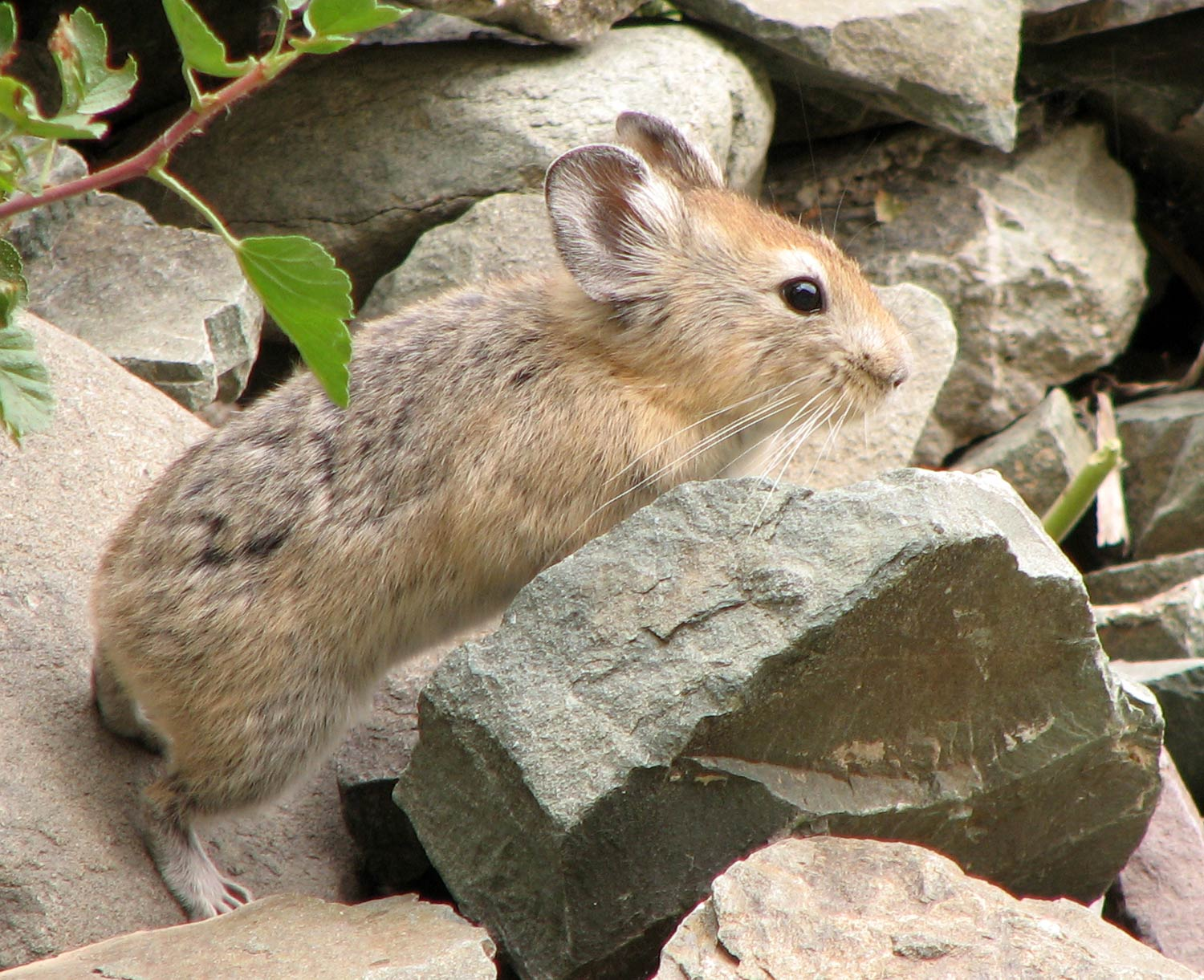
- Large-eared pika (Ochotona macrotis)

Scientific classification
- Kingdom: Animalia
- Phylum: Chordata
- Class: Mammalia
- Grandorder: Glires
- Mirorder: Duplicidentata
- Order: Lagomorpha; Brandt, 1855

Families
- Leporidae; Ochotonidae; †Prolagidae?
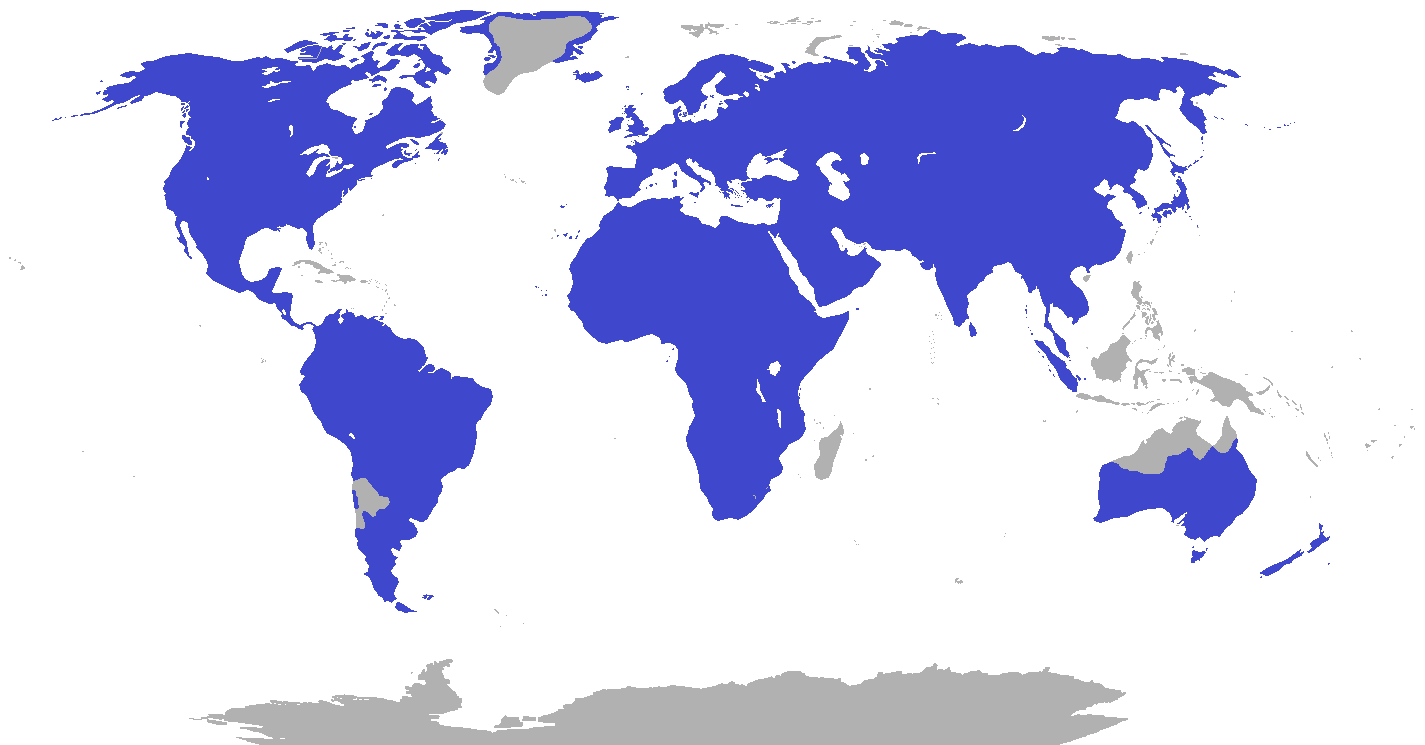
- Range of Lagomorpha including areas of human introduction

= Lagomorpha =

Lagomorphs Temporal range: Late Paleocene – recent

Order of mammals

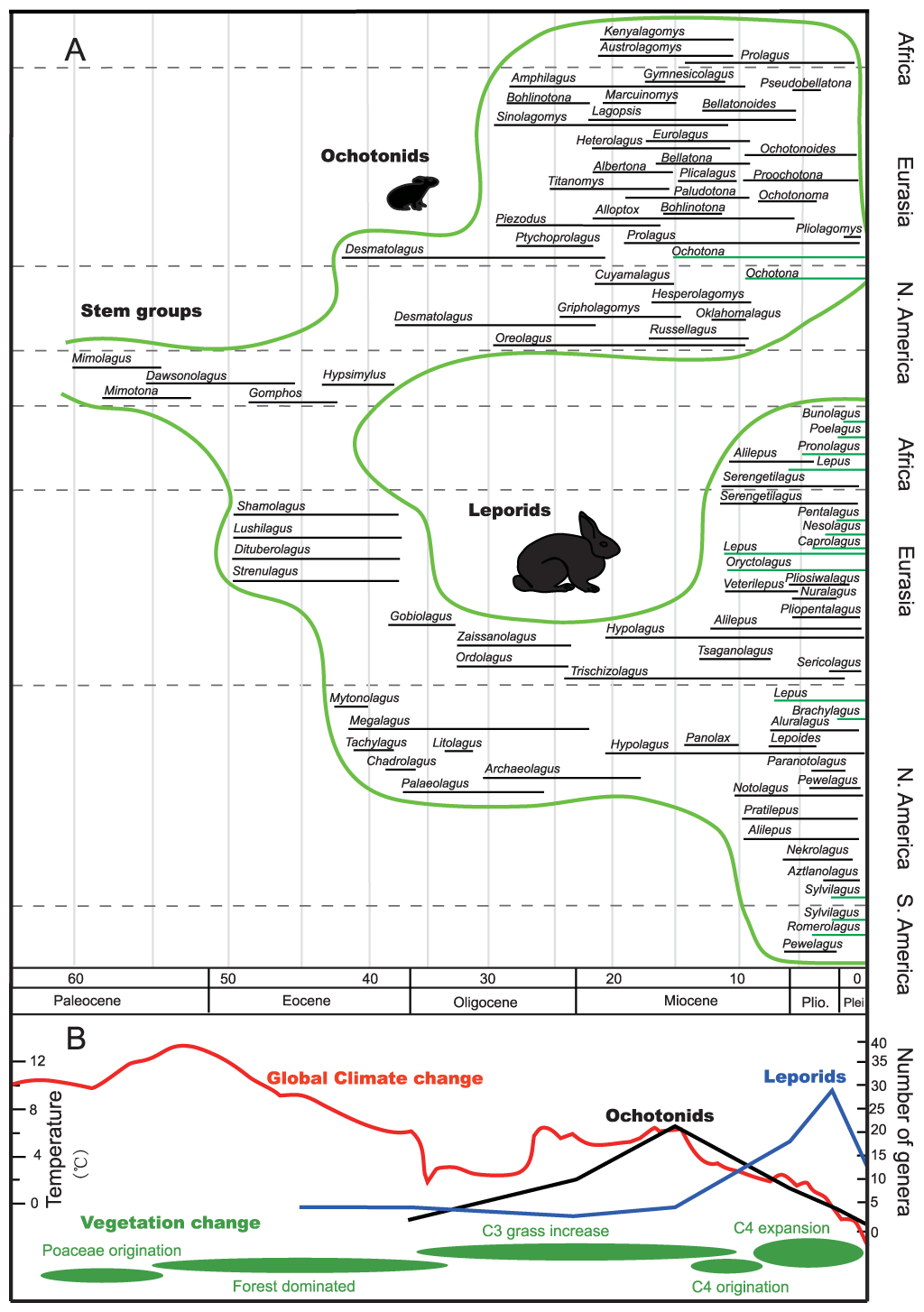
Fossil occurrences of leporids and ochotonids and global environmental change (climate change, C_{3}/C_{4} plants distribution)

The lagomorphs (/ˈlæɡəˌmɔːrf/; from Ancient Greek λαγώς lagós 'hare' and μορφή morphḗ 'form') are the members of the taxonomic order Lagomorpha, of which there are two living families: the Leporidae (rabbits and hares) and the Ochotonidae (pikas). There are 110 recent species of lagomorph, of which 109 species in twelve genera are extant, including ten genera of rabbits (42 species), one genus of hare (33 species), and one genus of pika (34 species); and in which one monospecific genus is recently extinct, that of the Sardinian pika. Lagomorphs are found on every continent in the world except Antarctica, with several regions being host to introduced populations of European rabbits and European hares.

Lagomorphs are closely related to rodents. The two groups are differentiated by their teeth: rodents have two upper incisors, while lagomorphs have four. However, both lagomorphs and rodents must chew on foods with plenty of fiber to prevent these incisors from getting too long, as they will grow continuously throughout these animals' lifespan. Lagomorphs have more cheek teeth (molars and premolars) than do rodents, and they are almost exclusively herbivores. Lagomorphs do not have paw pads – the undersides of their feet are covered in fur.

The term "lagomorph" was first used in the 19th century, and combines the Ancient Greek words for "hare" and "form" to describe an animal that is "hare shaped". The order Lagomorpha was originally a suborder, placed alongside other groups of rodents, and was clarified as being a unique order in 1912. Rabbits, hares and pikas were first grouped together under the name Duplicidentata in 1811 based on the shared characteristic of four upper incisors. The order's evolutionary history is not well understood, though fossil records indicate many more species lived in the past than are currently living – at least twice as many.

== Etymology ==
The name "lagomorph" is derived from two Ancient Greek terms: lagos (λαγώς) 'hare' and morphē (μορφή) 'form'. Together, they describe an animal that is "hare shaped". The title is first attested to in the 19th century. It was coined by the German naturalist Johann Friedrich von Brandt in 1855, who called for a reorganization of the subdivision of rodents containing the rabbits, hares, and pikas. At the time, he described "Lagomorpha" as a suborder of the rodents, which also included Sciuromorpha, Myomorpha, and Hystricomorpha. Lagomorpha was not formally described as an order until American palaeontologist James W. Gidley described it as such in 1912.

== Taxonomy and evolutionary history ==
Other names used for this order, now considered synonymous, include Duplicidentata (Illiger, 1811), Leporini and Leporinorum (Fischer, 1917), Leporida (Averianov, 1999), Neolagomorpha (Averianov, 1999), Ochotonida (Averianov, 1999), and Palarodentia (Haeckel, 1895; Lilian, 2016). The lagomorphs were first described as a group distinct from the rest of the rodents, as they were first classified, in 1811 by Johann Karl Wilhelm Illiger when he erected Duplicidentata. At the time, the rabbit, pikas, and hares were contained in only two genera, Lepus and Lagomys (the hares and the pikas), and it was seen as necessary to further distinguish these animals from rodents based on their teeth, specifically the lagomorphs' four upper incisors. Naturalists would apply various names to this grouping through the following decades, with one of these names being Leporidae, which would later be used to describe just the hares and rabbits. Johann Friedrich von Brandt created the name Lagomorpha in 1855, and this name was solidified as an order in 1912.

The evolutionary history of the lagomorphs is still not well understood. In the late 20th century, it was generally agreed that Eurymylus, which lived in eastern Asia and dates back to the late Paleocene or early Eocene, was an ancestor of the lagomorphs. More recent 21st-century fossil evidence suggests that the lagomorphs may have instead descended from mimotonids, mammals from Paleogene Asia with similar body size and dental structure to early European rabbits such as Megalagus turgidus. Eurymylus is now considered more closely related to rodents (although not a direct ancestor). The name Duplicidentata is sometimes revived to refer to the total group of lagomorphs (i.e., all mammals more closely related to lagomorphs than to rodents). Mimotonids are an example of non-lagomorph duplicidentates.

A 2008 study by evolutionary biologist Kenneth D. Rose and colleagues suggests an Indian origin for the lagomorph order, having possibly evolved in isolation when India was an island continent in the Paleocene. Lagomorph fossils appeared in East Asia in the early Eocene, reaching North America in the late Eocene and Europe in the early Oligocene. Pikas and leporids are estimated to have diverged by the mid-Eocene. The oldest pika is likely Desmatolagus, a small but widespread mammal which lasted from the late Eocene into the early Miocene. Despite the extinction of Desmatolagus, pikas as a whole reached their maximum diversity in the early-middle Miocene, thriving across Asia, Europe, North America, and Africa.

Litolagus, from early Oligocene North America, may be the oldest leporid, and it was certainly one of the earliest to acquire the high-crowned teeth distinctive to modern rabbits and hares. Leporid diversity was relatively low for the next 25 million years, but in the late Miocene (circa 8 million years ago) they abruptly diversified and spread throughout the Northern Hemisphere, in an event called the Leporid Datum. By 7 million years ago, they expanded further into South America and Africa. Leporids show a trend towards increasingly long hind limbs as the modern leaping gait developed.

Lagomorphs were certainly more diverse in the past than in the present, with around 75 genera and over 230 species represented in the fossil record and many more species in a single biome. Lagomorph lineages are declining.

== Characteristics ==
Lagomorphs are similar to other mammals in that they all have hair, four limbs (i.e., they are tetrapods), and mammary glands and are endotherms. Lagomorphs possess a moderately fused postorbital process to the cranium, unlike other small mammals. They differ in that they have a mixture of "basal" and "derived" physical traits.

=== Differences between lagomorphs and other mammals ===
Lagomorphs and rodents form the clade or grandorder Glires. Despite the evolutionary relationship between lagomorphs and rodents, the two orders have some major differences.

Lagomorphs have four incisors in the upper jaw (smaller peg teeth behind larger incisors), whereas rodents only have two. They are similar to rodents in that their incisors grow continuously, thus necessitating constant chewing on fibrous food to prevent the teeth from growing too long. In addition, all lagomorph teeth grow continuously, while for most rodents, only the incisors grow continuously. Lagomorph and rodent incisors are structured differently. Lagomorphs have more cheek teeth than rodents. Both have a large diastema.

Lagomorphs are almost strictly herbivorous, unlike rodents, many of which will eat both meat and vegetable matter. Lagomorphs have no paw pads; instead, the bottoms of their paws are entirely covered with fur, a trait they share with red pandas. Similar to the rodents, bats, and some mammalian insectivores, they have a smooth-surfaced cerebrum. Lagomorphs are unusual among terrestrial mammals in that the females are larger than males and that the testes of males are usually located in front of the penis. Male lagomorphs do not have an os penis. Females have two to five pairs of mammary glands.

=== Differences between families of lagomorphs ===
Rabbits and hares move by jumping, pushing off with their strong hind legs and using their forelimbs to soften the impact on landing. Pikas lack certain skeletal modifications present in leporids, such as a highly arched skull, an upright posture of the head, strong hind limbs and pelvic girdle, and long limbs. Also, pikas have a short nasal region and entirely lack a supraorbital foramen, while leporids have prominent supraorbital foramina and nasal regions.

=== Pikas ===
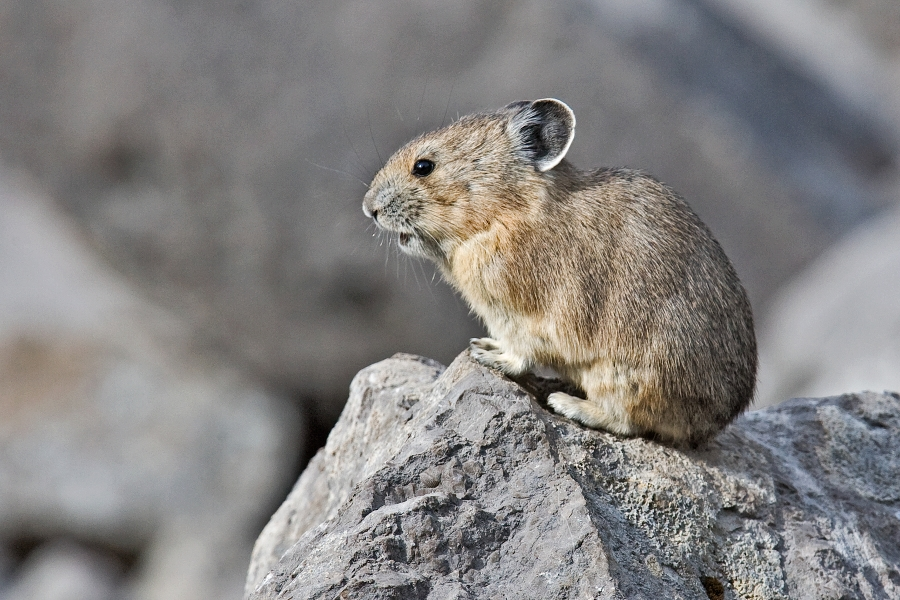
American pika in Alberta

Pikas are entirely represented by the family Ochotonidae and are small mammals native to mountainous regions of western North America and Central Asia. They are mostly about 15 cm (6 in) long and have greyish-brown, silky fur, small rounded ears, and almost no tail. Their four legs are nearly equal in length. Some species live in scree, making their homes in the crevices between broken rocks, while others construct burrows in upland areas. The rock-dwelling species are typically long-lived and solitary, having one or two small litters each year contributing to stable populations. The burrowing species, in contrast, are short-lived, gregarious and have multiple large litters during the year. These species tend to have large swings in population size. The gestation period of the pika is around one month long, and the newborns are altricial (eyes and ears closed, no fur). The social behaviour of the two groups also differs: the rock dwellers aggressively maintain scent-marked territories, while the burrowers live in family groups, they interact vocally with each other and defend a mutual territory. Pikas are diurnal and are active early and late in the day during hot weather. They feed on all sorts of plant material. As they do not hibernate, they make "haypiles" of dried vegetation which they collect and carry back to their homes to store for use during winter.

=== Hares ===
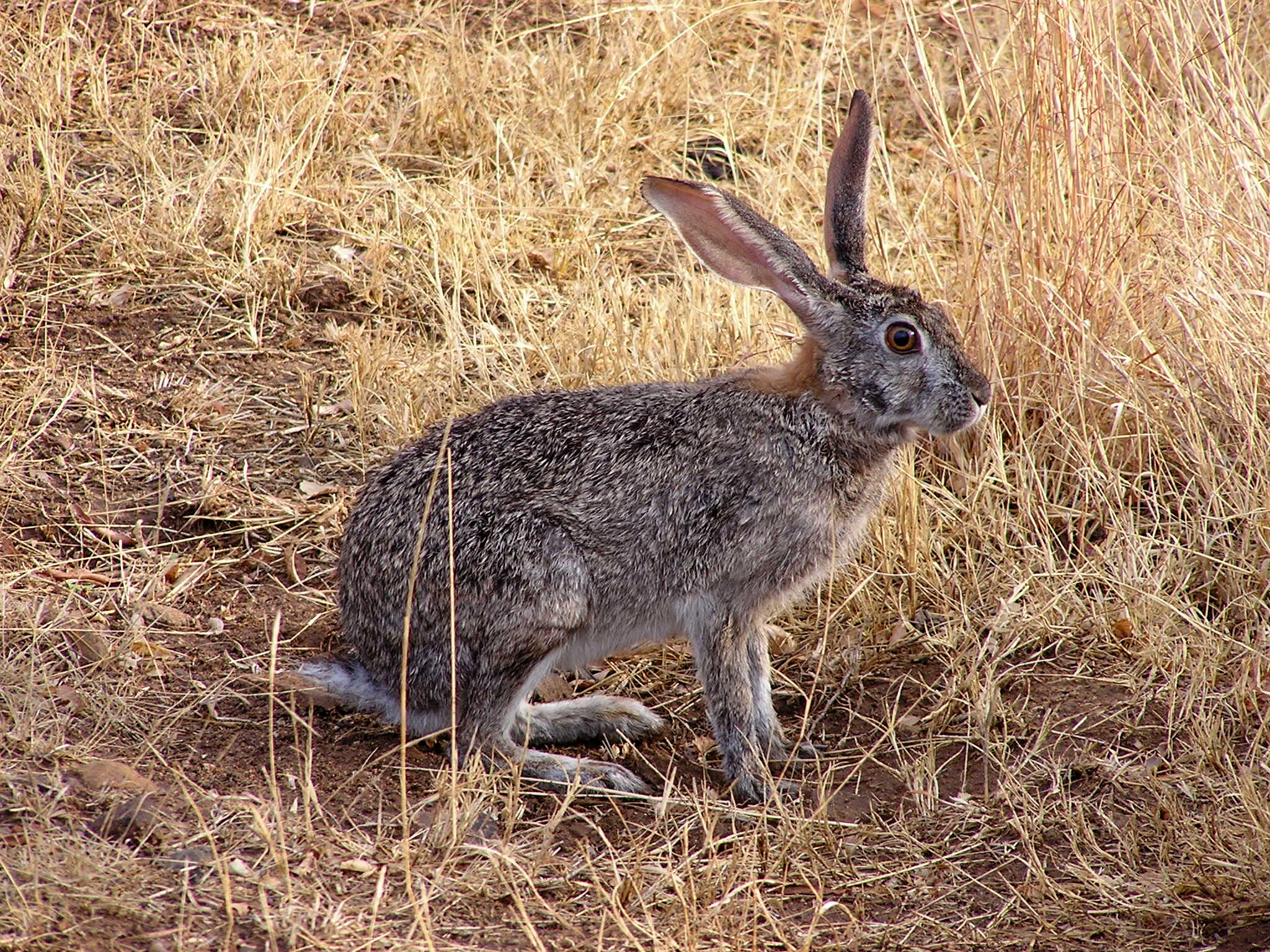
Scrub hare in South Africa

Hares, members of genus Lepus of family Leporidae, are medium size mammals native to Europe, Asia, Africa, and North America. North American jackrabbits are actually hares. Species vary in size from 40 to 70 cm (16 to 28 in) in length and have long powerful back legs, and ears up to 20 cm (8 in) in length. Although usually greyish-brown, some species turn white in the winter. They are solitary animals. Newborns are precocial (eyes and ears open, fully furred). Several litters are born during the year in a form (a nest above ground, usually under a bush). They are preyed upon by large mammalian carnivores and birds of prey.

=== Rabbits ===
Rabbits, members of the Leporidae family (excluding Lepus (hares)) are generally much smaller than hares and include the rock hares and the hispid hare. They are native to Europe, parts of Africa, Central and Southern Asia, North America and much of South America. They inhabit both grassland and arid regions. They vary in size from 20 to 50 cm (8 to 20 in) and have long, powerful hind legs, shorter forelegs and a tiny tail. The colour is some shade of brown, buff or grey and there is one black species and two striped ones. Domestic rabbits come in a wider variety of colours. Newborn rabbits are altricial (eyes and ears closed, no fur). Although most species live in burrows, the cottontails and hispid hares have forms (nests above ground, usually under a bush). Most of the burrowing species are colonial, and feed together in small groups. Rabbits play an important part in the terrestrial food chain, eating a wide range of forbs, grasses, and herbs, and being part of the staple diet of many carnivorous species. One species of rabbit has been domesticated, that being the European rabbit.

== Distribution ==
Lagomorphs are widespread around the world and inhabit every continent except Antarctica. However, they are not found in the West Indies or Madagascar, nor on many islands. Although they are not native to Australia, European rabbits have been introduced there, where they have successfully colonized many parts of the country and caused disruption to native species. Though they are not native there, European hares exist in much of the southern cone of South America.

== Biology ==
=== Digestion ===
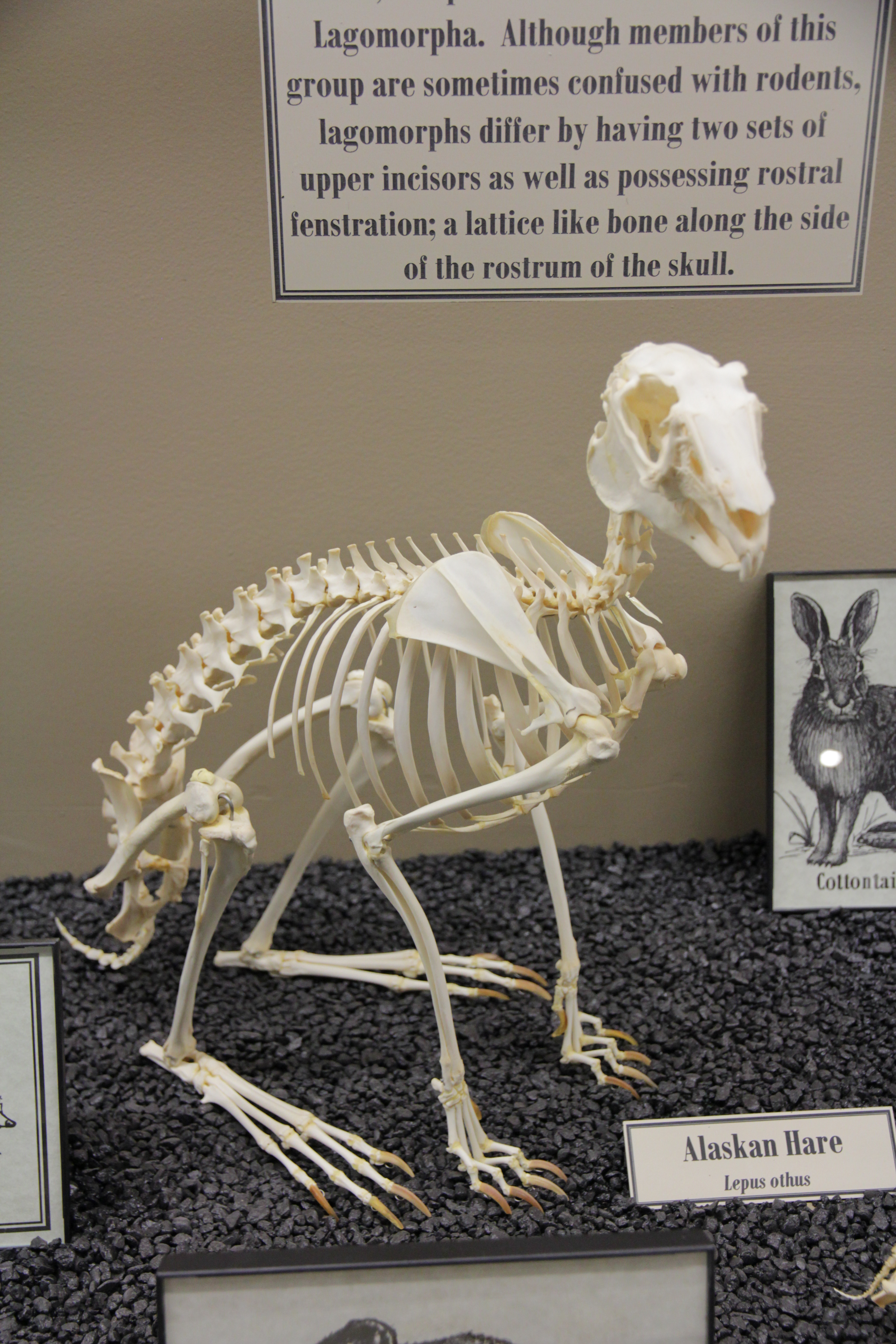
Skeleton of Alaskan hare (Museum of Osteology)

Easily digestible food is processed in the gastrointestinal tract and expelled as regular feces. But in order to get nutrients out of hard to digest fiber, lagomorphs ferment fiber in the cecum (in the GI tract) and then expel the contents as cecotropes, which are reingested (cecotrophy). The cecotropes are then absorbed in the small intestine to utilize the nutrients. Like rodents, they are not able to vomit.

=== Birth and early life ===
Many lagomorphs breed several times a year and produce large litters. This is particularly the case in species that live in underground, protective environments, such as burrows. The young of rabbits and pikas (called kits) are born after a short gestation period and the mother can become pregnant again almost immediately after giving birth. The mothers are able to leave these young safely and go off to feed, returning at intervals to feed them with their unusually rich milk. In some species, the mother only visits and feeds the litter once a day but the young grow rapidly and are usually weaned within a month.

=== Sociality and safety ===
Many species of lagomorphs, particularly the rabbits and the pikas, are gregarious and live in colonies, whereas hares are generally solitary species, although many hares travel and forage in groups of two, three, or four. Many rabbits and pikas rely on their burrows as places of safety when danger threatens, but hares rely on their long legs, great speed and jinking gait to escape from predators.

== Classification ==
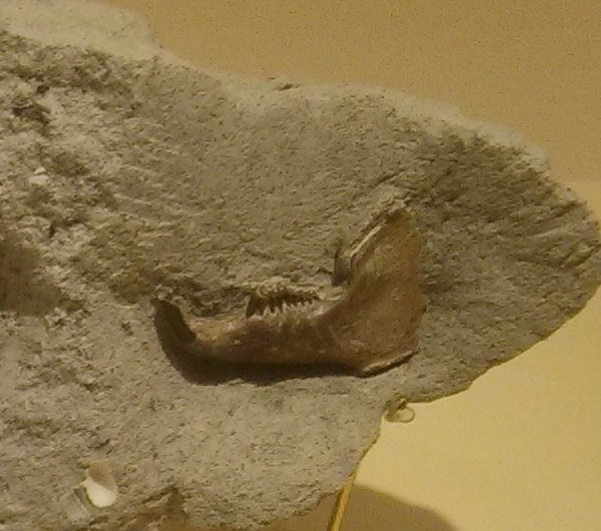
Alloptox japonicus jaw

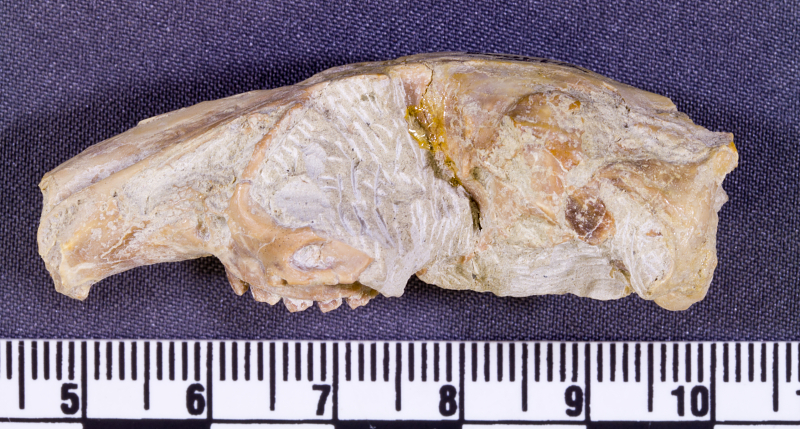
Palaeolagus skull

=== Recent genera ===
- Order Lagomorpha Brandt 1885
  - Family Leporidae Fischer de Waldheim 1817 (rabbits and hares)
    - Subfamily Leporinae Trouessart 1880
      - Genus Brachylagus
      - Genus Bunolagus
      - Genus Caprolagus Blyth 1845
      - Genus Lepus Linnaeus 1758 (hare)
      - Genus Nesolagus Forsyth Major 1899
      - Genus Oryctolagus Lilljeborg 1874
      - Genus Pentalagus Lyon 1904
      - Genus Poelagus
      - Genus Pronolagus Lyon 1904
      - Genus Romerolagus Merriam 1896
      - Genus Sylvilagus Gray 1867
  - Family Ochotonidae Thomas 1897 (pikas)
    - Genus Ochotona Link 1795
    - Genus †Prolagus Pomel 1853 (considered by some sources to be the sole member of the family Prolagidae)

=== Fossil genera ===
- Order Lagomorpha Brandt 1885
  - Family Leporidae Fischer de Waldheim 1817 (rabbits and hares)
    - Subfamily † Archaeolaginae
      - Genus †Archaeolagus Dice 1917
      - Genus †Hypolagus Dice 1917
      - Genus †Notolagus Wilson 1938
      - Genus †Panolax Cope 1874
    - Subfamily Leporinae Trouessart 1880
      - Genus †Alilepus Dice 1931
      - Genus †Nuralagus Lilljeborg 1874
      - Genus †Pliolagus Kormos 1934
      - Genus †Pliosiwalagus Patnaik 2001
      - Genus †Pratilepus Hibbard 1939
      - Genus †Serengetilagus Dietrich 1941
    - Subfamily †Palaeolaginae Dice 1929
      - Tribe †Dasyporcina Gray 1825
        - Genus †Coelogenys Illiger 1811
        - Genus †Agispelagus Argyropulo 1939
        - Genus †Aluralagus Downey 1968
        - Genus †Austrolagomys Stromer 1926
        - Genus †Aztlanolagus Russell & Harris 1986
        - Genus †Chadrolagus Gawne 1978
        - Genus †Gobiolagus Burke 1941
        - Genus †Lagotherium Pictet 1853
        - Genus †Lepoides White 1988
        - Genus †Nekrolagus Hibbard 1939
        - Genus †Ordolagus de Muizon 1977
        - Genus †Paranotolagus Miller & Carranza-Castaneda 1982
        - Genus †Pewelagus White 1984
        - Genus †Pliopentalagus Gureev & Konkova 1964
        - Genus †Pronotolagus White 1991
        - Genus †Tachylagus Storer 1992
        - Genus †Trischizolagus Radulesco & Samson 1967
        - Genus †Veterilepus Radulesco & Samson 1967
      - Tribe incertae sedis
        - Genus †Litolagus Dawson 1958
        - Genus †Megalagus Walker 1931
        - Genus †Mytonolagus Burke 1934
        - Genus †Palaeolagus Leidy 1856
  - Family Ochotonidae Thomas 1897 (pikas)
    - Genus †Alloptox Dawson 1961
    - Genus †Amphilagus Tobien 1974
    - Genus †Bellatona Dawson 1961
    - Genus †Cuyamalagus Hutchison & Lindsay 1974
    - Genus †Desmatolagus Matthew & Granger 1923
    - Genus †Gripholagomys Green 1972
    - Genus †Hesperolagomys Clark et al. 1964
    - Genus †Kenyalagomys MacInnes 1953
    - Genus †Lagopsis Schlosser 1894
    - Genus †Ochotonoides Teilhard de Jardin & Young 1931
    - Genus †Ochotonoma Sen 1998
    - Genus †Oklahomalagus Dalquest et al. 1996
    - Genus †Oreolagus Dice 1917
    - Genus †Piezodus Viret 1929
    - Genus †Russellagus Storer 1970
    - Genus †Sinolagomys Bohlin 1937
    - Genus †Titanomys von Meyer 1843
  - Family incertae sedis
    - Genus †Eurolagus Lopez Martinez 1977
    - Genus †Hsiuannania Xu 1976
    - Genus †Hypsimylus Zhai 1977
    - Genus †Lushilagus Li 1965
    - Genus †Oligolagus Albright et al. 2026
    - Genus †Shamolagus Burke 1941
