= Desmatolagus =

Scientific classification
- Kingdom: Animalia
- Phylum: Chordata
- Class: Mammalia
- Infraclass: Placentalia
- Order: Lagomorpha
- Family: Ochotonidae
- Genus: †Desmatolagus; Matthew et Granger, 1923

Type species
- Desmatolagus gobiensis

Synonyms
- Agispelagus

Extinct genus of mammals

Desmatolagus is an extinct genus of early lagomorph first named in 1923.

In 1940, the genus Agispelagus was described for the species A. simplex, to which a second species A. youngi was added in 1960. However, A. youngi was later determined to be a junior synonym of Desmatolagus robustus, and A. simplex was subsequently reassigned to the same genus, leaving Agispelagus a junior synonym of Desmatolagus.
