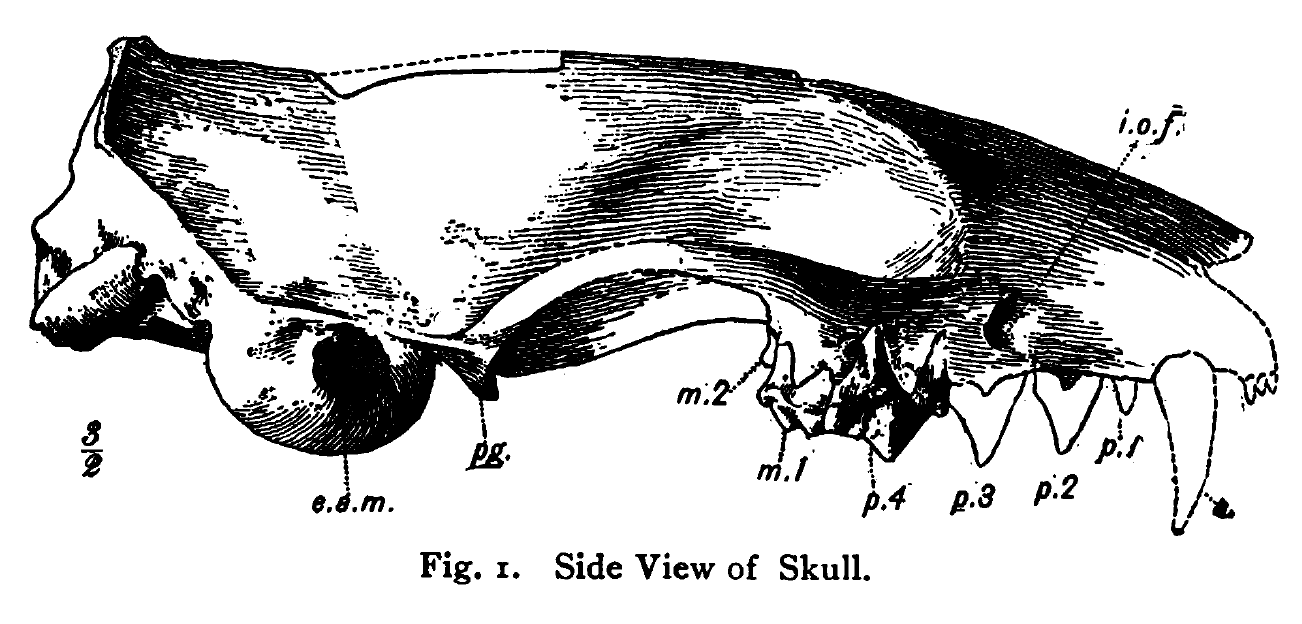
- Lateral view of Bunaelurus (=Palaeogale) from Matthew 1902

Scientific classification
- Kingdom: Animalia
- Phylum: Chordata
- Class: Mammalia
- Infraclass: Placentalia
- Order: Carnivora
- Suborder: Feliformia
- Family: †Palaeogalidae
- Genus: †Palaeogale von Meyer 1846, p. 474

Species
- †P. dorothiae Macdonald 1963, p. 219; †P. evanoffi Welsh 2021; †P. felina Filhol 1877, p. 39; †P. hyaenoides Dehm 1950; †P. lagophagus Cope 1873; †P. minuta (type) Gervais 1848, Pl. XVIII, p. 10; †P. praehyaenoides Morlo 1996; †P. sanguinarius Loomis 1932; †P. sectoria Gervais 1848, Pl. XVIII, p. 10

Synonyms
- Bunaelurus Cope 1873

= Palaeogale =

Palaeogale Temporal range: 33.9–15.97 Ma

Extinct genus of carnivores

Palaeogale is an extinct genus of carnivorous mammal known from the Late Eocene, Oligocene, and Early Miocene of North America, Europe, and Eastern Asia. A small carnivore often associated with the mustelids, Palaeogale might have been similar to living genets, civets, and linsangs.

== Time range ==
The ancestry of Palaeogale remains enigmatic. The genus appears in Europe 32 Ma, after the Grande Coupure, but 35-36 Ma-old (Chadronian NALMA) specimens from Pipestone Springs, Montana, are the oldest known. Palaeogale survived until the late Early Miocene of Europe and the early Early Miocene of East Asia.

Morlo & Nagel 2007 noted that the Palaeogale specimens found in Mongolia are the most plesiomorphic (p1 double-rooted, m2 relatively large, very small overall size) and that the genus probably originated there and migrated to Europe and North America.

== Anatomy ==
Palaeogale was the size of a small mustelid but had a hypercarnivorous dentition and its taxonomic position remains enigmatic. Its dental morphology includes both mustelid (reduced m2) and feliform (slit-like carnassial notch, loss of metaconid on m2, presence of parastyle on P4) features, and Palaeogale is typically placed in Carnivora incertae sedis.

The body mass of Palaeogale sectoria, one of the smallest species, has been estimated to much less than a kilo based on teeth sizes. It was probably semifossorial. P. sanguinarius is slightly larger than P. dorothiae and probably equivalent in age.

== Taxonomic history ==
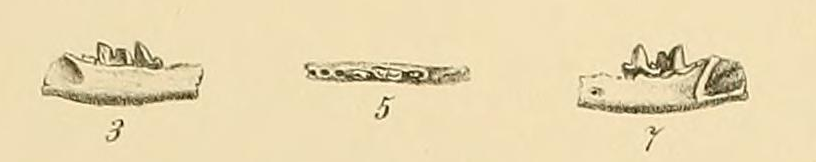
Mandible of the type species P. minuta, from Schlosser 1888

When von Meyer 1846 named the genus Palaeogale and two species (P. pulchella and P. fecunda), he only gave a very vague description of these taxa. Gervais 1848 described a related species, Mustela minuta, which Schlosser 1888 thought identical and named Palaeogale minuta, a name that has remained accepted for the type species.

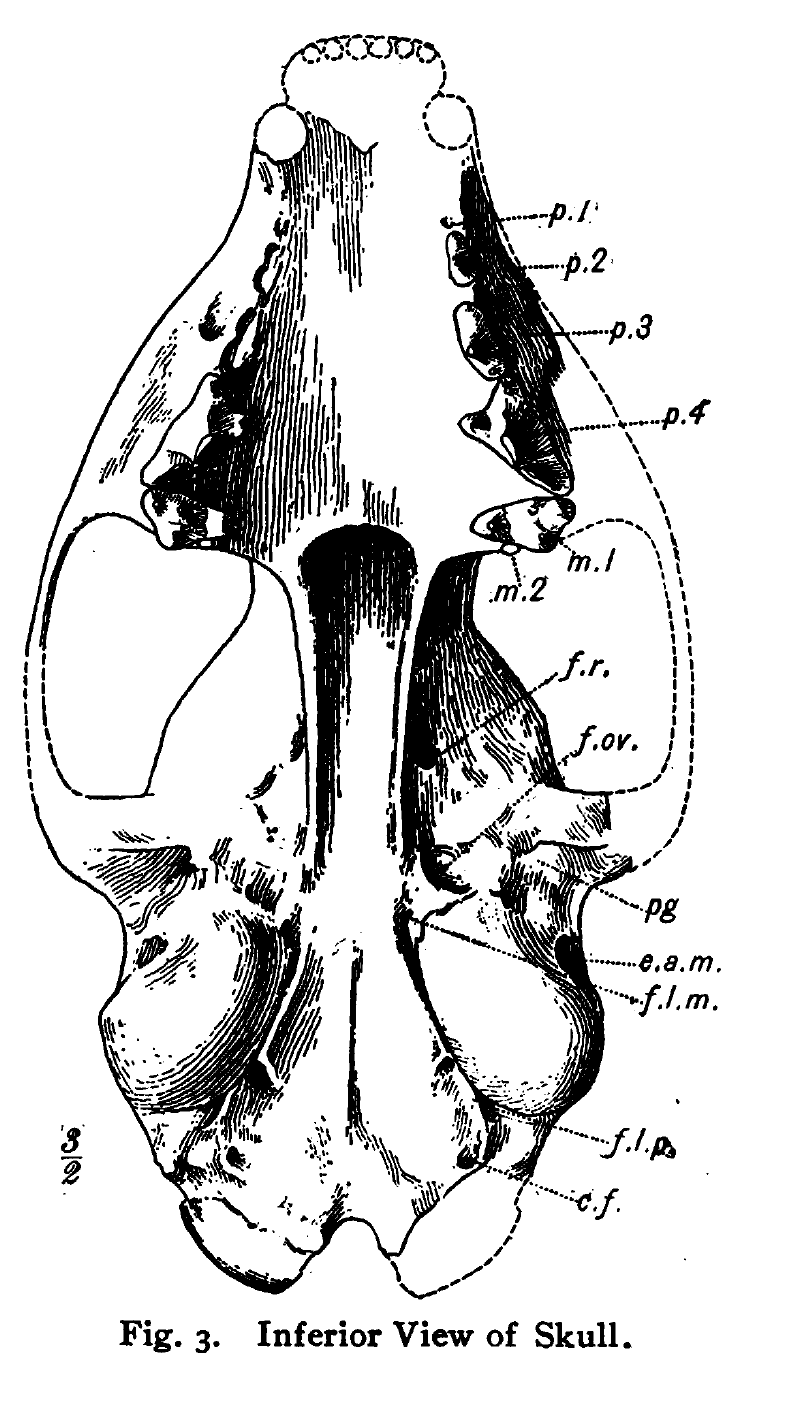
Inferior view of Bunaelurus (=Palaeogale) from Matthew 1902

Simpson 1946 wrote that when Cope 1873 described the North American species Bunaelurus lagophagus, he distinguished the genus from the European Plesiogale (=Palaeogale in part) based on differences in M_{2}. Simpson, however, thought this molar was "very closely similar" in both genera and synonymized Cope's genus with Palaeogale. Matthew 1902 described a skull which he referred to Cope's genus "Bunaelurus". The skull was found without lower jaws (on which all Bunaelurus specimens were based), but Matthew argued that the correspondence in horizon and size made the "identification reasonably safe." He nevertheless described it as a "Palaeogale with a minute second molar still retained."

De Bonis' four species
| Species | Time span | Size | Dental morphology |
|---|---|---|---|
| P. sectoria | Late Eocene, Early Oligocene | Medium | M2 and p1 retained |
| P. minuta | Late Oligocene, Early Miocene | Smallest | M2 and p1 lost |
| P. hyaenoides | Miocene | Medium | |
| P. dorothiae | Late Oligocene, Early Miocene | Largest | |

de Bonis 1981 synonymized the then described Palaeogale species from Europe and North America into four taxa based on age occurrence, size difference, presence of M2, and loss of p1. Two species from Mongolia (P. ulysses and P. parvula) described by Matthew & Granger 1924 were synonymized by Simpson 1946 who argued that the smaller individuals most likely were female and the larger male members of the same species, like in modern mustelids.

Flynn & Galiano 1982 created the infraorder Aeluroida to accommodate Palaeogale, Ictidopappus, and Feloidea and argued that these taxa share some derived dental features not present in other feliforms, and retain some primitive dental features that have been modified in other feliforms. Flynn & Galiano, however, placed Ictidopappus as incertae sedis within this infraorder, and pointed out that the grouping of Palaeogale and the Viverravidae in the superfamily Viverravoidea was a hypothetical arrangement.

Baskin 1998 accepted Palaeogale as closely related to the family Viverravidae but, because it does not share any "unambiguous synapomorphies with either Feliformia or Caniformia", should be considered incertae sedis within Carnivora (together with Stenogale, another very small carnivoran.)
