= Sivanasua =

Sivanasua Temporal range: Miocene17.2–13.8 Ma

Scientific classification
- Kingdom: Animalia
- Phylum: Chordata
- Class: Mammalia
- Order: Carnivora
- Family: †Lophocyonidae
- Genus: †Sivanasua; Pilgrim, 1932

Species
- S. antiqua Crusafont-Pairó, 1959; S. moravica Fejfar & Schmidt-Kittler, 1984; S. viverroides Schlosser, 1916

Extinct genus of carnivorous mammal

Sivanasua is an extinct genus of carnivorous mammal found across Miocene Europe including Germany, Austria, France, Spain and the Czech Republic. Like other lophocyonids, Sivanasua had unusual lophodont dentition, meaning the molars had ridges across the grinding surface of the molars, an adaptation believed to be indicative of a herbivorous diet.

== Discovery and naming ==
The first fossils of Sivanasua from Attenfeld, Germany, were interpreted by Max Schlosser in 1916 as a relative of the red panda. Schlosser named them "Aeluravus" viverroides. However, as the name was already occupied by a glirid, Pilgrim later suggested the name Sivanasua in its place. Pilgrim simultaneously named two more species from India and Pakistan, S. himalayensis and S. palaeindica. Both these species, alongside S. nagrii (named by Prasad in 1963), were later recovered as primates. Crusafont-Pairó described a species from Spain in 1959 as S. antiqua and Fejar & Schmidt-Kittler described S. moravica in 1984.

== Phylogeny ==
The exact relationship between Sivanasua and other carnivorans has long been debated, with historic hypothesis placing them within Ailuridae, Procyonidae and even Hyaenodontidae. More recent analysis of the fossil material suggest that lophocyonids were feliforms most closely related to hyenas, represented by Protictitherium in the phylogenetic tree depicted below. Within lophocyonids Sivanasua is a derived member, recovered as a sister taxon to Lophocyon by Morales et al. (2019).

- - †Protictis spp.
  - - - †Herpestides antiquus
      - - Viverra tangalunga
        - Hemigalus derbyanus
    - - †Legetetia nandii
      - - †Kichechia zamanae
        - - †Protictitherium crassum
          - - †Izmirictis cani
            - - †Euboictis aliverensis
              - - †Lophocyon spp.
                - †Sivanasua viverroides

Within the genus, S. viverroides from Central and Western Europe and S. antiqua from Spain were recovered as temporally and geographically separated sister taxa, with S. moravica being their last common ancestor.

== Paleoecology ==
The lophodont dentition observed in Sivanasua and related lophocyonids such as Izmirictis suggests adaptations towards a herbivorous lifestyle, with the microwear of the teeth being more similar to that of herbivores than obligate carnivores.
