= Stenogale =

Stenogale Temporal range: 33.9–23.03 Ma Oligocene

Scientific classification
- Domain: Eukaryota
- Kingdom: Animalia
- Phylum: Chordata
- Class: Mammalia
- Order: Carnivora
- Suborder: Feliformia
- Superfamily: Feloidea
- Genus: †Stenogale; Schlosser, 1888

Species
- †Stenogale bransatensis de Bonis et al. 1999; †Stenogale gracilis Filhol 1877; †Stenogale intermedia Filhol 1877

Extinct genus of carnivorans

Stenogale is an extinct genus of carnivorans whose fossils are found in France, Germany, and Switzerland.

== Morphology ==
The presence of accessory cusps on the premolars and other dental characters are present in stenogales, a characteristic that is shared by Barbourofelidae and Felidae.

== Taxonomy ==
Its placement in Feliformia has undergone revision since its discovery; it has been assigned to Mustelinae, Mustelidae, and Aeluroidea before its most recent assignment to Feloidea.
