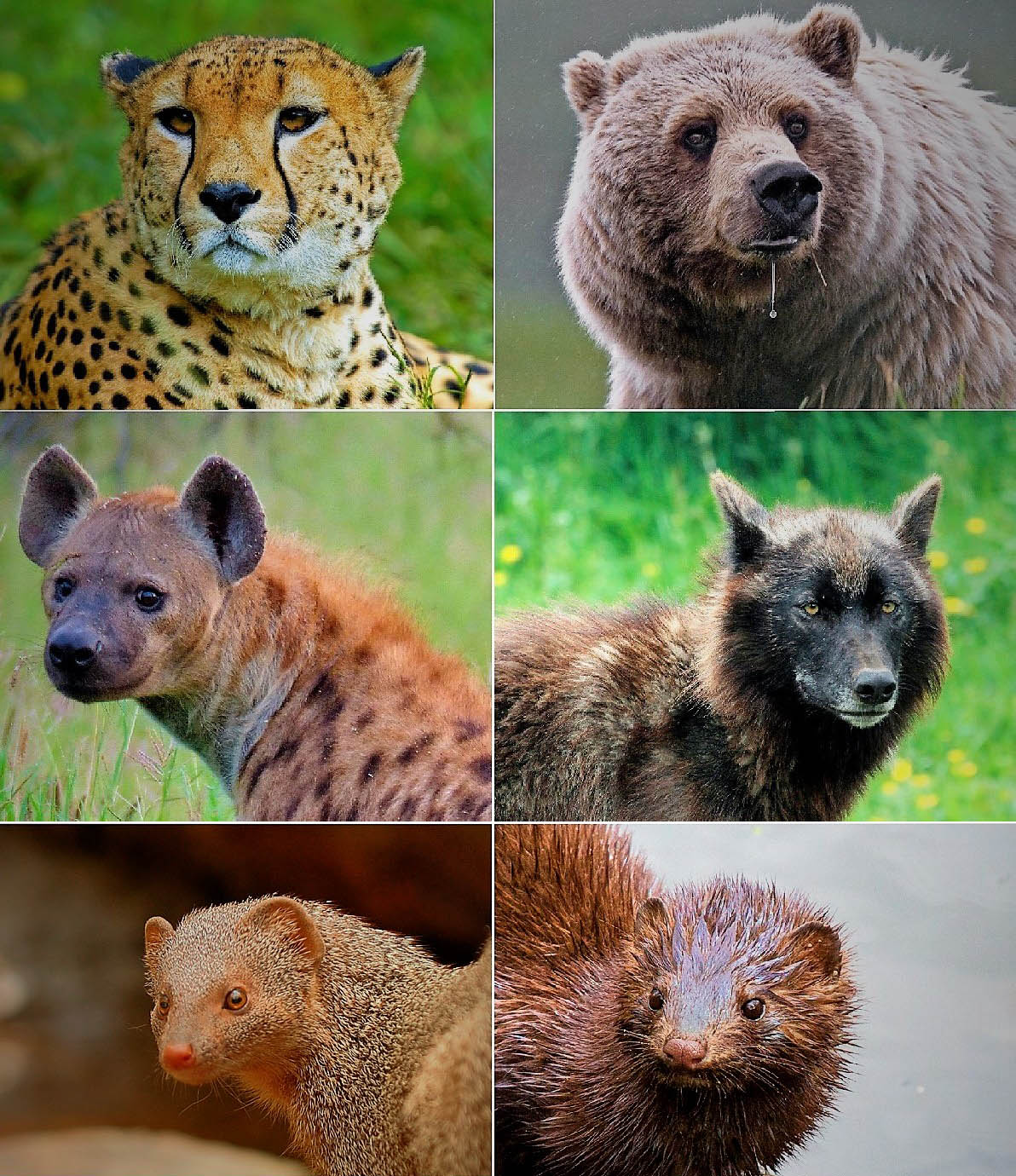

Scientific classification (obsolete)
- Kingdom: Animalia
- Phylum: Chordata
- Class: Mammalia
- Order: Carnivora
- Suborder: Fissipedia; Blumenbach, 1791

Superfamilies
- [see classification]

Synonyms
- Fissipeda (Blumenbach, 1791); Fissipedina (Pearse, 1936)

= Fissipedia =

Fissipedia Temporal range: 66.0–0 Ma early Paleocene to present

Former suborder of mammals

Fissipedia ("split feet") or land-dweling carnivorans is a former suborder and paraphyletic group of placental mammals comprising the largely land-based families of the order Carnivora. In some former taxonomic classifications, Pinnipedia was treated as an suborder in order Carnivora alongside Fissipedia and Creodonta. rather than as a subgroup of "dog-like" carnivorans.

== Classification ==
- Suborder: Fissipedia (Blumenbach, 1791) (land-dweling carnivorans)
  - Superfamily: Canoidea (Waldheim, 1817) ("dog-like" carnivorans)
    - Family: Canidae (Waldheim, 1817) [a group with dogs and amphicyonids as its members at that time]
    - Family: Mustelidae (Waldheim, 1817) [a group with weasels, ferrets, badgers, otters and skunks as its members at that time]
    - Family: Procyonidae (Gray, 1825) [a group with raccoons and red panda as its members at that time]
    - Family: Ursidae (Waldheim, 1817) (bears)
  - Superfamily: Feloidea (Waldheim, 1817) ("cat-like" carnivorans)
    - Family: Felidae (Waldheim, 1817) [a group with cats, nimravids and genus Hyainailouros as its members at that time]
    - Family: Hyaenidae (Grey, 1821) (hyenas)
    - Family: Viverridae (Grey, 1821) [a group with civets and mongooses as its members at that time]
  - Superfamily: †Miacoidea (Cope, 1880)
    - Family: †Miacidae (Cope, 1880) [a group with representatives of families Miacidae and Viverravidae as its members at that time]
