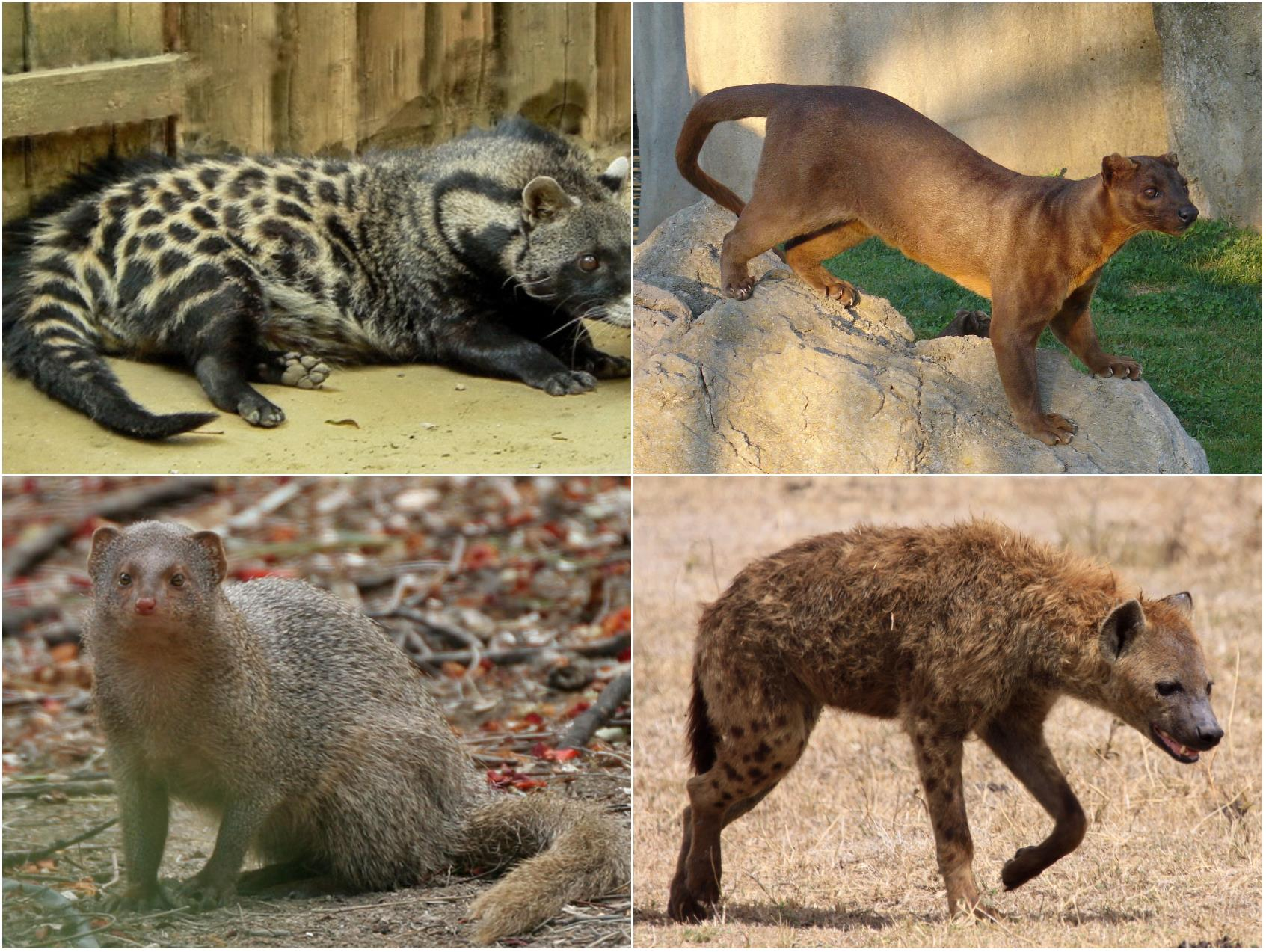

Scientific classification
- Kingdom: Animalia
- Phylum: Chordata
- Class: Mammalia
- Order: Carnivora
- Infraorder: Aeluroidea
- Parvorder: Viverroidea; Gray, 1821

Families
- See text

= Viverroidea =

Viverroids Temporal range: Late Eocene, 34–0 Ma

Infraorder of carnivores

Viverroidea is a clade within Feliformia, containing both the family Viverridae, and the superfamily Herpestoidea.

== Classification ==
- Parvorder Viverroidea
  - Family Viverridae (civets and allies)
  - Superfamily Herpestoidea
    - Family Eupleridae (Malagasy carnivorans)
    - Family Herpestidae (mongooses and allies)
    - Family Hyaenidae (hyenas and aardwolf)
    - Family †Lophocyonidae
    - Family †Percrocutidae

=== Phylogenetic tree ===
The phylogenetic relationships of Viverroidea are shown in the following cladogram:

- Viverroidea
  - Viverridae (viverrids)
  - Herpestoidea
    - sensu lato
      - Herpestidae (mongooses)
      - Eupleridae (Malagasy carnivorans)
    - Hyaenidae
      - †Lophocyonidae
      - †Percrocutidae
      - Hyaenidae (hyaenas)
