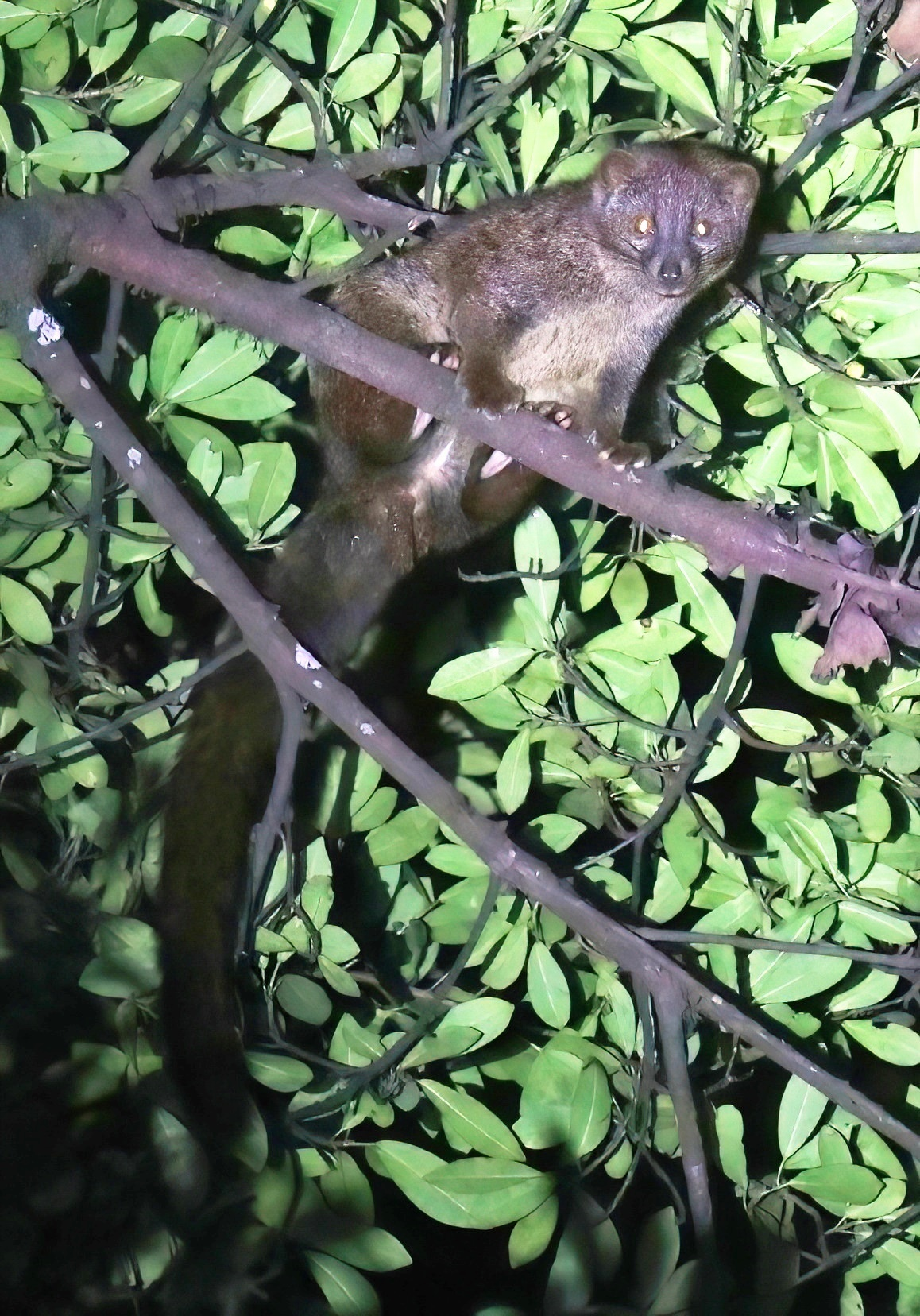
- N. b. arborea in tree canopy, Western Kenya

Conservation status
- Least Concern (IUCN 3.1)

Scientific classification
- Kingdom: Animalia
- Phylum: Chordata
- Class: Mammalia
- Order: Carnivora
- Suborder: Feliformia
- Infraorder: Aeluroidea
- Superfamily: Nandinioidea
- Family: Nandiniidae; Pocock, 1929
- Genus: Nandinia; Gray, 1843
- Species: N. binotata

Binomial name
- Nandinia binotata (Gray, 1830)
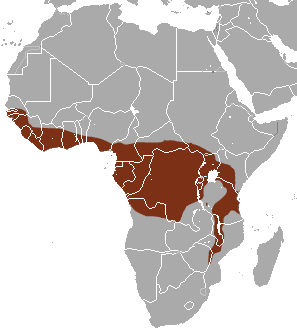
- native range

Synonyms
- Viverra binotata Gray 1830

= African palm civet =

Species of carnivore

The African palm civet (Nandinia binotata), also known as the two-spotted palm civet, is a small feliform mammal widely distributed in sub-Saharan Africa. It is listed as least concern on the IUCN Red List. It is the sole member of the superfamily Nandinioidea and the most genetically isolated carnivoran.

== Characteristics ==
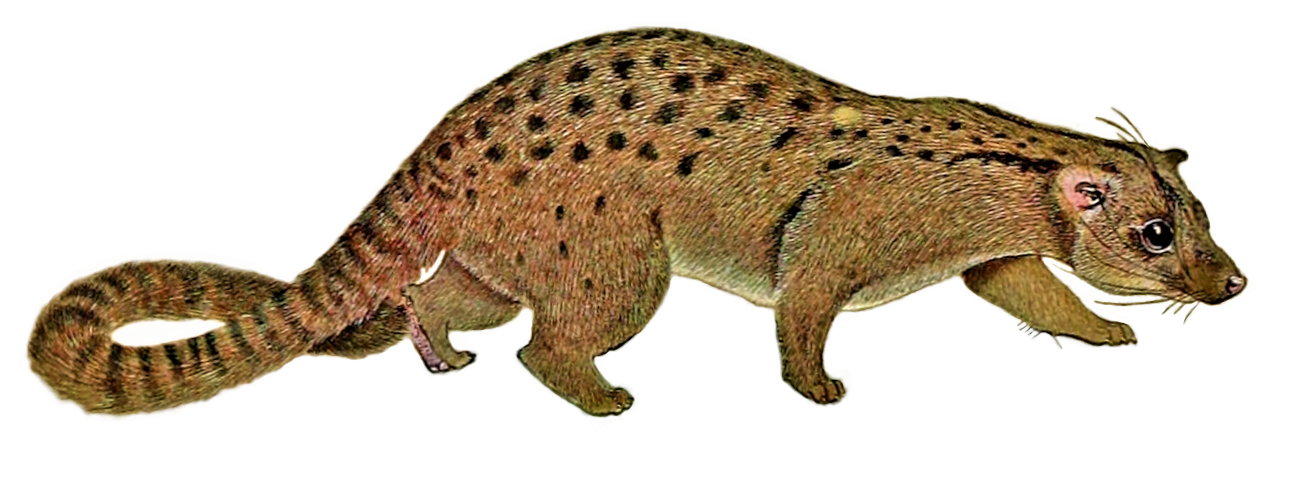
Illustration by D. R. Rosevear

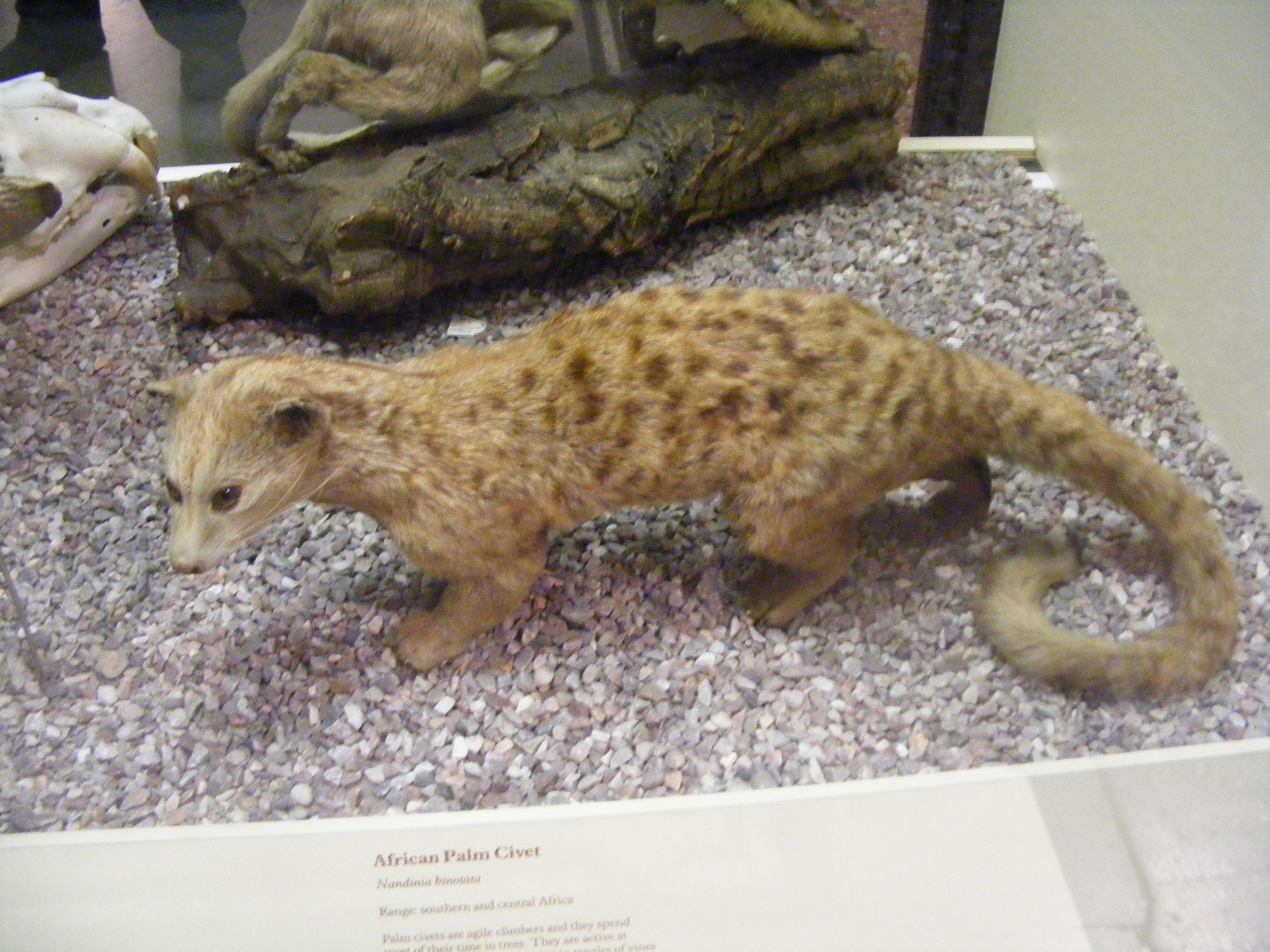
A mounted specimen in Manchester Museum

The African palm civet is grey to dark brown with dark spots on the back. It has short legs, small ears, a lean body, and a long, ringed tail. It has two sets of scent glands on the lower abdomen and between the third and fourth toes on each foot, which secrete a strong-smelling substance used to mark territory and in mating. Adult females reach a body length of 37–61 cm (15–24 in) with a 34–70 cm (13–28 in) long tail and weigh 1.2–2.7 kg (2.6–6.0 lb). Adult males reach 39.8–62.5 cm (15.7–24.6 in) in body length with a 43–76.2 cm (16.9–30.0 in) long tail and weigh 1.3–3 kg (2.9–6.6 lb).

The African palm civet's ear canal is not divided and cartilaginous at the end.

== Distribution and habitat ==
The African palm civet ranges throughout much of sub-Saharan Africa from Guinea to South Sudan, south to Angola, and into eastern Zimbabwe. It has been recorded in deciduous forests, lowland rainforests, gallery and riverine forests, savanna woodlands, and logged forests up to an elevation of 2,500 m (8,200 ft).

In the 1950s, one individual was wild-caught on Bioko Island. However, it was not recorded on the island during subsequent surveys between 1986 and 2015. In Guinea's National Park of Upper Niger, it was recorded during surveys conducted in 1996 to 1997. In Senegal, it was observed in 2000 in Niokolo-Koba National Park, which encompasses mainly open habitat dominated by grasses. In Gabon's Moukalaba-Doudou National Park, it was recorded in forested areas during a camera-trapping survey in 2012. In Batéké Plateau National Park, it was recorded only west of the Mpassa River during surveys carried out between June 2014 and May 2015. In Liberian Upper Guinean forests, it was sighted in Gbarpolu County and Bong County during surveys in 2013.

In Zanzibar, it was recorded in groundwater forest on Unguja Island in 2003.

== Behaviour and ecology ==
The African palm civet is a nocturnal, largely arboreal mammal that spends most of the time on large branches, among lianas in the canopy of trees. It eats fruits such as those of the African corkwood tree (Musanga cecropioides), Uapaca, persimmon (Diospyros hoyleana), fig trees (Ficus), papayas (Carica papaya), and bananas (Musa).

Males have home ranges of 34–153 ha (0.13–0.59 sq mi) and females of 29–70 ha (0.11–0.27 sq mi). The home range of a dominant male includes home ranges of several females.

=== Reproduction ===
In Gabon, females were recorded to give birth in the long wet season and at the onset of the dry season between September and January. The female usually gives birth after a gestation period of 2–3 months. A litter consists of up to four young that are suckled for around three months. While she has suckling young, the female's mammary glands produce an orange-yellow liquid, which discolours her abdomen and the young civets' fur. This probably discourages males from mating with nursing females. Its generation length is 7.8 years.

== Taxonomy and evolution ==
In 1830, John Edward Gray first described an African palm civet using the name Viverra binotata based on a zoological specimen obtained from a museum in Leiden.

In 1843, Gray proposed the genus Nandinia and subordinated Viverra binotata to this genus.

In 1929, Reginald Innes Pocock proposed the family Nandiniidae, with the genus Nandinia as sole member. He argued that it differs from the Aeluroidea by the structure and shape of its ear canal and mastoid part of the temporal bone.

Results of morphological and molecular genetic analyses indicate that it differs from viverrids and diverged from the Feliformia about 44.5 million years ago, It is the most genetically isolated Carnivoran, being the only species within its superfamily as a whole.

=== Phylogenetic tree ===
The phylogenetic relationships of African palm civet is shown in the following cladogram:

- Feliformia
  - - - Felidae
      - Prionodontidae
    - - - Hyaenidae
        - - Herpestidae
          - Eupleridae
      - Viverridae
  - Nandiniidae
    Nandinia

== Threats ==
The African palm civet is threatened by habitat loss and hunting for bushmeat. In 2006, an estimated more than 4,300 African palm civets are hunted yearly in the Nigerian part and around 3,300 in the Cameroon part of the Cross–Sanaga–Bioko coastal forests.

In Guinea, dead African palm civets were recorded in spring 1997 on bushmeat market in villages located in the vicinity of the National Park of Upper Niger. Dried heads of African palm civets were found in 2007 at the Bohicon and Dantokpa Markets in southern Benin, suggesting that they are used as fetish in animal rituals. The attitude of rural people in Ghana towards African palm civets is hostile; they consider them a menace to their food resources and safety of children. In Gabon, it is among the most frequently found small carnivores for sale in bushmeat markets. Upper Guinean forests in Liberia are considered a biodiversity hotspot. They have already been fragmented into two blocks. Large tracts are threatened by commercial logging and mining activities, and are converted for agricultural use including large-scale oil palm plantations in concessions obtained by a foreign company.
