= Izmirictis =

Izmirictis Temporal range: Early Miocene

Scientific classification
- Kingdom: Animalia
- Phylum: Chordata
- Class: Mammalia
- Infraclass: Placentalia
- Order: Carnivora
- Family: †Lophocyonidae
- Genus: †Izmirictis
- Species: †I. cani

Binomial name
- †Izmirictis cani Morales et al., 2019

Extinct genus of mammals

Izmirictis is an extinct lophocyonid genus that lived in Turkey during the Early Miocene. It contains the species I. cani.
