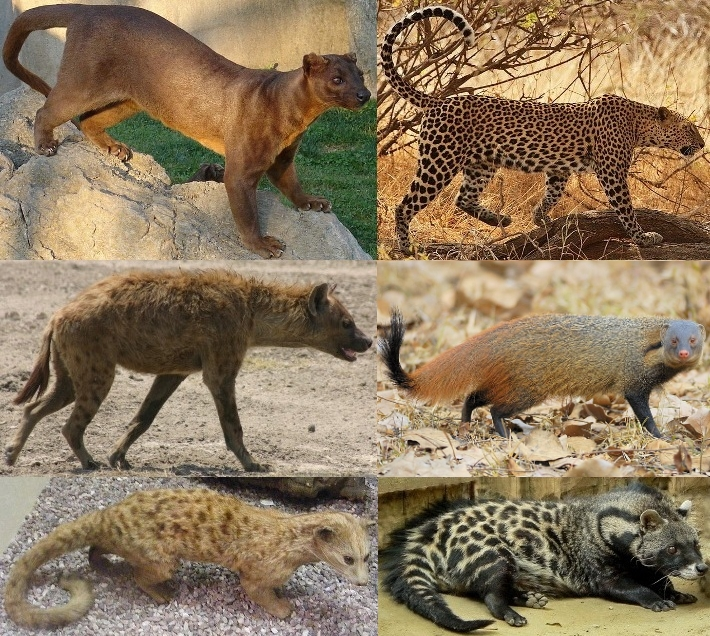

Scientific classification
- Kingdom: Animalia
- Phylum: Chordata
- Class: Mammalia
- Order: Carnivora
- Suborder: Feliformia
- Infraorder: Aeluroidea; Flower, 1869

Families
- †Stenoplesictidae; Nandinioidea; Nandiniidae; Feloidea; Felidae; Prionodontidae; Viverroidea; Viverridae; Herpestoidea; Eupleridae; Herpestidae; Hyaenidae; †Lophocyonidae; †Percrocutidae

= Aeluroidea =

Aeluroidea Temporal range: Eocene–Holocene

Clade of mammals

Aeluroidea, Ailuroidea, or Feloidea is the name of a taxon (infraorder or superfamily) comprising cat-like Carnivora. More specifically the taxon comprises:

- either cat-like Carnivora in the broader sense, i.e. it is synonymous with Feliformia (more specifically either Feliformia sensu stricto, i.e. crown Feliformia, or Feliformia sensu lato, i.e. Pan-Feliformia);
- or cat-like Carnivora in the narrower sense, i.e. it comprises only the family Felidae (recently also Prionodontidae) and its closest extinct relatives.

The Aeluroidea in the first, i.e. broader sense, has been sometimes called infraorder Aeluroida since 1982. The name Feloidea is sometimes used in a third sense—it designates the taxon corresponding to all Feliformia except the family Nandiniidae.

In the main system used here, the name Aeluroidea refers to the crown Feliformia (Feliformia sensu stricto) and has the rank of an infraorder, and Feloidea refers to the Felidae, Prionodontidae and their extinct closest relatives and has the rank of a superfamily.

== Taxonomy ==
Aeluroidea was named by William Henry Flower in 1869 as one of three sections of the fissipedal Carnivora, the other two sections being the Cynoidea and the Arctoidea. Since then, it has continued to be assigned to the Carnivora. Within Carnivora it is classified—depending on the author and the definition of the taxon (see above)—either as synonymous with Feliformia or as a part of Feliformia.

== Characteristics ==
Aeluroidea (in the sense of crown Feliformia) comprises species that are, or were, endemic to all continents except Antarctica and Australia, with domestic cats having been introduced to Australia.

Crown Feliformia (more specifically the Viverridae) are attested since the early Eocene, since about 50 million years ago; they are more frequently attested since the early Oligocene, since about 30 million years ago.
