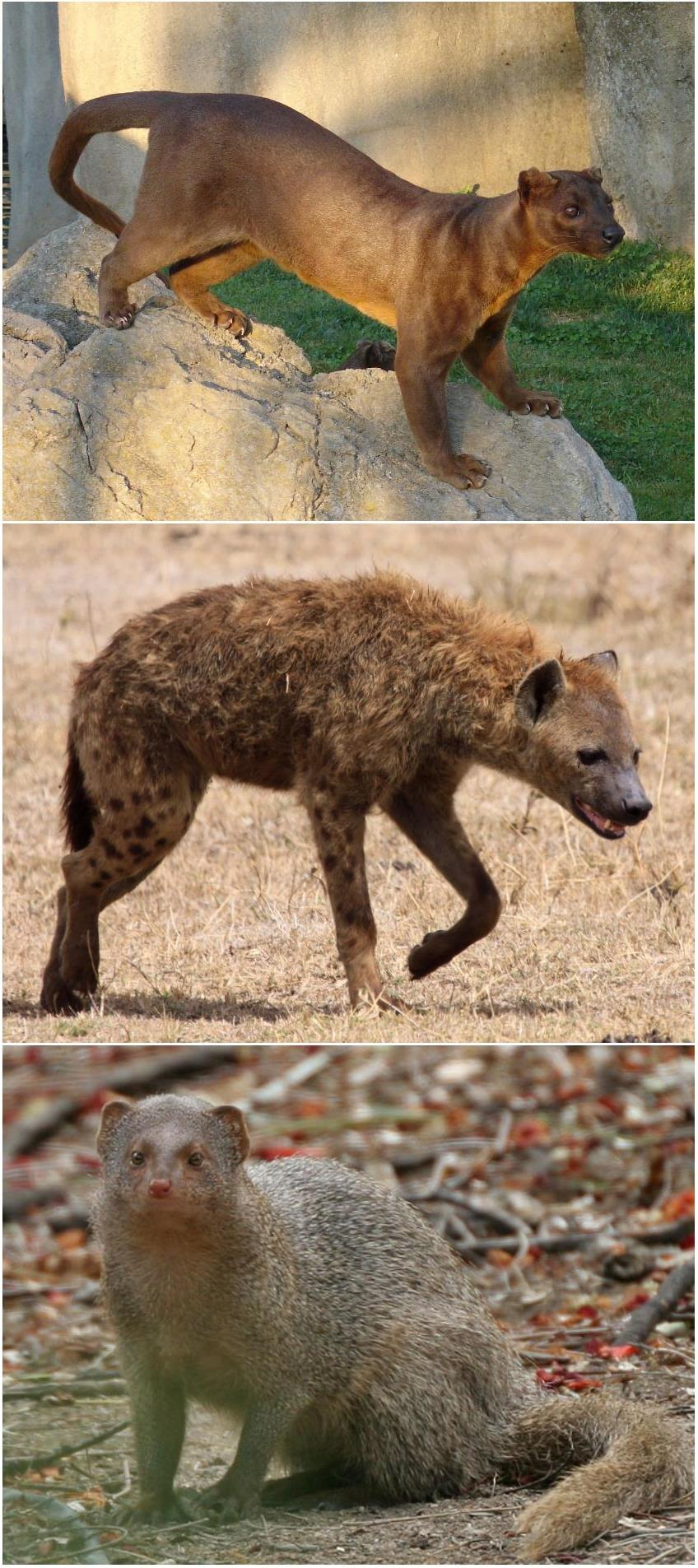
- Top to bottom: Fossa, spotted hyena, Indian grey mongoose

Scientific classification
- Kingdom: Animalia
- Phylum: Chordata
- Class: Mammalia
- Order: Carnivora
- Parvorder: Viverroidea
- Superfamily: Herpestoidea; Bonaparte, 1845

Families
- See text

Synonyms
- Hyaenoidea

= Herpestoidea =

Herpestoidea Temporal range: 29.51–0 Ma Oligocene – Present

Superfamily of mammals

Herpestoidea is a superfamily of Mammalia carnivores which includes mongooses, Malagasy carnivorans and the hyenas.

Herpestoids, with the exception of the hyenas, have a cylindrical and elongated body, which allows them to get into holes to catch prey. Herpestoids are feliforms and several of them specialize in hunting animals bigger than they are.

They live throughout Eurasia, Africa and the island of Madagascar.

== Classification ==
Superfamily Herpestoidea

- incertae sedis: family †Lophocyonidae (it probably belongs just outside Herpestoidea)
- family Eupleridae (Malagasy carnivorans)
- family Herpestidae (mongooses and allies)
- family Hyaenidae (hyenas and aardwolf) - including the former family †Percrocutidae

=== Phylogenetic tree ===
The phylogenetic relationships of Herpestoidea are shown in the following cladogram:

- Herpestoidea
  - - Herpestidae (mongoose)
    - Eupleridae (Malagasy carnivorans)
  - Hyaenidae sensu lato
    - †Percrocutidae
    - Hyaenidae (hyaenas)

The family †Lophocyonidae, which was recovered as closely related to Hyaenidae in 2019, rather seems to belong somewhere between Viverridae and Herpestoidea.
