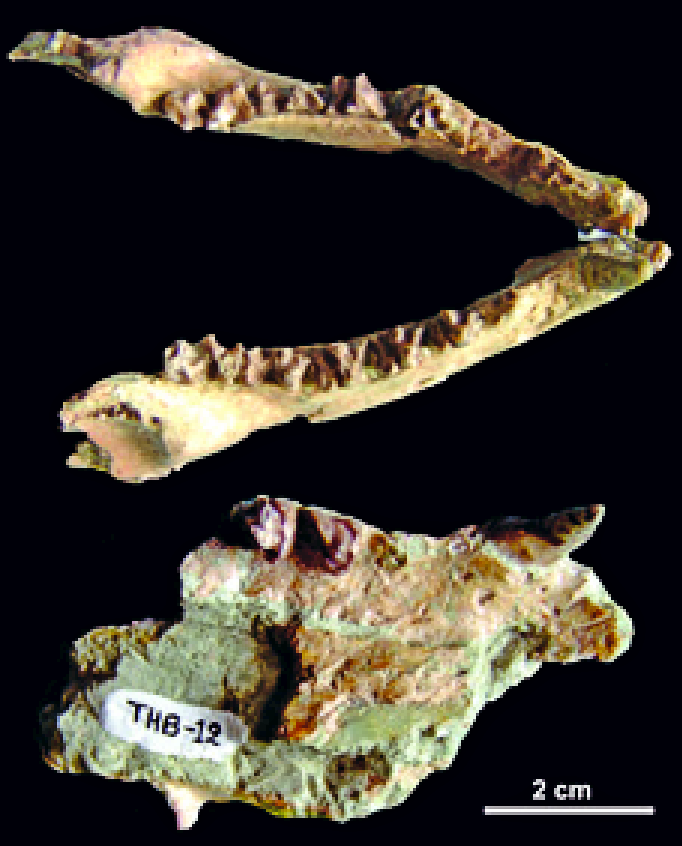
- Lophocyon paraskevaidisi

Scientific classification
- Domain: Eukaryota
- Kingdom: Animalia
- Phylum: Chordata
- Class: Mammalia
- Order: Carnivora
- Suborder: Feliformia
- Superfamily: Herpestoidea
- Family: †Lophocyonidae; Fejfar & Schmidt-Kittler, 1987

Genera
- †Euboictis; †Izmirictis; †Lophocyon; †Sivanasua

= Lophocyonidae =

Lophocyonidae Temporal range: Early Miocene–Late Miocene

Extinct family of carnivores

Lophocyonidae is an extinct family of feliform carnivorans from the Miocene of Europe.

== Taxonomy ==
=== Classification ===
Lophocyonidae was previously a subfamily of Hyaenidae, Procyonidae, or Viverridae, but Morales et al. (2019) recognized it as a distinct family in its own right. Distinguishing features of lophocyonids include the molarization of the anterior premolars (P3 and p4), the lophodont adaptation of the molar dentition and the complex morphology of the incisors.

Family †Lophocyonidae
Genus	Species	Image
†Euboictis	†E. aliverensis	
†Izmirictis	†I. cani	
†Lophocyon	†L. carpathicus; †L. paraskevaidisi	
†Sivanasua	†S. antiqua; †S. moravica; †S. viverroides	

=== Phylogenetic tree ===
The phylogenetic relationships of Lophocyonidae are shown in the following cladogram:

- Lophocyonidae
  - Izmirictis
    †Izmirictis cani
  - - Euboictis
      †Euboictis aliverensis
    - - Sivanasua
        - †Sivanasua moravica
        - - †Sivanasua antiqua
          - †Sivanasua viverroides
      - Lophocyon
        - †Lophocyon carpathicus
        - †Lophocyon paraskevaidisi
