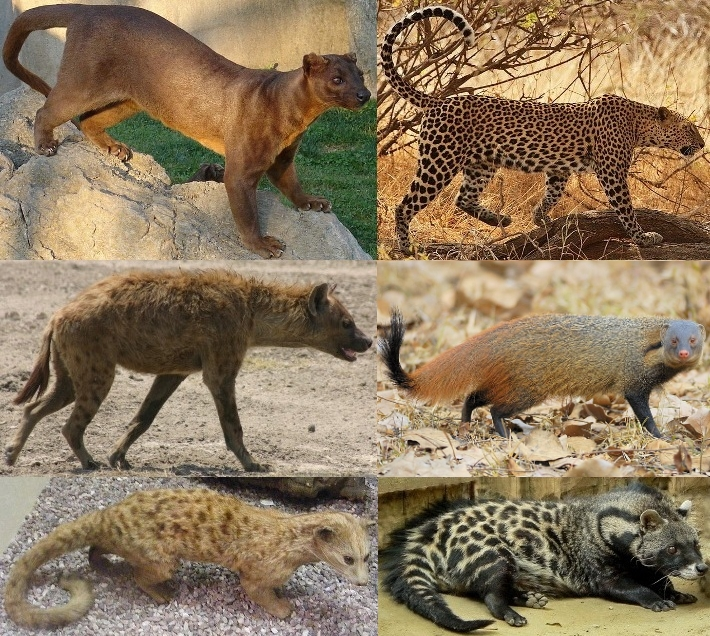
- Clockwise from top-left: fossa (family Eupleridae), leopard (family Felidae), stripe-necked mongoose (family Herpestidae), African civet (family Viverridae), two-spotted palm civet (family Nandiniidae), spotted hyena (family Hyaenidae)

Scientific classification
- Kingdom: Animalia
- Phylum: Chordata
- Class: Mammalia
- Order: Carnivora
- Suborder: Feliformia; Kretzoi, 1945

Families
- †Palaeogalidae; Superfamily: †Nimravoidea; †Nimravidae; Infraorder: Aeluroidea; †Stenoplesictidae; Superfamily Nandinioidea; Nandiniidae; Superfamily Feloidea; Felidae; Prionodontidae; Parvorder Viverroidea; Viverridae; Superfamily Herpestoidea; Eupleridae; Herpestidae; Hyaenidae; †Lophocyonidae; †Percrocutidae?

= Feliformia =

Feliforms Temporal range: 40–0 Ma Middle Eocene – Holocene

Suborder of carnivores

Feliformia is a suborder within the order Carnivora consisting of "cat-like" carnivorans, including cats, hyenas, mongooses, viverrids, and related taxa. Feliformia stands in contrast to the other suborder of Carnivora, Caniformia consisting of "dog-like" carnivorans.

The separation of the Carnivora into the broad groups of feliforms and caniforms is widely accepted, as is the assignment of the suborder rank (sometimes superfamily) to Feliformia and Caniformia.

Classifications dealing with only extant taxa include all feliforms into the Feliformia suborder, though variations exist in the definition and grouping of families and genera. Molecular phylogenetic analyses suggest that all extant Feliformia are monophyletic.

Systematic classifications dealing with both extant and extinct taxa vary more widely. Some separate the feliforms (extant and extinct) as Aeluroidea (superfamily) and Feliformia (suborder). Others include all feliforms (extant, extinct and "possible ancestors") into the Feliformia suborder. Some studies suggest this inclusion of "possible ancestors" into Feliformia (or even Carnivora) may be spurious. The extinct (†) families as reflected in the taxa chart are the least problematic in terms of their relationship with extant feliforms (with the most problematic being Nimravidae).

== Characteristics ==
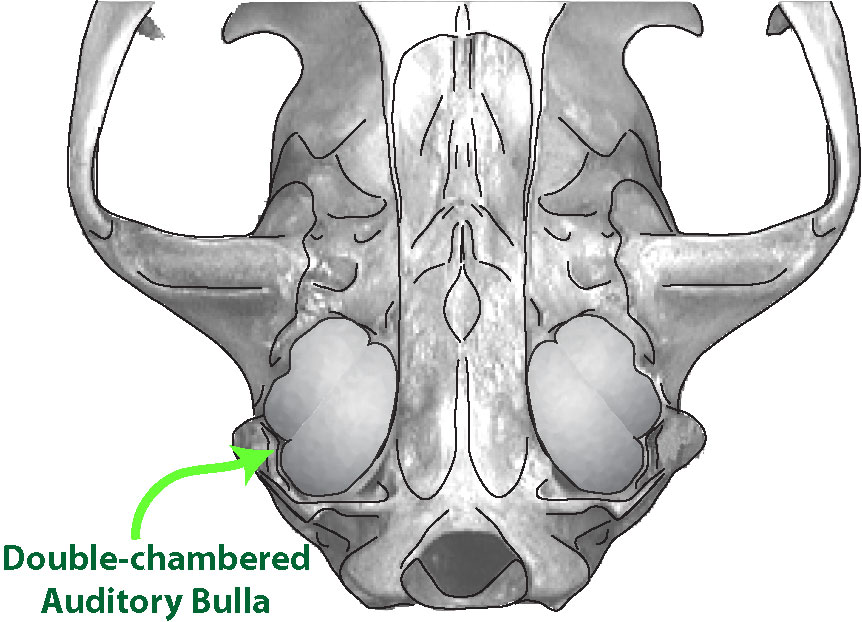
Feliformia skull showing double-chambered bullae

All extant feliforms share a common attribute: their auditory bullae (bony capsules enclosing the middle and inner ear) are double-chambered, composed of two bones joined by a septum. Caniforms have single-chambered or partially divided auditory bullae, composed of a single bone. This feature, however, is problematic for the classification of the extinct Nimravidae as feliforms. Nimravid fossils show ossified bullae with no septum, or no trace at all of the entire bulla. It is assumed that they had a cartilaginous housing of the ear mechanism.

Feliforms tend to have shorter rostrums (snouts) than caniforms, fewer teeth, and more specialized carnassials. Feliforms tend to be more carnivorous and are generally ambush hunters. Caniforms tend more toward omnivorous and opportunity-based feeding. However, omnivorous feliforms also exist, particularly in the family Viverridae.

Many feliforms have retractile or semi-retractile claws and many are arboreal or semi-arboreal. Feliforms also tend to be more digitigrade (walking on toes). Most caniforms are terrestrial and have non-retractile claws.

== Extant families ==
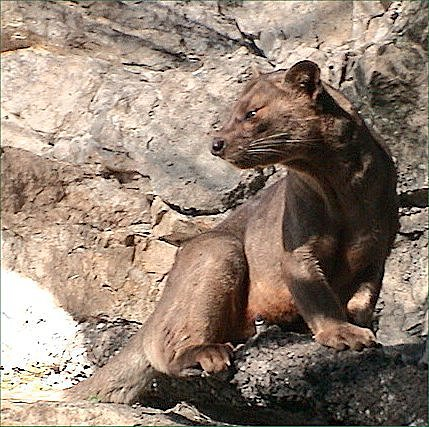
Fossa (Cryptoprocta ferox)

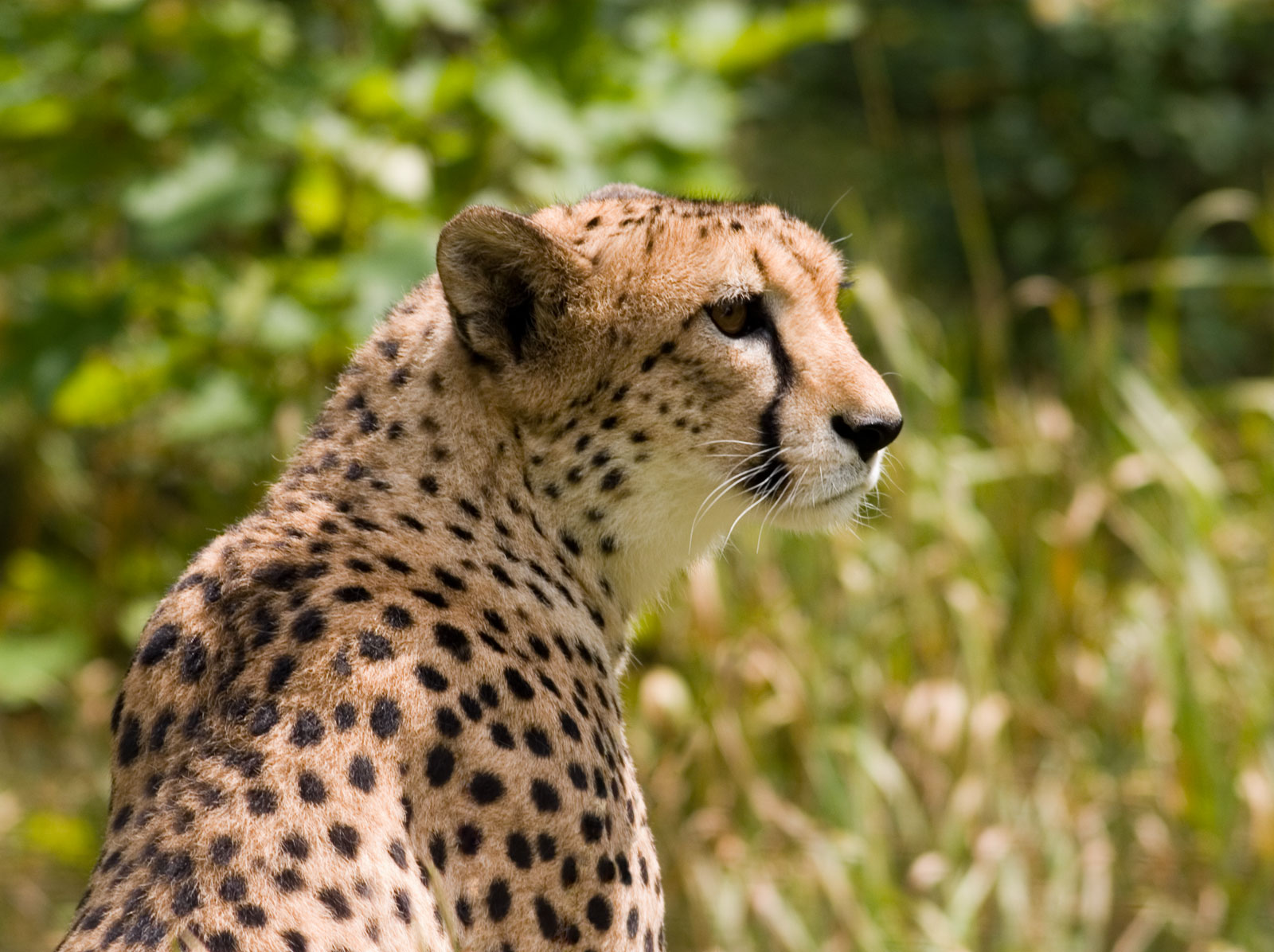
Cheetah (Acinonyx jubatus)

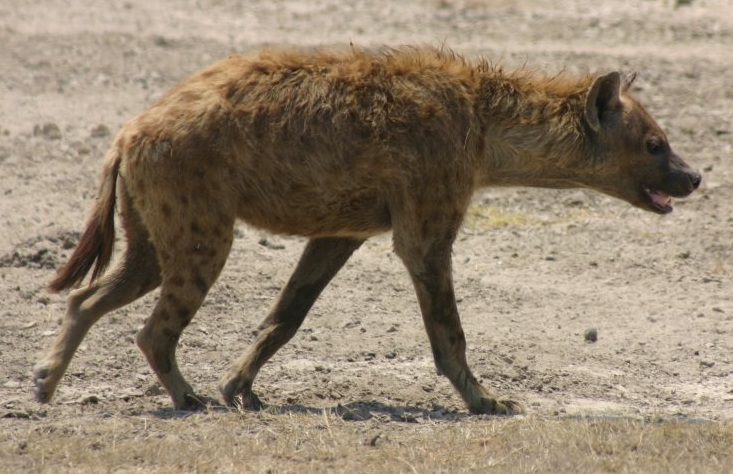
Spotted hyena (Crocuta crocuta)

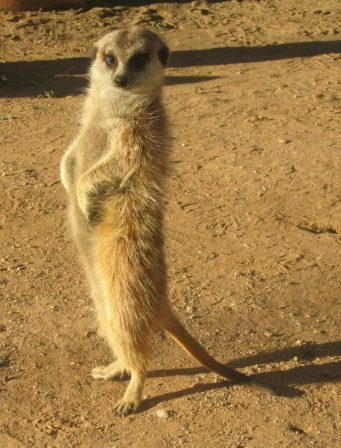
Meerkat (Suricata suricatta)

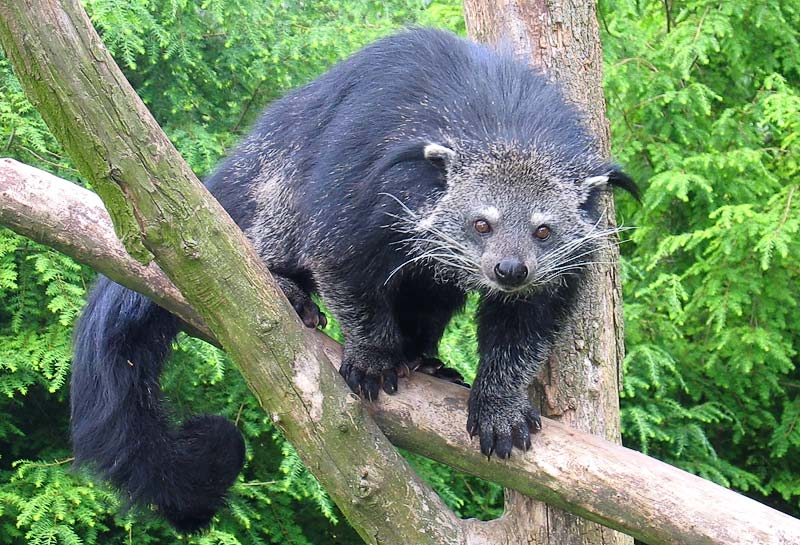
Binturong (Arctictis binturong)

Seven families are extant, with 12 subfamilies, 56 genera, and 114 species in the Feliformia suborder. They range natively across all continents except Australia and Antarctica. Most species are arboreal or semiarboreal ambush hunters. Target prey vary based on the species size and available food sources (with the larger species feeding mainly on small mammals and the smallest species feeding on insects or invertebrates).

An overview of each family is provided here. For detailed taxa and descriptions of the species in each family, follow the links to other articles and external references.

Family Eupleridae (the "Malagasy carnivorans") includes fossa, falanouc, Malagasy civet and Malagasy mongooses, all of which are restricted to the island of Madagascar. The ten species in the family exhibit significant variations in form. These differences initially led to the species in this family sharing common names with, and being placed in the different families of, apparently more similar species on the mainland (e.g. civets and mongoose). However, phylogenetic analysis of DNA provides strong evidence that all Malagasy carnivorans evolved from a single common ancestor that was a herpestid (Yoder et al. 2003). Phylogenetic analysis supports this view and places all of the Malagasy carnivorans in the family Eupleridae.

The differences in form make it difficult to concisely summarise the species in this family. The range in size is as diverse as the range in form, with smaller species at less than 500 g (1 lb) and the largest species at up to 12 kg (26 lb). Some have retractile or semi-retractile claws (the fossa and the Malagasy civet) and others do not (the falanouc and Malagasy mongooses). They all tend to have slender bodies and pointed rostra (except the fossa, which has a blunt snout). Diet varies with size and form of the species and, like their mainland counterparts, ranges from small mammals, insects and invertebrates through to crustaceans and molluscs.

Family Felidae (cats) are the most widespread of the "cat-like" carnivorans. There are 41 extant species, and all but a few have retractile claws. This family is represented on all continents except for Australia (where domestic cats have been introduced) and Antarctica. The species vary in size from the tiny black-footed cat (Felis nigripes) at only 2 kg (4.5 lb) to the tiger (Panthera tigris) at 300 kg (660 lb). Diet ranges from large to small mammals, birds and insects (depending on species size).

Family Hyaenidae (hyenas and aardwolf) has four extant species and two subspecies. All show features of convergent evolution with canids, including non-retractile claws, long muzzles, and adaptations to running for long distances. They are extant in the Middle East, India and Africa. Hyenas are large, powerful animals, up to 80 kg (176 lb) and represent one of the most prolific large carnivorans on the planet. The aardwolf is much smaller and is a specialised feeder, eating mainly harvester termites.

Family Herpestidae (mongooses, kusimanses, and the meerkat) has 32 species. Previously, these were placed in the family Viverridae. However, Wilson and Reeder (1993) established the herpestids as morphologically and genetically distinct from viverrids. They are extant in Africa, Middle East and Asia. All have non-retractile claws. They are smaller as a family, ranging from 1 kg (2.2 lb) to 5 kg (11 lb), and typically have long, slender bodies and short legs. Diet varies based on species size and available food sources, ranging from small mammals, birds to reptiles, insects and crabs. Some species are omnivorous, including fruits and tubers in their diet.

Family Nandiniidae (the African palm civet) has only one species (Nandinia binotata), extant across sub-Saharan Africa. They have retractile claws and are slender-bodied, arboreal omnivores (with fruit making up much of their diet). They are relatively small with the larger males weighing up to 5 kg (11 lb).

Family Prionodontidae (Asiatic linsangs) has two extant species in one genus. They live in Southern-East Asia. All are arboreal hypercarnivorans. They are the closest living relatives of the family Felidae.

Family Viverridae (all but two civets, genets, oyans, and the binturong) has 30 living species. They all have long bodies, short legs with retractile claws, and usually long tails. In weight, the species range from 0.5–14 kg (1.1–30.9 lb). Some occur in Southern Europe, but most in Africa and Asia. Their diet ranges from fruit and plants to insects, crustaceans and molluscs, and small mammals.

== Evolution ==
Feliform evolutionary timeline

In the Middle Palaeocene (60 million years ago), Miacoidea appears. Miacoids were a group of paraphyletic taxa believed to be basal to Carnivora. They had Carnivora-like carnassials but lacked fully ossified auditory bullae. Miacids were small arboreal carnivorans and, based on their size (roughly that of mongooses), they probably fed on insects, small mammals and birds.

The miacoids are divided into two groups: the miacids, with a full complement of molars, and the viverravines with a reduced number of molars and more specialized carnassials. These dental differences resemble the difference between Caniforms (with more teeth) and Feliforms (with fewer teeth) but the differences may not reflect evolutionary lineages. It has been thought that Viverravidae was basal to the Feliforms, but some studies suggest this is not the case.

In the Middle Eocene (about 42 mya), the miacids started to branch into two distinct groups of the order Carnivora: the Feliforms and Caniforms. The miacid precursors to the extant Feliforms remained forest-dwelling, arboreal or semi-arboreal ambush hunters, while the Caniform precursors were more mobile, opportunistic hunters. While it is clear that the first Feliforms appeared at this time, there is no clear common ancestor of the Feliform families in the fossil records. As forest dwellers, the early Feliforms were subject to more rapid decomposition in the absence of sedimentary materials, resulting in large gaps in the fossil records.

For more discussion on feliform evolution and the divergence from the caniforms, together with additional external references on this subject, see the articles on Carnivora, Miacoidea and Carnivoramorpha.

== Classification ==
- Suborder: Feliformia ("cat-like" carnivorans)
  - Family: †Nimravidae (false sabre-tooth cats)
  - Family: †Palaeogalidae
  - Infraorder: Aeluroidea
    - Family: Nandiniidae
    - Genus: †Alagtsavbaatar
    - Genus: †Anictis
    - Genus: †Asiavorator
    - Genus: †Shandgolictis
    - Superfamily: Feloidea
      - Family: Felidae (cats)
      - Family: Prionodontidae (Asiatic linsangs)
      - Genus: †Haplogale
      - Genus: †Palaeoprionodon
      - Genus: †Stenogale
      - Genus: †Stenoplesictis
      - Genus: †Viretictis
    - Parvorder: Viverroidea
      - Family: Viverridae (Viverra and allies)
      - Superfamily: Herpestoidea
        - Family: Eupleridae (Malagasy carnivorans)
        - Family: Herpestidae (mongooses and allies)
        - Family: Hyaenidae (hyenas and aardwolf)
        - Family: †Lophocyonidae
        - Family: †Percrocutidae

Family Stenoplesictidae is a polyphyletic family of extinct viverrid-like feliforms.

=== Phylogenetic tree ===
The phylogenetic relationships of feliforms are shown in the following cladogram:

- Feliformia
  - †Nimravidae (false saber-toothed cats)
  - Aeluroidea
    - Nandiniidae (African palm civet)
    - - Viverroidea
        - Viverridae (viverrids)
        - Herpestoidea
          - - Herpestidae (mongooses)
            - Eupleridae (Malagasy carnivorans)
          - - †Lophocyonidae
            - †Percrocutidae
            - Hyaenidae (hyenas)
      - Feloidea
        - - †Haplogale
          - Prionodontidae (Asiatic linsangs)
        - - †Barbourofelidae
          - - †Stenogale
            - Felidae (cats)
