= National Park of Upper Niger =

National park in Guinea

- IUCN category II (national park)
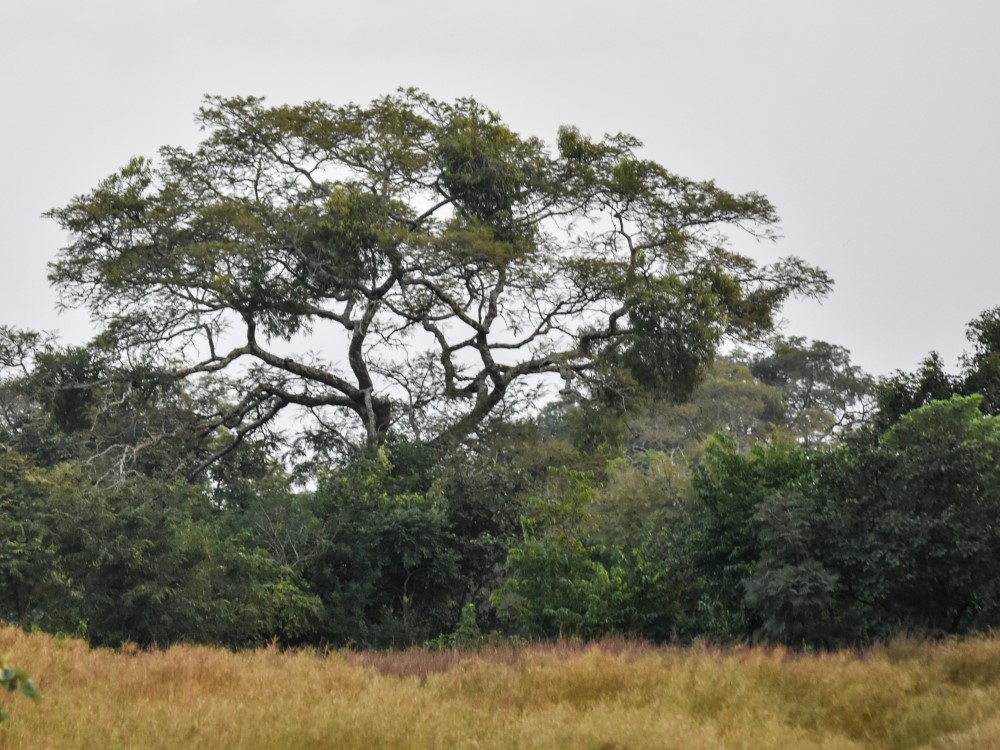

- National Park of Upper Niger (Guinea)
- Interactive map of National Park of Upper Niger
- Location: Faranah Region, Guinea
- Coordinates: 10°30′N 10°12′W
- Area: 6,000 km^{2} (2,300 sq mi)
- Established: 1997

The National Park of Upper Niger is a national park in Guinea that was gazetted in January 1997 with a core area of 554 km^{2} (214 sq mi). The park protects important tracts of forest and savannah, and is considered a conservation priority for West Africa as a whole.

== History ==
Areas of low human impact are comparatively rare now in Guinea, and found only in areas of low population density. One such area is that of the Mafou Forest, the last remaining area of dry forest in Guinea and one of the few left in West Africa. This area has a low population because of widespread river-blindness and the atrocities of Samory Touré in the latter part of the 19th century. The area has been little disturbed in the last 50 years. The park comprises two zones, a core protected zone and a buffer zone in which local people are encouraged to use the resources of the park in a sustainable way. Farming and the collection of non-timber forest products is permitted. The government manages fishing, hunting, and timber harvesting in cooperation with local communities. Since 2005, the protected area is considered a Lion Conservation Unit.

== Ecology of the park ==
The park covers several ecological zones, the dominant is that of savannah, consisting of woodland and bushland. A smaller area of the park consists of riparian forests along the Niger and Mafou Rivers. Around five percent of the park is agricultural, along the edges of the park. The park is subject to frequent fires during the dry season.

== Fauna of the park ==
Surveys in the park conducted during 1996–97 revealed a diverse mammalian fauna of 94 species including:

- 24 rodents
- 18 bats: Franquet's epauletted fruit bat (Epomops franqueti), horseshoe bat (Rhinolophus alcyone)
- 17 carnivores: Caracal (Caracal caracal), Egyptian mongoose (Herpestes ichneumon), Gambian mongoose (Mungos gambianus), spot-necked otter (Lutra maculicollis)
- 14 ungulates: giant forest hog (Hylochoerus meinertzhageni), kob (Kobus kob), waterbuck (K. ellipsiprymnus)
- nine insectivores: four-toed hedgehog (Atelerix albiventris), climbing shrew (Suncus megalura)
- seven primates: chimpanzee (Pan troglodytes), Senegal galago (Galago senegalensis)
- giant pangolin (Manis gigantea) and tree pangolin (M. tricuspis), and
- African savanna hare (Lepus victoriae).

The African elephant (Loxodonta africana) once occurred in the park but is now extinct.

African manatee (Trichechus senegalensis) has been recorded. In 1997, lion (Panthera leo) returned to the protected area, probably migrating from the Tinkisso River region.

== Threats to the park ==
There is a large trade in hunted animals from the park. At present this is carefully managed by park authorities, who feel that creating incentives for careful management of the resources is the best way to protect the forest as a whole. This is in line with current trends in community conservation.
