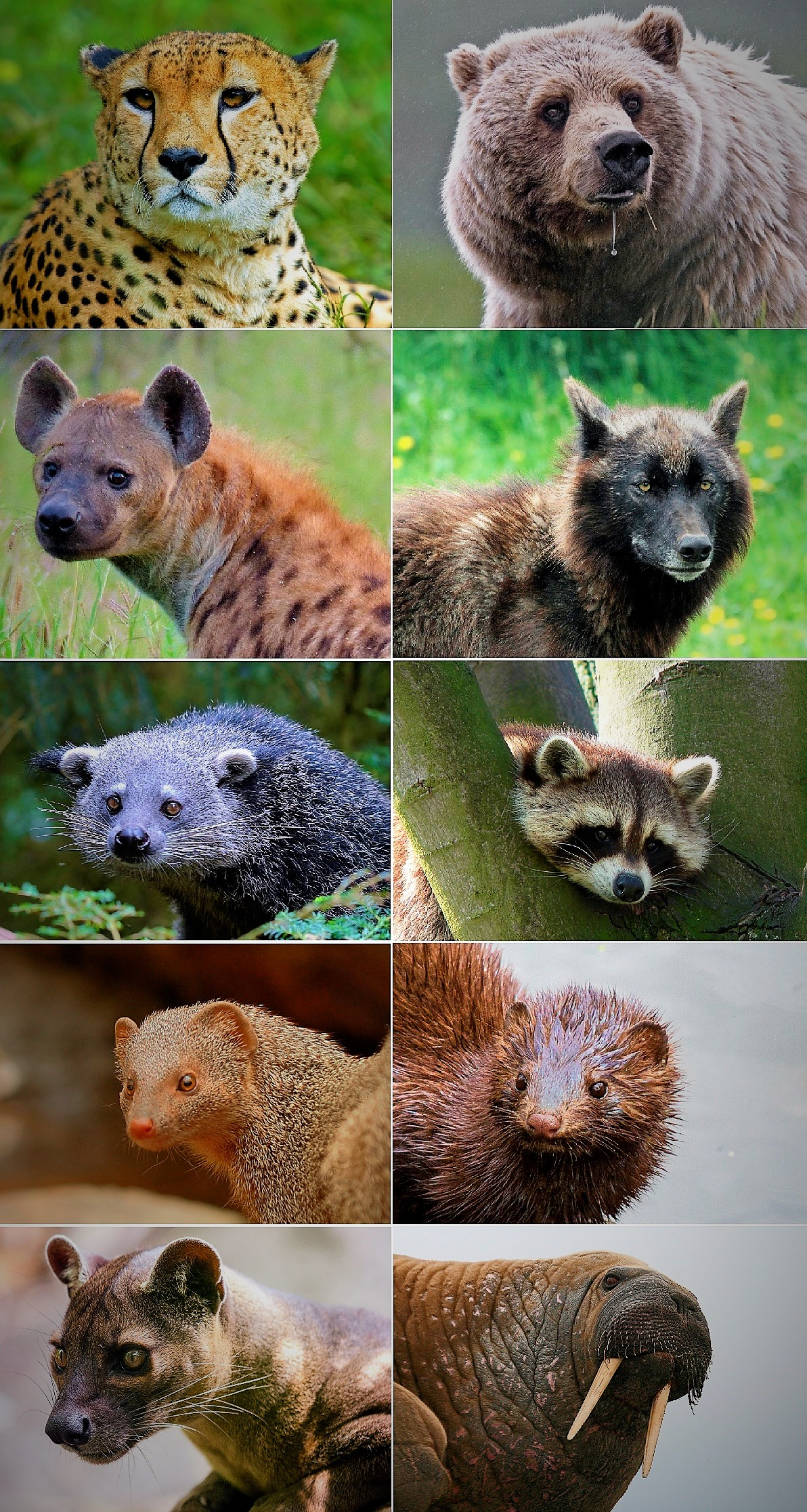
- Various carnivorans, with feliforms to the left, and caniforms to the right

Scientific classification
- Kingdom: Animalia
- Phylum: Chordata
- Class: Mammalia
- Clade: Carnivoramorpha
- Clade: Carnivoraformes
- Order: Carnivora; Bowdich, 1821

Suborders
- Caniformia; Feliformia
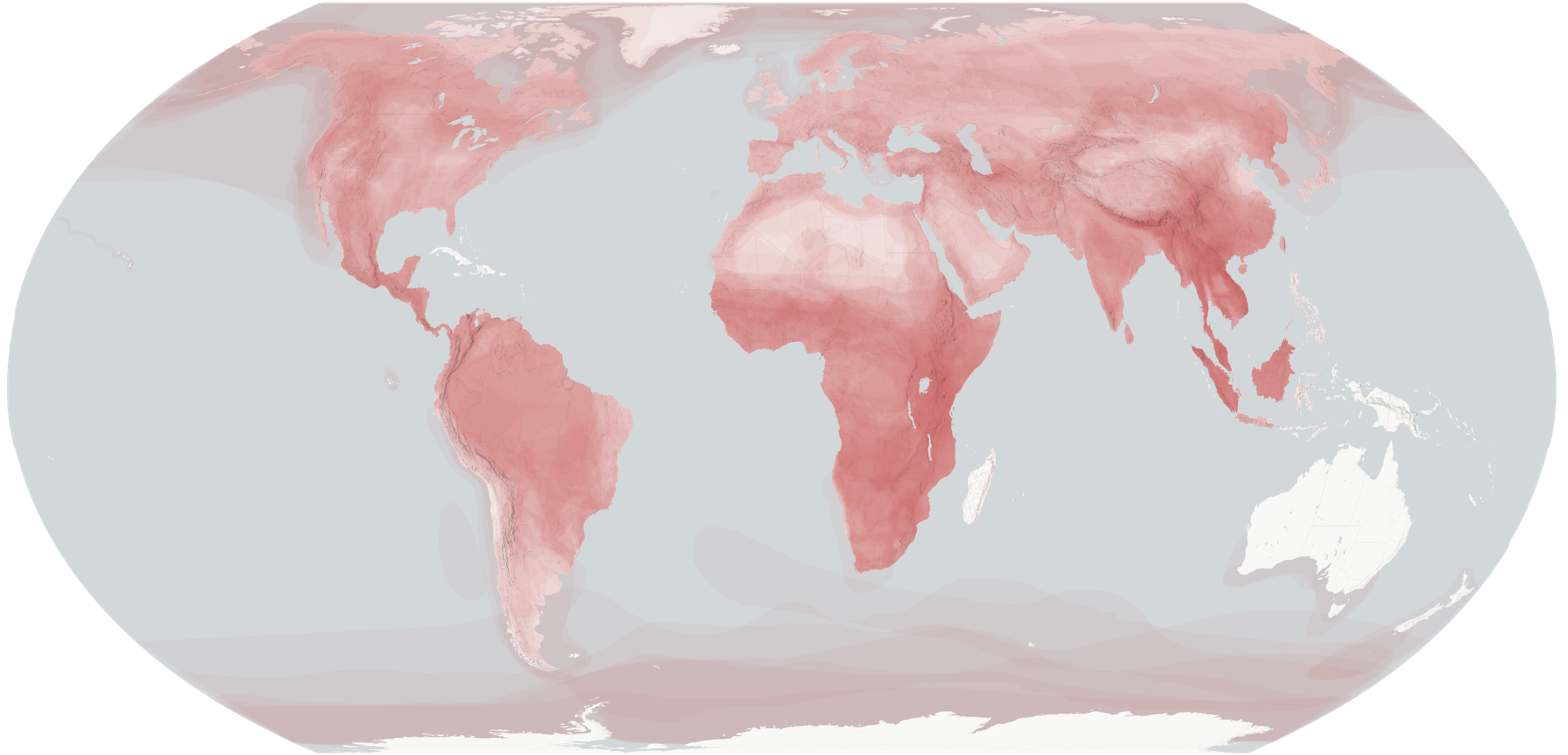
- The extant distribution and density of Carnivora species.

Synonyms
- List of synonyms: Caniformes (Zagorodniuk, 2008); Carnaria (Haeckel, 1866); Carnassidentia (Wortman, 1901); Carnivoramorphia (Kalandadze & Rautian, 1992); Carnivores (Cuvier, 1817); Carnivori (Vieq d'Azyr, 1792); Carnivorida (Pearse, 1936); Carnivoriformes (Kinman, 1994); Carnivoripedida (Vyalov, 1966); Cynofeliformia (Ginsburg, 1982); Cynofeloidea (Hough, 1953); Cynosia (Rafinesque, 1815); Digitigrada (Illiger, 1811); Digitigradae (Gray, 1821); Eucarnivora (Mekayev, 2002); Ferae (Linnaeus, 1758); Fissipeda (Blumenbach, 1791); Neocarnivora (Radinsky, 1977); Plantigrada (Illiger, 1811)

= Carnivora =

Carnivorans Temporal range: 51.88–0 Ma Early Eocene – Holocene

Order of mammals

Carnivora (/kɑːrˈnɪvərə/ kar-NIV-ər-ə) is an order of placental mammals specialised primarily in eating flesh, whose members are formally referred to as carnivorans. The order Carnivora is the sixth largest order of mammals, comprising at least 293 species. Carnivorans are found on every major landmass and in a variety of habitats, ranging from the cold polar regions of Earth to the hyper-arid region of the Sahara Desert and the open seas. Carnivorans exhibit a wide array of body plans, varying greatly in size and shape.

Carnivora are divided into two suborders, the Feliformia, containing the true felids and several "cat-like" animals; and the Caniformia, containing the true canids and many "dog-like" animals. The feliforms include the Felidae, Viverridae, hyena, and mongoose families, the majority of which live only in the Old World; cats are the only exception, entering the Americas via the Bering land bridge. The caniforms include the Caninae, Procyonidae, bears, mustelids, skunks, and pinnipeds that occur worldwide with immense diversity in their morphology, diet, and behaviour.

== Etymology ==
The word Carnivora is derived from Latin carō (stem carn-) 'flesh' and vorāre 'to devour'.

== Systematics ==
=== Evolution ===
The order Carnivora belongs to a group of mammals known as Laurasiatheria, which also includes other groups such as bats and ungulates. Within this group the carnivorans are placed in the clade Ferae. Ferae includes the closest extant relative of carnivorans, the pangolins, as well as several extinct groups of mostly Paleogene carnivorous placentals such as the creodonts, the arctocyonians, and mesonychians. The creodonts were originally thought of as the sister taxon to the carnivorans, perhaps even ancestral to, based on the presence of the carnassial teeth, but the nature of the carnassial teeth is different between the two groups. In carnivorans, the carnassials are positioned near the front of the molar row, while in the creodonts, they are positioned near the back of the molar row, and this suggests a separate evolutionary history and an order-level distinction. In addition, phylogenetic analysis suggests that creodonts are more closely related to pangolins while mesonychians might be the sister group to carnivorans and their stem-relatives.

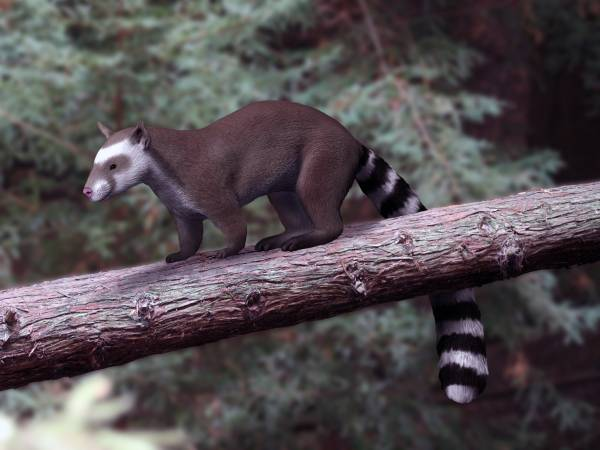
Life reconstruction of Tapocyon robustus, a species of miacid

The closest stem-carnivorans are the miacoids. The miacoids include the families Viverravidae and Miacidae, and together the Carnivora and Miacoidea form the stem-clade Carnivoramorpha. The miacoids were small, genet-like carnivoramorphs that occupy a variety of niches such as terrestrial and arboreal habitats. Studies have shown that while viverravids are a monophyletic basal group, the miacids are paraphyletic with respect to Carnivora (as shown in the phylogeny below).

Carnivoramorpha as a whole existed 6 million years after the Cretaceous–Paleogene extinction event. Crown carnivorans first appeared around 42 million years ago in the Middle Eocene. Their molecular phylogeny shows the extant Carnivora are a monophyletic group, the crown group of the Carnivoramorpha. From there carnivorans have split into two clades based on the composition of the bony structures that surround the middle ear of the skull, the cat-like feliforms and the dog-like caniforms. In feliforms, the auditory bullae are double-chambered, composed of two bones joined by a septum. Caniforms have single-chambered or partially divided auditory bullae, composed of a single bone. Initially, the early representatives of carnivorans were small as the oxyaenids and mesonychians dominated the apex predator niches during the Eocene, but in the Oligocene, carnivorans became a dominant group of apex predators with the nimravids, and by the Miocene most of the extant carnivoran families have diversified and become the primary terrestrial predators in the Northern Hemisphere.

=== Phylogeny ===
A cladogram of extant (living) Carnivora families is shown below:

- Carnivora
  - Feliformia
    - Nandiniidae (African palm civet)
    - - Viverroidea
        - Viverridae (genets and civets)
        - Herpestoidea
          - - Herpestidae (mongooses)
            - Eupleridae (Malagasy carnivorans)
          - Hyaenidae (hyenas)
      - Feloidea
        - Prionodontidae (Asiatic linsangs)
        - Felidae (cats)
  - Caniformia
    - Canidae (dogs)
    - Arctoidea
      - Ursidae (bears)
      - Mustelida
        - Pinnipedia
          - Phocidae (earless seals)
          - - Otariidae (eared seals)
            - Odobenidae (walrus)
        - Musteloidea
          - Mephitidae (skunks)
          - Ailuridae (red panda)
          - - Procyonidae (raccoons and relatives)
            - Mustelidae (weasels, badgers, otters, etc.)

=== Classification history ===
In 1758, the Swedish botanist Carl Linnaeus placed all carnivorans known at the time into the group Ferae (not to be confused with the modern concept of Ferae which also includes pangolins) in the tenth edition of his book Systema Naturae. He recognised six genera: Canis (canids and hyaenids), Phoca (pinnipeds), Felis (felids), Viverra (viverrids, herpestids, and mephitids), Mustela (non-badger mustelids), and Ursus (ursids, large species of mustelids, and procyonids). It was not until 1821 that the English writer and traveller Thomas Edward Bowdich gave the group its modern and accepted name.

Initially, the modern concept of Carnivora was divided into two suborders: the terrestrial Fissipedia and the marine Pinnipedia. Below is the classification of how the extant families were related to each other after American palaeontologist George Gaylord Simpson in 1945:

- Order Carnivora Bowdich, 1821
  - Suborder Fissipedia Blumenbach, 1791
    - Superfamily Canoidea G. Fischer de Waldheim, 1817
      - Family Canidae G. Fischer de Waldheim, 1817 – dogs
      - Family Ursidae G. Fischer de Waldheim, 1817 – bears
      - Family Procyonidae Bonaparte, 1850 – raccoons, ringtails and coatis (also included red pandas as subfamily Ailurinae, which is now treated as a family)
      - Family Mustelidae G. Fischer de Waldheim, 1817 – badgers, otters, weasels and skunks (as subfamily Mephitinae, now treated as family)
    - Superfamily Feloidea G. Fischer de Waldheim, 1817
      - Family Viverridae J. E. Gray, 1821 – civets and allies, including mongooses (now family Herpestidae), African palm civets (now family Nandiniidae) and Asiatic linsangs (now family Prionodontidae)
      - Family Hyaenidae J. E. Gray, 1821 – hyenas
      - Family Felidae G. Fischer de Waldheim, 1817 – cats
  - Suborder Pinnipedia Iliger, 1811
    - Family Otariidae J. E. Gray, 1825 – eared seals
    - Family Odobenidae J. A. Allen, 1880 – walruses
    - Family Phocidae J. E. Gray, 1821 – earless seals

Since then, however, the methods available to mammalogists to assess the phylogenetic relationships among the carnivoran families have improved, incorporating genetics, morphology and the fossil record. Research into Carnivora phylogeny since 1945 has found Fissipedia to be paraphyletic in respect to Pinnipedia, with pinnipeds being either more closely related to bears or to weasels. The small carnivoran families Viverridae, Procyonidae, and Mustelidae have been found to be polyphyletic:

- Mongooses and a handful of Malagasy endemic species are found to be in a clade with hyenas, with the Malagasy species being in their own family Eupleridae.
- The African palm civet is a basal cat-like carnivoran.
- The linsang is more closely related to cats.
- Pandas are not procyonids nor are they a natural grouping. The giant panda is a true bear while the red panda is a distinct family.
- Skunks and stink badgers are placed in their own family, and are the sister group to a clade containing Ailuridae, Procyonidae and Mustelidae sensu stricto.

=== List of extant families ===
Below is a table chart of the extant carnivoran families and number of extant species recognised by various authors of the first (2009) and fourth (2014) volumes of the Handbook of the Mammals of the World:

Carnivora Bowdich, 1821
Feliformia Kretzoi, 1945
Nandinioidea Pocock, 1929
Family	English name	Distribution	Number of extant species	Type taxon	Image figure
Nandiniidae Pocock, 1929	African palm civet	Sub-Saharan Africa	1	Nandinia binotata (J. E. Gray, 1830)	
Feloidea G. Fischer de Waldheim, 1817
Family	English name	Distribution	Number of extant species	Type taxon	Image figure
Felidae G. Fischer de Waldheim, 1817	Cats (including domestic cats, tigers, leopards, jaguars, lions, cheetahs, ocelots, etc.)	Americas, Africa, and Eurasia (introduced to Madagascar, Australasia and several islands)	41	Felis catus Linnaeus, 1758	
Prionodontidae Horsfield, 1822	Asiatic linsangs	Indomalayan realm	2	Prionodon linsang (Hardwicke, 1821)	
Viverroidea J. E. Gray, 1821
Family	English name	Distribution	Number of extant species	Type taxon	Image figure
Viverridae J. E. Gray, 1821	Civets, genets, and oyans	Southern Europe, Indomalayan realm, and Africa (introduced to Madagascar)	34	Viverra zibetha Linnaeus, 1758	
Herpestoidea Bonaparte, 1845
Family	English name	Distribution	Number of extant species	Type taxon	Image figure
Hyaenidae J. E. Gray, 1821	Hyenas	Africa, the Middle East, the Caucasus, Central Asia, and the Indian subcontinent	4	Hyaena hyaena (Linnaeus, 1758)	
Herpestidae Bonaparte, 1845	Mongooses	Iberian Peninsula, Africa, the Middle East, the Caucasus, Central Asia, and the Indomalayan realm	34	Herpestes ichneumon (Linnaeus, 1758)	
Eupleridae Chenu, 1850	Malagasy mongooses and civets	Madagascar	8	Eupleres goudotii Doyère, 1835	
Caniformia Kretzoi, 1945
Canoidea G. Fischer de Waldheim, 1817
Family	English name	Distribution	Number of extant species	Type taxon	Image figure
Canidae G. Fischer de Waldheim, 1817	Dogs (including domestic dogs, wolves, foxes, dingoes, jackals, coyotes, etc.)	Americas, Africa, and Eurasia (introduced to Madagascar, Australasia and several islands)	35	Canis familiaris Linnaeus, 1758	
Ursoidea G. Fischer de Waldheim, 1817
Family	English name	Distribution	Number of extant species	Type taxon	Image figure
Ursidae G. Fischer de Waldheim, 1817	Bears	Americas and Eurasia	8	Ursus arctos Linnaeus, 1758	
Phocoidea J. E. Gray, 1821
Family	English name	Distribution	Number of extant species	Type taxon	Image figure
Odobenidae J. A. Allen, 1880	Walruses	The North Pole in the Arctic Ocean and subarctic seas of the Northern Hemisphere	1	Odobenus rosmarus (Linnaeus, 1758)	
Otariidae J. E. Gray, 1825	Eared seals	Subpolar, temperate, and equatorial waters throughout the Pacific and Southern Oceans and the southern Indian and Atlantic Oceans	15	Otaria flavescens (Shaw, 1800)	
Phocidae J. E. Gray, 1821	Earless seals	The sea and Lake Baikal	18	Phoca vitulina Linnaeus, 1758	
Musteloidea G. Fischer de Waldheim, 1817
Family	English name	Distribution	Number of extant species	Type taxon	Image figure
Mephitidae Bonaparte, 1845	Skunks and stink badgers	Americas, western Philippines, and Indonesia and Malaysia	12	Mephitis mephitis (Schreber, 1776)	
Ailuridae J. E. Gray, 1843	Red panda	Eastern Himalayas and southwestern China	1	Ailurus fulgens F. Cuvier, 1825	
Procyonidae J. E. Gray, 1825	Raccoons, olingos, ringtails, coatis, cacomistles, and kinkajous	Americas (introduced to Europe, the Caucasus, and Japan)	12	Procyon lotor (Linnaeus, 1758)	
Mustelidae G. Fischer de Waldheim, 1817	Weasels, otters, wolverines, polecats, badgers, martens, and grisons	Americas, Africa, and Eurasia (introduced to Australasia and several islands)	57	Mustela erminea Linnaeus, 1758	

== Anatomy ==
=== Skull ===
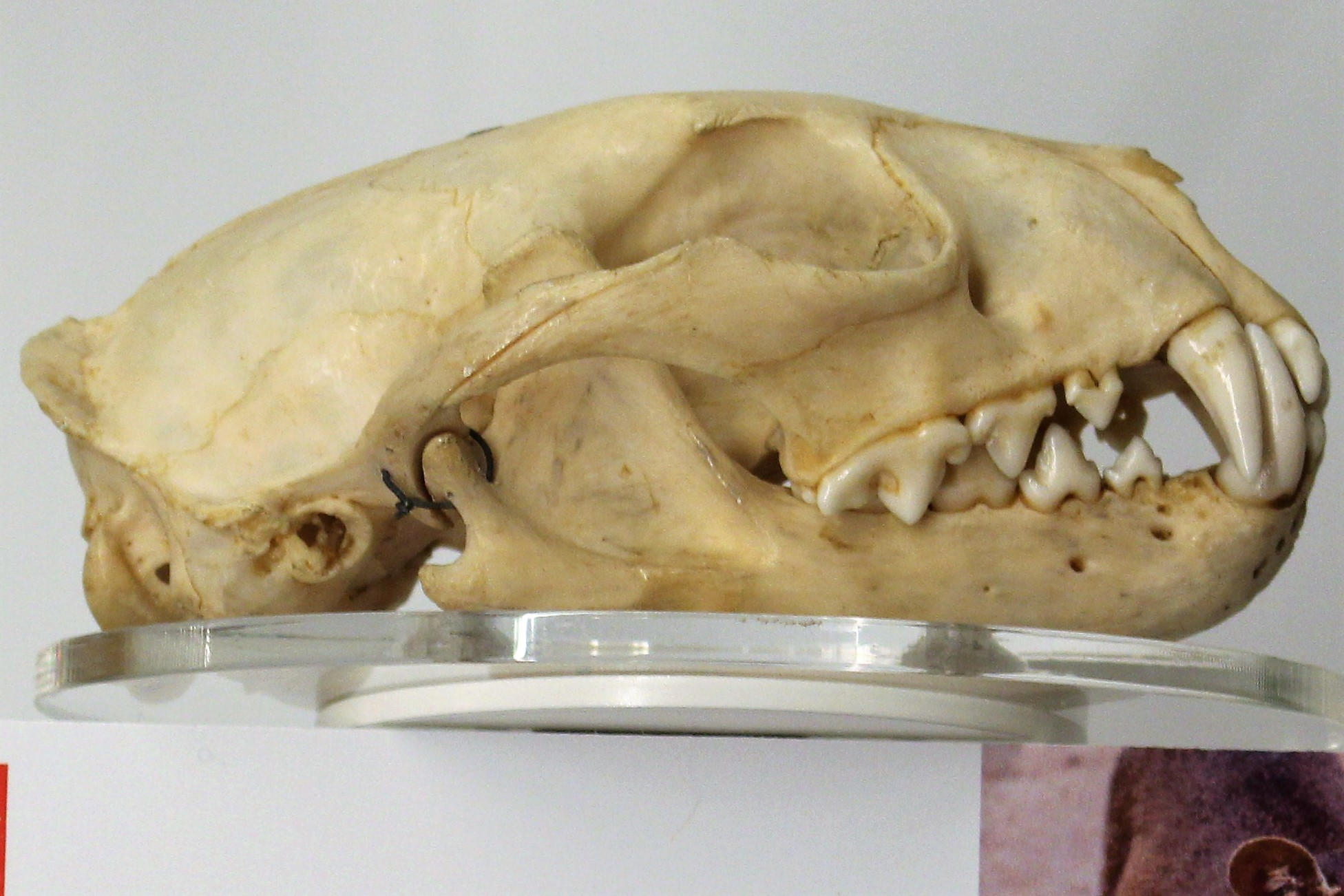
Skull of a fossa (Cryptoprocta ferox). Note the large and conical canine and carnassial teeth common in feliforms.

The canine teeth are usually large, conical, thick and stress resistant. All of the terrestrial species of carnivorans have three incisors on each side of each jaw (the exception is the sea otter (Enhydra lutris) which only has two lower incisor teeth). The third molar has been lost. The carnassial pair is made up of the fourth upper premolar and the first lower molar teeth. Like most mammals, the dentition is heterodont, though in some species, such as the aardwolf (Proteles cristata), the teeth have been greatly reduced and the cheek teeth are specialised for eating insects. In pinnipeds, the teeth are homodont as they have evolved to grasp or catch fish, and the cheek teeth are often lost. In bears and raccoons, the carnassial pair is secondarily reduced. The skulls are heavily built with a strong zygomatic arch. Often a sagittal crest is present, sometimes more evident in sexually dimorphic species such as sea lions and fur seals, though it has also been greatly reduced in some small carnivorans. The braincase is enlarged with the frontoparietal bone at the front. In most species, the eyes are at the front of the face. In caniforms, the rostrum is usually long with many teeth, while in feliforms it is shorter with fewer teeth. The carnassial teeth of feliforms are generally more sectional than those of caniforms.

The turbinates are large and complex in comparison to other mammals, providing a large surface area for olfactory receptors.

=== Postcranial region ===
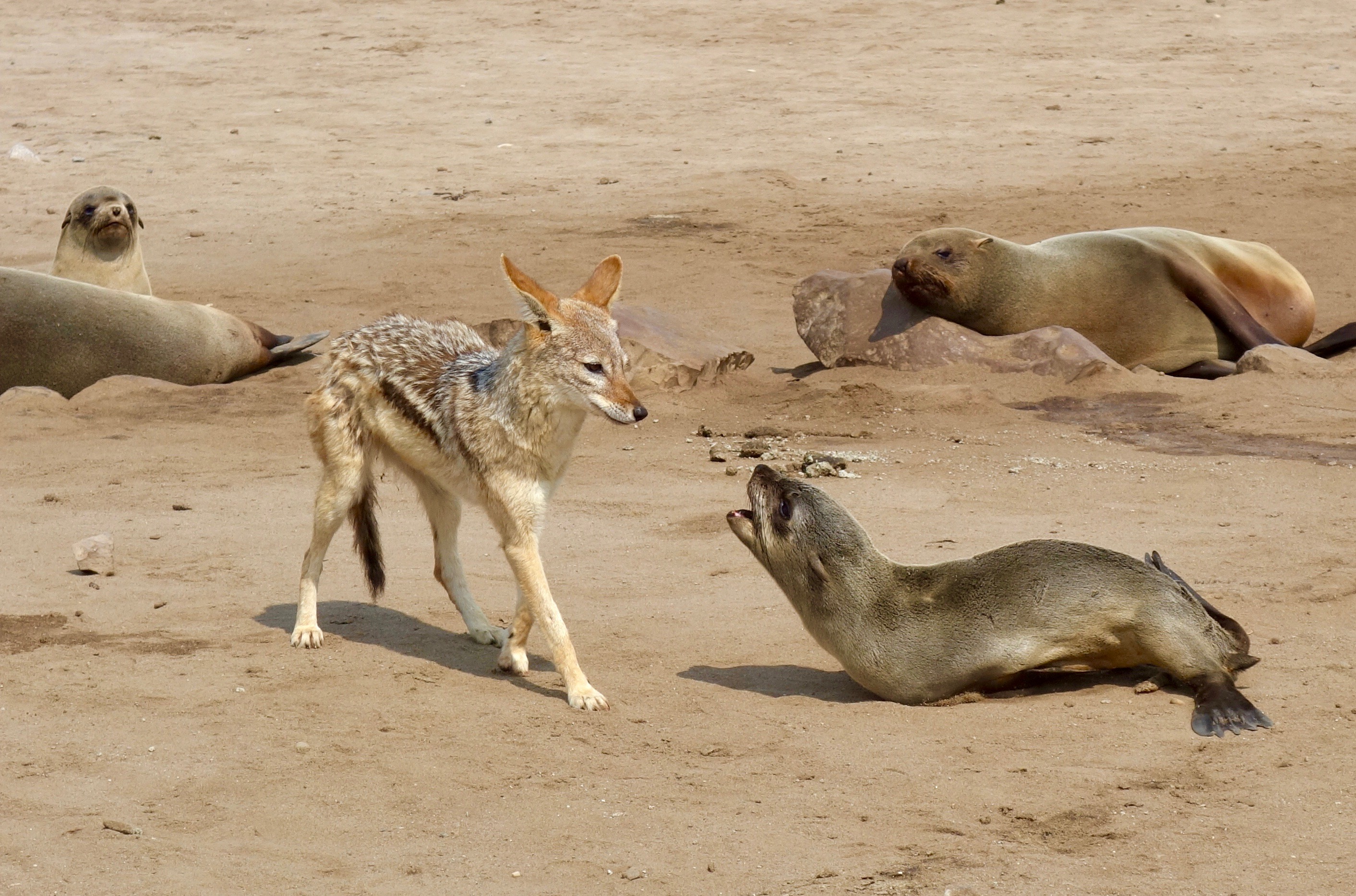
A black-backed jackal (Lupulella mesomelas) trying to predate on a brown fur seal (Arctocephalus pusillus) pup. These two species illustrate the diversity in bodyplan seen among carnivorans, especially between pinnipeds and their terrestrial relatives.

Aside from an accumulation of characteristics in the dental and cranial features, not much of their overall anatomy unites carnivorans as a group. All species of carnivorans are quadrupedal and most have five digits on the front feet and four digits on the back feet. In terrestrial carnivorans, the feet have soft pads. The feet can either be digitigrade as seen in cats, hyenas, and dogs or plantigrade as seen in bears, skunks, raccoons, weasels, civets, and mongooses. In pinnipeds, the limbs have been modified into flippers.

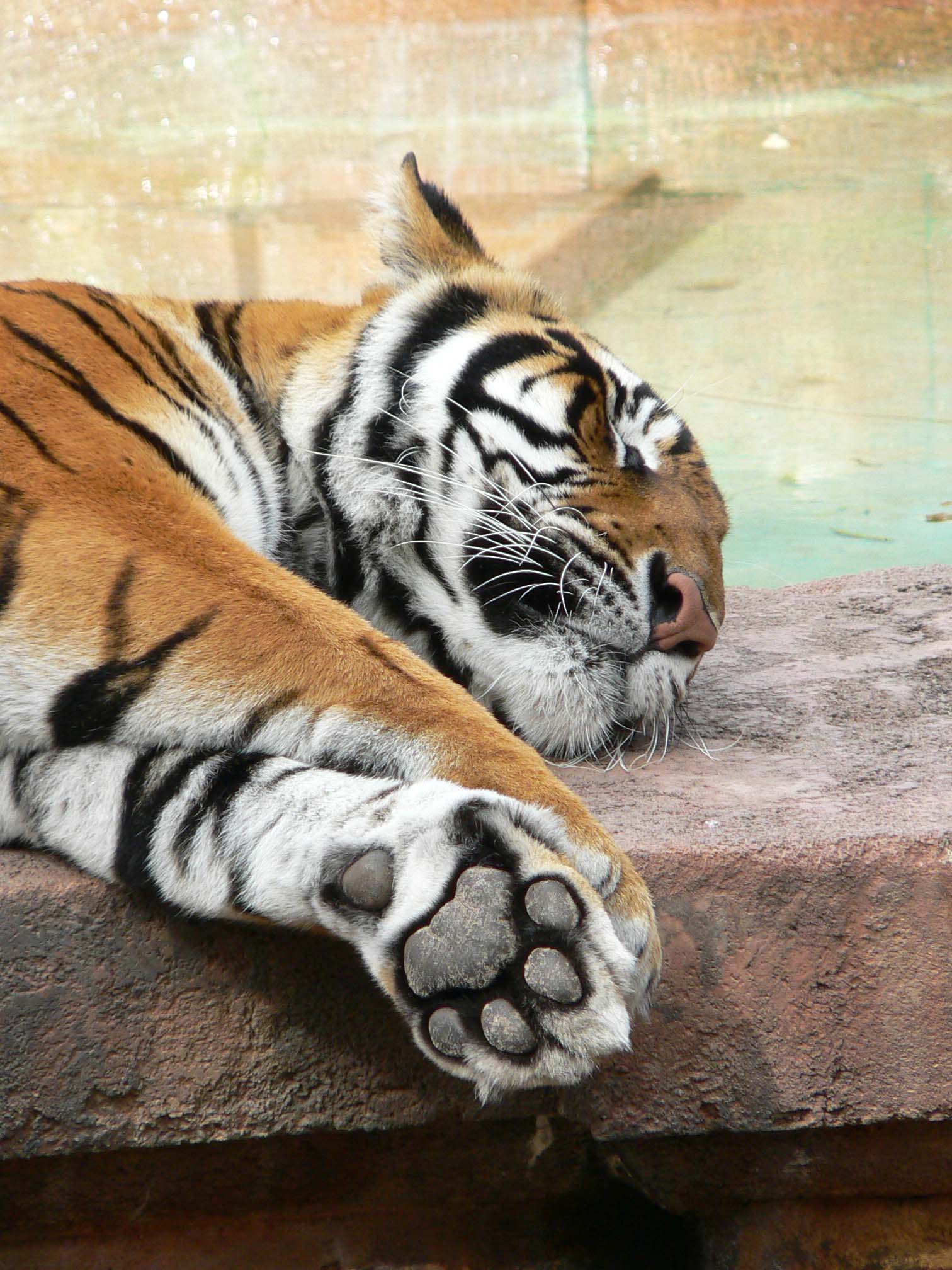
Members of the Carnivora order, like this tiger, have pads on their feet.

Unlike cetaceans and sirenians, which have fully functional tails to help them swim, pinnipeds use their limbs underwater to swim. Earless seals use their back flippers; sea lions and fur seals use their front flippers, and the walrus uses all of its limbs. As a result, pinnipeds have significantly shorter tails than other carnivorans.

Aside from the pinnipeds, dogs, bears, hyenas, and cats all have distinct and recognisable appearances. Dogs are usually cursorial mammals and are gracile in appearance, often relying on their teeth to hold prey; bears are much larger and rely on their physical strength to forage for food. Compared to dogs and bears, cats have longer and stronger forelimbs armed with retractable claws to hold on to prey. Hyenas are dog-like feliforms that have sloping backs due to their front legs being longer than their hind legs. The raccoon family and red panda are small, bear-like carnivorans with long tails. The other small carnivoran families Nandiniidae, Prionodontidae, Viverridae, Herpestidae, Eupleridae, Mephitidae, and Mustelidae have through convergent evolution maintained the small, ancestral appearance of the miacoids, though there is some variation seen such as the robust and stout physicality of badgers and the wolverine (Gulo gulo).

Most carnivoran species have a well-defined breeding season. Male carnivorans will usually have bacula, which are absent in hyenas and binturongs.

The length and density of the fur can vary depending on the environment that the species inhabits. In warm climate species, the fur is often short in length and lighter. In cold climate species, the fur can be either dense or long, often with an oily substance that helps to retain heat. The pelage colouration differs between species, often including black, white, orange, yellow, red, and many shades of grey and brown. Some are striped, spotted, blotched, banded, or otherwise boldly patterned. There may be a correlation between habitat and colour pattern; for example, spotted or banded species tend to be found in heavily forested environments. Some species like the grey wolf are polymorphic with different individual having different coat colours. The arctic fox (Vulpes lagopus) and the stoat (Mustela erminea) have fur that changes from white and dense in the winter to brown and sparse in the summer. In pinnipeds and polar bears, a thick insulating layer of blubber helps maintain their body temperature.

== Sexual dimorphism ==
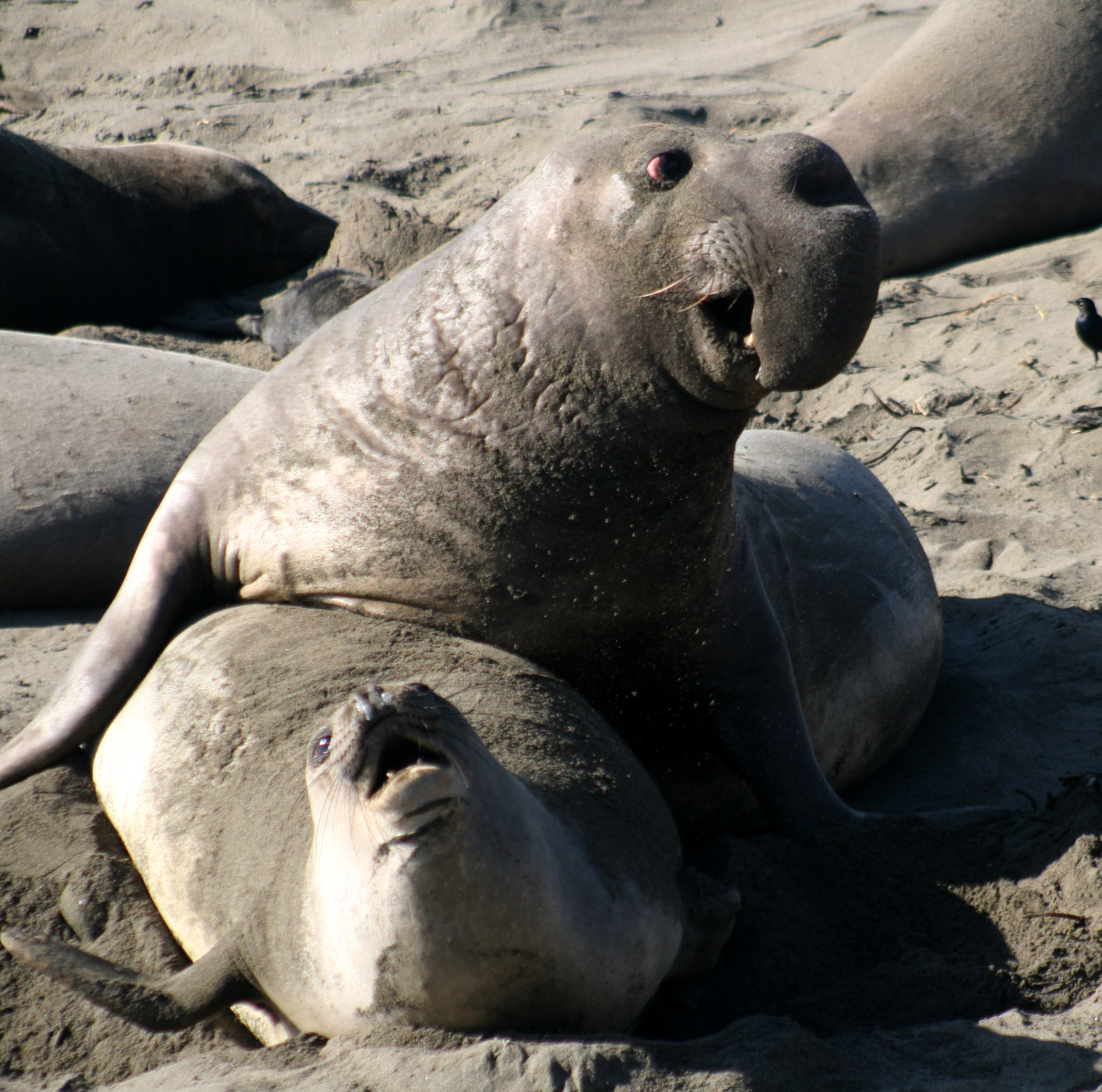
Sexual dimorphism in elephant seals

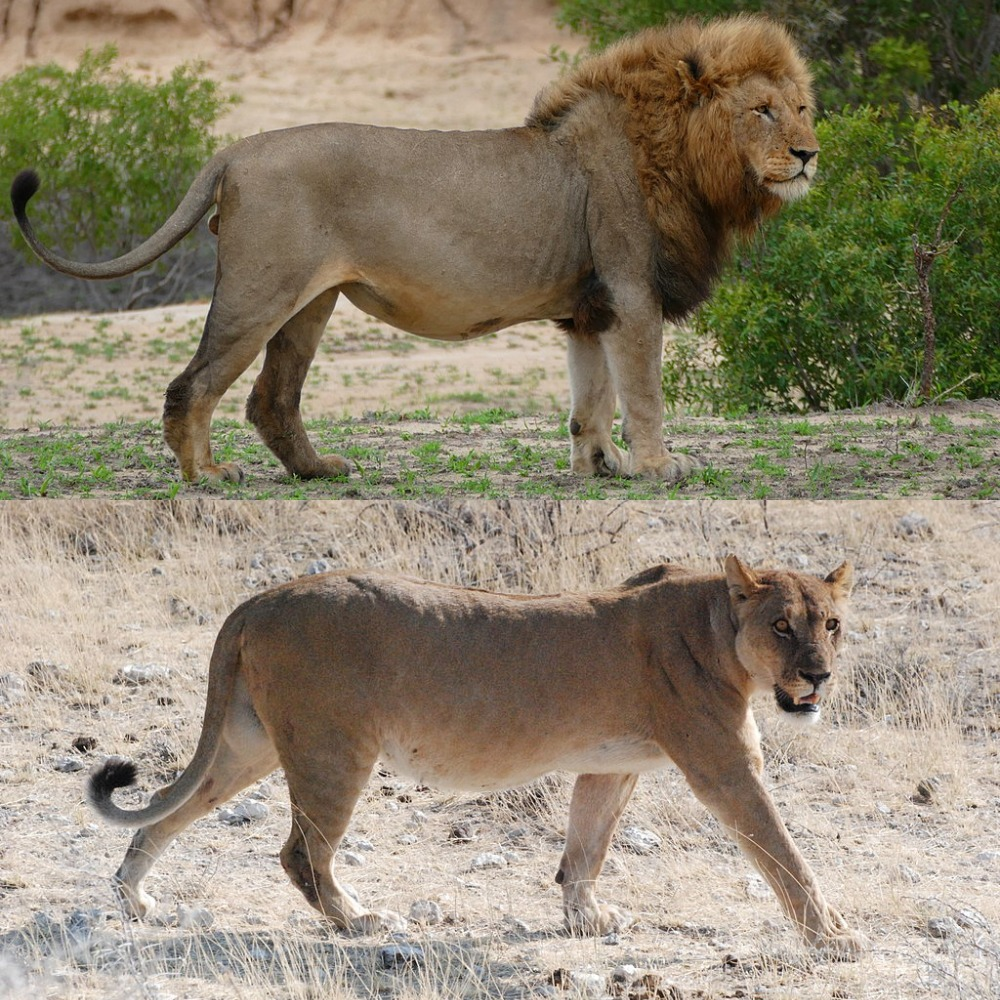
Sexual dimorphism in lions

Sexual dimorphism is the condition where sexes of the same species exhibit different morphological characteristics, particularly characteristics not directly involved in reproduction. Male carnivorans are typically larger than their female counterparts and it is thought that larger males have more success passing on their genes.

== Relationship with humans ==
Carnivorans are arguably the group of mammals of most interest to humans. The dog is noteworthy for not only being the first species of carnivoran to be domesticated, but also the first species of any taxon. In the last 10,000 to 12,000 years, humans have selectively bred dogs for a variety of different tasks and today there are well over 400 breeds. The cat is another domesticated carnivoran. Many other species are popular, and they are often charismatic megafauna. Many civilisations have incorporated a species of carnivoran into their culture: a prominent example is the lion, viewed as a symbol of power and royalty in many societies. Yet many species such as wolves and the big cats have been broadly hunted, resulting in extirpation in some areas. Habitat loss and human encroachment as well as climate change have been the primary cause of many species going into decline. Four species of carnivorans have gone extinct since the 1600s: Falkland Island wolf (Dusicyon australis) in 1876; the sea mink (Neogale macrodon) in 1894; the Japanese sea lion (Zalophus japonicus) in 1951 and the Caribbean monk seal (Neomonachus tropicalis) in 1952. Some species such as the red fox (Vulpes vulpes) and stoat (Mustela erminea) have been introduced to Australasia and have caused many native species to become endangered or even extinct.

== See also ==
- Mammal classification
- Carnivoraformes
- List of carnivorans
- List of carnivorans by population
