= Visa policy of Vietnam =

Policy on permits required to enter Vietnam

Visitors to Vietnam must obtain an e-Visa unless they are citizens of one of the visa-exempt countries.

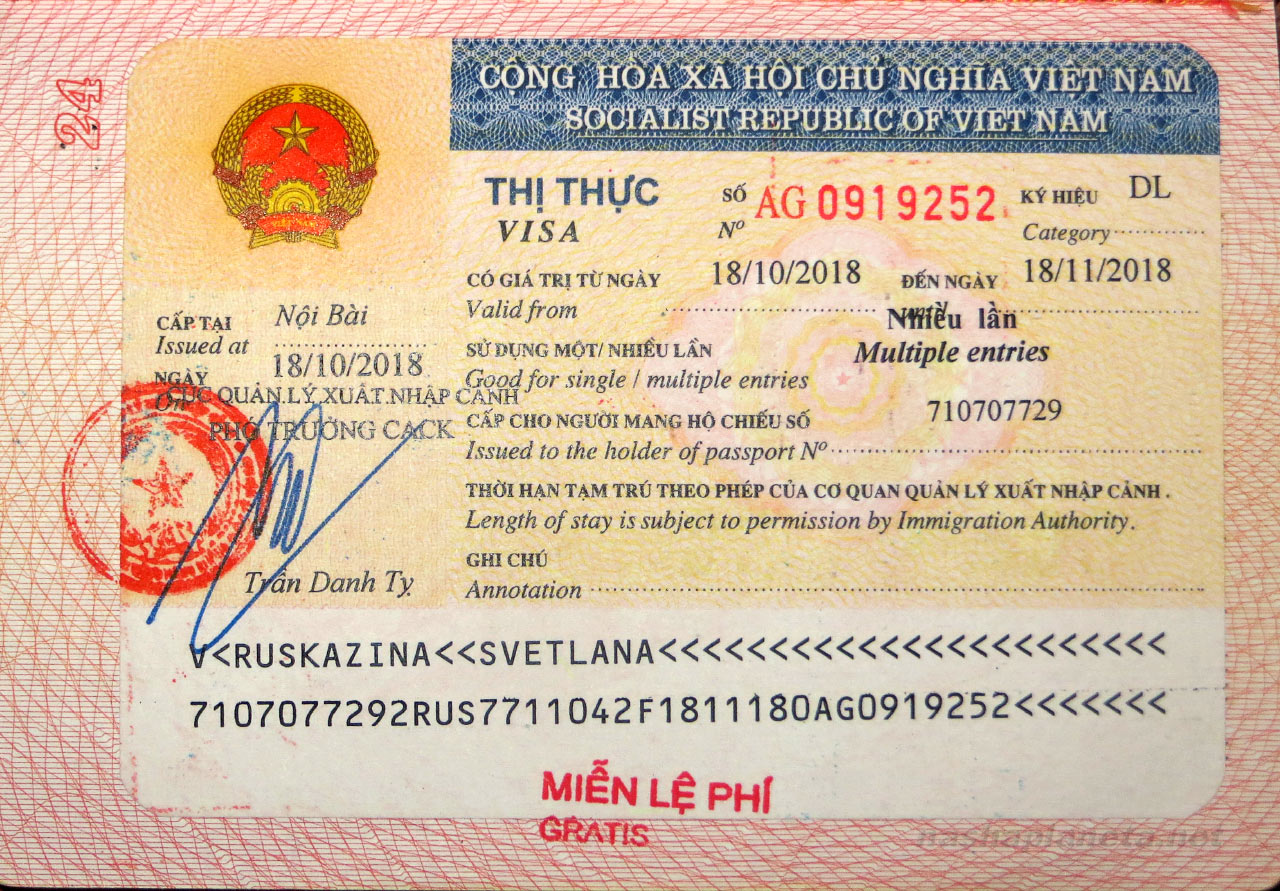
A Vietnamese visa sticker issued in Noi Bai International Airport

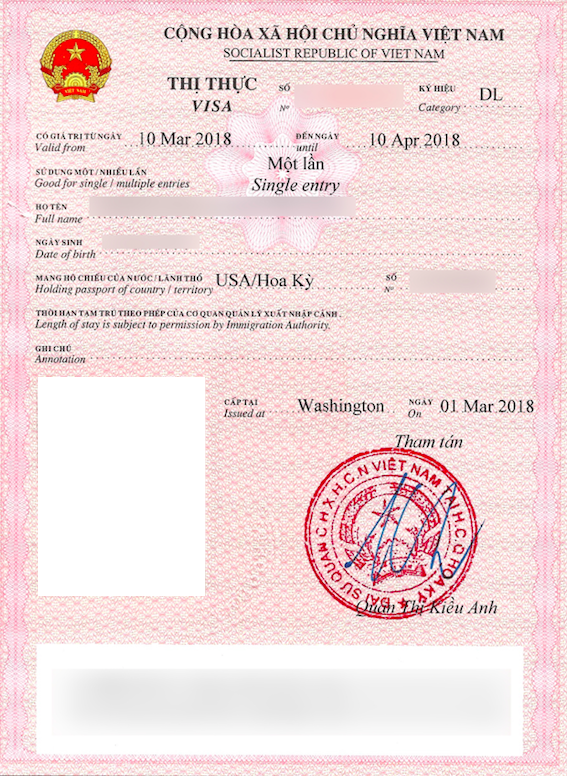
Vietnamese loose-leaf visa

== Visa policy map ==
Visa policy of Vietnam Vietnam Visa not required (90 days) Visa not required (45 days) Visa not required (30 days) Visa not required (21 days) Visa not required (14 days) eVisa (90 days)

== Visa exemption ==
=== Ordinary passports ===
Citizens of the following countries may enter Vietnam without a visa (including all ASEAN member states).

According to the Ministry of Foreign Affairs of Vietnam, the maximum allowed period of stay depends on nationality:

90 days

- Chile
- Panama

45 days

- Belgium (Note: Temporary visa-free regime from 15 August 2025 until 14 August 2028.)
- Bulgaria
- Croatia
- Czechia
- Denmark
- Finland
- France
- Germany
- Hungary
- Italy
- Japan
- Luxembourg
- Netherlands
- Norway
- Poland
- Russia
- Romania
- Slovakia
- Slovenia
- South Korea
- Spain
- Sweden
- Switzerland
- United Kingdom (Note: Including all classes of British nationality, except for British National (Overseas).)

30 days

- Belarus
- Cambodia
- Kazakhstan
- Kyrgyzstan
- Laos
- Malaysia
- Mongolia
- Myanmar
- Singapore
- Thailand

21 days

- Philippines

14 days

- Brunei
- Indonesia (Note: Effective from 15 July 2026.)

Date of visa changes
- 15 July 1985: Kyrgyzstan (signed as USSR)
- 1 April 2000: Philippines
- 9 July 2000: Thailand
- 21 November 2001: Malaysia
- 1 December 2003: Singapore
- 4 December 2003: Indonesia
- 1 January 2004: Japan
- 5 March 2004: Laos
- 1 July 2004: South Korea
- 1 May 2005: Denmark, Finland, Norway and Sweden
- 8 August 2007: Brunei
- 4 December 2008: Cambodia
- 1 January 2009: Russia (resumed)
- 26 October 2013: Myanmar
- 1 July 2015: Belarus (unilateral), France, Germany, Italy, Spain and United Kingdom
- 11 August 2017: Chile
- 1 January 2020: Myanmar (extended from 14 to 30 days)
- 15 January 2021: Panama
- 7 March 2024: Mongolia
- 25 May 2024: Kazakhstan
- 30 January 2025: Belarus (mutual)
- 1 March 2025: Switzerland, Czechia and Poland
- 15 August 2025: Belgium, Bulgaria, Croatia, Hungary, Luxembourg, Netherlands, Romania, Slovakia and Slovenia

Cancelled:

- Russia: 20 February 1994 (was resumed in 2009)

In addition, citizens of China, Cuba and North Korea who have a passport for public affairs or ordinary passports endorsed "for public affairs" may enter Vietnam without a visa.

=== Certificate of visa exemption ===
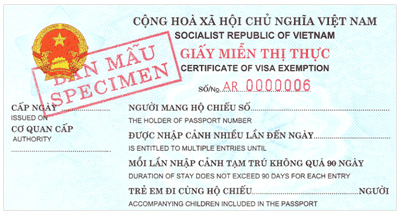
A certificate of visa exemption for an overseas Vietnamese citizen who holds a foreign passport

Holders of certificates of visa exemption do not require a visa regardless of nationality. A certificate of visa exemption is valid for up to 5 years or up to 6 months before the passport expiration date (whichever is shorter). This is available for Vietnamese residing abroad or spouses or children of Vietnamese citizens or Vietnamese residing abroad.

The exemption is valid for 180 consecutive days of stay. There is no limit on the number of entries and exits during the stay or the minimum waiting time between each 180-day stay.

=== APEC Business Travel Card ===
Holders of passports issued by the following countries who possess an APEC Business Travel Card (ABTC) containing "VNM" on the back of the card may enter Vietnam without a visa for business trips for up to 60 days.

ABTCs are issued to citizens of:

- Australia
- Brunei
- Chile
- China
- Hong Kong
- Indonesia
- Japan
- South Korea
- Malaysia
- Mexico
- New Zealand
- Papua New Guinea
- Peru
- Philippines
- Russia
- Singapore
- Taiwan
- Thailand

=== Non-ordinary passports ===
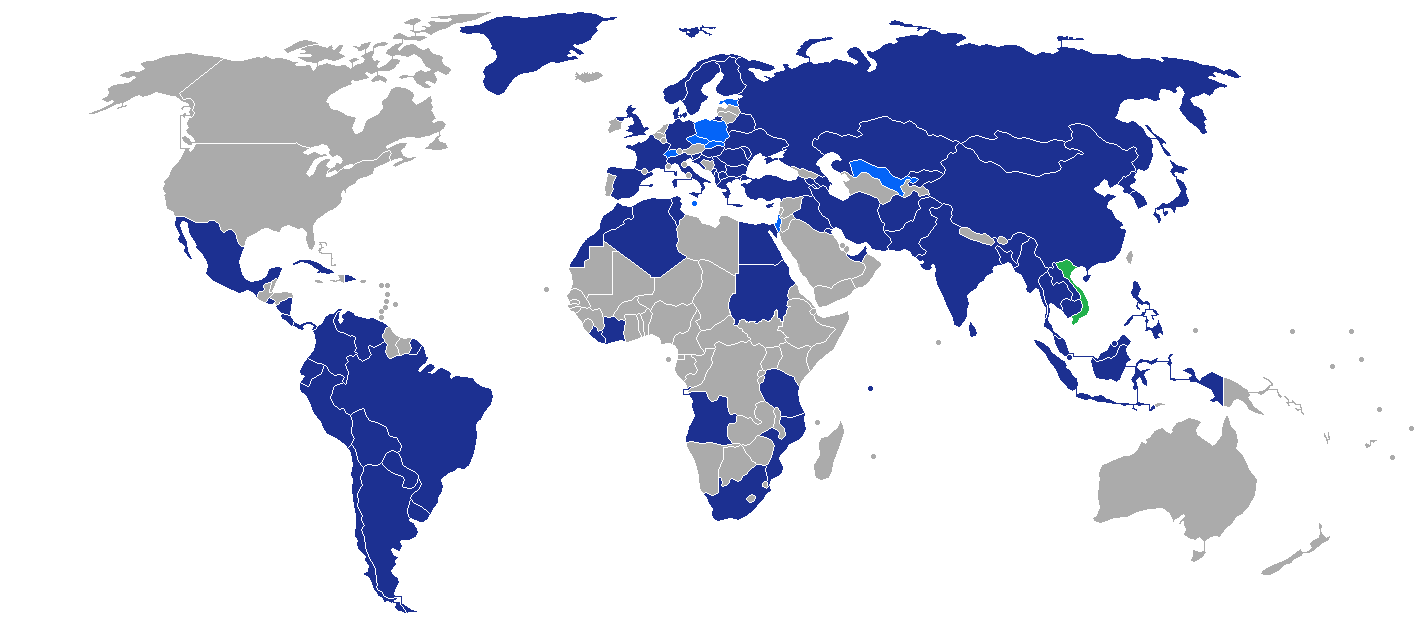
Vietnam Visa not required for diplomatic and official / service passports Visa not required for diplomatic passports

Holders of diplomatic or official / service passports of the following countries may enter Vietnam without a visa for the following period:

90 days

- Albania
- Argentina
- Armenia
- Bulgaria
- Colombia
- Costa Rica
- Côte d'Ivoire
- Croatia
- Cyprus
- Czech Republic^{D}
- Dominican Republic
- Ecuador
- El Salvador
- Estonia^{D}
- France
- Germany
- Hungary
- Italy
- Israel^{D}
- Japan
- Jordan
- Malta^{D}
- Mexico
- Moldova
- Montenegro
- Morocco^{D}
- Nicaragua
- North Macedonia
- Panama
- Poland^{D}
- Romania
- Russia
- Serbia
- Slovakia^{D}
- Slovenia
- South Korea
- Spain
- Switzerland^{D}
- Tunisia^{D}
- Turkey
- Uruguay

30 days

- ASEAN member states (except Brunei)

- Afghanistan^{D}
- Algeria
- Angola
- Azerbaijan
- Bangladesh
- Belarus
- Bolivia
- Brazil
- Chile
- China
- Cuba
- Egypt
- India
- Iraq
- Kazakhstan
- Kuwait
- Mongolia
- Mozambique
- Nepal
- North Korea
- Pakistan
- Paraguay
- Peru
- Saudi Arabia
- Seychelles
- South Africa
- Sri Lanka
- Sudan
- Ukraine
- United Arab Emirates
- Uzbekistan
- United Kingdom^{D}

14 days

- Brunei

_{D - Diplomatic passports only.}

=== Future changes ===
Vietnam has signed visa exemption agreements with the following countries, but they have not yet entered into force:

Country	Passports	Agreement signed on
Timor-Leste	Ordinary	9 June 2026
Nigeria	Diplomatic, official	October 2019
Botswana	Diplomatic, service	August 2019
Lithuania	Diplomatic	23 January 2019
Ethiopia	Diplomatic, service	August 2018
Cameroon	Diplomatic, service	December 2017

In November 2023, the authorities in Vietnam proposed to abolish visas for citizens of China and India. In July 2024 Prime Minister of Vietnam instructed relevant ministries to work on expanding the list of visa exemption eligible countries.

== Phu Quoc Island ==
Phu Quoc Island has a special visa exemption for all foreign visitors arriving directly by air or sea from outside Vietnam. Visitors can stay within Phu Quoc for a duration of 30 days. Visitor's passport must be valid for 6 months since the arrival date.

== Electronic visa (e-Visa) ==
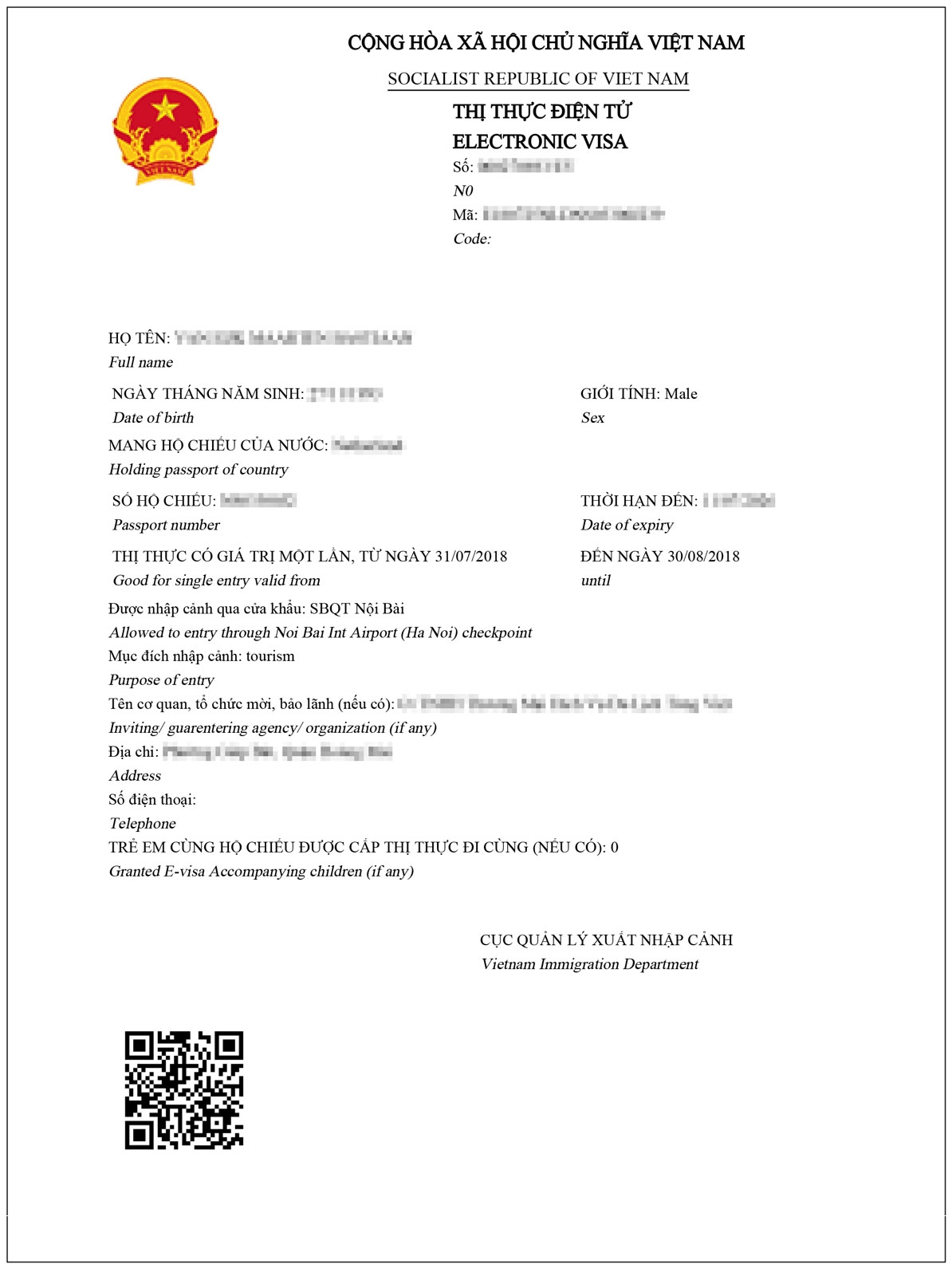
Vietnamese e-Visa

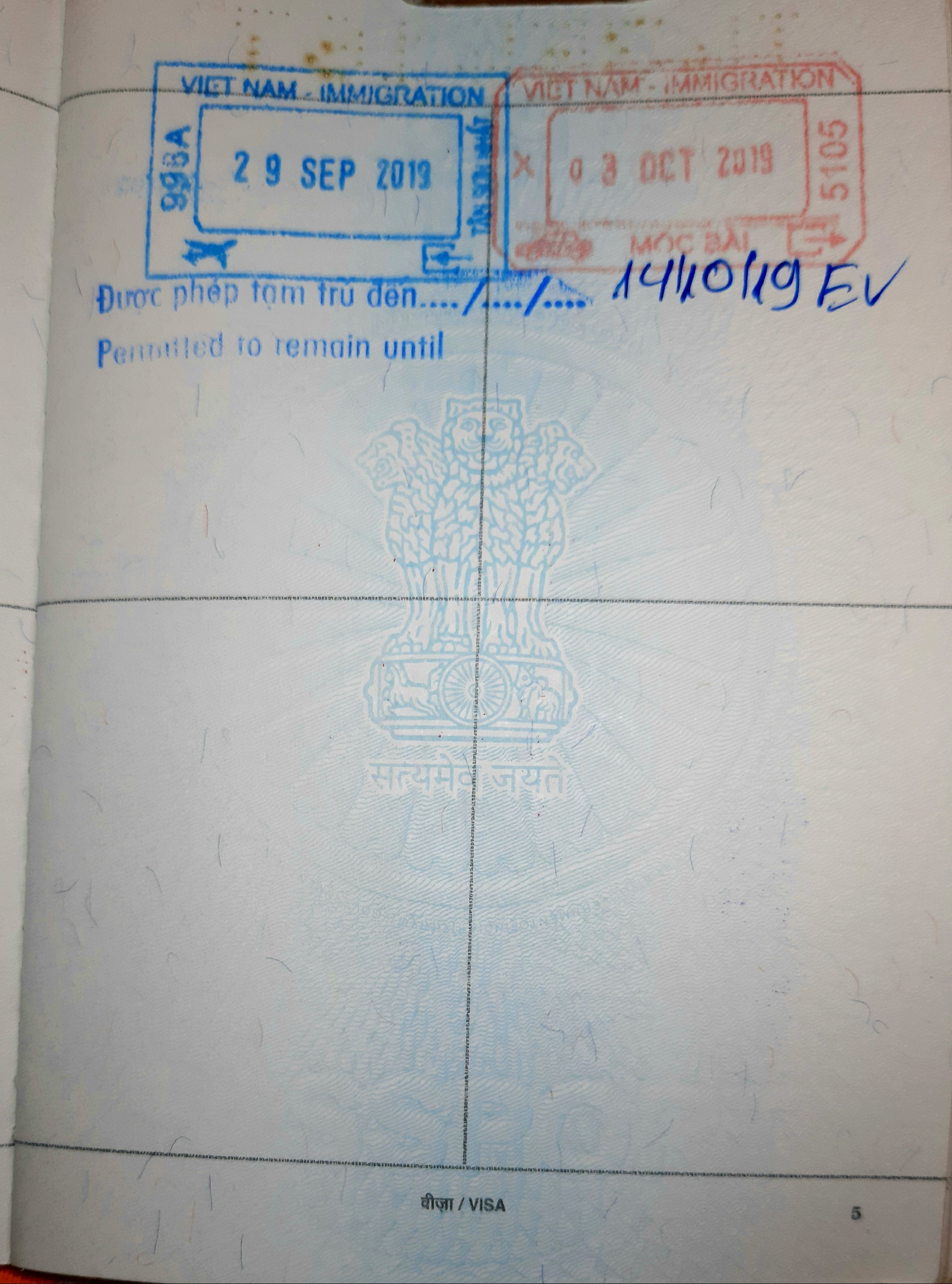
Vietnamese e-Visa Stamp

Vietnam introduced a pilot electronic visa system on 1 February 2017.

Starting from 15 August 2023, an e-Visa is issued to citizens of all countries and territories and is issued for single or multiple entry up to 90 days. The e-Visa costs 25 (single) or 50 (multiple) USD.

The list of border crossings that allow foreigners to enter and exit on an e-Visa includes:

List of international airports

- Noi Bai International Airport, Hanoi
- Tan Son Nhat International Airport, Ho Chi Minh City
- Cam Ranh International Airport
- Da Nang International Airport
- Cat Bi International Airport, Hai Phong
- Can Tho International Airport
- Phu Quoc International Airport
- Phu Bai International Airport, Huế
- Van Don International Airport
- Lien Khuong International Airport
- Tho Xuan Airport
- Dong Hoi Airport
- Phu Cat Airport
- Long Thanh International Airport (Not in operation)
- Gia Binh International Airport (Not in operation)
- Vinh International Airport
- Chu Lai International Airport

List of road border crossings

Port of entry	Opposite side
Mong Cai, Quảng Ninh province	Dongxing, Guangxi, China
Huu Nghi, Lạng Sơn province	Pingxiang, Guangxi, China
Lao Cai, Lào Cai province	Hekou, Yunnan, China
Trà Lĩnh, Cao Bằng province	Longbang, Jingxi, Guangxi, China
Thanh Thuy, Tuyên Quang province	Tianbao, Wenshan, Yunnan, China
Tay Trang, Điện Biên province	Laos
Na Mèo, Thanh Hóa province	Namsoi, Houaphanh, Laos
Nam Can, Nghệ An province	Laos
Cau Treo, Hà Tĩnh province	Nam Phao, Bolikhamsai, Laos
Cha Lo, Quảng Bình province	Laos
La Lay, Quảng Trị province	Laos
Lao Bảo, Quảng Trị province	Dansavan, Savannakhet, Laos
Bo Y, Kon Tum province	Laos
Long Sap, Son La Province	Laos
Nam Giang, Da Nang	Laos
Moc Bai, Tây Ninh province	Bavet municipality, Cambodia
Xa Mat, Tây Ninh province	Cambodia
Binh Hiep, Tây Ninh province	Cambodia
Tan Nam, Tây Ninh province	Cambodia
Tịnh Biên, An Giang province	Cambodia
Vĩnh Xương, An Giang province	Cambodia
Hà Tiên, Kiên Giang province	Cambodia
Le Thanh, Gia Lai province	Cambodia
Thường Phước, Dong Thap Province	Cambodia
Dinh Ba, Dong Thap Province	Cambodia

List of train border crossings

- Đồng Đăng station, Lạng Sơn province
- Lào Cai station, Lào Cai province

List of sea border crossings

- Hon Gai Port, Quang Ninh Province
- Cam Pha Port, Quang Ninh Province
- Hai Phong Port, Hai Phong city
- Nghi Son Port, Thanh Hoa Province
- Vung Ang Port, Ha Tinh Province
- Chan May Port, Thua Thien Hue Province
- Da Nang Port, Da Nang City
- Nha Trang Port, Khanh Hoa Province
- Quy Nhon Port, Binh Dinh Province
- Dung Quat Port, Quang Ngai Province
- Vung Tau Port, Ba Ria Province - Vung Tau
- Ho Chi Minh City Port, Ho Chi Minh City
- Duong Dong Port, Kien Giang Province
- Van Gia Port, Quang Ninh Province
- Diem Dien Port, Hung Yen Province
- Hai Thinh Port, Ninh Binh Province
- Ninh Binh Port, Ninh Binh Province
- Cua Lo-Ben Thuy Port, Nghe An Province
- Son Duong Port, Ha Tinh Province
- Giang Port, Quang Tri Province
- Hon La Port, Quang Tri Province
- Cuu Viet Port, Quang Tri Province
- Thuan An Port, Hue City
- Ky Ha Port, Da Nang City
- Sa ky Port, Quang Ngai Province
- Vung Ro Port, Dak Lak Province
- Ca Na Port, Khanh Hoa Province

e-Visa holders who present a Chinese biometric ordinary passport upon arrival must exchange their e-Visa for a free paper visa at the port of entry. This is because the passport contains a disputed map of the South China Sea, and the Vietnamese government refuses to stamp on it.

== Investor visas ==
=== Investor visas in Vietnam 2024 ===
Code	Description	Length
DT1	Investments over VND 100 billion (US$4.15 million), or for investment into ‘prioritised’ sectors, professions, or areas of Vietnam.	5 years
DT2	Investments between VND 50 billion (US$2.07 million) and VND 100 billion (US$4.15 million), or for investment into ‘prioritised’ sectors, professions, or areas of Vietnam.	5 years
DT3	Investor visa: issued for investors with total investment capital between VND 3 billion (US$125,000) and VND 59 billion (US$2.07 million).	3 years
DT4	Investor visa: issued for investors with total investment capital less than VND 3 billion (US$125,000).	12 months

== Phú Quốc Visa-free Program ==
Travellers who are not exempted from visa requirements may enter Phú Quốc without a visa for up to 30 days. They must arrive at Phú Quốc directly from a third country, or from airports in Hanoi or Ho Chi Minh City where they will clear immigration and proceed to the domestic terminals.

== Pre-arranged visa on arrival ==
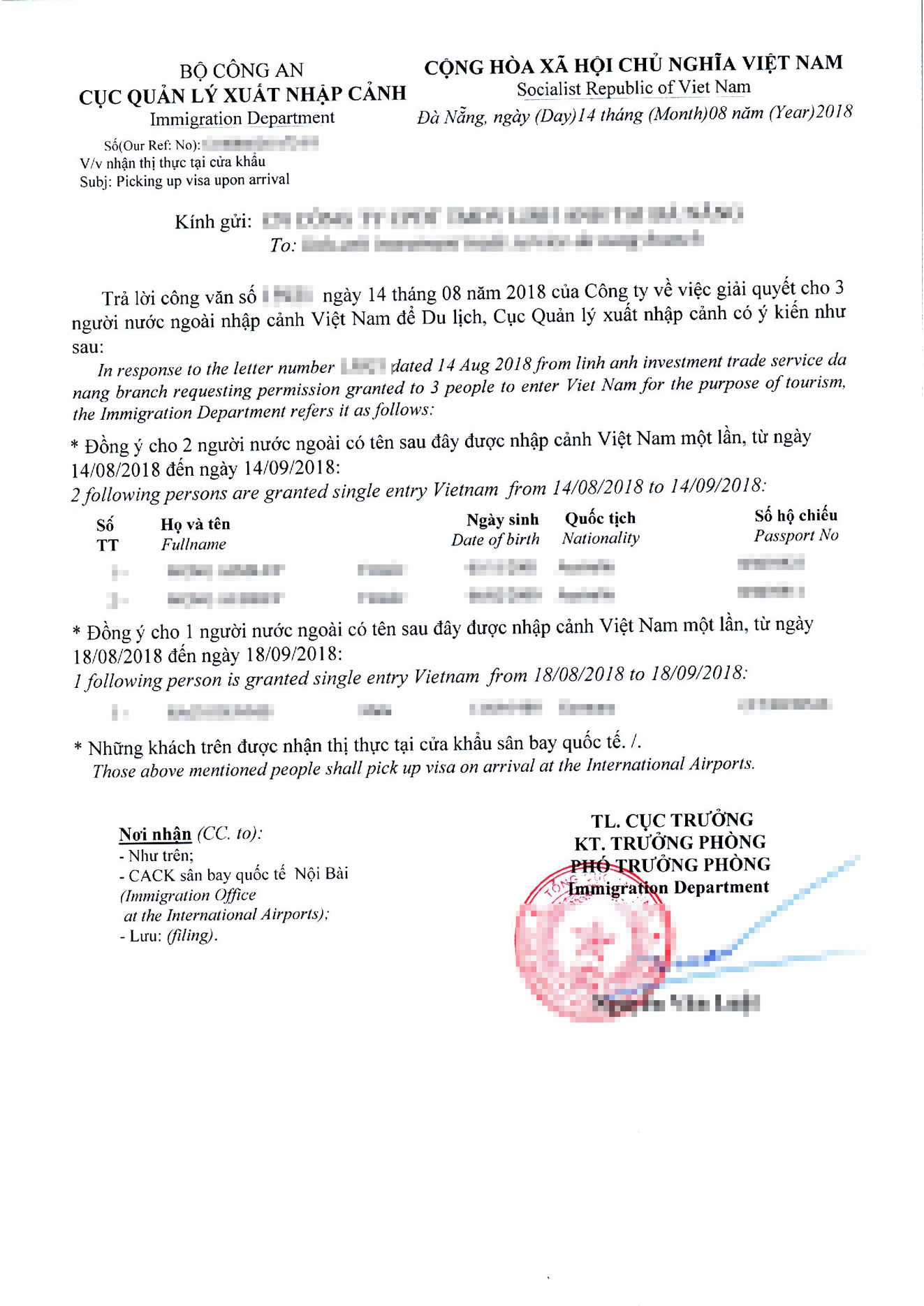
Approval letter for obtaining Vietnamese visa on arrival

Holders of a visa letter issued and stamped in Hanoi or Da Nang or Ho Chi Minh City by the Vietnamese Immigration Department within the Ministry of Public Security or the Consular Department of the Ministry of Foreign Affairs may obtain a visa on arrival for a maximum stay of 1 or 3 months at airports in Hanoi, Ho Chi Minh City, Da Nang, Phu Quoc, Hai Phong, Da Lat or Nha Trang.

== Transit ==
Passengers of any nationality may transit through Vietnam by air without a visa for less than 24 hours providing that they do not intend to leave the sterile transit area. Staying overnight in the transit lounge is permitted.

== Visitor statistics ==
Most visitors arriving in Vietnam on short-term basis were from the following countries of nationality:

Data Source: Ministry of Culture, Sport & Tourism

Country	10/2026	2025	2024	2023	2022	3/2020	2019	2018	2017	2016
China	4,385,978	5,282,002	3,738,126	1,743,204	71,862	871,819	6,806,425	4,966,468	4,008,253	2,696,848
South Korea	3,370,543	4,331,411	4,568,941	3,595,062	769,167	819,089	4,290,802	3,485,406	2,415,245	1,543,883
Taiwan	1,073,946	1,231,510	1,288,861	851,024	89,463	192,216	926,744	714,112	616,232	507,301
United States	808,663	848,727	779,795	717,073	215,274	172,706	746,171	687,226	614,117	552,644
Japan	757,468	814,169	711,464	589,522	128,764	200,346	951,962	826,674	798,119	740,592
India	744,567	746,480	501,427	145,340	N/A	N/A	N/A	N/A	N/A	N/A
Russia	1,254,174	689,714	232,300	125,610	28,056	244,966	646,524	606,637	574,164	433,987
Cambodia*	787,120	687,132	474,580	402,062	140,461	120,430	227,910	202,954	222,614	211,949
Malaysia*	533,440	573,716	495,383	470,105	135,007	116,221	606,206	540,119	480,456	407,574
Australia	542,970	548,471	490,880	390,087	99,156	92,227	383,511	386,934	370,438	320,678
Philippines*	579,199	482,173	265,947	153,168	36,281	36,969	179,190	151,641	133,543	110,967
Thailand*	401,451	457,775	418,054	489,174	162,567	125,725	509,802	349,310	301,587	266,984
Singapore*	387,575	401,420	347,495	328,195	128,399	51,726	308,969	286,246	277,658	257,041
United Kingdom	323,675	368,318	306,194	253,522	67,337	81,433	315,084	298,114	283,537	254,841
France	300,135	337,729	278,943	215,508	58,107	74,480	287,655	279,659	255,369	240,808
Germany	261,731	291,039	249,517	200,425	59,975	61,465	226,792	213,986	199,872	176,015
Indonesia*	216,502	207,196	184,093	105,380	26,338	21,446	106,688	87,941	81,065	69,653
Laos*	162,643	179,340	148,655	120,522	47,002	36,810	98,492	120,009	141,588	137,004
Canada	162,860	173,391	152,527	133,493	37,894	41,807	159,121	149,535	138,242	122,929
Italy	90,210	107,358	88,912	57,054	15,051	17,774	70,798	65,562	58,041	51,265
Spain	75,128	97,442	91,370	76,087	22,511	11,783	83,597	77,071	69,528	57,957
Netherlands	86,258	91,709	78,043	68,057	19,756	18,265	81,092	77,300	72,277	64,712
Poland	72,223	72,928	51,157	N/A	N/A	N/A	N/A	N/A	N/A	N/A
New Zealand	58,150	57,128	47,963	33,730	8,681	9,470	47,088	49,854	49,115	42,588
Denmark	39,443	41,410	36,920	30,231	8,250	14,444	42,043	39,926	34,720	30,996
Switzerland	37,519	39,875	33,584	27,929	8,025	10,845	36,577	34,541	33,123	31,475
Sweden	35,420	39,499	34,267	25,755	6,487	21,857	50,704	49,723	44,045	37,679
Belgium	34,351	37,566	31,730	26,353	8,104	7,452	34,187	31,382	29,144	26,231
Norway	31,027	33,264	27,936	22,717	5,235	8,958	28,037	26,134	24,293	23,110
Czech Republic	25,538	N/A	N/A	N/A	N/A	N/A	N/A	N/A	N/A	N/A
Total	19,535,396	21,168,291	17,583,901	12,602,434	3,661,222	3,686,779	18,008,591	15,497,791	12,922,151	10,012,735

* Country in ASEAN

== History ==
Decree No. 390/TTg dated October 27, 1959, on the regulation of passport control, signed by Prime Minister Pham Van Dong, was the first legal document that regulated passport control in Vietnam. Article 1 of the decree states:

Vietnamese citizens and foreigners entering or leaving the Democratic Republic of Vietnam must carry a passport with a visa issued by the competent authority of the Democratic Republic of Vietnam, and must present the passport with the visa to the police station at the final place when leaving or the first place when entering.

This means that both Vietnamese citizens and foreigners, when leaving or entering Vietnam, must have a passport and a visa. A person who wants to leave the territory of Vietnam must have an exit visa. Exit visas are administrative procedures imposed to restrict the freedom of citizens of a country to travel abroad. This measure was previously used by many countries, especially socialist countries, to control their citizens and migration issues. Currently, only a very few countries in the world still use exit visas (for example: Saudi Arabia). Therefore, before the Renovation period, the travel of Vietnamese citizens abroad was highly restricted and tightly controlled. Vietnamese individuals were issued passports and exit/entry visas mainly for official work purposes, with decisions made by relevant authorities.

In 1988, Prime Minister Vo Van Kiet issued the Decision of the Chairman of the Council of Ministers No. 48/CT dated February 26, 1988, on allowing Vietnamese citizens to temporarily leave the country to settle personal matters. This decision relaxed the regulations on exit permits "to meet the legitimate aspirations of our people to apply for temporary exit permits to settle personal matters".

In 1993, the Government issued Decree No. 48-CP on passports and visas, which unified the regulations on passport types and visas for the first time. The decree officially abolished entry visas for holders of Vietnamese passports, as stated in Article 10, Clause 3:

Vietnamese citizens (except Vietnamese citizens residing abroad) holding diplomatic passports, official passports, or ordinary passports are exempt from entry visas to Vietnam.

It was not until 1997 that Prime Minister Phan Van Khai officially abolished the regulation on exit visas for Vietnamese citizens by issuing the Decision No. 957/1997/QD-TTg of the Prime Minister on improving some procedures for exit and addressing the issue of Vietnamese citizens who have left the country but have not returned on time, stated in Clause 2, Article 1:

Vietnamese citizens with valid passports are exempt from exit visas and can pass through Vietnam's international border gates.

As for foreigners, in 2000, the National Assembly abolished exit visas by referring to all types of visas (exit, entry, exit-entry, entry-exit) as visas (valid for entry and exit) in the Ordinance No. 24/2000/PL-UBTVQH10 on Entry, Exit, and Residence of Foreigners in Vietnam by the Standing Committee of the National Assembly.

In 2014, the National Assembly of Vietnam issued the Law on Entry, Exit, Transit, and Residence of Foreigners in Vietnam (No. 47/2014/QH13), which is the highest legal document that regulates all activities related to the entry, exit, transit, and residence of foreigners in Vietnam.

== See also ==
- Visa requirements for Vietnamese citizens
