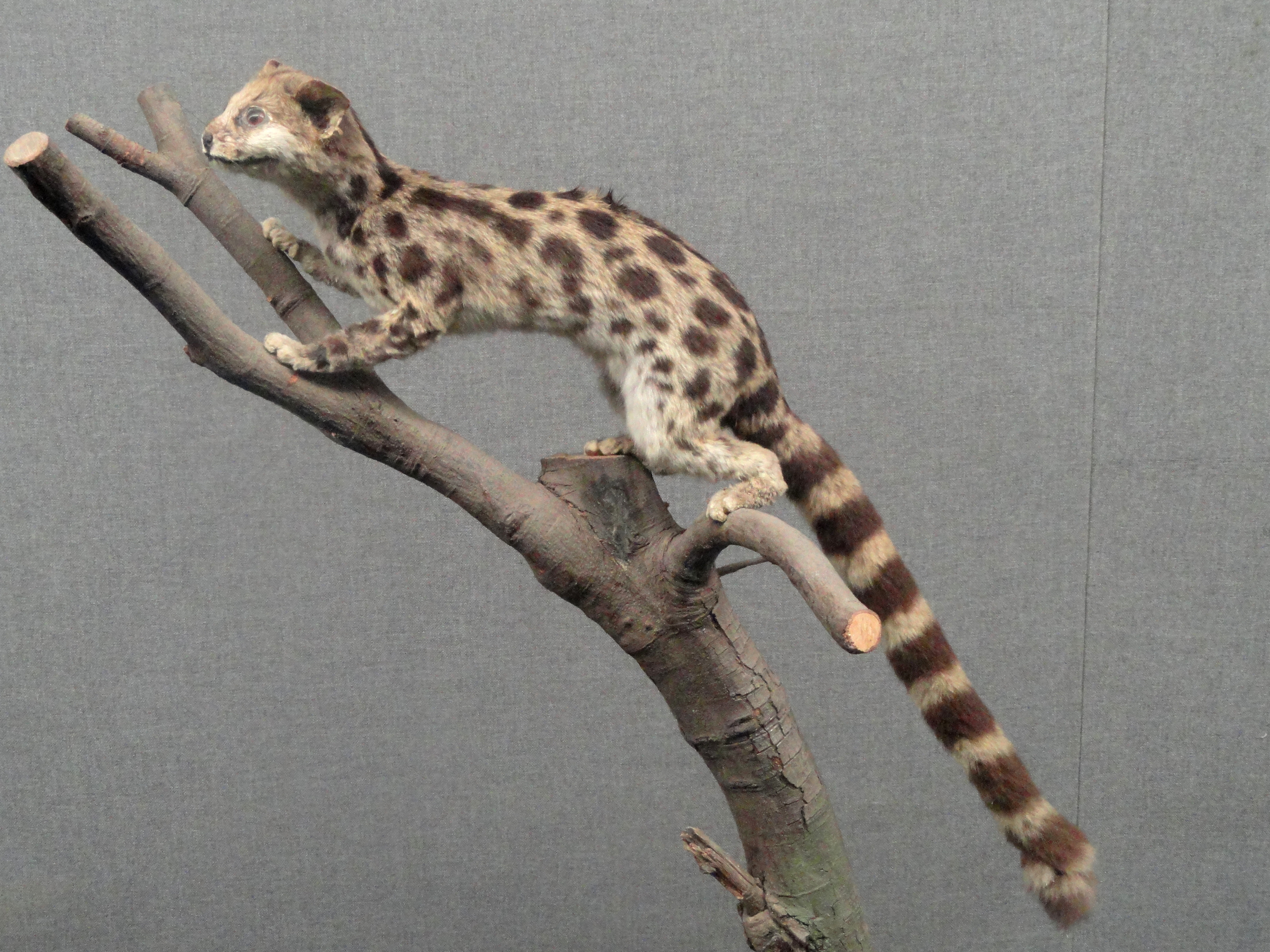

Conservation status
- Least Concern (IUCN 3.1)
- CITES Appendix I

Scientific classification
- Kingdom: Animalia
- Phylum: Chordata
- Class: Mammalia
- Order: Carnivora
- Family: Prionodontidae
- Genus: Prionodon
- Species: P. pardicolor

Binomial name
- Prionodon pardicolor Hodgson, 1842
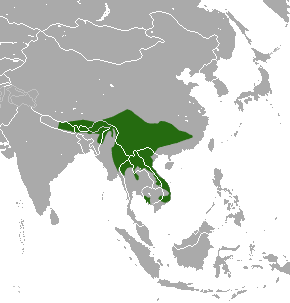
- Spotted linsang range

= Spotted linsang =

Spotted linsang Temporal range: Middle Miocene-Present

Species of carnivore

The spotted linsang (Prionodon pardicolor) is a linsang, a tree-dwelling carnivorous mammal, native to much of Southeast Asia. It is widely, though usually sparsely, recorded, and listed as Least Concern on the IUCN Red List.

== Characteristics ==
The spotted linsang resembles the banded linsang in its long, slender body, short limbs, elongated neck and head, and long tail. The ground colour ranges from dusky brown to light buff. Two long stripes extend from behind the ears to the shoulders or beyond, and two shorter stripes run along the neck. Three to four longitudinal rows of spots adorn the back, their size decreasing towards the belly. The fore legs are spotted to the paw, the hind legs to the hock. The cylindrical tail has eight or nine broad dark rings, separated by narrow white rings. The feet have five digits, and the area between the pads is covered with hair. The claws are retractile, claw sheaths are present on the fore paws, but the hind-paws have protective lobes of skin. It weighs about 0.45 kg (1 lb) and measures in length about 360–380 mm (14–15 in) with a 30–33 cm (12–13 in) long tail. Its height is about 13–14 cm (5–5.5 in), the girth of its chest 14.6 cm (5.75 in), and length of head to the occiput about 7.6 cm (3 in).

== Distribution and habitat ==
The range of the spotted linsang includes eastern Nepal, Sikkim, Assam and Bengal in India, Bhutan, northeastern Myanmar, northern Thailand, Laos, northern Vietnam, and western Sichuan, Yunnan Guizhou and southwestern Guangxi in southern China. It is uncommon to rare throughout this range. It is rarely observed in northern Bengal. It primarily inhabits evergreen forests and shrubland. A large portion of this habitat is not protected, and this may cause the spotted linsang to be threatened with extinction due to habitat loss. In Nam Et-Phou Louey National Biodiversity Conservation Area, it was observed in secondary vegetation dominated by banana stands in 2017.

== Ecology and behaviour ==
The spotted linsang is nocturnal, solitary, and at least partly arboreal. It uses hollows in trees as resting and denning sites. It hunts on the ground and in trees and feeds on rodents, frogs and snakes. It has also been observed feeding on carcass.

== Taxonomy ==
The Asiatic linsangs (Prionodon) are not, as was traditionally thought, members of the Viverridae (which does include the African linsangs), and may instead be the closest living relatives of the family Felidae. They have been placed in their own family, the Prionodontidae. In 2004, Cytochrome b gene sequencing data changed the opinion of having Prionodon within the Viverrinae subfamily. Genetic data indicate that the similarities between Asiatic and African linsangs are due to convergence.
