= Viengthong district =

Viengthong district may refer to a few different districts in Laos.

- Viengthong district, Bolikhamsai
- Viengthong district, Houaphanh
