= Ban Kenpha =

- Village
- Location within Laos
- Coordinates: 20°31′58″N 103°17′6″E
- Country: Laos
- Province: Houaphanh
- Time zone: UTC+7 (ICT)

Ban Kenpha is a village in Houaphanh Province, northeastern Laos. It is to the northeast of Vieng Kham, not far from Muang Xon.
