= Viengxay district =

Viengxay district ເມືອງວຽງໄຊ
- District
- Interactive map of Viengxay district
- Country: Laos
- Province: Houaphanh
- Time zone: UTC+7 (ICT)

Viengxay is a district (muang) of Houaphanh province in northeastern Laos. It is home to the Viengxay Caves, the Nam Et National Biodiversity Conservation Area, and Phou Pha Thi mountain, site of the Secret War Battle of Lima Site 85 (LS-85) 11 March 1968.

Localities within the district include:

- Namsoi
