= Sungai Kial Forest Reserve =

Coordinates: 4.3°N 101.3°E

The Sungai Kial Forest Reserve is a protected area of tropical rainforest habitat in Cameron Highlands, Pahang, Malaysia. The reserve is 100–250 km^{2} (39–97 sq mi) (uncertain boundaries), but is connected to, and part of, a large forest complex in the Cameron Highlands Forest Complex (> 4,000 km^{2} (1,500 sq mi)). Here the altitude ranges from 1,000–2,000 m (3,300–6,600 ft), making the likely forest type tropical hill or montane forest, and most likely possessing a high representation of tree species in the dipterocarp family.

A camera trapping survey was carried out here in 1999, led by Wan Shaharuddin of the Department of Wildlife and National Parks (as part of the Tiger Research Unit) and discovered a range of species including the marbled cat, leopard cat, asian golden cat, muntjac, malay civet, masked palm civet, common porcupine, brush-tailed porcupine, pangolin, sun bear, wild boar, banded linsang, short-tailed macaque (probably meaning the pig-tailed macaque) and wild dog (probably dhole). Despite being connected to the larger Cameron Highlands forest complex, there were no tigers detected, which could be due to the relatively low sampling effort (just 575 camera trap nights).
