= Namsoi =

Border crossing between Laos and Vietnam

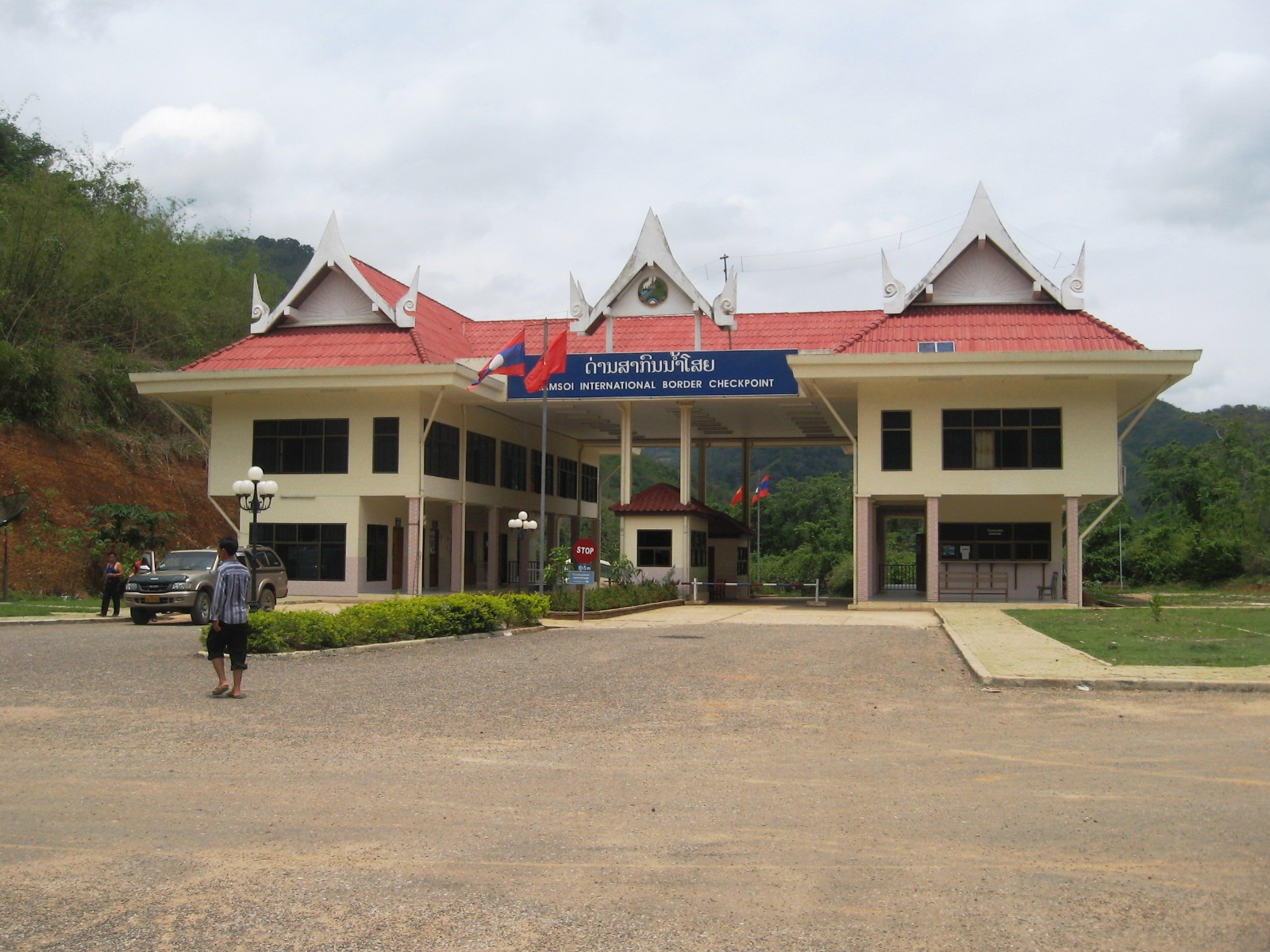

Namsoi (ນ້ຳໂສຍ) is a border crossing gate into Laos in Viengxay District, Houaphan Province. It lies just across the border from Na Meo (Bản Na Mèo), Vietnam.

International passport holders may cross the border here, but Lao visa on arrival has not been available at this crossing since Covid. Lao e-visas are also not accepted here, only stamped visas in one's passport.
