= Muang Xon =

- Town
- Location within Laos
- Coordinates: 20°27′35″N 103°20′44″E
- Country: Laos
- Province: Houaphanh
- Time zone: UTC+7 (ICT)

Muang Xon is a small river town in Houaphanh Province, northeastern Laos. It is to the south by river from Ban Xay, and lies to the southeast of Vieng Kham, and to the north of Vieng Thong. Phou Soy mountain (2257 m) lies to the southwest. Along with Ban Sop Hao, Muang Xon is said to be one of the finest producers of textiles.
