= Viengthong district, Houaphanh =

Viengthong district ເມືອງວຽງທອງ
- District
- Interactive map of Viengthong district
- Country: Laos
- Province: Houaphanh
- Time zone: UTC+7 (ICT)

Viengthong district is a district (muang) of Houaphanh province in northeastern Laos. It is the gateway to the Nam Et-Phou Louey National Park, which protects mountain forests which are home to a number of endangered species. The park headquarters is in the town.

== History ==
Before the Laotian Civil War, Viengthong district was under the same jurisdiction as Pak Seng district, Luang Prabang province, and was a Buddhist settlement called Muang Hiem, which means 'beware of the tiger', alluding to tiger attacks in the area.

There was a temple called Vat Hiem on a nearby hill where the district government administration building sits today, but this was destroyed by US bombing during the Laotian Civil War. The only remnants are a stupa and an unexploded bomb lodged deep in the ground, deemed not to be dangerous.

== See also ==
- Viengthong district, Bolikhamsai, another Laos district by the same name
