= Houaphanh province =

Province of Laos

Houaphanh province ແຂວງ ຫົວພັນ
- Province
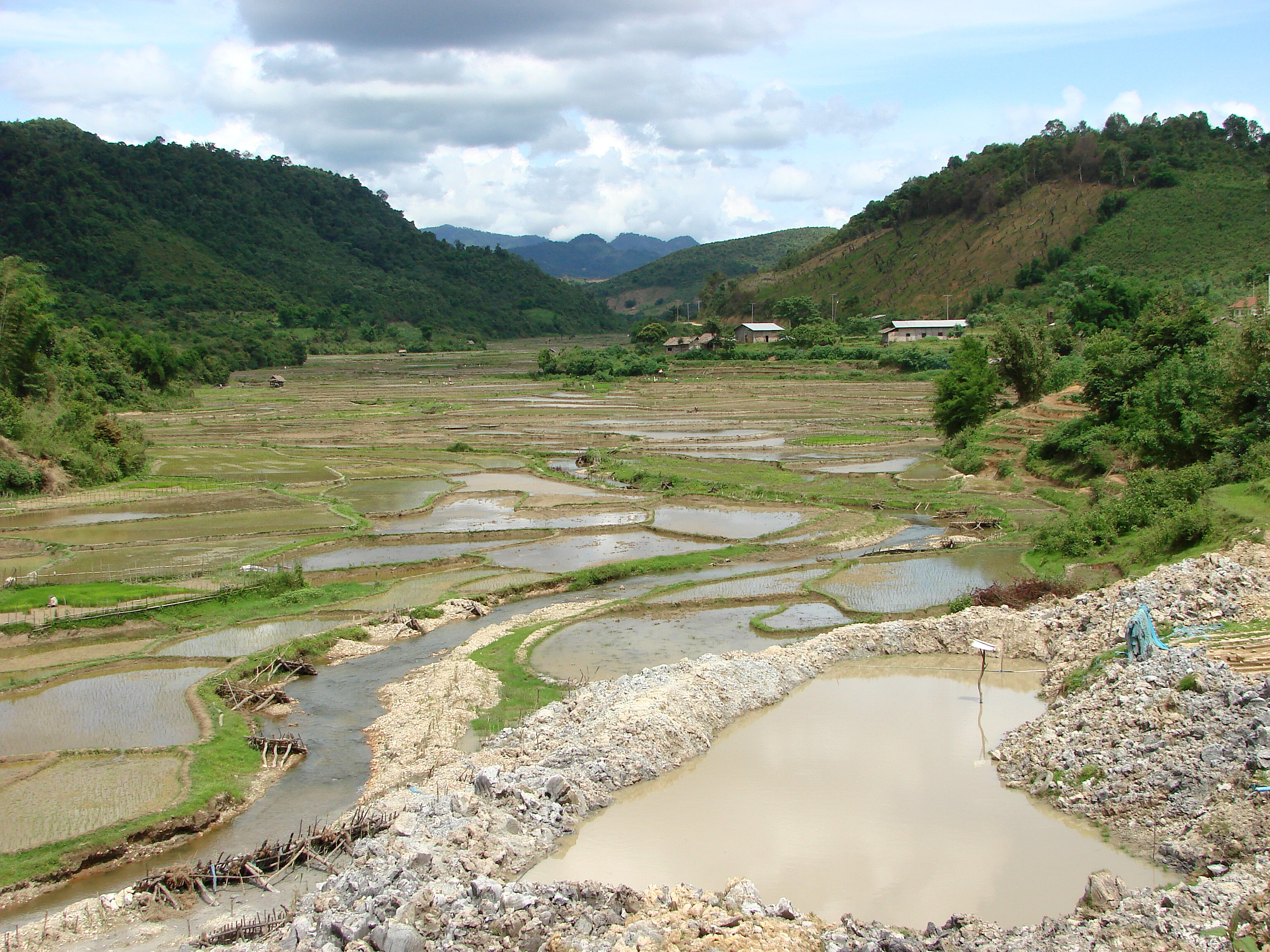

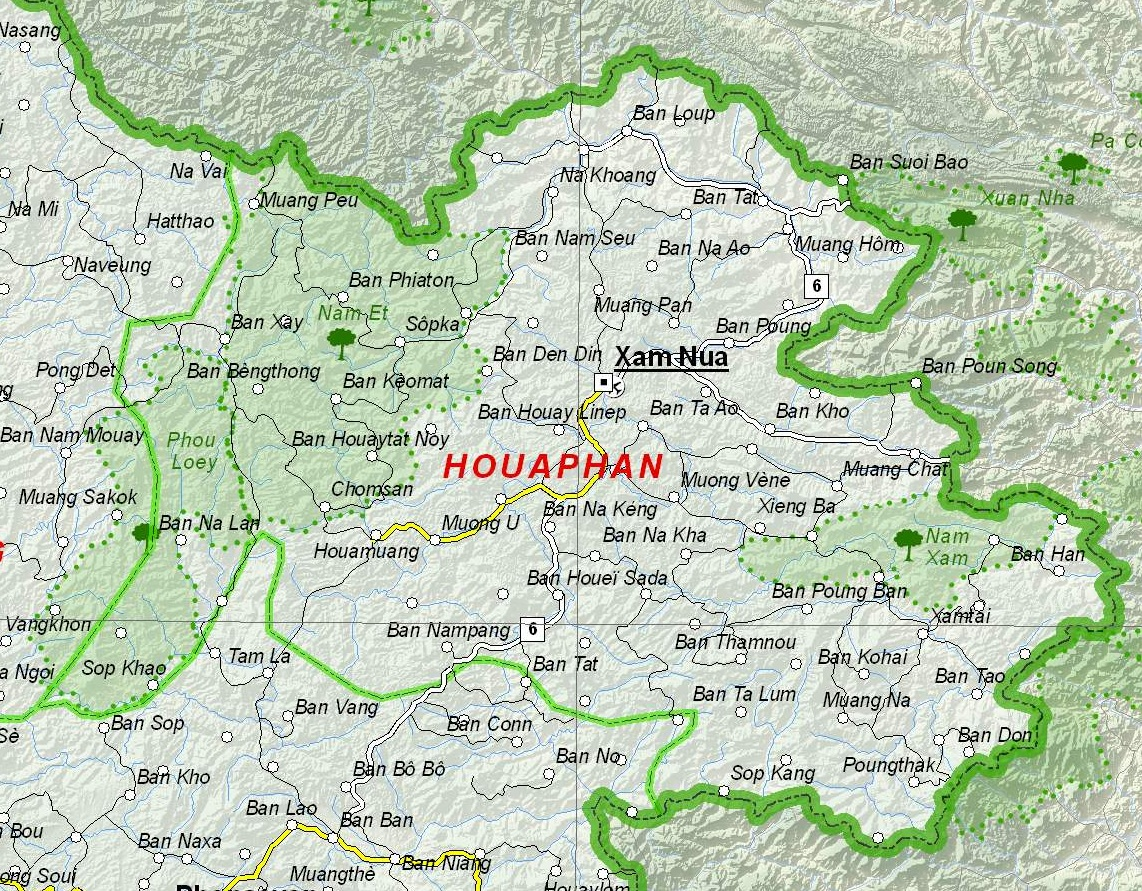
- Map of Houaphanh province

- Location of Houaphanh province in Laos
- Coordinates: 20.3333°N 103.833°E
- Country: Laos
- Capital: Xam Neua

Area
  - Total: 16,500 km^{2} (6,400 sq mi)

Population (2020 census)
  - Total: 310,976
  - Density: 18.8/km^{2} (48.8/sq mi)
- Time zone: UTC+7 (ICT)
- ISO 3166 code: LA-HO
- HDI (2022): ▲0.592 medium · 10th

Houaphanh province (Lao: ຫົວພັນ, pronounced [hǔa.pʰán], Romanization of Lao: Houaphan also Huaphan) is a province in eastern Laos. Its capital is Xam Neua. Houaphanh province covers an area of 16,500 square kilometres (6,400 sq mi). It is bordered by Vietnam to the north, east, and southeast, Xiangkhouang province to the south and southwest, and Luang Prabang province to the west.

== Geography ==
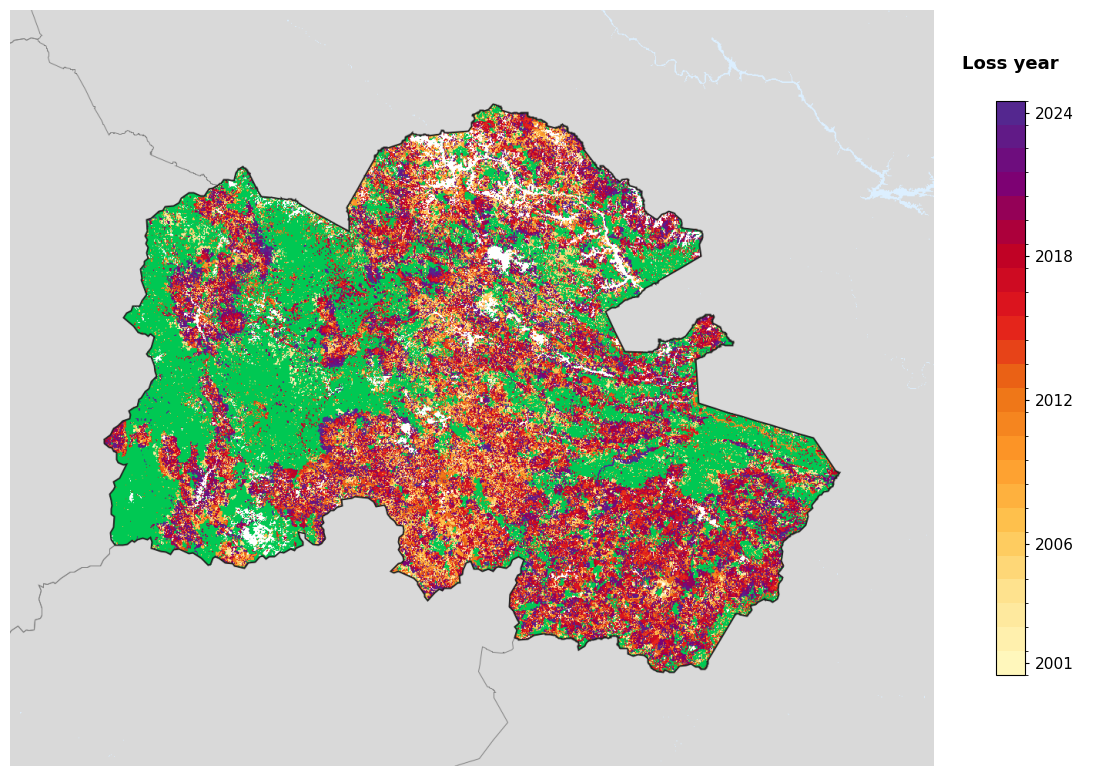
Tree-cover loss year in Houaphanh, 2001-2024, from the Global Forest Change dataset.

Houaphanh province covers an area of 16,500 square kilometres (6,400 sq mi). The province is bordered by Vietnam to the north, east and southeast, Xiangkhouang province to the south and southwest, and Luang Prabang province to the west.

Forest forms most of the province, particularly on the western side. Settlements include Xam Neua, Muong U, Houamuang, Chomsan, Muang Pan, Muang Hom, Muang Peu, Muang Xon, Ban Muang-Et, Ban Nampang, Muong Vene, Xamtai, Muang Na, and Poungthak.

A road running through the province is Route 6. The principal rivers are the Sông Mã (which flows from and into Vietnam, passing the village of Ban Muang-Et) and the Nam Sam (which the town of Xam Neua lies on).

=== Protected areas ===
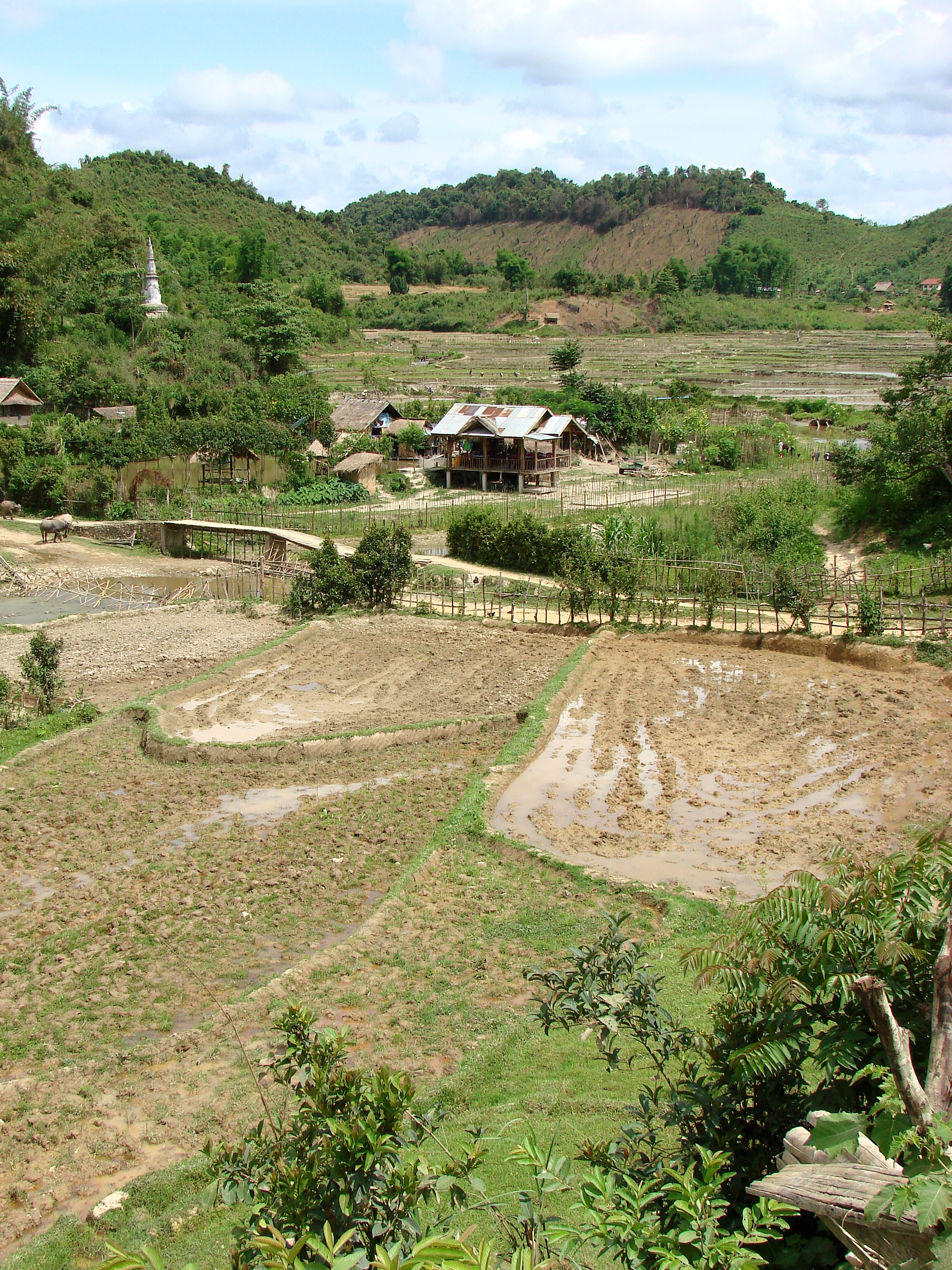
A village area in Houaphanh province

Areas of Houaphanh province are in the Nam Et-Phou Louey National Biodiversity Conservation Area (NBCA) and the Nam Xam National Biodiversity Conservation Area.

The Nam Neun IBA area of Nam Et is adjacent to the NBCA. Nam Neun is 85,450 ha in size, and is at an elevation of 800–1,500 metres (2,600–4,900 ft). The habitat is characterized as mixed deciduous forest, and dry evergreen forest, with stands of bamboo, and occasional conifers; cleared areas have been replaced by areas of secondary grassland. Avifauna include great hornbill (Buceros bicornis) and Blyth's kingfisher (Alcedo hercules).

The Phou Louey Massif IBA is in the Nam Et-Phou Louey NBCA and adjacent to the Nam Neun IBA. The Phou Louey IBA stretches beyond Houaphanh province into Luang Prabang province. It is 60,070 ha in size and is at an elevation of 700–1,800 metres (2,300–5,900 ft). The habitat is characterized as mixed deciduous forest, semi-evergreen forest, lower montane evergreen forest, upper montane evergreen forest, and secondary grassland. Avifauna include beautiful nuthatch (Sitta formosa), rufous-necked hornbill (Aceros nipalensis), Blyth's kingfisher (Alcedo hercules), and yellow-vented warbler (Phylloscopus cantator). There are 4 confirmed species of turtles and 2 confirmed species of ungulate.

The 69,000 hectare Nam Xam IBA is in the 70,000 ha Nam Xam National Biodiversity Conservation Area (NBCA). The IBA's elevation varies between 300–1,800 metres (980–5,910 ft). The topography is characterized by hills and mountains. The habitat includes dry evergreen forest, Fokienia forest, mixed deciduous forest, and stunted, mossy upper montane forest. Avifauna includes beautiful nuthatch (Sitta formosa), brown hornbill (Anorrhinus tickelli), great hornbill (Buceros bicornis), red-collared woodpecker (Picus rabieri), and rufous-necked hornbill (Aceros nipalensis).

=== Administrative divisions ===
The province is made up of the following districts:

Map	Code	Name	Lao script
	7-01	Xam Neua District	ເມືອງຊຳເໜືອ
	7-02	Xiengkho District	ເມືອງຊຽງຄໍ້
	7-03	Viengthong District	ເມືອງວຽງທອງ
	7-04	Viengxay District	ເມືອງວຽງໄຊ
	7-05	Houameuang District	ເມືອງຫົວເມືອງ
	7-06	Samtay District	ເມືອງຊຳໃຕ້
	7-07	Sop Bao District	ເມືອງສົບເບົາ
	7-08	Et District	ເມືອງແອດ

== History ==
The province, along with Xiangkhoang, was part of the Muang Phuan Kingdom (Vietnamese: Bồn Man) since the 14th century. Following a Vietnamese invasion in 1478 led by King Lê Thánh Tông, it became Trấn Ninh Territory of the Đại Việt Kingdom with the capital at Sầm Châu. The area was known as Hua Phan Tang Ha Tang Hok, "the fifth and the sixth province", and listed by Auguste Pavie as "Hua Panh, Tang-Ha, Tang-Hoc."

It remained a Vietnamese outpost territory until 1851 when it become part of Thailand, after the 1893 Franco-Siamese crisis. Ownership was switched by French authorities, then back to Laos during the French colonial period. Under the French spelling, the province was sometimes Hua Phan.

The province is home to the Viengxay caves, a network of caves used by the Pathet Lao. Caves in the province served as hideouts for figures in Laos in the 1950s and 1960s. Tham Than Souphanouvong Cave was the hideout of the revolutionary leader and later the President, Souphanouvong, who built a base there in 1964. Revolutionary leader and later the President Kaysone Phomvihane hid out in Tham Than Kaysone Cave from 1964, and later President Khamtay Siphandone hid at Tham Than Khamtay Cave from 1964. He established a base there, with meeting rooms, reception rooms, and a research room.

Houaphanh province was noted for its samana ('re-education') camps. The Lao royal family were believed to have been taken to 1 such camp near Sop Hao in 1977. Crown Prince Say Vong Savang allegedly died at the camp in May 1978, followed by his father, King Savang Vatthana, of starvation 11 days later.

Religious minorities sometimes face persecution in the province, and at the end of 1999 some minorities were arrested.

== Economy ==
In 1998, three-quarters of the population were classified as poor. In 2002 GDP per capita was US$50–204, compared to the national average of US$350. Socio-economic problems plague the province, with a higher infant mortality rate and lower access to safe water and medical facilities than the national average.

Bamboo is used as a principal building material. In Viengxay District there are two bamboo processing factories that produce items such as floormats, fences, chopsticks and toothpicks for the Vietnamese market.

Xam Neua, the provincial centre, is a market centre for regional trade. Villagers come here to sell their goods. Saleu and Nasala villages in Xiengkho District along Route 6 are noted for their skills at weaving and handicrafts. Samtay is noted for its textiles.

Rice farming is practiced in the province, while agriculture employs fewer than livestock farming. Cash crops include corn, sesame, soybean, and medicinal plants such as man on ling, duk duea, and kalamong, paper mulberry, styrax, cardamon and cinnamon. Up to 15% are involved in opium cultivation and up to 10% involved in making handicrafts. Attempts to control poppy cultivation have been made through the Narcotics Crop Control Project and the Houaphanh Project Agreement.

A tourism development plan has been created for the province, capitalizing on the caves as tourist attractions, providing information and services at the sites.

Asian Development Bank launched a project in 2006 specifically covering 31 villages of Xam Neua and Samtay Districts to wean people away from shifting cultivation practices and to eliminate opium addiction; as of 2006, opium was grown in the province in an area of about 30 ha. The project includes programs to increase income, conserve forest resources, eradicate opium, and experiment with pilot projects to enhance livelihood sources.

== Demography ==
The population of the province, as of 2015, was 289,393. The capital is Xam Neua.

== Landmarks ==
Xanglot Cave is where weddings and traditional festivals were held during the war.

Wat Pho Xai or Wat Pho Xaysanalam is on the outskirts of Sam Neua. Hintang Archaeological Park, a UNESCO World Heritage Site, is a pre-historic site in northern Laos, dotted with about 2,000-year-old menhirs (standing stones) or megaliths, which were unearthed in 1931. Locals refer to it as Sao Hin Tang, meaning "Standing Stone Pillars". It is known as the Stonehenge of Laos, with 2-metre-high (6.6 ft) stones. Apart from these finds, funerary burial sites with artifacts of trinkets, standing rock slabs and stone disks were found. These archaeological finds are older than the Plain of Jars and are seen along a 12-km mountain ridge in the southern part of the province. Local animists believe that the stone discs at the site once sat atop the megaliths and fed Jahn Han, the sky spirit. 11 kilometres (6.8 mi) from Sam Neua is the Ban Tham Buddha Cave. Tat Saloei (Phonesai) Waterfall lies off the road to Nam Noen, about 35 kilometres (22 mi) south of Sam Neua.

Nameuang Hot Springs is another landmark amidst the valley of paddy fields on the way to Xam Neua, where there is the Houaiyad waterfall. The springs are the source of a river. In Houaiyad village, crashed aircraft parts and cans of war relics are recycled into belts.

== Villages ==
- Ban Kenpha

== Gallery ==
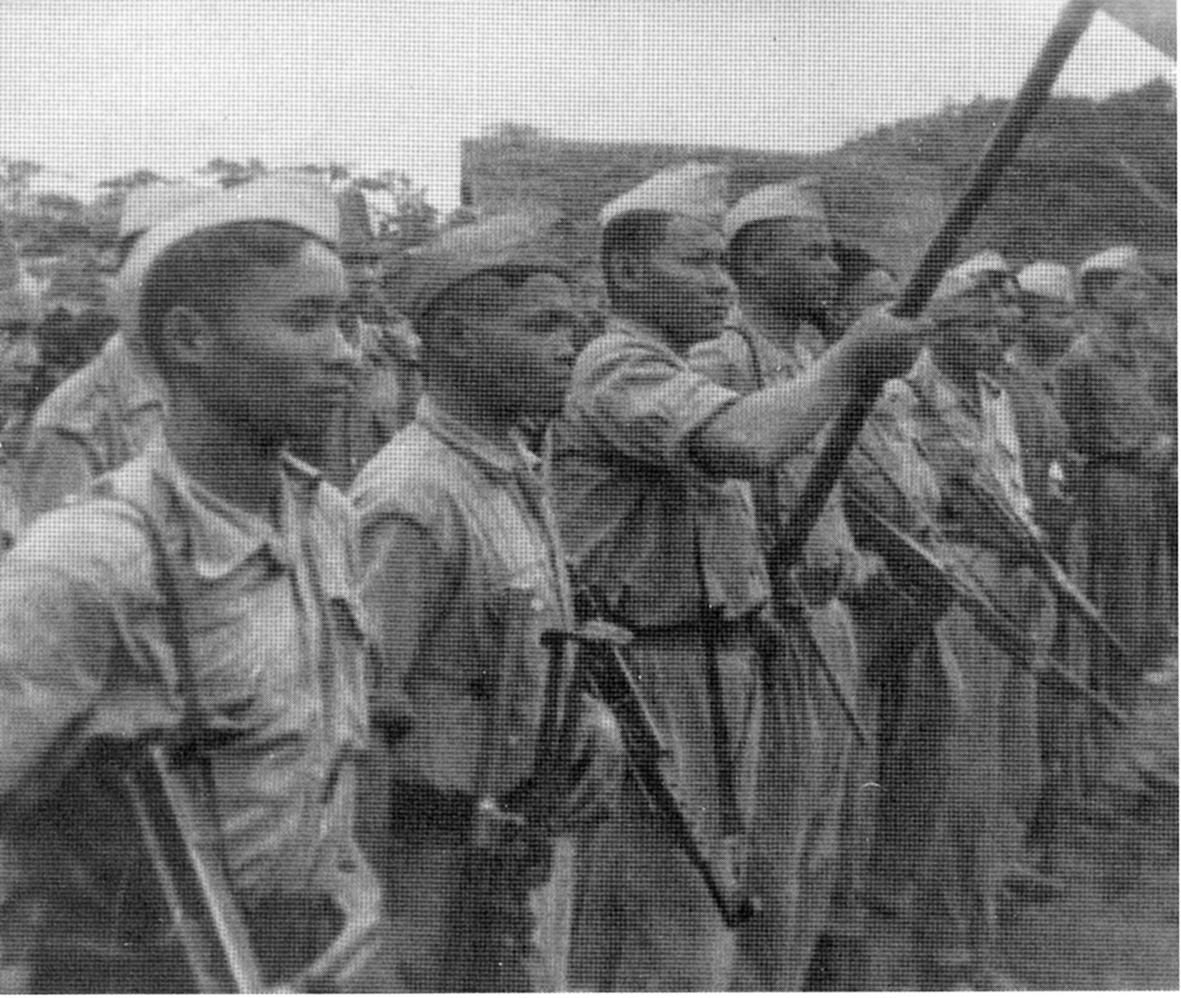
Pathet Lao, Xam Neua, 1953.

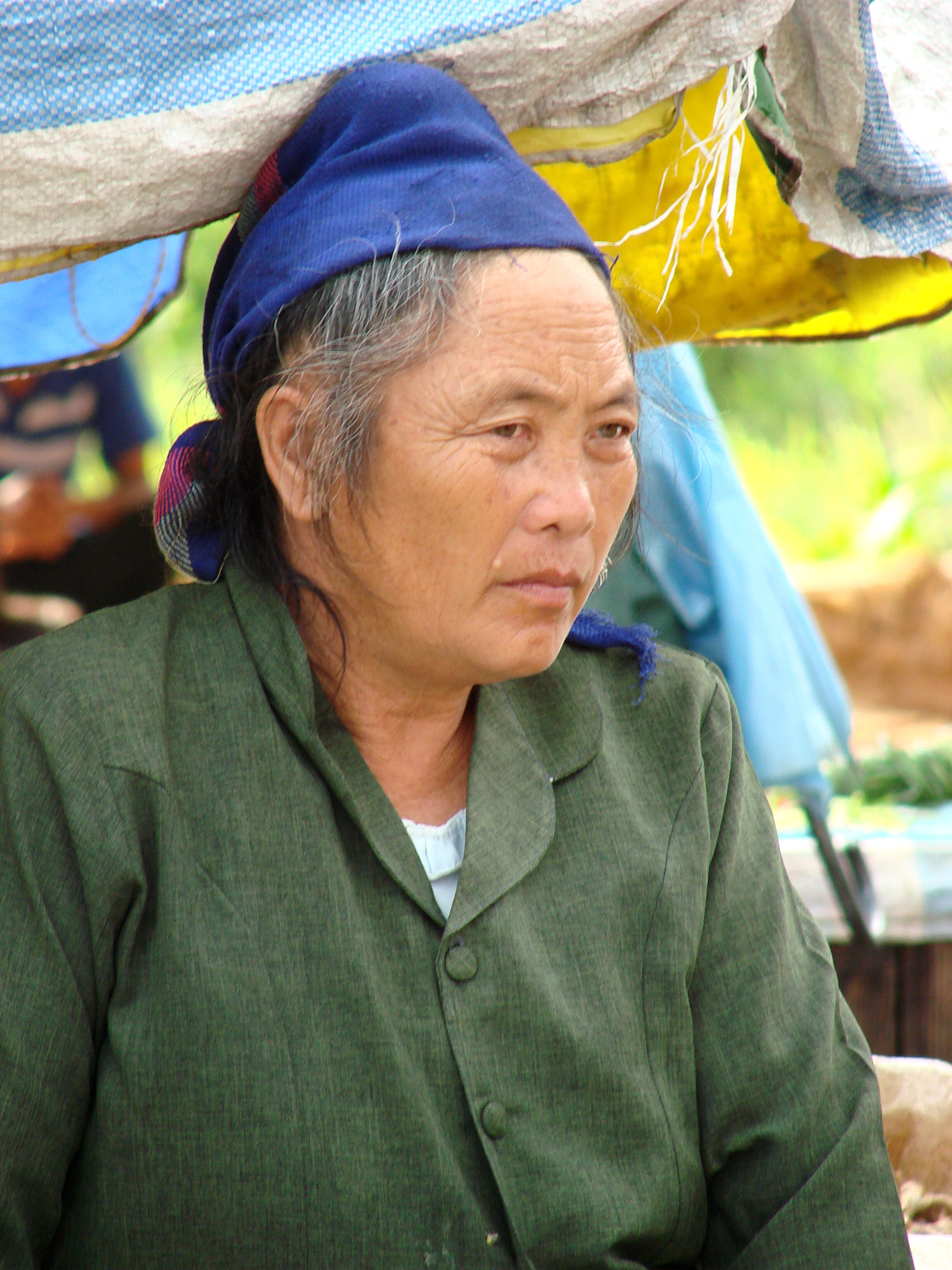
Market vendor, Xam Neua

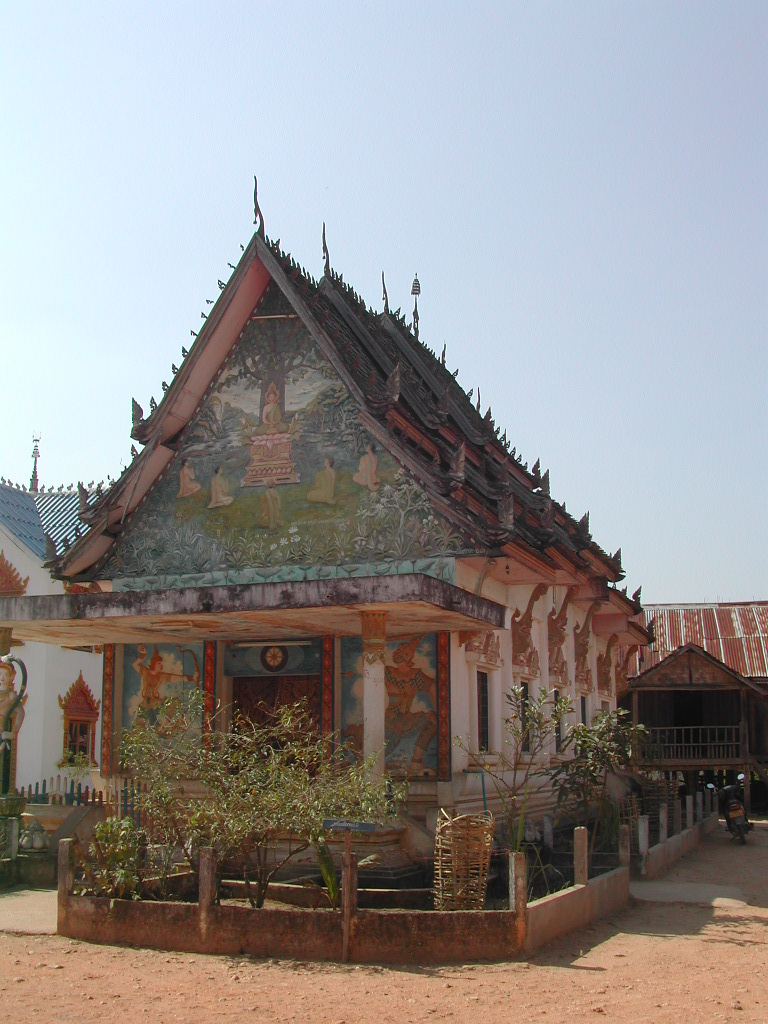
Wat Pho Xai, Xam Neua

== General and cited references ==
- Auzias, Dominique; Labourdette, Jean-Paul (28 March 2012). Laos 2012–2013 (in French). Petit Futé. ISBN 978-2-7469-5375-8.
- Burke, Andrew; Vaisutis, Justine (1 August 2007). Laos 6th Edition. Lonely Planet. ISBN 978-1-74104-568-0.
- Hitchcock, Michael (2009). Tourism in Southeast Asia: Challenges and New Directions. NIAS Press. ISBN 978-87-7694-034-8.
- Larkin, Barbara (1 July 2001). International Religious Freedom (2000): Report to Congress by the Department of State. DIANE Publishing. ISBN 978-0-7567-1229-7.
