= Na Mèo =

Na Meo
- Rural commune
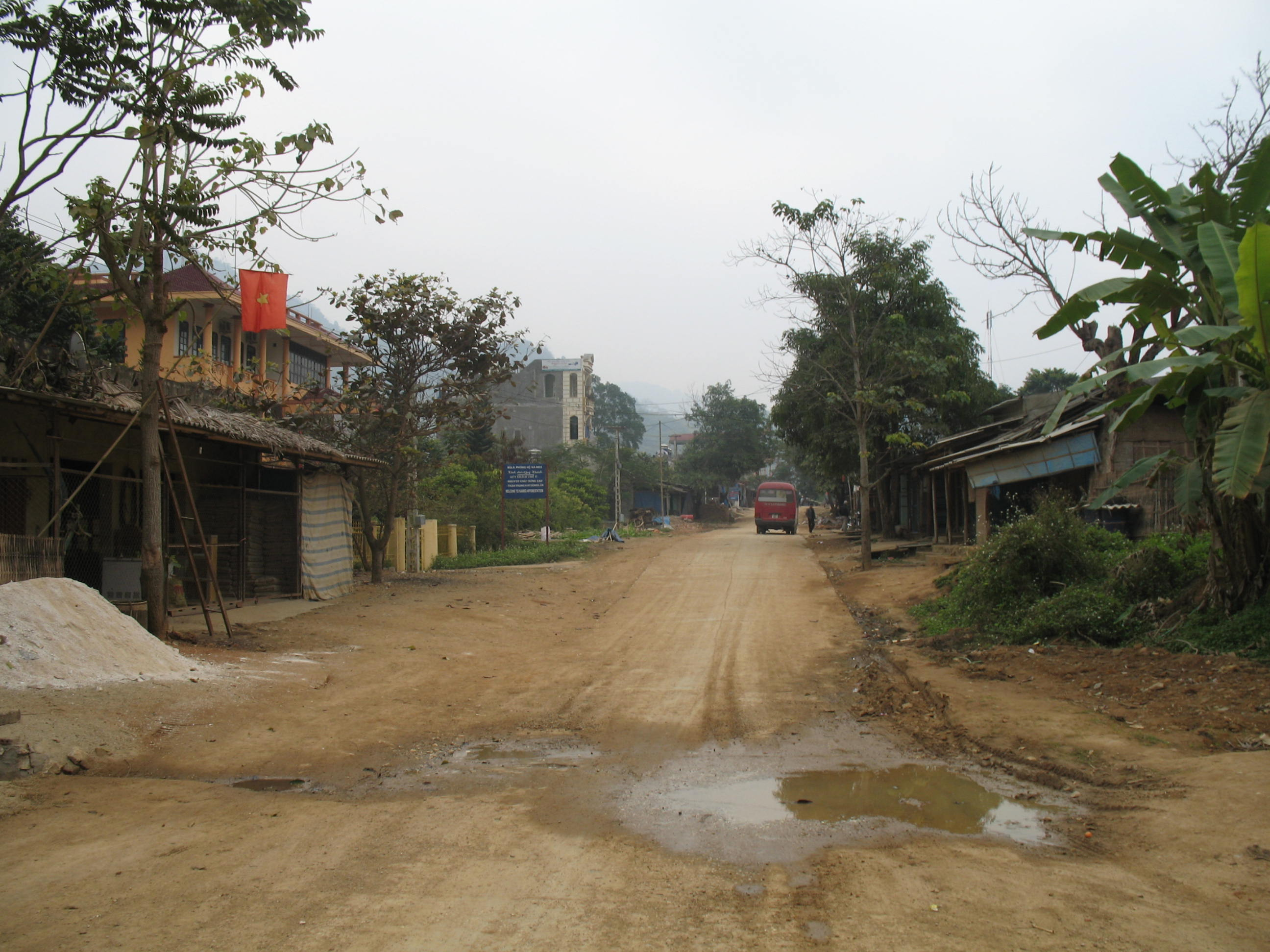

- Location in Vietnam
- Coordinates: 19°55′N 104°51′E
- Country: Vietnam
- Province: Thanh Hóa
- Time zone: UTC+07:00

Na Meo is a rural commune on the border with Laos in Thanh Hóa Province, Vietnam. It lies not far from Nam Xoi, Sam Neua in Laos.

It is often referred to as the Na Maew-Nam Xoi border crossing.
