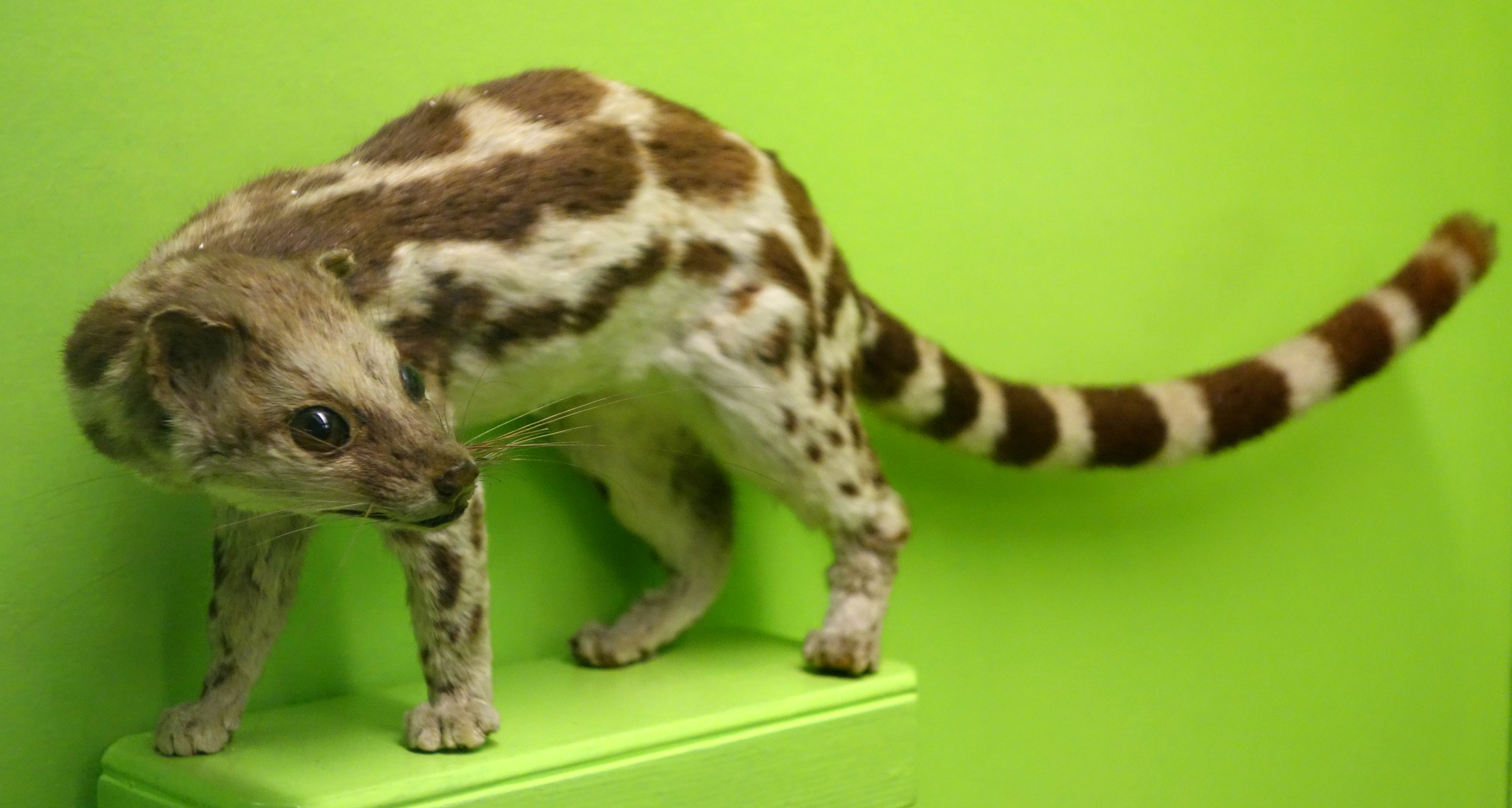

Conservation status
- Least Concern (IUCN 3.1)
- CITES Appendix II

Scientific classification
- Kingdom: Animalia
- Phylum: Chordata
- Class: Mammalia
- Infraclass: Placentalia
- Order: Carnivora
- Family: Prionodontidae
- Genus: Prionodon
- Species: P. linsang

Binomial name
- Prionodon linsang (Hardwicke, 1821)
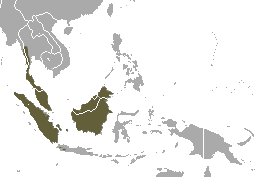
- Banded linsang range

= Banded linsang =

Species of carnivore

The banded linsang (Prionodon linsang) is a linsang, a tree-dwelling carnivorous mammal native to the Sundaic region of Southeast Asia.

== Description ==
The banded linsang is pale yellow with broad stripes on its neck and five dark bands. Its tail has seven to eight dark bands and a dark tip. Its sharp claws are retractile. Its head to body length is 35–41.1 cm (13.8–16.2 in), and its tail is up to 36.2 cm (14.3 in) long. The average weight is around 700 g (25 oz).

== Distribution and habitat ==
The banded linsang occurs in Myanmar, Thailand, Peninsular Malaysia, Java, Bangka and Belitung Islands. Since 2006, it has been recorded by camera traps on the Sunda Islands of Borneo and Sumatra, and in southern Myanmar. It inhabits evergreen forests, deciduous forests, secondary forest at elevations of 11–2,700 m (36–8,858 ft), and was also recorded close to oil palm plantations.

== Ecology and behaviour ==
The banded linsang is nocturnal and usually solitary. It is carnivorous, with its diet consisting of small vertebrates, such as birds, rats, and snakes.

== Taxonomy ==
The two species of Asiatic linsangs were considered to be members of the family Viverridae and to be related to the morphologically similar genets. However, recent genetic taxonomy investigations indicated that the Asiatic linsangs are a sister-group of the Felidae family. It has been proposed that the Asiatic linsangs be placed in the monogeneric family Prionodontidae.
