= Nam Et-Phou Louey National Park =

National park in Laos

- Nam Et Phouloey National Park
- IUCN category II (national park)
- Location within Laos
- Location: Houaphan, Luang Prabang, and Xieng Khouang provinces, Laos
- Coordinates: 20°N 103.3°E
- Area: 4,107.1 km^{2} (1,585.8 sq mi)
- Max. elevation: 2,257 m (7,405 ft)
- Min. elevation: 400 m (1,300 ft)
- Designation: National
- Designated: 2019
- Named for: Nam Et River and Phou Louey ("Forever Mountain")
- Administrator: Ministry of Agriculture and Forestry (MAF)
- Website: www.namet.org/wp/

Nam Et-Phou Louey National Park is a protected area in northern Laos, covering 4,107.1 km^{2} (1,585.8 sq mi) in three provinces: Houaphan, Luang Prabang, and Xieng Khouang. It was designated a national park in 2019, and was previously designated a national protected area. The protected area included a 3,000 km^{2} (1,200 sq mi) core area where human access and wildlife harvest is prohibited and a 2,950 km^{2} buffer area where pre-existing villages are allocated land for subsistence living.

The park consists mainly of mountains and hills, with elevations ranging from 400 and 2257 metres. The area is the source of many rivers, including tributaries of the Mekong and the Mã. It is named after the Nam Et River and Phou Louey Mountain ('Forever Mountain').

The park has a tropical monsoon climate, and average annual rainfall ranges from 1400 to 1800 mm. There is a rainy season from May to October, and a dry season lasting the rest of the year.

Villagers living in the Nam Et-Phou Louey National Park include Tai Dam, Tai Daeng, Tai Kao, Tai Puan, Tai Lue, Tai Yuan, Khmu, Hmong Kao, Hmong Lai, and Yao.

Viengthong, a small town in Houaphan Province, is the site of the park headquarters and visitor centre, where tours into the park can be organised. The town has basic accommodation and a handful of restaurants. There are many biking and walking trails, as well as hot springs.

== Flora and fauna ==
The predominant plant communities in the park are dry evergreen forest and semi-evergreen forest, with extensive areas of scrubland and secondary forest resulting human disturbance. The park covers portions of three forest ecoregions, the Luang Prabang montane rain forests, Northern Indochina subtropical forests, and Northern Thailand–Laos moist deciduous forests.

The area has a high level of biodiversity and endangered species including tiger, leopard, clouded leopard, Asian golden cat, marbled cat, civet, gaur, Sambar deer, white-cheeked gibbon, sun bear, black bear, Asian elephant, dhole, hornbill, and three species of otter. There are no records or evidence of tigers in the park since 2013, which means they are extinct in all of Laos. Leopards vanished from the park even earlier.

== Ecotourism ==
The only access for visitors to see the park is by doing a tour organized by the area ecotourism unit.

Nam Nern Night Safari boat tour (24-hour overnight tour) — This innovative and adventurous journey by traditional long-tail boat offers nature activities that include bird watching, wildlife tracking, nighttime wildlife spotting, medicinal plant exploration, and moderate hiking. This tour won the prestigious 'World Responsible Tourism Award' at the World Travel Mart in London, England, in 2013 and 2014.

Trekking Tours The Nests (two or three days) is a family-friendly hike with overnights in cozy spherical baskets hanging from the trees. The trip is perfect to enjoy wildlife viewing from the observation tower (under construction) at the nearby Poung Nyied salt lick, which attracts animals such as the rare Sambar deer from far and wide.

Trekking Tours Cloud Forest Climb (four or five days including 'The Nests') is a hiking trail to the summit of Phou Louey to one of the few cloud forests in the region. It is an option for the more adventurous. The hike goes through the evergreen forest and offers a rare opportunity to track wild species such as white-cheeked gibbon, leopards, bears and wild dogs using camera traps, which are set up along the trail and maintained by tourists.

For more information contact the protected area headquarters.

== See also ==
- Protected areas of Laos
