= VNeID =

Official digital identity platform of Vietnam

- Original author: Ministry of Public Security of Vietnam
- Developer: National Population Data Center (Trung tâm dữ liệu quốc gia về dân cư)
- Release: September 10, 2021; 5 years ago

Stable release(s)
- Android: 2.2.0 / 26 June 2025; 16 months ago
- iOS: 2.2.0 / 26 June 2025; 16 months ago
- Operating system: Android, iOS
- Size: 78 MB
- Available in: Vietnamese, English
- Website: vneid.gov.vn

VNeID, or Vietnam Electronic Identification (Vietnamese: Định danh điện tử), is the official digital identity platform and "super app" from Vietnam's Ministry of Public Security. It's a key part of Vietnam's digital transformation plan to create a digital government, digital economy, and digital society by 2030. The platform uses a central national database for identity, population, and authentication, providing a unified digital ID for everyone in the country.

The main purpose of VNeID is to let users securely store and verify electronic documents, reducing the need for physical paper documents. It aims to be the single point for all online and offline administrative procedures, making interactions more efficient and convenient by cutting down on bureaucratic hurdles and in-person interactions.

VNeID's rollout has been gradual. Initially for Vietnamese citizens, it expanded its features and user base, notably extending services to foreigners residing in Vietnam (including expatriates and long-term residents) starting July 1, 2025. This phased approach allows the government to test and refine the system, ensuring successful integration and modernization of public services for all residents.

== History ==
=== Formation ===
Following earlier applications like Bluezone and PC-COVID, Vietnam's Ministry of Public Security and the Ho Chi Minh City Police Department developed and launched the VNeID app on the afternoon of September 10, 2021. It was created to manage health declarations and domestic travel amidst the escalating COVID-19 pandemic in Ho Chi Minh City.

At the time, the app connected to the national population database to facilitate contact tracing of F0, F1, and F2 cases, as well as to track vaccination and testing status. Users could log in using their phone number along with their national ID card. VNeID was developed for both Android and iOS. When fully updated with the user's information, the app functioned as a travel pass. After September 30, 2021, Ho Chi Minh City authorized the use of VNeID to completely replace all other COVID-19-related travel documents.

=== Development ===
==== Application development phase ====
On the afternoon of October 5, 2021, the Police Department for Administrative Management of Social Order (under the Ministry of Public Security) announced plans to develop several new digital utilities linked to the chip-embedded Citizen Identity Card. These included vaccination information, travel permit verification, social benefit payments, and vehicle registration details. The Ministry also confirmed it was coordinating with the Ministry of Transport to integrate driver's licenses and with Vietnam Social Security to add insurance information, alongside other documents like passports and international travel papers. According to the Ministry, citizens would only need to register for an account through the VNeID app or the "suckhoe.dancuquocgia.gov.vn" website to authenticate their information. In late 2021, VNeID was also used to verify the COVID-19 vaccination status of spectators attending a football match between Vietnam and Japan.

On January 6, 2022, Prime Minister Phạm Minh Chính approved Decision 06/QĐ-TTg, a plan for "developing the application of population data, identification, and electronic authentication for the national digital transformation, 2022–2025, with a vision to 2030," which included VNeID. The plan outlined that VNeID could eventually incorporate an e-wallet, support non-cash payments for services like securities, electricity, and water bills, and integrate various physical documents. In late February and early March, the Ministry of Public Security officially began issuing electronic identification (e-ID) accounts to citizens. These accounts were created when individuals applied for a new or replacement chip-embedded Citizen Identity Card and consisted of a username, password, or other authentication methods. Starting in March 2022, health insurance information became accessible through either the chip-embedded ID card or the VNeID app. At the same time, the Ministry of Public Security proposed a draft regulation outlining five groups of individuals who would be ineligible for an e-ID account.

Although the issuance of e-ID accounts had been authorized, the first 10 accounts were not officially granted until July 18, 2022, out of six million pending applications. The e-ID system was structured into two levels: Level 1, which could be self-registered through the VNeID app, and Level 2, which required registration at a police station. The Ministry of Public Security also assured the public that all citizen data would be encrypted to prevent hackers from accessing or stealing information.

On August 9, 2022, VNeID was officially declared the national digital citizen application. Subsequently, on October 20, Decree 59/2022/NĐ-CP came into effect, officially allowing citizens to present their electronic ID on VNeID as a valid substitute for their physical Citizen Identity Card. Foreign nationals could also register to use VNeID as an alternative to their passport or international travel documents. Despite the integration of numerous documents, some features were not yet widely or universally usable. Following the phasing out of physical household registration books and temporary residence books, VNeID was updated to version 2.0.7 in late February 2023, which officially enabled the use of "residency information."

Beginning May 3, 2023, Level 2 VNeID accounts were accepted in place of physical ID cards for domestic air travel. Under the 2023 Law on Citizenship Identity, Vietnamese citizens under the age of six will also be issued an ID card, meaning they will also have an e-ID account managed by their legal representative. In October 2023, VNeID version 2.1.0 was released, adding four main features: a history of previous national ID and Citizen Identity Cards; social insurance participation history; automatic limitation and locking of an e-ID account when the chip-embedded ID card expires; and the Epay e-wallet for electronic toll collection (ETC).

==== Feature integration phase ====
In version 2.1.3, updated on February 29, 2024, VNeID introduced the ability to log in using biometric authentication such as fingerprint or Face ID. Starting March 30, the app allowed users to request criminal record certificates. Additionally, from July 1, social security benefit payments could be processed through the app in certain cases, and the Vietnam Social Security agency officially synchronized user data from its VssID app with VNeID accounts. On the same date, electronic identity card information became displayable within the app, and integrated driver's licenses were legally recognized as a substitute for physical ones. Authorities were also empowered to digitally suspend licenses, with the status updated in VNeID. Furthermore, personal accounts on the National Public Service Portal were deactivated on June 30, requiring users to use their VNeID accounts for all national and ministerial public services in Vietnam.

On December 29, 2024, VNeID launched version 2.1.14, introducing several new features: electronic service of process and civil judgment enforcement notifications from the Supreme People's Court, a driver's license demerit point system, and end-to-end vehicle registration.

VNeID was updated to version 2.2.0, with new features released on June 26, 2025. This significant update introduced additional functions, utilities, and services specifically designed for foreigners, enabling them to access various digital utilities in Vietnam, such as registering to rent a house, storing electronic residence cards, and utilizing public services. Furthermore, the update included revisions to individual, agency, and organizational information based on the new cadastral map, and added public services for issuing and exchanging ID cards for individuals aged 14 and older. Various functions and utilities were also adjusted to enhance convenience for all users, alongside crucial bug fixes from the previous version, which ensured stable access and correct information post-mergers.

In September 2025, the Ministry of Public Security integrated a nationwide wanted persons lookup feature into VNeID level-2 accounts, allowing verified citizens to search for individuals wanted by police authorities across Vietnam using name, date of birth, or citizen identity number. This function displays basic information including photographs, wanted notices, issuing authorities, and contact details of investigating agencies, aiming to mobilize public assistance in locating fugitives while enhancing transparency in law enforcement.

== Purpose and scope ==
The main goals of VNeID are to simplify public services, cut down on paperwork and in-person visits, improve identity verification, and protect user rights in digital transactions.

=== Eligibility for use ===
VNeID is designed for broad use across various groups:

- Vietnamese Citizens: All citizens can get VNeID accounts. Those 14 and older can get Level-1 and Level-2. Children aged 6–13 can get Level-1 or Level-2 if needed, and those under 6 can get Level-1.
- Foreign Individuals: As of July 1, 2025, foreigners with valid residence cards in Vietnam can register for Level-2 eID accounts. Similar to citizens, foreigners aged 6 and above can get Level-1 or Level-2, and under 6 can get Level-1. This is important for foreigners accessing services.
- Organizations and Businesses: Any registered organization or business in Vietnam can get an eID account. From July 1, 2025, businesses mostly need VNeID for public services, as old portal accounts are invalid. The company's legal representative must have a personal Level-2 e-ID.

=== e-ID account levels ===
VNeID uses a tiered system for electronic identification accounts, offering different levels of digital identity and access:

- Level 1 eID: Offers basic digital identification.
- Level 2 eID: Provides a more complete digital identity, required for most digital public services. Registering for Level 2 needs biometric data (photo, fingerprints) verified against national databases (e.g., immigration database) for security.

The tiered e-ID system, especially the biometric data requirement for Level 2 (even for foreign residents), shows the Ministry of Public Security's focus on strong identity verification and central data management. This boosts security and reduces fraud by creating a reliable authentication method. Collecting and verifying biometric data builds a central digital profile for each person, making data management efficient and reducing redundant paperwork. The Ministry's direct role in VNeID's development and data centralization highlights the Vietnamese government's control over the digital identity infrastructure, enabling capabilities for identity management, security, and oversight. This secure, central biometric system is crucial for advanced digital government services across sectors like finance, healthcare, and public administration.

== Key features and services ==
=== Document storage and presentation ===
A core feature is its ability to store and present electronic versions of many official documents, reducing the need for physical copies. These include:

- Citizen and foreigner ID cards
- Driver's licenses and vehicle registration
- Health insurance cards and electronic health records
- Passports
- Birth and marriage certificates
- Social insurance documents
- Electronic residence cards for foreign nationals

=== Government and administrative services ===
The application offers a wide range of government and administrative functionalities to streamline interactions. Users can apply for residence permits, request criminal records (significantly reducing processing times), register temporary or permanent residency, pay traffic fines, manage driving records, and access national education platforms. It also provides digital tools for Party Congress management.

=== Financial services ===
VNeID is crucial for digital financial transactions in Vietnam. It allows opening bank accounts via biometric verification, connects with major banks and e-wallets, and provides access to tax applications. Users can also generate digital signatures within the app for transactions like loan applications.

=== Healthcare and everyday use ===
The app extends to healthcare and daily life. It enables online purchase of prescription medicine, stores and facilitates use of health insurance and electronic health records for medical professionals, and supports travel-related functions like flight booking and online check-in.

=== Social integration ===
VNeID helps integrate various social aspects digitally, including marriage status, social benefits, and pensions.

=== Future integrations ===
VNeID is continuously evolving, with plans to integrate more "super app" features like utility payments (electricity, water), broader e-wallets, cashless payment functionalities, and social support programs (pensions, unemployment benefits, disaster relief).

== Challenges ==
=== Privacy concerns and data security risks ===
While VNeID developers prioritize data privacy and user consent for information sharing, the extensive collection of personal data raises significant privacy considerations. A major risk identified by authorities is the careless sharing of VNeID screenshots on social media. Users have inadvertently exposed sensitive information, such as identification numbers, when sharing updated personal details like birthplace and residence without blurring critical data. Cybersecurity experts warn that publicizing such information makes users vulnerable to digital crimes, including fraud, impersonation, and identity theft. Modern technologies, particularly artificial intelligence (AI), can be used by criminals to create comprehensive profiles of potential targets.

=== Security threats and fraud attempts ===
The shift to digital platforms like VNeID has also led to an increase in sophisticated cyber threats. The Cybersecurity and High-Tech Crime Prevention Department of the Ministry of Public Security has issued warnings about fraudulent schemes specifically targeting VNeID users. Scammers often impersonate officials from local government entities, using spoofed phone numbers or hotlines to trick residents into clicking malicious links or installing fake VNeID applications containing malware. These criminals may already possess some personal data, which they leverage to build trust before directing victims to compromised links or apps. Once downloaded, these malicious applications can allow hackers to gain control of devices, harvest one-time password (OTP) codes, or exploit facial recognition data to access banking applications and steal funds. To counter these threats, the Ministry advises citizens to never follow instructions from unknown callers claiming to be local officials and to always visit local police offices directly for administrative updates. If a suspicious link is clicked or a fake app installed, immediate contact with the bank to lock accounts and powering off the device are recommended actions.

=== Adoption challenges ===
Achieving widespread adoption for VNeID faces several obstacles:

- Digital Divide and Infrastructure: In some rural and remote areas, there is a lack of digital government infrastructure, contributing to a significant digital divide. Many citizens in these regions, particularly ethnic minorities, may be illiterate or lack access to smartphones, hindering their ability to use VNeID. This disparity means that the benefits of digitalization may not reach all Vietnamese citizens.
- Digital Literacy and Skills Gap: A lack of digital skills or general digital literacy can act as a barrier to the adoption and proper use of digital technologies like VNeID. While efforts are underway to improve digital skills and promote digital literacy, this remains an ongoing challenge.
- User Resistance to Change: Employees and citizens may resist adopting new digital systems, preferring existing tools and processes due to fear of disruption or a lack of perceived value. Poor onboarding, insufficient training, and a lack of ongoing support can worsen this resistance. For example, in telehealth initiatives, patient registration was low because the full benefits compared to existing communication platforms were not yet apparent.
- Quality and Reliability of Services: In some cases, a perceived lack of quality and reliable digital government services can deter adoption. For a digital tool to be widely accepted, it must consistently demonstrate greater helpfulness and efficiency than existing alternatives.

== Sources ==
- Dang, Han (2025). "Electronic Identification and collecting data (VneID - Vietnam Electronic Identification)". Advanced Smart Home and City Technologies for Sustainable and Intelligent Living (PDF) (Bachelor of Business Administration thesis). LAB University of Applied Sciences. pp. 16–19.
