= Vietnam Baseball Championship =

Annual baseball tournament in Vietnam

Vietnam Baseball Championship Giải vô địch các câu lạc bộ bóng chày Toàn quốc
- Current season, competition or edition: 2026 Vietnam Baseball Championship
- Sport: Baseball
- Founded: December 2021; 4 years ago
- First season: 2022
- Organising body: Vietnam Baseball and Softball Federation
- No. of teams: 10 (2026)
- Country: Vietnam
- Most recent champion: Saigon Storm (2026)
- Most titles: Saigon Storm (3 titles)

The Vietnam Baseball Championship (Vietnamese: Giải vô địch các câu lạc bộ bóng chày Toàn quốc, lit. 'National Baseball Club Championship'), formerly known as the National Baseball Club Cup, is an annual baseball tournament in Vietnam. Sanctioned by the Vietnam Baseball and Softball Federation (VSBF), it is the first official national tournament for domestic clubs in Vietnam, where the winners are recognized as national champions.

Since its debut in 2022, the tournament has had five editions, participating teams from five Vietnamese cities and three different club champions crowned in its history.

== Format ==
Games are played in 7 innings or 150 minutes. No new inning can begin after 120 minutes. If a game remains tied after said time and inning limits, it will head into extras. Mercy rule applies in the tournament, in which a game is called after the 4th inning should the run difference is upwards of 10 runs.

Most editions of the tournament feature a round robin group stage where teams are split into 2 pools, from each of which 2 teams advance to the single-elimination semifinals and finals. No third-place game is held.

The 2023 edition was the only tournament so far to be played in a double-elimination bracket of 11 teams.

Starting in 2023, the tournament solely consists of players of Vietnamese nationality, with foreign nationals excluded from competition.

== Results ==
Edition	Host	Winner	Score		Runner-up	Third place	
2022	HCMC	Ho Chi Minh City II	12	4	Hanoi Archers A	Hanoi Capitals	ULIS Devil Bats
2023	Hanoi	Saigon Storm	15	11	Hanoi Archers	Ho Chi Minh City Thunder	HUST Red Owls
2024	Danang	Cong An Nhan Dan	7	5	Saigon Storm	Hanoi Archers	Ho Chi Minh City Thunder
2025	HCMC	Hanoi Archers	8	7	Saigon Storm	Cong An Nhan Dan	Ho Chi Minh City Thunder
2026	Hanoi	Saigon Storm	15	4	Cong An Nhan Dan	Hanoi Archers	Ho Chi Minh City Thunder

== Teams ==
Team	Apps.	Debut	Most recent	Best result
Cong An Nhan Dan	5	2022	2026	Winner (2024)
Danang Lemaeus	5	2022	2026	Pool stage
Hanoi Archers	5	2022	2026	Winner (2025)
Ho Chi Minh City Thunder	5	2022	2026	3rd (2023, 2024, 2025, 2026)
Ho Chi Minh City Pioneers	3	2022	2026	Pool stage
Huế - CBC	3	2024	2026	Pool stage
HUST Red Owls	4	2023	2026	3rd (2023)
Nha Trang Swallow	3	2024	2026	Pool stage
Saigon Storm	5	2022	2026	Winner (2022, 2023, 2026)
ULIS Devil Bats	5	2022	2026	3rd (2022)
Danang Whales	1	2024	2024	Pool stage
Alligator	3	2022	2026	Pool stage
Hanoi-Amsterdam Phoenix	1	2023	2023	Pool stage
Hanoi Phantoms	1	2023	2023	Pool stage

== See more ==
- Hanoi Baseball League
- Ho Chi Minh City Baseball League
- Vietnam national baseball team
