= Vietnam Baseball and Softball Federation =

Vietnamese national sports governing body

- Sport: Baseball, Softball, Baseball5
- Jurisdiction: Vietnam
- Abbreviation: VBSF
- Founded: 2021
- Affiliation: WBSC
- Regional affiliation: WBSC Asia
- Chairman: Tran Duc Phan

Official website
- vbsfvietnam.com
- (Vietnam)

The Vietnam Baseball and Softball Federation (VBSF) is the national governing body of baseball, softball and baseball5 in Vietnam. The association was established in 2021.

== History ==
The World Baseball Softball Confederation showed support for a new Baseball Softball Federation in Vietnam in 2019, hoping to promote softball and Baseball5 alongside the existing presence of baseball. The national federation also organizes the amateur Vietnam National Baseball Club Championship.

The VBSF was established in April 2021. It plans to promote Baseball5 in school curricula as well as at national sports festivals for K-12 students. The general growth of baseball in Vietnam has been supported by financial investments and pop culture connections from East Asia, such as through manga.
