= Vietnamese nationality law =

Vietnamese Nationality Law

12th National Assembly of Vietnam
- Citation: 24/2008/QH12
- Enacted: 2008

Amended by
- Law amending and supplementing a number of articles of the Vietnamese Nationality Law (No. 56/2014/QH13)

Vietnamese Nationality Law (Vietnamese: Luật Quốc tịch Việt Nam) is the law on Vietnamese nationality enacted by the National Assembly of Vietnam. A person with Vietnamese nationality is a Vietnamese citizen. Vietnamese nationality represents the rights and obligations between an individual and the state, and vice versa. Nationality is primarily conferred by descent (jus sanguinis). Vietnam officially recognizes only one nationality, but does not prohibit dual or multiple citizenships; acquiring a foreign nationality does not automatically strip one of Vietnamese citizenship.

== History ==
The concept of Vietnamese nationality existed implicitly but was neither formally recognized nor legally codified throughout Vietnam's medieval history, even though civil registration (hộ tịch) had been in place since the Trần dynasty. Systematic and scientific management of civil status records only began during the French colonial period.

Under French colonial rule, Vietnamese people were considered to hold French Indochinese (Fédération indochinoise) nationality. Vietnamese nationality only formally came into existence following the establishment of the Democratic Republic of Vietnam. Decree No. 53 of 1945, issued by President Ho Chi Minh of the Provisional Revolutionary Government, was the first official legal document defining Vietnamese nationality. The decree states:

The following persons shall be considered Vietnamese citizens:

1. A person whose father is a Vietnamese citizen;
2. A person whose father is unknown or stateless and whose mother is a Vietnamese citizen;
3. A person born on Vietnamese territory whose parents are unknown or stateless.

This decree was issued on 20 October 1945, before the country was divided, and therefore had legal validity across the entire Vietnamese territory. It is regarded as the original and sole legal foundation for Vietnamese nationality recognized internationally.

The unified National Assembly of Vietnam first enacted the Law on Vietnamese Nationality in 1988. Since then, the following legal instruments have regulated Vietnamese nationality:

- Law on Vietnamese Nationality 1988 (Luật Quốc tịch Việt Nam 1988)
- Law on Vietnamese Nationality 1988 (No. 07/1998/QH10)
- Law on Vietnamese Nationality 2008 (Luật Quốc tịch Việt Nam 2008, No. 24/2008/QH12)
- Law Amending and Supplementing a Number of Articles of the Law on Vietnamese Nationality (Luật sửa đổi, bổ sung một số điều của Luật Quốc tịch Việt Nam, No. 56/2014/QH13)

== See also ==
- Vietnamese passport
- Visa requirements for Vietnamese citizens
- Works related to Law on Vietnamese Nationality at Wikisource
