= Vietnamese identity card =

Identity Card (Căn cước)
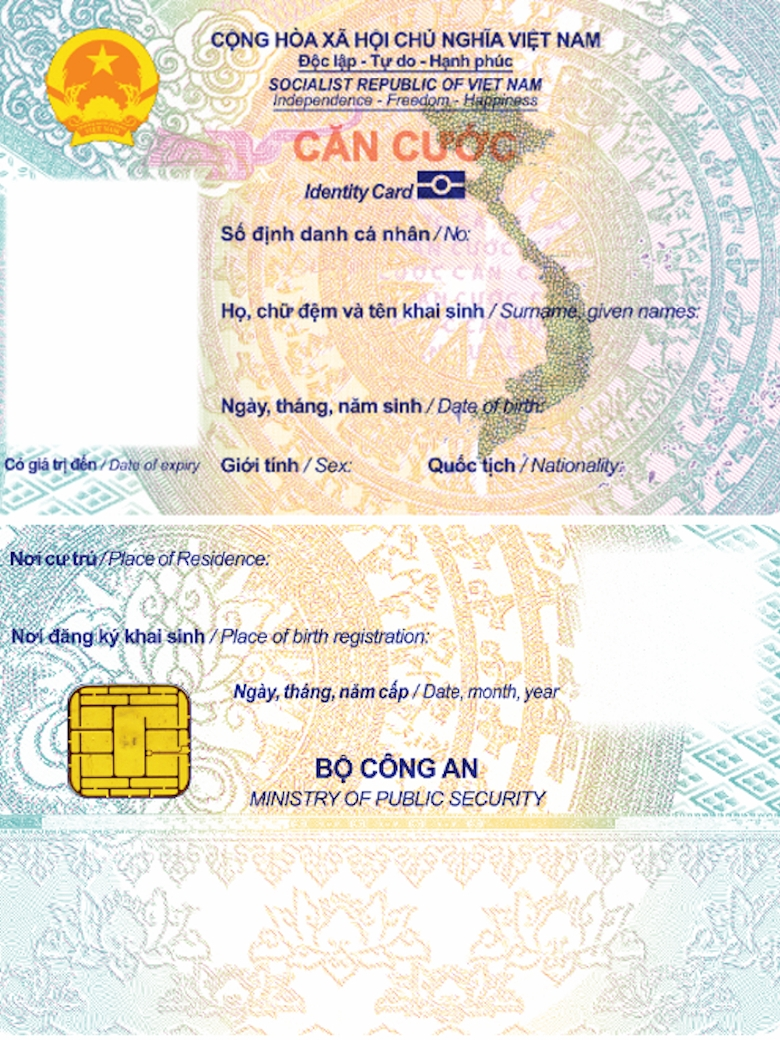
- Blank Identity Card template
- Type: Identity card
- Issued by: Ministry of Public Security
- Valid in: Vietnam

Identity Card (Vietnamese: Căn cước - CC), formerly designated as the Citizen Identity Card (CIC; Căn cước công dân - CCCD), also publicly known as an incarnation of the People's Identity Card (Vietnamese: Chứng minh nhân dân - CMND), is the principal ID card and one of the main types of identification documents of Vietnamese citizens. This is a new form of identity card, effective from January 1, 2016. According to the 2014 Citizen Identification Law, people aged 14 and over will be issued an identity card.

== History ==
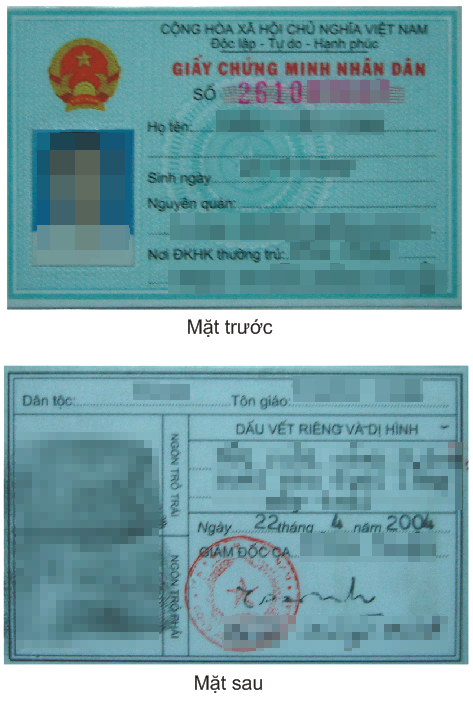
Front and back of a People's Identity Card

In Vietnam identity cards were used during the French colonial period (before 1945) as a passport or identification card within the entire Indochina.

According to Decree No. 175 - b dated September 6, 1946 of the President of the Democratic Republic of Vietnam, the Citizen Card (Vietnamese: Thẻ Công Dân) was used instead of the ID card. The Citizen Card certifies the personal identity and specific characteristics of each citizen, including full name, date of birth, parents' names, place of origin, residence, occupation issued by the People's Committee of the commune, town or city where the citizen's place of origin or residence is to Vietnamese citizens aged 18 and over.

Since 1957, the Citizen Card has been replaced by the Identity Card (Vietnamese: Giấy Chứng Minh). In 1964, the "Identity Certificate" (Vietnamese: Giấy chứng nhận căn cước) was added for people from 14 to 17 years old in addition to the "Identity Card".

In South Vietnam, identity cards were widely used until the end of April 1975.

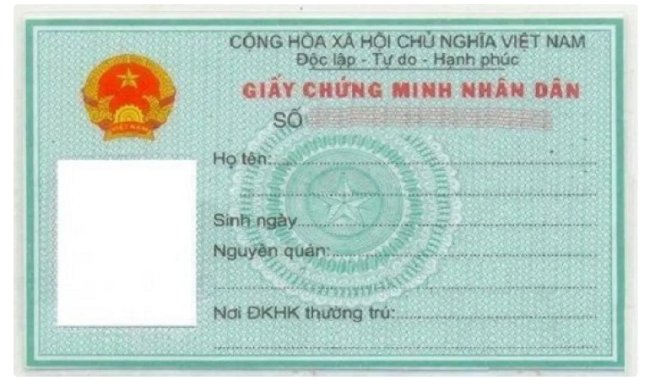
Blank old People's Identity Card template

Since the reunification of the country after the war in 1976, the People's Identity Card (Vietnamese: Giấy Chứng Minh Nhân Dân) has been used uniformly throughout the country. Since 1999, it has been replaced by the new People's Identity Card (Vietnamese: Chứng Minh Nhân Dân) according to the regulations of the Government of the Socialist Republic of Vietnam.

Starting from July 1, 2012, the Ministry of Public Security applied a new plastic People's Identity Card model of 85.6mm x 53.98mm, which clearly states the full names of the father and mother, with a two-dimensional barcode. The citizen's photo is printed directly on the card; the new ID number consists of 12 numbers. Starting in 2016, the People's Identity Card was officially replaced by the card-size Citizen Identity Card (Vietnamese: Căn cước công dân). However, at the provincial and district police levels, the procedures for issuing, exchanging and reissuing the People's Identity Card were still carried out until October 30, 2017, when it was officially abolished. From January 1, 2025, old-style identity cards are no longer valid. Unlike the previous ID card number, the 12-digit code printed on the identity card (officially called the personal identification number or also known as the TCC code) will never change, even if people reissue it due to loss or change of permanent residence information.

The 2023 Law on Identification stipulates the expansion and integration of many other information of citizens and people of Vietnamese origin in other databases into the National Population Database and the Identification Database compared to the 2014 Law on Identification to directly serve the application of the utility of identification cards, electronic identification, connection, and sharing of people's information. The 2023 Law on Identification also stipulates the contents on the identification card, including changing the name of the card "Citizen Identification" to "Identification". The Law has also been amended and supplemented in the direction of removing fingerprints and amending the regulations on information on the identification card number.

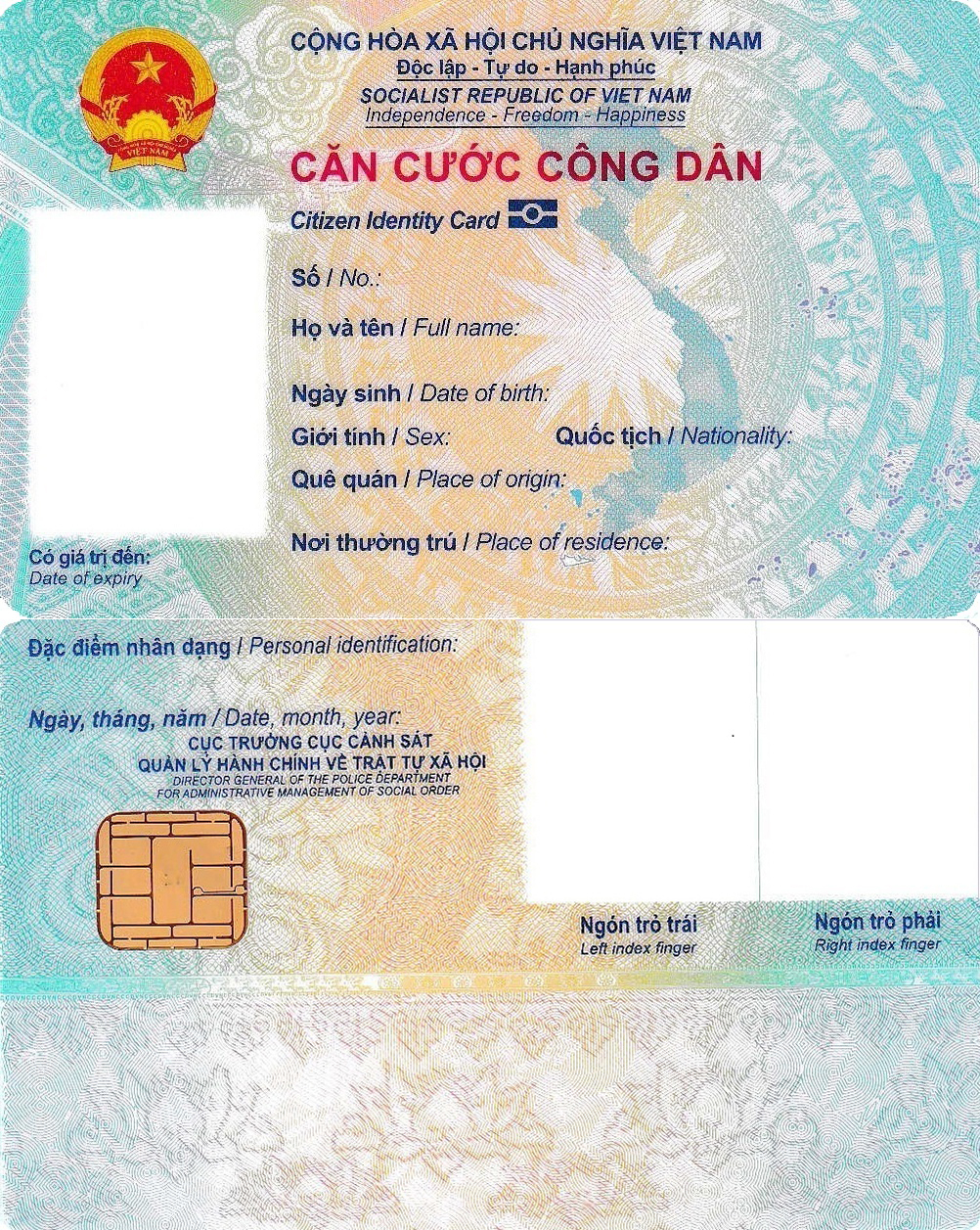
Front and back of Citizen Identification Card with electronic chip

== Design ==
The front of the Citizen Identity Card (chip-based) includes information in Vietnamese language, with English language as a secondary language:

- National emblem, motto
- QR code
- Photo of the cardholder:
- Personal identification number:
- Full birth name:
- Date of birth:
- Gender:
- Nationality:
- Native place:
- Place of permanent residence:
- Expiration date:

Back of the card

- Encrypted information storage component (electronic chip)
- Index fingerprint, identifying characteristics of the cardholder;
- Identifying features:
- Date of issue;
- Full name, title, and signature of the issuer;
- Seal of the issuing authority:
- MRZ line

The identity card number is also the personal identification number. Each citizen is issued a unique, non-repeating personal identification number. The citizen identity card must be renewed when the citizen reaches 25, 40, and 60 years of age.

With the goal of building an e-government and creating a breakthrough in the country's socio-economic development; contributing to the effective fight against counterfeiting crimes, starting from November 2020, citizen identity cards have been equipped with electronic chips instead of barcodes.

According to new regulations in the 2023 Law on Identification, the content on the Identity Card includes encrypted information and information printed on the card:

a) Image of the National Emblem of the Socialist Republic of Vietnam;

b) The words “CỘNG HÒA XÃ HỘI CHỦ NGHĨA VIỆT NAM, Độc lập - Tự do - Hạnh phúc” (SOCIALIST REPUBLIC OF VIETNAM, Independence - Freedom - Happiness);

c) The word “CĂN CƯỚC” (IDENTIFICATION);

d) Facial photo;

đ) Personal identification number;

e) Surname, middle name, and birth name;

g) Date of birth;

h) Gender;

i) Place of birth registration/Place of birth;

k) Nationality;

l) Place of residence;

m) Date of issue and expiration date;

n) Issuing authority: Ministry of Public Security;

p) MRZ line.

Thus, compared to the CCCD card format, the Identity Card has removed the "native place" field, replacing it with "place of birth registration" or "place of birth" and "place of residence"; it also removed fingerprints and identifying features.

== Structure of the Personal Identification Number (ID card number, electronic identification account number) ==
Decree 137/2015/NĐ-CP dated December 31, 2015, issued by the Government providing detailed guidance on several articles of the Law on Citizen Identification, stipulates that the personal identification number is a natural sequence of 12 digits. Its structure consists of 6 digits representing the birth century code, gender code, citizen's birth year code, and the code for the province, centrally-governed city, or country where the citizen registered their birth, followed by 6 digits as a random number range.

Province/City codes for the Citizen Identification (CCCD) number:

0x	1x	2x	3x	4x	5x	6x	7x	8x	9x
00 - Reserved	10 - Lào Cai	20 - Lạng Sơn	30 - Hải Dương	40 - Nghệ An	50 - Reserved	60 - Bình Thuận	70 - Bình Phước	80 - Long An	90 - Reserved
01 - Hanoi City	11 - Điện Biên	21 - Reserved	31 - Haiphong City	41 - Reserved	51 - Quảng Ngãi	61 - Reserved	71 - Reserved	81 - Reserved	91 - Kiên Giang
02 - Hà Giang	12 - Lai Châu	22 - Quảng Ninh	32 - Reserved	42 - Hà Tĩnh	52 - Bình Định	62 - Kon Tum	72 - Tây Ninh	82 - Tiền Giang	92 - Can Tho City
03 - Reserved	13 - Reserved	23 - Reserved	33 - Hưng Yên	43 - Reserved	53 - Reserved	63 - Reserved	73 - Reserved	83 - Bến Tre	93 - Hậu Giang
04 - Cao Bằng	14 - Sơn La	24 - Bắc Giang	34 - Thái Bình	44 - Quảng Bình	54 - Phú Yên	64 - Gia Lai	74 - Bình Dương	84 - Trà Vinh	94 - Sóc Trăng
05 - Reserved	15 - Yên Bái	25 - Phú Thọ	35 - Hà Nam	45 - Quảng Trị	55 - Reserved	65 - Reserved	75 - Đồng Nai	85 - Reserved	95 - Bạc Liêu
06 - Bắc Kạn	16 - Reserved	26 - Vĩnh Phúc	36 - Nam Định	46 - Thừa Thiên-Huế	56 - Khánh Hòa	66 - Đắk Lắk	76 - Reserved	86 - Vĩnh Long	96 - Cà Mau
07 - Reserved	17 - Hòa Bình	27 - Bắc Ninh	37 - Ninh Bình	47 - Reserved	57 - Reserved	67 - Đắk Nông	77 - Bà Rịa-Vũng Tàu	87 - Đồng Tháp	97 - Reserved
08 - Tuyên Quang	18 - Reserved	28 - Reserved (formerly old Hà Tây)	38 - Thanh Hóa	48 - Da Nang City	58 - Ninh Thuận	68 - Lâm Đồng	78 - Reserved	88 - Reserved	98 - Reserved
09 - Reserved	19 - Thái Nguyên	29 - Reserved	39 - Reserved	49 - Quảng Nam	59 - Reserved	69 - Reserved	79 - Ho Chi Minh City	89 - An Giang	99 - Reserved

=== The structure of the 12 identification numbers on the citizen ID card includes ===
- First 3 characters: Code for the province, centrally-governed city, or country where the citizen registered their birth.

- 4th character: Gender code based on the birth century code.

- 20th Century (from 1901 to the end of 2000): Male 0, Female 1;
- 21st Century (from 2001 to the end of 2100): Male 2, Female 3;

- 5th and 6th characters: Citizen's birth year code (i.e., the last 2 digits of the birth year).

Example:
- Citizen born in 1987: code 87
- Citizen born in 2020: code 20

- Last 6 characters: A random number from 000001 to 999999

== See also ==
- Vietnamese passport
- Visa requirements for Vietnamese citizens
