= Vietnamese passport =

Passport issued to citizens of Vietnam

Vietnamese passport; Hộ chiếu Việt Nam
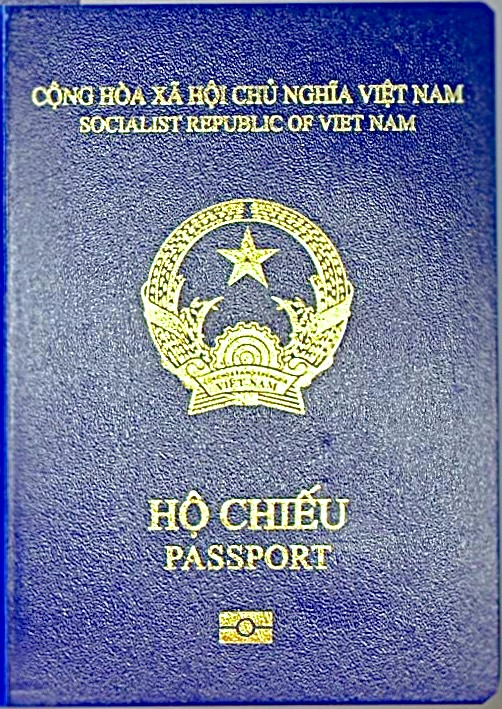
- The front cover of a Vietnamese biometric passport.
- Type: Passport
- Issued by: Departure of Immigration, Ministry of Public Security; Diplomatic missions of Vietnam
- First issued: 1959 (first version); 2001 (MRP); 1 July 2022 (current version); 1 March 2023 (biometric)
- Purpose: Identification, proof of citizenship
- Eligibility: Vietnamese citizenship
- Expiration: 10 years or 5 years 5 years for age under 14
- Cost: VNĐ100,000 for new passport issuance VNĐ200,000 for re-issuance due to damage or loss

Vietnamese passports (Vietnamese: Hộ chiếu Việt Nam, Standard Vietnamese IPA: [hôˀ cîəw vîətˀ nām]) are issued to citizens of Vietnam to facilitate international travel. They enable the bearer to exit and re-enter Vietnam freely; to travel to and from other countries in accordance with visa requirements, and secure assistance from Vietnamese consular officials when abroad, if necessary.

All Vietnamese passports are issued by the Department of Immigration (Cục Quản lý Xuất nhập cảnh) on behalf of the Ministry of Public Security. Only Vietnamese citizens are eligible for this passport. The passport is valid for ten years. By law, a valid unexpired Vietnamese passport is conclusive proof of Vietnamese citizenship, and therefore can be used in lieu of a National ID card for identification (such as flying within Vietnam) domestically.

Vietnamese passport booklets conform with the recommended standards (i.e. size, composition, layout, technology) of the International Civil Aviation Organization (ICAO). There are three types of passport booklets. Vietnamese passports are property of the government of Vietnam and must be returned to the Vietnamese government upon demand.

Vietnam started issuing biometric passports to citizens in March 2023.

== History ==
=== North Vietnam (1954–1975) ===
Passports were first issued in North Vietnam in 1959 when the first legislation regulating passport and went into effect. Under the legislation, the validity of passport was 3 years and can be extended, but for no more than 5 years since the original issuance date; and only those who were 18 and older were eligible for a passport.

In 1966, the North Vietnamese government passed a new law restricting the eligibility for passport. Effectively, the only people eligible for regular passport were those who traveled aboard "for official purposes", which includes:

- Specialists and experts
- Journalists working for Vietnamese News Agency
- Students studying overseas.

=== State of Vietnam (1947–1954) and South Vietnam (1954–1975) ===
A passport with the name "Vietnam" was first issued under the State of Vietnam, which had a red cover at the time. The Republic of Vietnam also issued its own passports.

== Application ==
Since 1 July 2022, there have been two methods of applying for a Vietnamese passport: fully online & hybrid (online & offline). Before that, the passport application in Vietnam was performed entirely offline; citizens came to the immigration office and submitted documents. Regardless of the method used, an application form is required for the issuance of a passport.

=== Forms ===
There are 2 types of passport application form:

Form	Eligibility
TK-01	For Vietnamese citizens applying for a passport inside Vietnam, and meet at least one of the following requirements: The applicant has never been issued a Vietnamese passport before; The applicant's most recent Vietnamese passport is expired, damaged or stolen; The applicant is over age 16; The applicant was under age 16 when upon the issuance of the applicant's previous passport
TK-02	For Vietnamese citizens applying for a passport outside of Vietnam.

== Fees ==
The Vietnamese passport is one of the cheapest in the world in terms of processing fees. As of 2022, the cost for a first-time passport or renewal (if applicant's most recent passport is undamaged and can be submitted with the application) is VND200,000; approximately US$8.64, and VND400,000; approximately US$17.27 if applicant's most recent passport is damaged or stolen. On 30 June 2025, the Ministry of Finance of Vietnam issued Circular No. 64/2025/TT-BTC effective from 1 July 2025 to 31 December 2026, regulating collection levels and exemptions of a number of fees and charges to support businesses and people to recover after the pandemic and promote socio-economic development. Accordingly, in the field of immigration, the following fees will be reduced by 50% compared to the collection rates prescribed in Section I of the Collection Rate Schedule issued with Circular No. 25/2021/TT-BTC. Thus, the fee for a new passport is only VNĐ100,000; approximately US$4.32 and the one for reissuing a passport due to damage or loss is VNĐ200,000; approximately US$8.64.

== Visa requirements ==
Visa requirements for Vietnamese citizens Vietnam Visa not required Visa not required (conditional) Visa on arrival eVisa Visa available both on arrival or online Visa required

As of 2026, Vietnamese citizens had visa-free or visa on arrival access to 49 countries and territories, ranking the Vietnamese passport 85th in the world according to the Henley Passport Index.

Vietnamese passport allows its bearer to stay up to 30 days visa-free, mostly in ASEAN countries. Otherwise, Vietnamese passport holders need to apply for a visa in advance to gain entry to most other developed nations.

== Passport design ==
=== Front cover ===
Vietnamese passports are purple-blue in colour, with the words "SOCIALIST REPUBLIC OF VIET NAM" and "CỘNG HÒA XÃ HỘI CHỦ NGHĨA VIỆT NAM" inscribed at the top of the front cover, and the emblem of Vietnam emblazoned in the centre of the front cover, whilst the words "HỘ CHIẾU" and "PASSPORT" are respectively inscribed below.

A current Vietnamese passport contains 48 pages and 2 purple blue cover pages. Text on the cover is described in Vietnamese and English, respectively, making the Vietnamese passport the only passport which does not use French within the former French Indochina states while Laotian and Cambodian passports both include French description on their covers.

=== Request page ===
On the back of the front cover, there is a note from Vietnamese Government addressed to the authorities of all other states:

This passport is the property of the Socialist Republic of Viet Nam and is issued to a Vietnamese citizen only.

This passport is valid for all countries unless otherwise endorsed.

The Government of the Socialist Republic of Viet Nam requests all competent authorities concerned to allow the bearer of this passport to pass freely and to afford him/her such assistance and protection as may be necessary.

=== Data page ===
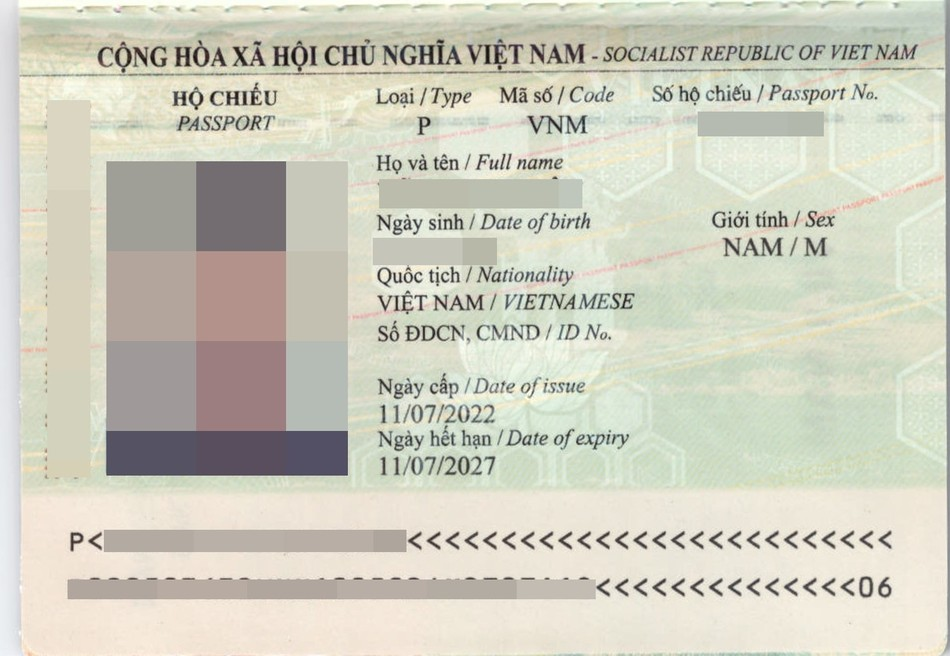
Data page of the 2022 Vietnamese passport design. This version notably lacks the birth-place section.

The second page provides data of the passport bearer (visual inspection zone) and a machine-readable zone:

- Type [of document, which is "P" for "personal", "D" for "diplomatic", "F" for "official"]
- Code [of the issuing country, which is "VNM" for "Vietnam"]
- Passport N° [Start with a letter, followed by 8 numbers]
- Surname
- Given Names
- Nationality (VIỆT NAM/VIETNAMESE)
- Date of birth
- Sex (M or F)
- Place of birth
- ID N°
- Date of issue
- Date of expiry
- Machine-readable zone

Prior to 1 July 2022, all Vietnamese passports had the "Place of birth" filed, which showed the province of birth of the holder (or the country of birth, if born overseas). The new passport design initially removed this field, which caused problem for immigration authorities, particularly in Europe (see below). The place of birth field was restored for passports issued since 1 January 2023.

=== Signature and authority page ===
The signature page (which is located on the third page) has a blank section for the signature of a passport holder. A passport is not valid until it is signed by the passport holder in black or blue ink. If a holder is unable to sign his passport, it is to be signed by a person who has legal authority to sign on the holder's behalf.

The issuing authority is also printed on this page. If a passport is issued inside Vietnam, the issuing authority will be Cục Quản lý Xuất nhập cảnh/ Vietnam Immigration Department. If a passport is issued outside of Vietnam the issuing authority will be Đại sứ quán Việt Nam tại (quốc gia)/ Embassy of Vietnam in (country's name)

=== Background illustrations ===
Starting with the new design, the motifs of the Đông Sơn drum are integrated into almost all inner pages as a foundational background pattern. Superimposed on this base layer are selected nature hotspots and famous sights of Vietnam, including:

- National Assembly Building of Vietnam (page 1)
- Temple of Literature (page 4–5)
- Lacquer painting "Bình Ngô Đại Cáo" (page 6–7)
- Lũng Cú Flag Tower (page 8–9)
- Fansipan summit marker (page 10)
- Sa Pa (page 11)
- Đồng Văn Stone Plateau (page 12–13)
- Hạ Long Bay (page 14–15)
- Hùng Temple (page 16–17)
- Imperial Citadel of Thăng Long (page 18–19)
- Đường Lâm Ancient Village (page 22–23)
- Tràng An (page 24–25)
- Citadel of the Hồ Dynasty (page 26–27)
- Imperial City of Huế (page 28–29)
- Hội An's Old Quarter (page 30–31)
- Mỹ Sơn Sanctuary (page 32–33)
- Tò Vò Gate – Lý Sơn Island (page 34–35)
- Dray Sap Waterfall (page 36–37)
- Dragon House (page 38–39)
- Bạch Hổ Oil Rig (page 40–41)
- Idyllic countryside motif with bamboo, kite flying, and a flute-playing buffalo rider (page 42–43)
- Rice paddies and bending rice stalks (page 44–45)
- Hanoi Opera House (page 46–47)

== Controversies ==
The new passport redesign from July 2022 removed the "Place of birth" field on the passport. While place of birth is not required in ICAO's passport standard, most countries include it in their passport (except South Korean passport, Swiss passport and Canadian passport - the latter only at request). As a result, some countries in the Schengen Area have refused to issue a visa and/or refuse admission to holder of new Vietnamese passport.

=== States' concerns and denials of admission ===
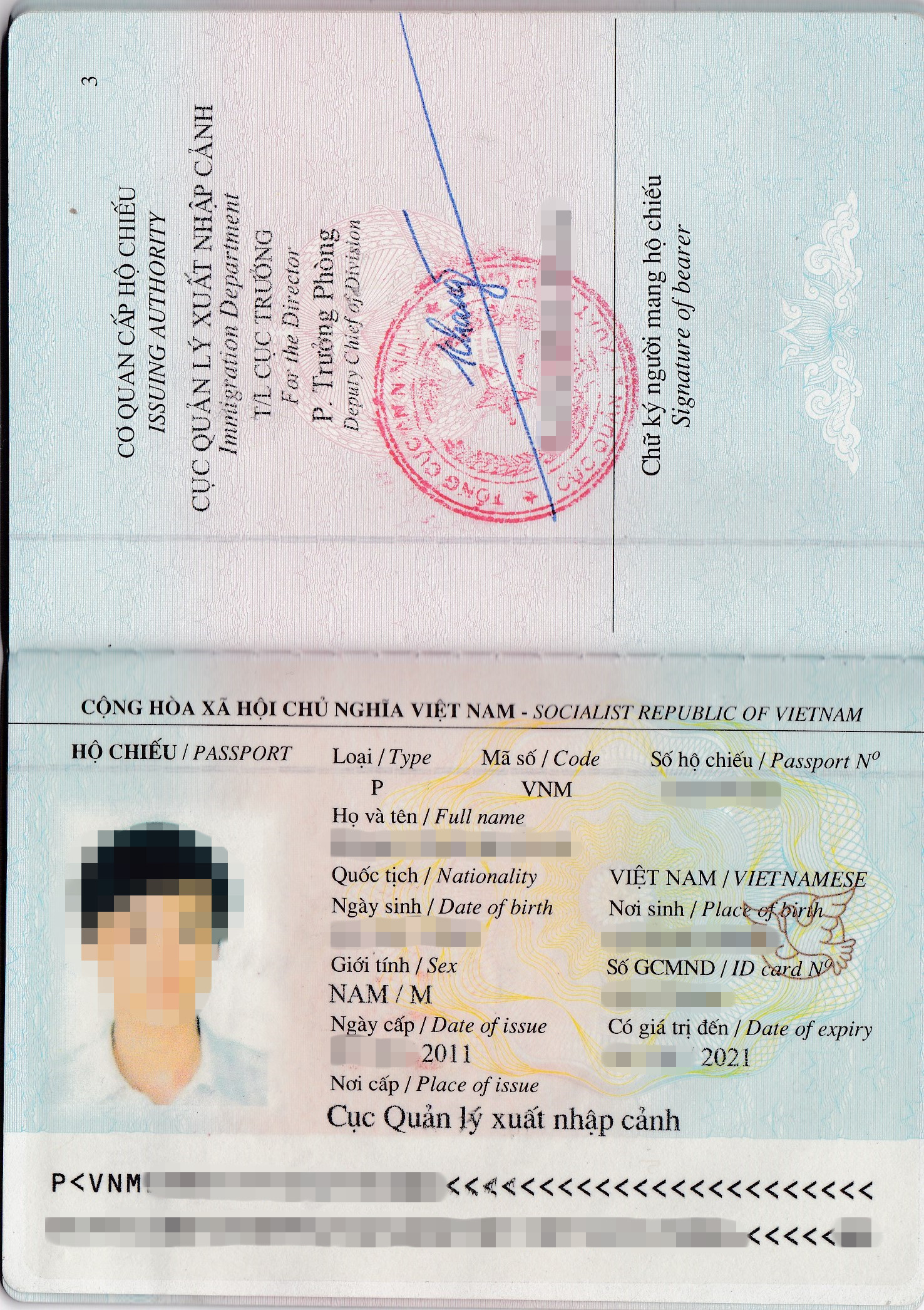
The information page of a Vietnamese passport issued in 2011. The new version of the passport lacks the place of birth field (which was located next to the date of birth field)

==== Germany ====
On 28 July 2022, the German embassy in Hanoi released a press release saying it cannot grant visa to holders of Vietnam's new passports as they lack information of one's place of birth, making it difficult for verification. Vietnam's new passports, which began issuance since 1 July, have not been recognized in Germany yet and their holders cannot apply for visa as the passports lack information regarding places of birth.

The press release further explained that: "German authorities cannot find information regarding places of birth based solely on a person's personal identification numbers as shown on their passports, it added. It means German authorities would need to verify one's identity manually with a 7-page list provided by the Vietnamese authorities, and not everyone has the list." As a result, holders of Vietnam's new passports, with dark blue cover instead of the traditional green ones, would not be able to apply for a C or D visa to enter Germany, and holders of the new passports who have already been granted a valid German visa could be denied entry at the border.

In response, the Vietnamese embassy in Germany will issue a certificate confirming the birthplace of holders of Vietnam's new passports. The embassy added that the two countries are "actively discussing" how to resolve the problems related to Germany's refusal to recognize the new Vietnamese passport on the grounds that it lacks information about the holder's place of birth.

==== Spain ====
On 1 August 2022, the Spanish embassy in Hanoi released an announcement saying that they could not issue new visas to holders of the new Vietnamese passport, due to the lack of place of birth. The announcement said in detail that: "Place of birth is an important information to identify passport holder, and is required for the issuance of a Schengen visa. Therefore, we cannot issue new visa to holder of new Vietnamese passport. As a result, Spanish authorities and authorities of other nations in Schengen bloc, are currently discussing ways to resolve this issue."

==== Czech Republic ====
In a statement released in the morning of 2 August 2022, which in part read: "Vietnam's new passport issued on July 1 does not meet the technical standards of the International Civil Aviation Organization (ICAO). Therefore, the Czech Republic agrees with other member countries of the European Union (EU) to stop recognizing it." The statement however did not specify whether the Czech Republic will stop issuing visas for the new Vietnamese passports.

==== Finland ====
On 11 August, the Embassy of Finland in Hanoi announced on its official website that the country will suspend the recognition of Vietnam's blue-violet passports. Accordingly, the embassy said that this new passport does not contain information about the passport holder's place of birth. This is required for personal identification and processing of Finnish visa/residence permit applications. Finland has decided to suspend the recognition of new model passports of Vietnam. The Embassy of Finland will not accept applications for a visa/residence permit from applicants presenting this new passport form until further notice from the Finnish authorities. The embassy will notify in case of any changes. Finland will actively work with EU member states, Schengen and the Vietnamese side to solve this problem.

==== Consideration of the United States ====
On 12 August, the US Embassy in Hanoi and the Consulate General of this country in Ho Chi Minh City said that US authorities are still in the process of reviewing Vietnam's blue-violet passport. However, the receipt of applications and visa approval is still taking place as usual. For new visa applications, the United States requires applicants to add their place of birth to their passport's observations before applying. For visa applications that have been received and scheduled for an interview, the United States notes that applicants need to bring an old model passport (with place of birth), birth certificate, ID card, or any other any documents that show the applicant's place of birth during the interview.

==== Acceptance of admission into France ====
The French Republic is the first country in the Schengen area to announce that they will continue to recognize the new passport of Vietnam (with a blue-purple color) and still issue visas as normal to applicants using this passport type. However, the French authorities note that Vietnamese citizens holding a new blue-violet model passport should pay attention to change their schedule, do not enter German territory even if they have been granted a Schengen visa by France, due to the denial of admission from Germany for this new Vietnamese passport.

==== Acceptance of admission into the United Kingdom ====
In the announcement of the UK Embassy and Consulate in Vietnam ("UK in Vietnam") on 3 August, the UK immigration authorities announced that they would continue to recognize the new passport model of Vietnam (issued from 1 July). However, the UK representative in Vietnam also noted that applicants need to monitor and update their stay schedule in the Schengen countries after the previous denial statements of some countries in this bloc.

=== Diplomatic efforts and re-recognition decisions ===
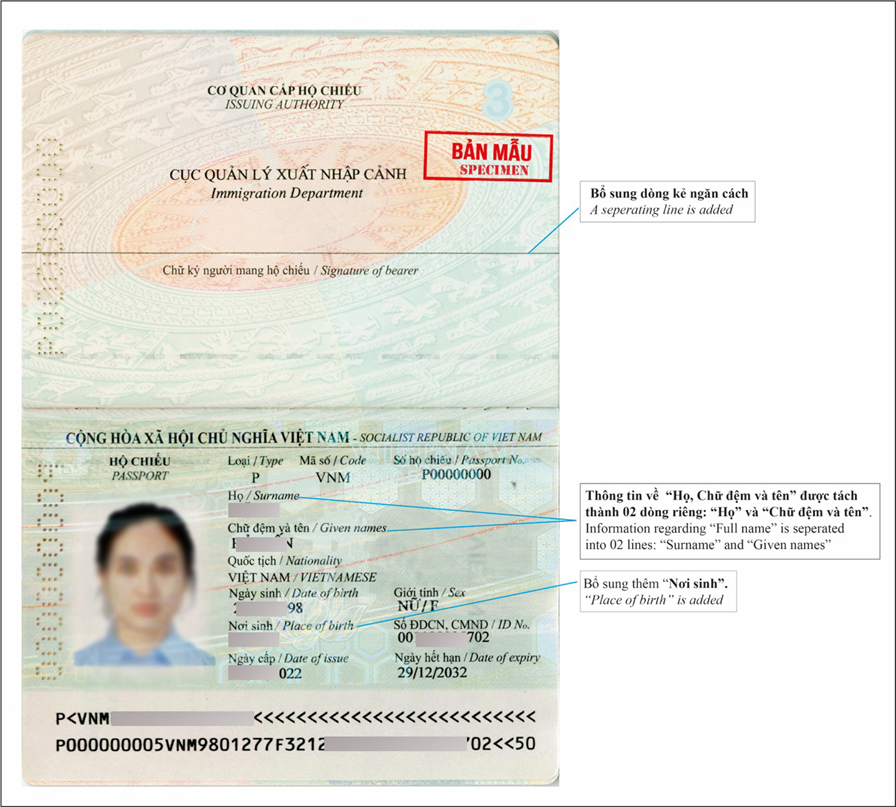
Changes applied to every standard Vietnamese passports issued from 2023 including the "formal return" of the "Place of birth" section.

In a negotiation effort of the Vietnamese government and German diplomatic missions, on 3 August, the representative of the Ministry of Public Security of Vietnam said that it would add birth information to the observations section of the new passport to serve for visa applications in countries that are temporarily not recognizing the new passport. Minister of Public Security - General To Lam said this is only a temporary measure. In the fourth quarter of 2022, the Ministry of Public Security will amend and add birthplace information to the new passport form, especially the chip-based passport model, which will be issued at the end of 2022.

After the negotiation period, the German authorities announced to temporarily recognize the new passport of Vietnam in case the citizen has been added the place of birth to the observations of the passport. The German Embassy in Hanoi said that for citizens using a new passport that has added the place of birth to their observations, visa issuance will be restarted immediately. However, the representative also noted that this is only a temporary measure, and only applies to short-term visas for business or visiting relatives (90 days), or long-term visas for international students. The long-term stay and work visa category C remains temporarily suspended until further notice.

On 8 August, after the review period, the Spanish Embassy in Vietnam said that the central authorities of this country have made an official decision on the re-recognition of Vietnam's blue-violet passports. Accordingly, the Spanish authorities confirmed that Vietnam's new purple-blue passport fully meets international standards and contains all necessary information. However, because the Schengen visa application and management agency still requires verification of the place of birth in the visa application, the Spanish Embassy requires the Vietnamese applicant to add a birth certificate or ID card in the visa application to enter this country.

== Gallery ==
=== Historic ===
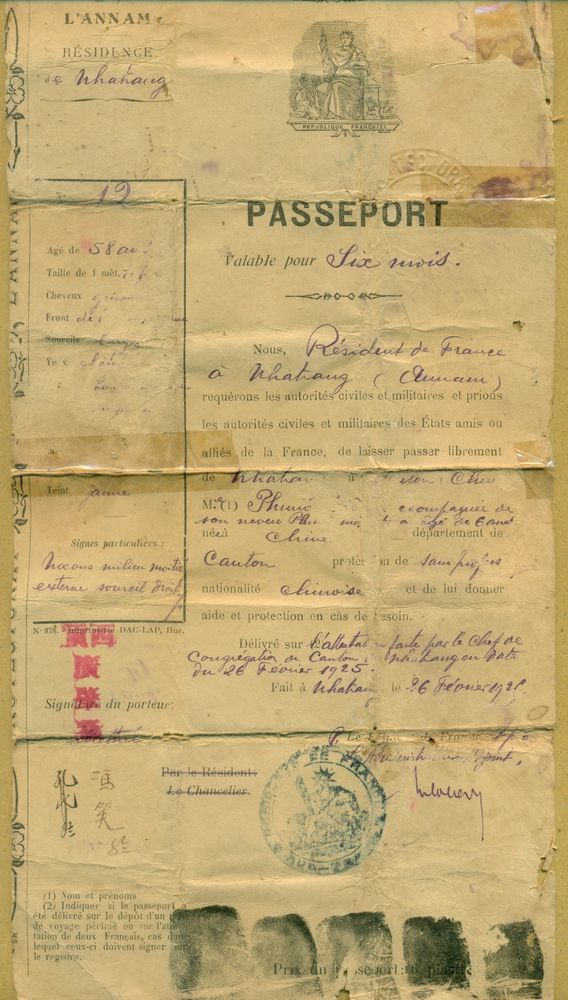
Passport issued by the Protectorate of Annam, French Indochina to a Chinese national (1925)

Passport of the Democratic Republic of Vietnam

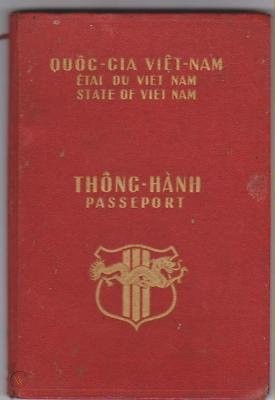
Passport design of the State of Vietnam

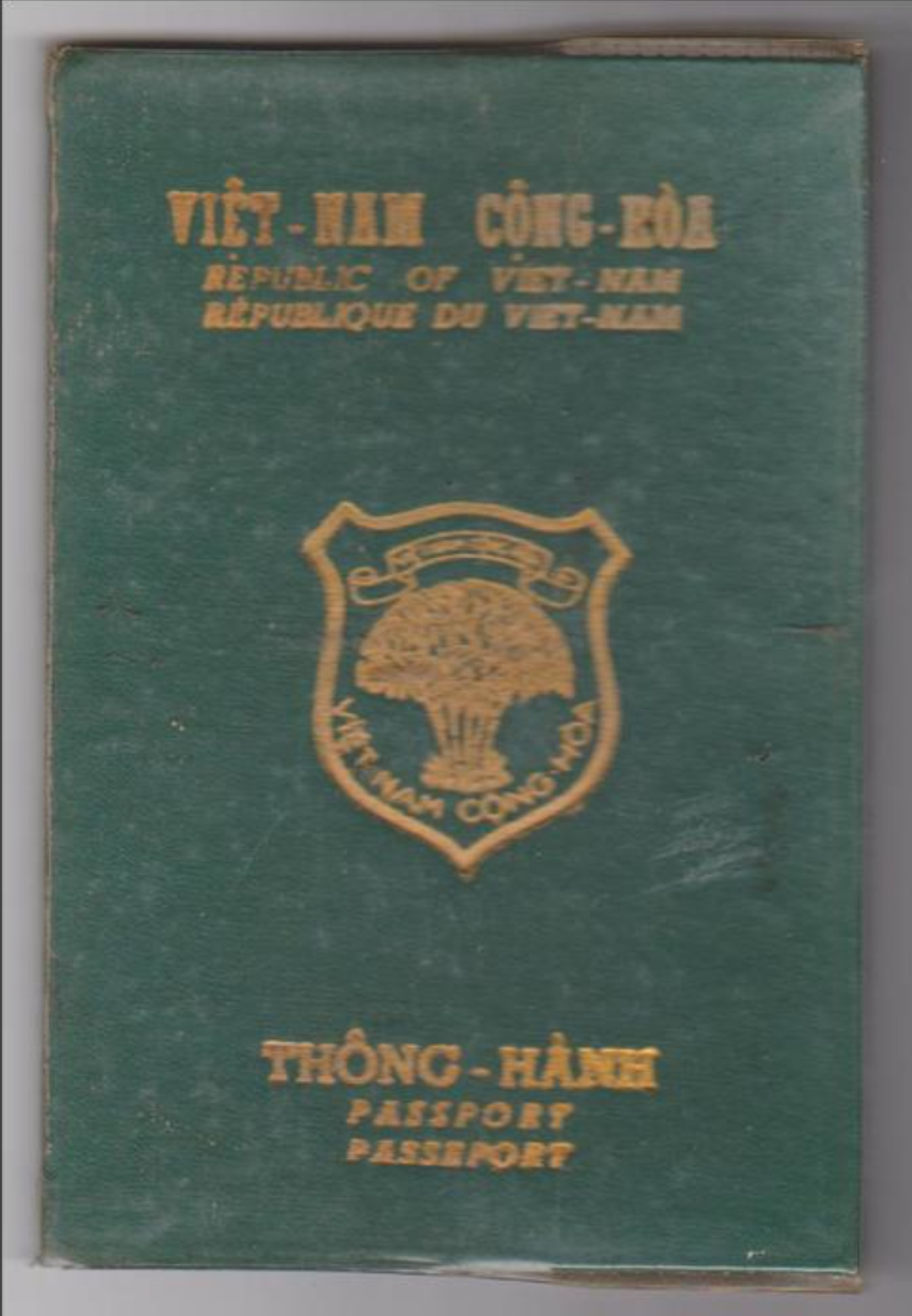
Passport design of the Republic of Vietnam

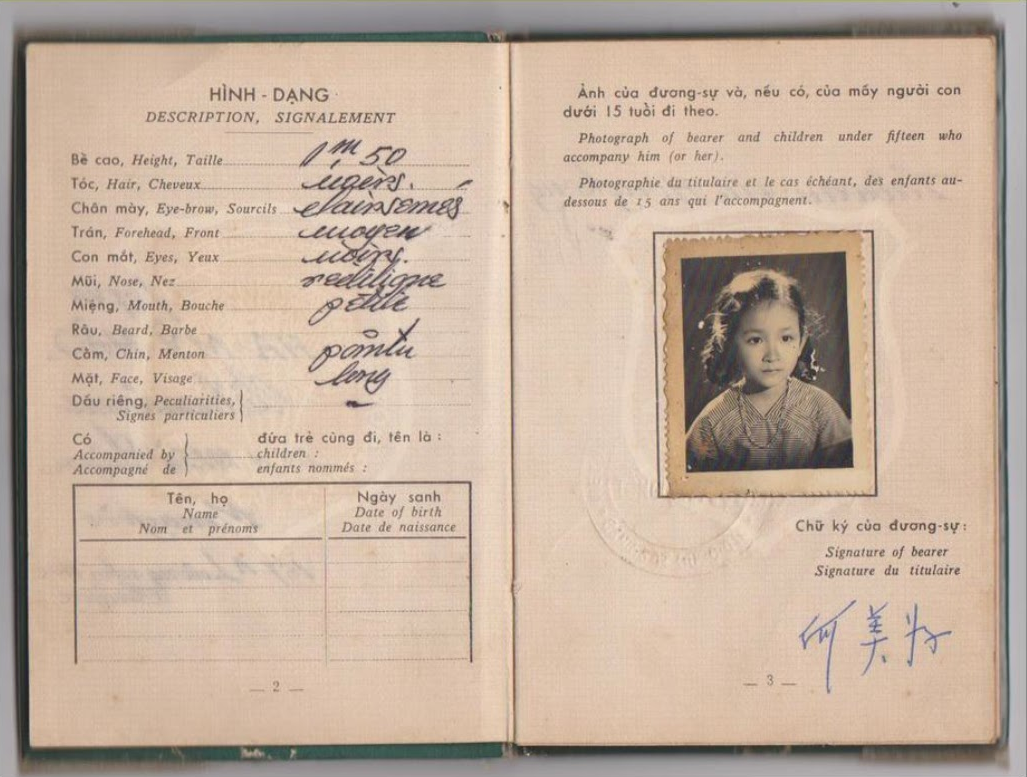
South Vietnamese bearer's information page.

Passport of Vietnam (issued in 1994)

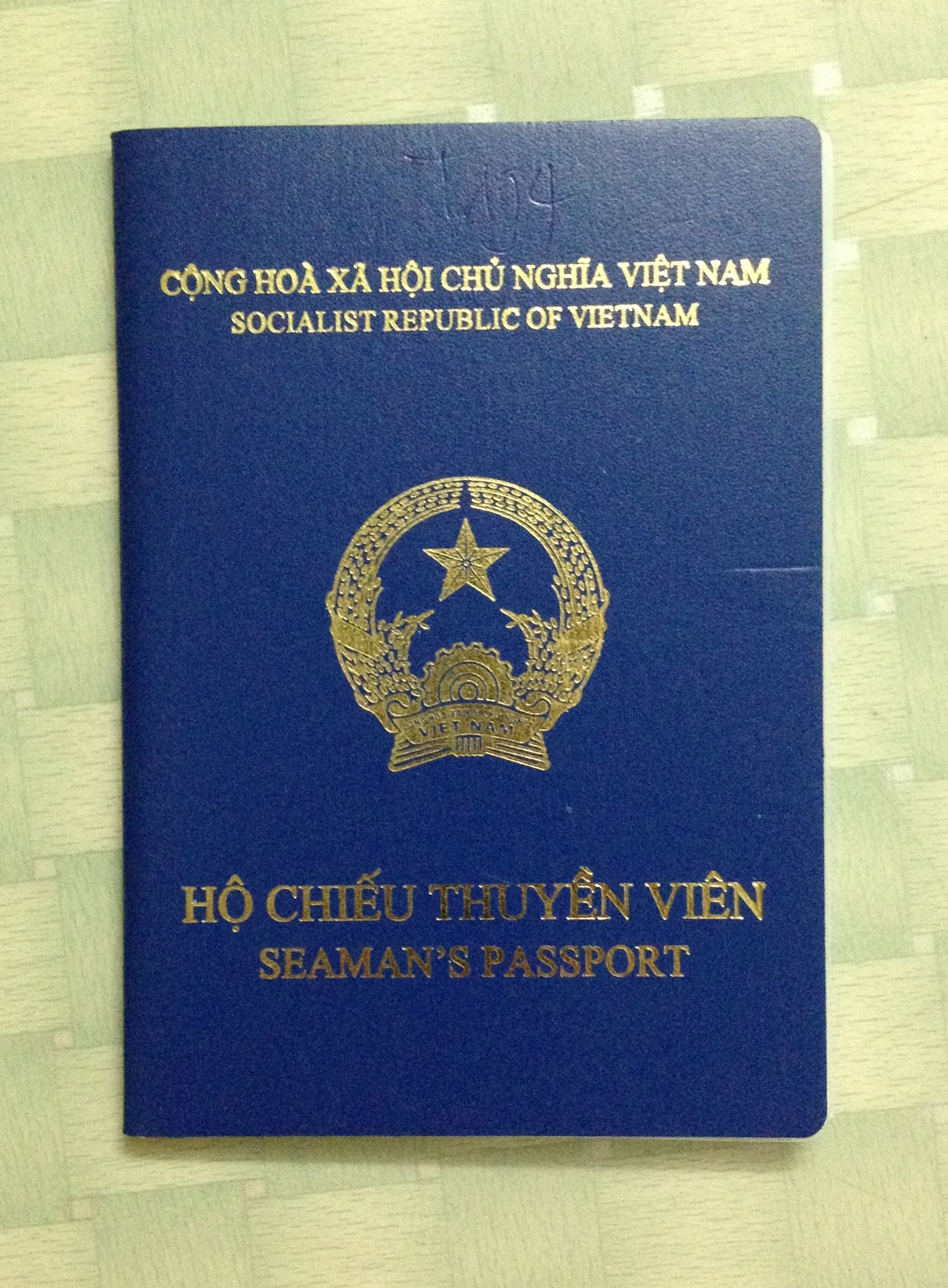
Vietnamese seaman's passport (stopped issuing from July 1, 2017)

=== Contemporary ===
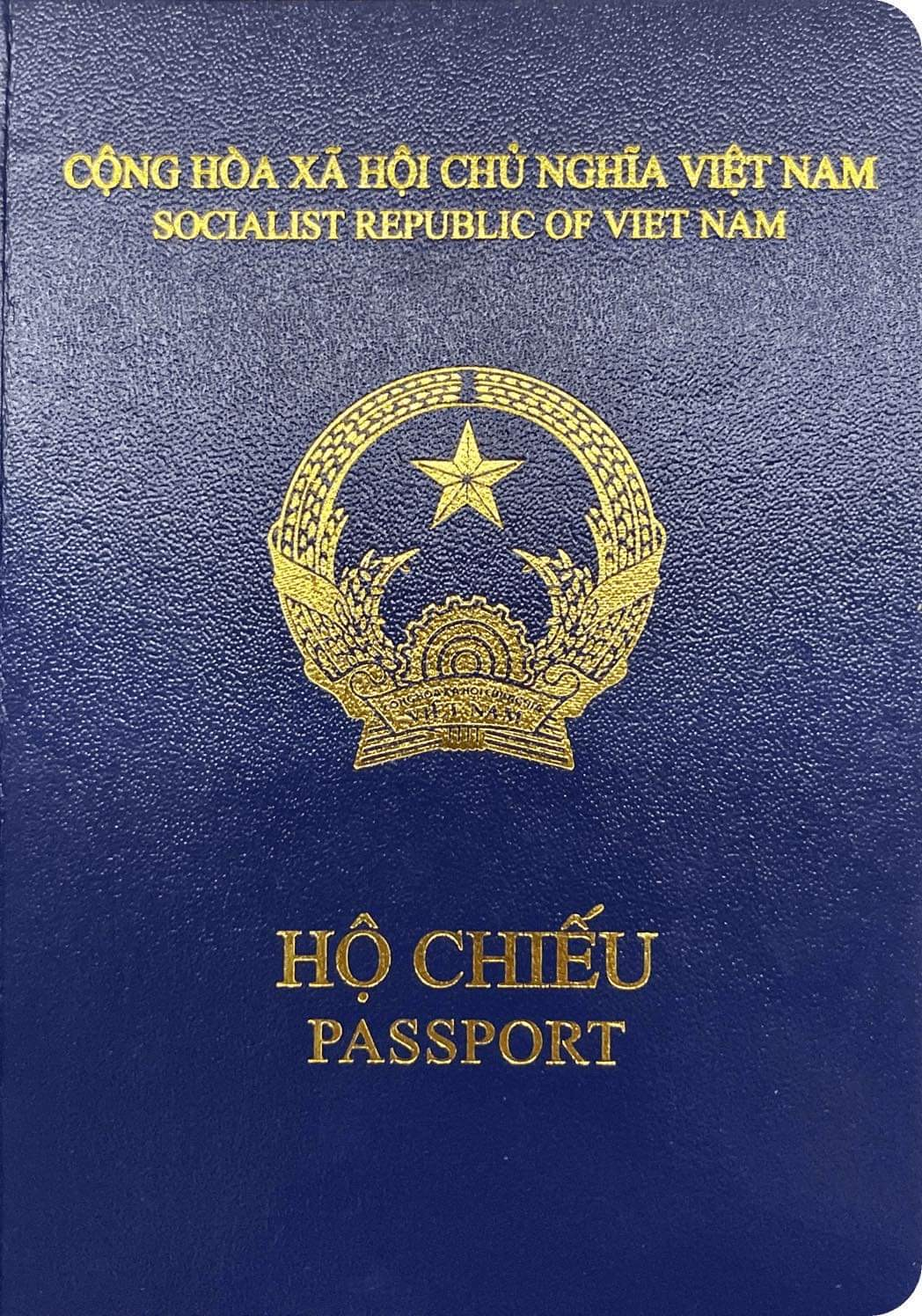
Version of the current Vietnamese passport without the biometric symbol

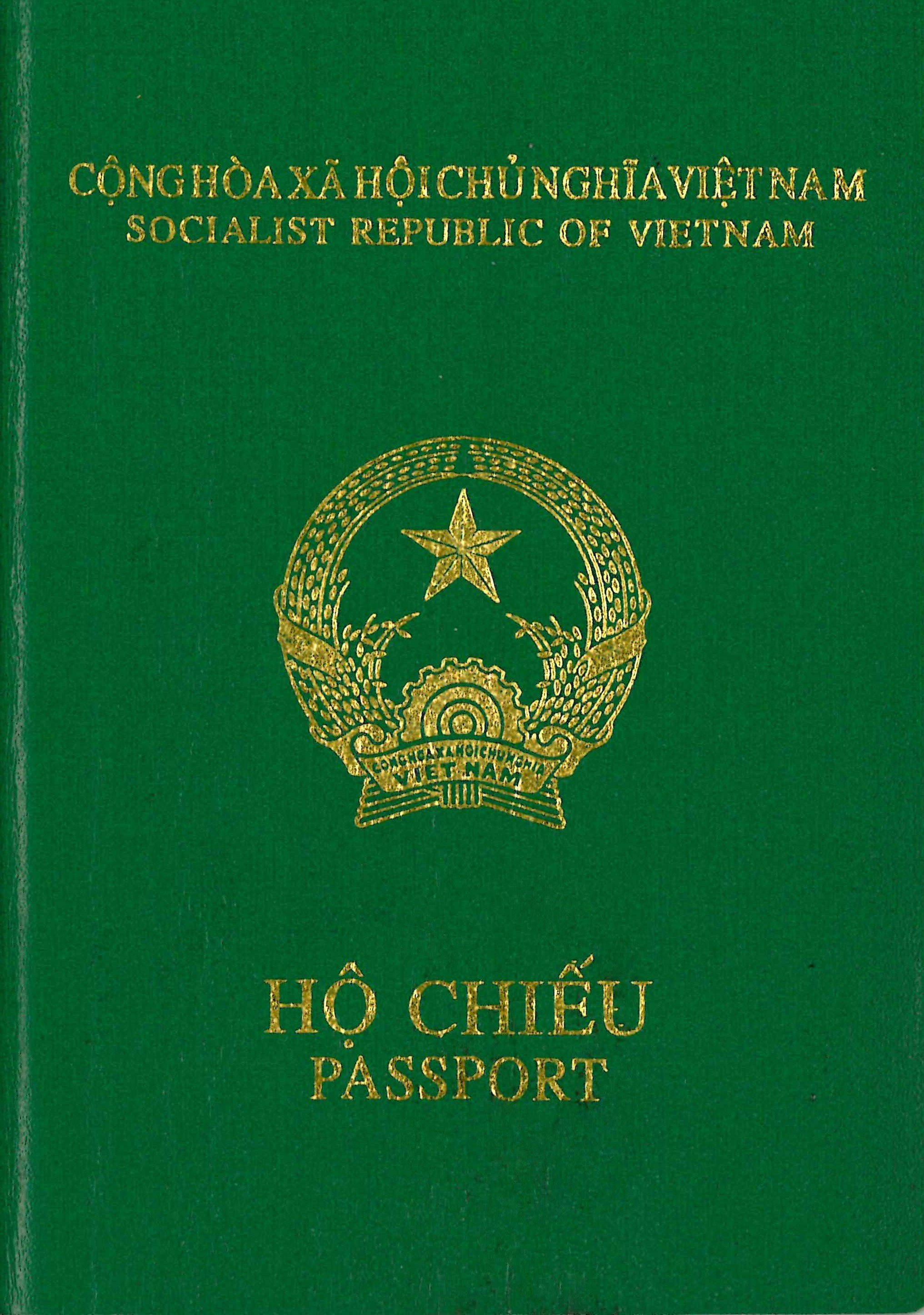
Vietnamese passport with green cover issued before July 1, 2022

Passport issued under simplified procedure, black cover page (HCPT-RG model)

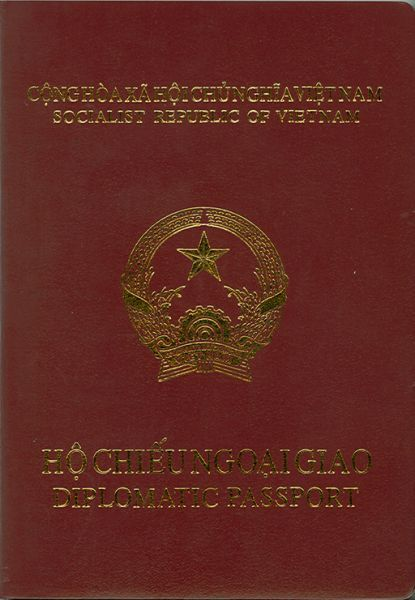
Diplomatic passport

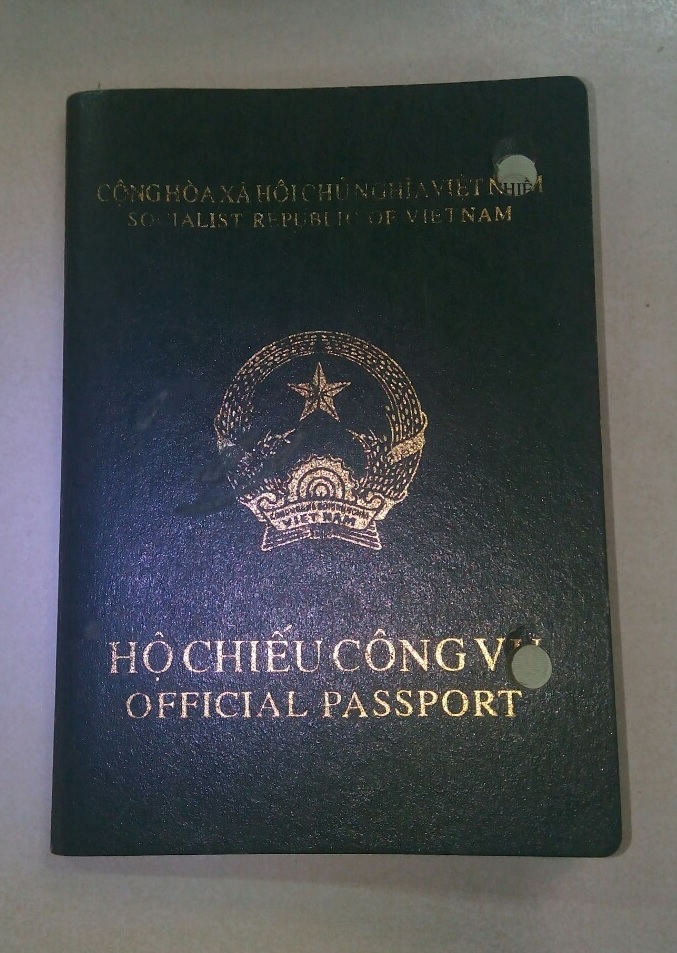
Official passport (expired and perforated).

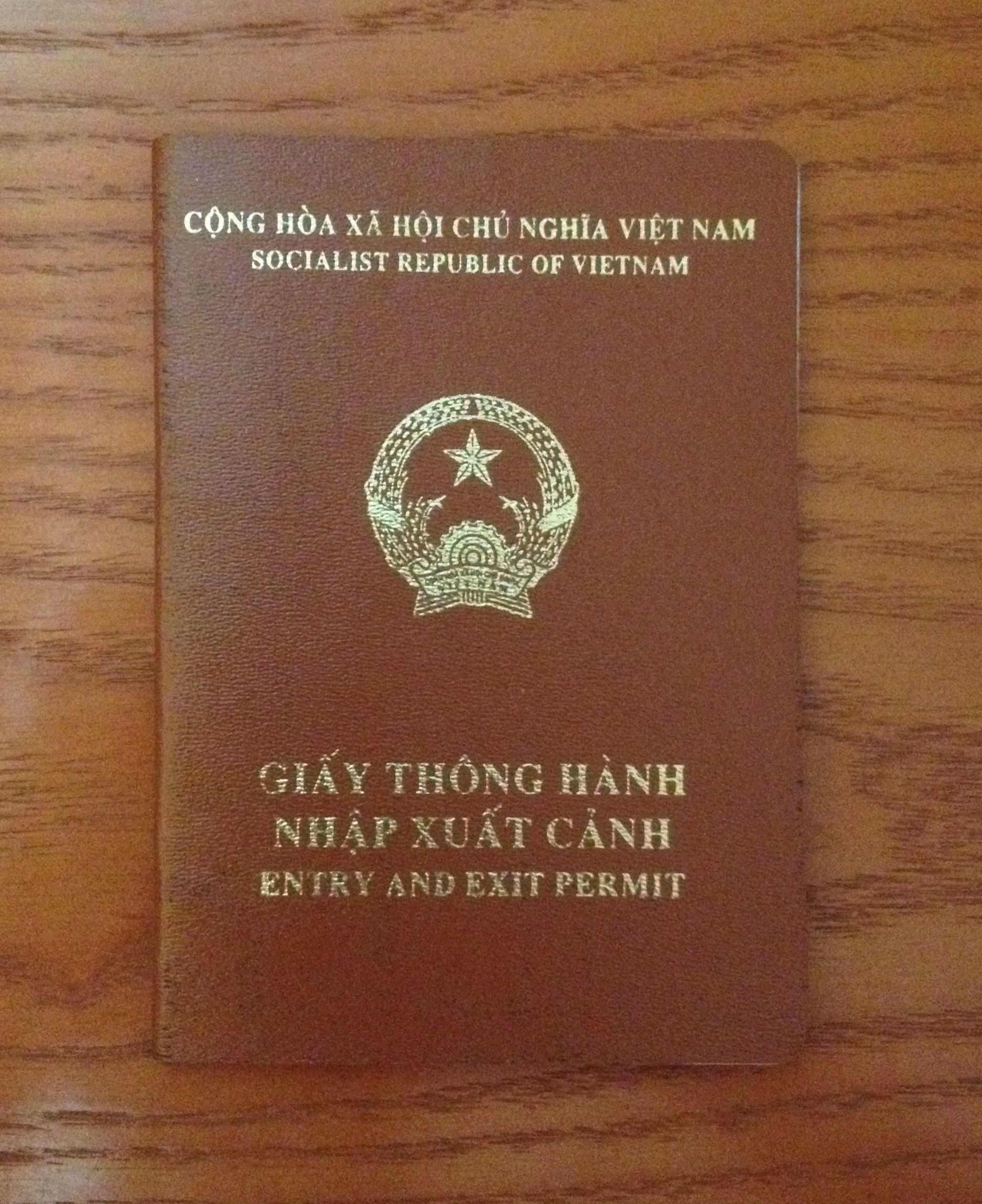
An entry and exit permit (Giấy thông hành nhập xuất cảnh) for people who lost their passport or as alternative permit to cross land borders with neighboring countries.

An exit and entry permit of the Vietnam - China border area issued to border residents (GTHVN02-TQ model)

== See also ==
- Vietnamese identity card
- Visa requirements for Vietnamese citizens
- Visa policy of Vietnam
