= Visa requirements for Vietnamese citizens =

Administrative entry restrictions

Visa requirements for Vietnamese citizens are administrative entry restrictions imposed on citizens of Vietnam by the authorities of other states.

As of 2026, Vietnamese citizens had visa-free or visa on arrival access to 49 countries and territories, ranking the Vietnamese passport 84th in the world according to the Henley Passport Index.

== Visa requirements map ==
Visa requirements for Vietnamese citizens holding ordinary passports Vietnam Visa not required Visa not required (conditional) Visa obtainable on arrival eVisa Visa available both on arrival or online Visa required

== Visa requirements ==
Country	Visa requirement	Allowed stay	Notes (excluding departure fees)
Afghanistan	eVisa	30 days	Visa is not required in case born in Afghanistan or can proof that one of their parents is a national of Afghanistan or born in Afghanistan.; e-Visa : Visitors must arrive at Kabul International Airport (KBL).
Albania	eVisa	90 days	Visa-free for Schengen, US, UK multiple-entry visa or residence permit holders, which has been previously used in the respective country of issuance.
Algeria	Visa required		Visitors on tours organized to some southern regions by an approved travel agency may obtain a visa on arrival for up to 30 days.
Andorra	Visa required		There are no visa requirements for entry into Andorra, but it can only be accessed by passing through France or Spain. A multiple entry visa is required to re-enter either France or Spain when leaving Andorra.; All visitors can stay for 3 months.
Angola	eVisa	30 days	
Antigua and Barbuda	eVisa		Holders of a visa or residency issued by Canada, USA, United Kingdom or a Schengen Member State can obtain a visa upon arrival that costs USD100 for a maximum of 30 days.
Argentina	Visa required		The AVE (High Speed Travel) is open to Vietnamese citizens holding valid, current ordinary passports traveling to Argentina for tourism. To do so, they must hold a valid category B2/J/B1/O/P (P1-P2-P3)/E/H-1B visa issued by the United States of America.
Armenia	eVisa	120 days	
Australia	Online visa required		May apply online (Online Visitor e600 visa).
Austria	Visa required		
Azerbaijan	eVisa	30 days	Travellers with Artsakh visa (expired or valid) or evidence of travel to Artsakh (stamps) will be permanently denied entry to Azerbaijan.
Bahamas	eVisa		
Bahrain	eVisa / Visa on arrival	14 days	
Bangladesh	Visa required		
Barbados	Visa not required	90 days	
Belarus	Visa not required	30 days	30 days per visit, maximum 90 days within a year
Belgium	Visa required		
Belize	Visa required		Visa-free for holders of valid visa for Schengen area up to 90 days or holders of multiple-entry US visa for up to 30 days.
Benin	eVisa	30 days	Must have an international vaccination certificate.; Three types of electronic visa are offered: the e-Visa valid for 30 days for a single entry (50 EUR), the e-Visa valid for 30 days for several (multiple) entries (75 EUR), and the e-Visa valid for 90 days to make several (multiple) entries (100 EUR).
Bhutan	eVisa	90 days	The Sustainable Development Fee (SDF) of 200 USD per person, per night for almost all visitors to Bhutan. Additionally, if payment is made in US dollars from September 1, 2023 to August 31, 2027, the SDF is 100 USD.
Bolivia	Online Visa	30 days	
Bosnia and Herzegovina	Visa required		Visa free for holders of valid visa for Schengen area.
Botswana	eVisa	3 months	
Brazil	Visa required		
Brunei	Visa not required	14 days	
Bulgaria	Visa required		Visa free for holders of valid visa for Schengen area.
Burkina Faso	eVisa		
Burundi	Online Visa / Visa on arrival	1 month	
Cambodia	Visa not required	30 days	
Cameroon	eVisa		
Canada	Visa required		
Cape Verde	Visa required		
Central African Republic	Visa required		
Chad	eVisa		
Chile	Visa not required	90 days	
China	Visa required		Visa not required for 'Public affairs' passport.; 240-hour (10-day) visa-free transit to a third country or territory, if enter and exit from any of the 65 designated ports. Domestic travel permitted.; 24-hour visa-free transit through any international airports of China, allows domestic travel through different airports. (Note: Custom procedure for 24-hour visa-free transit is required in principle, except in Beijing (both Capital and Daxing), Shanghai Pudong, Hangzhou, Xiamen, Guangzhou, Shenzhen, Chengdu Tianfu and Xi'an if no leaving of international transit areas.); Visa-free access for 30 days to Hainan Island.
Colombia	Online visa		Visa free for holders of valid visa for Schengen area or the US.
Comoros	Visa on arrival	45 days	
Republic of the Congo	Visa required		
Democratic Republic of the Congo	eVisa	7 days	
Costa Rica	Visa required		Visa-free for holders of valid visa for Schengen area or the US.
Côte d'Ivoire	eVisa	3 months	e-Visa holders must arrive via Port Bouet Airport.
Croatia	Visa required		
Cuba	eVisa	90 days	Can be extended up to 90 days with a fee.
Cyprus	Visa required		Visa-free for holders of valid visa for Schengen area.
Czech Republic	Visa required		
Denmark	Visa required		
Djibouti	eVisa	90 days	
Dominica	Visa not required	21 days	
Dominican Republic	Visa required		
Ecuador	Visa required		
Egypt	Visa on arrival	30 days	
El Salvador	Visa required		
Equatorial Guinea	eVisa		
Eritrea	Visa required		
Estonia	Visa required		
Eswatini	Visa required		
Ethiopia	eVisa	90 days	e-Visa holders must arrive via Addis Ababa Bole International Airport
Fiji	Online Visa		
Finland	Visa required		
France	Visa required		
Gabon	eVisa	90 days	e-Visa holders must arrive via Libreville International Airport.
Gambia	Visa required		An entry clearance must be obtained from the Gambian Immigration prior to travel.
Georgia	eVisa	30 days	
Germany	Visa required		
Ghana	Visa required		
Greece	Visa required		
Grenada	Visa required		
Guatemala	Visa required		
Guinea	eVisa	90 days	
Guinea-Bissau	Visa on arrival	90 days	
Guyana	eVisa		
Haiti	Visa required		
Honduras	Visa required		
Hungary	Visa required		
Iceland	Visa required		
India	eVisa	30 days	e-Visa holders must arrive via 32 designated airports (Note: Ahmedabad; Amritsar; Bagdogra; Bengaluru; Bhubaneswar; Chandigarh; Chennai; Coimbatore; Delhi; Gaya; Goa-Dabolim; Goa-Manohar; Guwahati; Hyderabad; Indore; Jaipur; Kannur; Kochi; Kolkata; Kozhikode; Lucknow; Madurai; Mangaluru; Mumbai; Nagpur; Port Blair; Pune; Surat; Thiruvananthapuram; Tiruchirappalli; Varanasi; Visakhapatnam) or 5 designated seaports. (Note: Chennai; Cochin; Mormugao; Mumbai; Mangalore); An Indian e-Tourist Visa may only be obtained twice within 1 calendar year.; Foreigners of Pakistani origin or who hold a Pakistani Passport are not eligible for an e-Visa. Foreigners who are not Pakistani nationals, but whose parents or grandparents (either paternal or maternal) were born in, or were permanent residents in Pakistan, are also not eligible for an e-Visa.
Indonesia	Visa not required	30 days	
Iran	Visa not required	15 days	
Iraq	eVisa	30 days	
Ireland	Visa required		Visa-free for short stay UK visa holders, who have entered the UK on foot. They may use the time remaining on their current leave to enter Ireland.
Israel	Visa required		
Italy	Visa required		
Jamaica	Visa required		
Japan	Visa required		
Jordan	eVisa / Visa on arrival	30 days	Visa can be obtained upon arrival, at a fee of 40 JOD.; The visa is obtainable at most international ports of entry and land border crossings, except Allenby Bridge.
Kazakhstan	Visa not required	30 days	30 calendar days from the date of entry, for a total of 90 calendar days every 6 months.
Kenya	Electronic Travel Authorisation	90 days	Applications can be submitted up to 90 days prior to travel and must be submitted at least 3 days in advance.; eTA fee is 32.50 USD.; Proof of reservation at the hotel where visitors plan to stay is required (if staying with friends, an invitation letter is also acceptable).; Yellow fever vaccination certificate is required if coming from endemic countries.
Kiribati	Visa required		
North Korea	Visa required		
South Korea	Visa required		Visa free transit (up to 30 days) provided holding a valid U.S., Canada, Australia, New Zealand visa, and arriving from or departing to those countries.; Visa-free access for 30 days to Jeju Island.; Group tourists can only travel to the Gangwon-do region and the metropolitan area of South Korea, and the maximum stay is 15 days.
Kuwait	Visa required		
Kyrgyzstan	Visa not required	30 days	Visa-free regime to be in force on 6 August 2021.
Laos	Visa not required	30 days	
Latvia	Visa required		
Lebanon	Visa required		In addition to a visa, an approval should be obtained from the Immigration department of the General Directorate of General Security (La Surete Generale).
Lesotho	Visa required		
Liberia	e-VOA	3 months	
Libya	eVisa		
Liechtenstein	Visa required		
Lithuania	Visa required		
Luxembourg	Visa required		
Madagascar	Visa on arrival	90 days	For stays of 61 to 90 days, the visa fee is 59 USD.
Malawi	eVisa / Visa on arrival	30 days	Can extend for a total of 90 days.
Malaysia	Visa not required	30 days	
Maldives	Free visa on arrival	30 days	Can be extended.
Mali	Visa required		
Malta	Visa required		
Marshall Islands	Visa on arrival	90 days	
Mauritania	eVisa	30 days	Available at Nouakchott–Oumtounsy International Airport.
Mauritius	Visa on arrival	60 days	
Mexico	Visa required		Visa-free for holders of valid US, Schengen, Japanese, Canadian, or UK visas. Visa-free also for holders of US, Japanese, Canadian, UK, Schengen, Peru, Chilean, or Colombian residence permits.
Micronesia	Visa not required	30 days	
Moldova	Visa required		Citizens holding a residence permit or a valid visa issued by one of the member states of the European Union or one of the parties to the Schengen Agreement can apply for an e-Visa.
Monaco	Visa required		
Mongolia	Visa not required	30 days	
Montenegro	Visa required		Visa free for holders of valid visa for Schengen area.
Morocco	eVisa	90 days	Vietnamese holding ordinary passports may apply for an e-Visa without further document requirements.
Mozambique	eVisa / Visa on arrival	30 days	
Myanmar	Visa not required	30 days	
Namibia	eVisa / Visa on arrival	90 days / 3 months	
Nauru	Visa required		
Nepal	Online Visa / Visa on arrival	90 days	
Netherlands	Visa required		
New Zealand	Visa required		Holders of an Australian Permanent Resident Visa or Resident Return Visa may be granted a New Zealand Resident Visa on arrival permitting indefinite stay (pursuant to the Trans-Tasman Travel Arrangement), subject to meeting character requirements and obtaining an Electronic Travel Authority prior to departure.
Nicaragua	Visa required		
Niger	Visa required		
Nigeria	eVisa	30 days	
North Macedonia	Visa required		Visa-free for Schengen multiple-entry visa or residence permit holders, 15 days upon every entry into the territory of the Republic of North Macedonia as long as the total length of stay does not exceed 90 days in any 180-day period.
Norway	Visa required		
Oman	Visa required		Visa not required for a 14-day visit if the visitor holds a valid visa from the United States, Canada, Australia, the United Kingdom, Schengen Agreement countries, or Japan.
Pakistan	eVisa	3 months	
Palau	Free visa on arrival	30 days	Can be extended twice only with a fee.
Panama	Visa not required	90 days	
Papua New Guinea	eVisa	30 days	
Paraguay	Visa on arrival	30 days	
Peru	Visa required		
Philippines	Visa not required	30 days	
Poland	Visa required		
Portugal	Visa required		
Qatar	eVisa		
Romania	Visa required		Visa free for holders of valid visa for Schengen area.
Russia	Visa not required	30 days	For a maximum total stay of 90 days within one calendar year period; Visa not required from 15 October 2026 to 15 October 2027
Rwanda	Visa not required	30 days	
Saint Kitts and Nevis	eVisa	30 days	
Saint Lucia	Visa on arrival	6 weeks	
Saint Vincent and the Grenadines	Visa not required	3 months	
Samoa	Entry permit on arrival	90 days	
San Marino	Visa required		
São Tomé and Príncipe	eVisa		
Saudi Arabia	Visa required		
Senegal	Visa required		
Serbia	eVisa	90 days	90 days within any 180-day period. Transfers allowed.; Visa-free for a maximum stay of 90 days for valid visa holders or residents of the European Union member states and the United States.
Seychelles	Electronic Border System	3 months	Application can be submitted up to 30 days before travel.; Visitors must upload a reservation confirmation(s) for each visitor's location of stay in Seychelles.; Yellow fever vaccination certificate is required if coming from endemic countries.; Payment of the fee (EUR 10) by credit or debit card.; Valid for one journey only and it expires once exit the country.
Sierra Leone	eVisa / Visa on arrival	3 months / 30 days	
Singapore	Visa not required	30 days	
Slovakia	Visa required		
Slovenia	Visa required		
Solomon Islands	Visa required		Pre-arranged visa can be picked up on arrival.
Somalia	eVisa	30 days	All visitors must have an approved Electronic Visa (eTAS) before the start of their journey.
South Africa	Electronic Travel Authorisation	90 days	
South Sudan	eVisa		Obtainable online.; Printed visa authorization must be presented at the time of travel.
Spain	Visa required		
Sri Lanka	ETA / Visa on arrival	30 days	
Sudan	Visa required		
Suriname	Visa not required	90 days	An entrance fee of USD 50 or EUR 50 must be paid online prior to arrival.; Multiple entry e-Visa is also available.
Sweden	Visa required		
Switzerland	Visa required		
Syria	eVisa		
Tajikistan	Visa not required (conditional) / Visa on arrival/ eVisa	14 days / 45 days / 60 days	Visa not required for citizens over the age of 55 and they can stay for up to 14 days.; e-Visa holders can enter through all border points.
Tanzania	eVisa / Visa on arrival	90 days	
Thailand	Visa not required	60 days	
Timor-Leste	Visa not required	30 days	
Togo	eVisa	15 days	
Tonga	Visa required		
Trinidad and Tobago	eVisa	90 days	
Tunisia	Visa required		
Turkey	eVisa	30 days	30 days per 180-day period.
Turkmenistan	Visa required		When transiting between two non-bordering countries, visitors can obtain a Turkmenistan transit visa for a five-day stay. This must be applied for in advance at the Turkmenistan Embassy. Visitors must also submit copies of the visas for the country of entry into Turkmenistan and the country of departure from Turkmenistan. Visa fee is 20 USD.
Tuvalu	Visa on arrival	1 month	
Uganda	eVisa	3 months	
Ukraine	Visa required		
United Arab Emirates	Visa required		May apply using 'Smart service'.
United Kingdom	Visa required		Direct Airside Transit visa (DATV) and Visitor in Transit visa (TWOV) may not be required under certain conditions.
United States	Visa required		
Uruguay	Visa required		
Uzbekistan	Visa not required (conditional) / eVisa	30 days	Visa not required for citizens over the age of 55 and they can stay for up to 30 days.; 5-day visa-free transit at the international airports if holding a confirmed onward ticket for a flight to a third country.
Vanuatu	Visa required		
Vatican City	Visa required		
Venezuela	eVisa		
Yemen	Visa required		Yemen introduced an e-Visa system for visitors who meet certain eligibility requirements (group travel of 10 or more people, business trips, and transit etc.).
Zambia	eVisa / Visa on arrival	90 days	
Zimbabwe	eVisa	1 month	

=== Territories, disputed areas and restriction zone ===
Visitor to	Visa requirement	Allowed stay	Notes (excluding departure fees)
Africa
Eritrea outside Asmara	Travel permit required		To travel in the rest of the country, a Travel permit for Foreigners is required (20 Nakfa).
Ascension Island	Admission Refused		From May 2015, Ascension Island government no longer issues entry visas for nationals of Vietnam.
Saint Helena	eVisa	183 days	Visitor are issued an entry permit valid for 183 days.
Tristan da Cunha	Permission required		Permission to land required for £15/30 (yacht/ship passenger) for Tristan da Cunha Island or £20 for Gough Island, Inaccessible Island or Nightingale Island.
Mayotte	Visa required		
Réunion	Visa required		
Sahrawi Arab Democratic Republic	Undefined		Undefined visa regime in the Western Sahara controlled territory.
Somaliland	Visa required		Visa on arrival can be obtained if you have letter of invitation from the government.
Sudan outside Khartoum	Travel permit required		All Foreigners traveling more than 25 kilometers outside of Khartoum must obtain a travel permit.
(Sudan) Darfur	Travel permit required		Separate permit required.
Asia
British Indian Ocean Territory	Special permit required		Special permit required.
Hong Kong	eVisa		
(China) Shenzhen	Visa on arrival	5 days	SEZ visa
(China) Zhuhai and Xiamen	Visa on arrival	3 days	SEZ visa
India PAP/RAP	PAP/RAP		Protect Area Permit (PAP) required for whole states of Nagaland and Sikkim and parts of states Manipur, Arunachal Pradesh, Uttarakhand, Jammu and Kashmir, Rajasthan, Himachal.; Restricted Area Permit (RAP) required for all of Andaman and Nicobar Islands and parts of Sikkim.; Some of these requirements are occasionally lifted for a year.
(Kurdistan Region) Iraqi Kurdistan	Visa required		If the guarantor applies and pays, the visitors may apply for an e-Visa. e-Visa for 30 days is available at Erbil and Sulaymaniyah airports.
Kazakhstan	Special permission required		Special permission required for the town of Baikonur and surrounding areas in Kyzylorda Oblast, and the town of Gvardeyskiy & Priozersk near Almaty.
(Iran) Kish Island and Qeshm Island	Visa not required	14 days	All tourists, may stay on Kish Island and Qeshm Island for 14 days or less without obtaining any visa.
Macau	Visa required		Visitors must obtain a visa in advance through the Chinese diplomatic mission.
Maldives outside Malé	Permission required		Tourists are generally prohibited from visiting non-respect islande without the express permission of the Government of Maldives.
(Saudi Arabia) Mecca and Medina	Special access required		Non-Muslims and those following the Ahmadiyya religious movement are strictly prohibited from entry.
(India) North Sentinel Island	Restricted zone		
North Korea outside Pyongyang	Special permit required		People are not allowed to leave the capital city; tourists can only leave the capital with a governmental tourist guide (no independent travel allowed)
Palestine	Visa not required		Arrival by sea to Gaza Strip is not allowed.
Taiwan	Visa required		Holders of valid or expired-within-10-year visa/ electronic visa, residence permit, or permanent resident issued by US, Canada, UK, Australia, New Zealand, and Schengen Member States are eligible to fill out an ETA form in order to be allowed for 14 days visa-free access
(Tajikistan) Gorno-Badakhshan Autonomous Province	OIVR permit required		OIVR permit required (20 TJS) and another special permit (free of charge) is required for Lake Sarez.
(China) Tibet Autonomous Region	TTP required		Tibet Travel Permit required (10 USD).
Closed cities of Turkmenistan	Special permit required		A special permit, issued prior to arrival by Ministry of Foreign Affairs, is required if visiting the following places: Atamurat, Cheleken, Dashoguz, Serakhs and Serhetabat.
(United Nations) Korean Demilitarized Zone	Restricted area		
(United Nations) UNDOF Zone and Ghajar	Restricted area		
Yemen outside Sanaa or Aden.	Special permission required		Special permission needed for travel outside Sanaa or Aden.
Europe
Abkhazia	Visa required		Tourists from all countries (except Georgia) can visit Abkhazia for a period not exceeding 24 hours as part of an organized tourist group.
Mount Athos	Special permit required		Special permit required (4 days: €25 for Orthodox visitors, €35 for non-Orthodox visitors, €18 for students). There is a visitors' quota: maximum 100 Orthodox and 10 non-Orthodox per day and women are not allowed.
(Belarus) Brest and Grodno	Visa not required	10 days	Belarus has a visa-free regime of all foreign visitors going to the Brest recreation zone including Belovezhskaya Pushcha National Park for a period of up to 10 days.
Northern Cyprus	Visa not required	90 days	Citizens of all countries may enter without a visa for up to 90 days except the citizens of Armenia, Nigeria and Syria.
(United Nations) UN Buffer Zone in Cyprus	Access Permit required		Access Permit is required for traveling inside the zone, except Civil Use Areas.
Faroe Islands	Visa required		If you don't normally need a visa for Denmark, you can visit the Faroe Islands visa-free under the same rules (90 days in a half year).; If you need a visa for Denmark, inform the embassy when you apply that you'll be visiting the Faroe Islands, as Schengen-area visas issued for the mainland don't apply to the Faroe Islands (or Greenland).
Gibraltar	Visa required		Visa-free if you hold a diplomatic passport.
Guernsey	Visa required		Visa policy of United Kingdom are applies de facto.
Isle of Man	Visa required		Visa policy of United Kingdom are applies de facto.
(Norway) Jan Mayen	Permit required		Permit issued by the local police required for staying for less than 24 hours.; Permit issued by the Norwegian Police for staying for more than 24 hours.
Jersey	Visa required		Visa policy of United Kingdom are applies de facto.
Kosovo	Visa required		
Closed cities of Russia	Special authorization required		Several closed cities and regions in Russia require special authorization.
South Ossetia	Visa required		To enter South Ossetia, visitors must have a multiple-entry visa for Russia and register their stay with the Migration Service of the Ministry of Internal Affairs within 3 days.
Svalbard	Visa not required	Unlimited	The Svalbard Treaty grants treaty nationals equal right of abode as Norwegian nationals.; Non-treaty nationals may live and work indefinitely visa-free as well.
Transnistria	Visa not required		Registration required after 24h.
Caribbean and North Atlantic
Anguilla	eVisa		In addition, holders of a valid visa or residence permit from the United States, Canada or the United Kingdom and holders of diplomatic passport don't require a visa.
Aruba	Visa required		
Bermuda	Visa required		
(Netherlands) (Bonaire, St. Eustatius and Saba)	Visa required		
British Virgin Islands	Visa required		Permanent residents of the United States, Canada or the United Kingdom don't require a visa.
Cayman Islands	Visa required		Visa required for transit.
(Colombia) San Andrés and Leticia	Tourist Cards on arrival		Visitors over the age of 6 arriving at San Andrés and Leticia must purchase tourist cards on arrival at a cost of COP$105,000 and COP$30,000.
Curaçao	Visa required		
(France) French West Indies	Visa required		French West Indies refers to Martinique, Guadeloupe, Saint Martin and Saint Barthélemy
Greenland	Visa required		
(Venezuela) Margarita Island	Visa required		
Montserrat	eVisa		Multiple-entry e-Visa valid for 1 year can be obtained through the internet, prior to departure.
Saint Pierre and Miquelon	Visa required		
Sint Maarten	Visa required		
Turks and Caicos Islands	Visa required		Permanent residence or holders of valid Visas of the United States, Canada or the United Kingdom don't require a visa for a maximum stay of 90 days.
Oceania
American Samoa	Visa required		
(Australia) Ashmore and Cartier Islands	Special authorisation permit		
(Australia) Christmas Islands	Visa required		Passports and Visas aren't required when travelling from the Australian mainland. However, photographic identification must be produced for clearance through customs and Immigration. Normal Australian customs and Immigration procedures apply when entry is made from outside Australia.
Cocos (Keeling) Islands	Visa required		Passports and Visas aren't required when travelling from the Australian mainland. However, photographic identification must be produced for clearance through customs and Immigration. Normal Australian customs and Immigration procedures apply when entry is made from outside Australia.
(Australia) Macquarie Island	Special authorisation permit		A written authorisation of the Director of National Parks and Wildlife is required.
Norfolk Island	Visa required		From 1 July 2016 all movement between Norfolk Island and Australian mainland are considered as domestic movement, however all passenger are still required to carry passports or, for Australian citizens, some type of photographic identification and pass Customs and Immigration. Normal Australian Customs and Immigration procedures apply when entry is made from outside Australia. Passenger not carrying their passports aren't eligible to purchase duty-free goods on Norfolk Island.
Clipperton Island	Visa required		
Cook Islands	Visa not required	31 days	
New Caledonia	Visa required		
(Fiji) Lau Province	Special Permission required		
French Polynesia	Visa required		
Guam	Visa required		
Niue	Visa not required	30 days or less	
Northern Mariana Islands	Visa required		
Pitcairn Islands	Visa not required	14 days or less	
Tokelau	entry permit required		All visitors must obtain a permit to enter Tokelau from the Tokelau Apia Liaison Office in Apia, at least 2 weeks prior to travel. Tokelau can only be reached by boat from Samoa and a permit from the Samoan Immigration Authorities is required to leave and re-enter Samoa.
United States Minor Outlying Islands	Special permits required		Special permits required for Baker Island, Howland Island, Jarvis Island, Johnston Atoll, Kingman Reef, Midway Atoll, Palmyra Atoll and Wake Island.
Wallis and Futuna	Visa required		
South America
Galápagos	Pre-registration required		60 days; Visitors must pre-register to receive a 20 USD Transit Control Card (TCT).
French Guiana	Visa required		
South Atlantic and Antarctica
Falkland Islands	Visa required		
South Georgia and the South Sandwich Islands	Permit required		Pre-arrival permit from the Commissioner required (72 hours/1 mouth for £110/160).
Antarctica	Special permits required		Special permits required for Bouvet Island, British Antarctic Territory, French Southern and Antarctic Lands, Argentine Antarctica, Australian Antarctic Territory, Chilean Antarctic Territory, Heard Island and McDonald Islands, Peter I Island, Queen Maud Land, Ross Dependency.

== APEC Business Travel Card ==
Full members of the scheme Transitional members (United States, Canada)

Holders of an APEC Business Travel Card (ABTC) travelling on business do not require a visa to the following countries:

- Australia^{2}
- Brunei^{2}
- Chile^{2}
- China^{4}
- Hong Kong^{4}
- Indonesia^{4}
- Japan^{2}
- Malaysia^{2}
- Mexico^{1}
- New Zealand^{2}
- Papua New Guinea^{4}
- Peru^{2}
- Philippines^{4}
- Russia^{3}
- Singapore^{4}
- South Korea^{2}
- Taiwan^{2}
- Thailand^{2}

_{1 - Up to 180 days}
_{2 - Up to 90 days}
_{3 - Up to 90 days in a period of 180 days}
_{4 - Up to 60 days}

The card must be used in conjunction with a passport and has the following advantages:

- No need to apply for a visa or entry permit to APEC countries, as the card is treated as such (except by Canada and United States)
- Undertake legitimate business in participating economies
- Expedited border crossing in all member economies, including transitional members

== See also ==
- Visa policy of Vietnam
- Vietnamese passport
