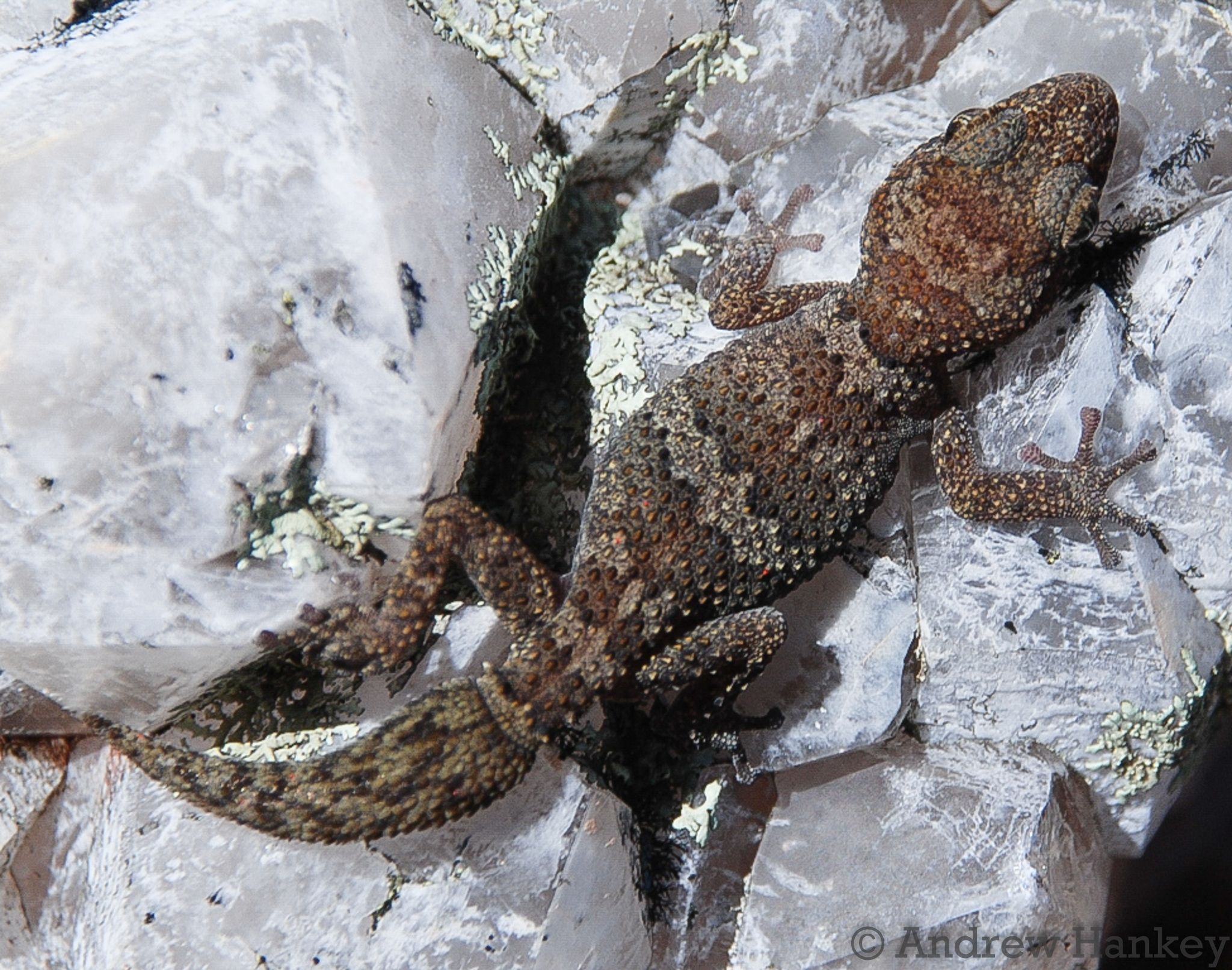

Conservation status
- Near Threatened (IUCN 3.1)

Scientific classification
- Kingdom: Animalia
- Phylum: Chordata
- Class: Reptilia
- Order: Squamata
- Suborder: Gekkota
- Family: Gekkonidae
- Genus: Paroedura
- Species: P. ibityensis

Binomial name
- Paroedura ibityensis Rösler & Krüger, 1998
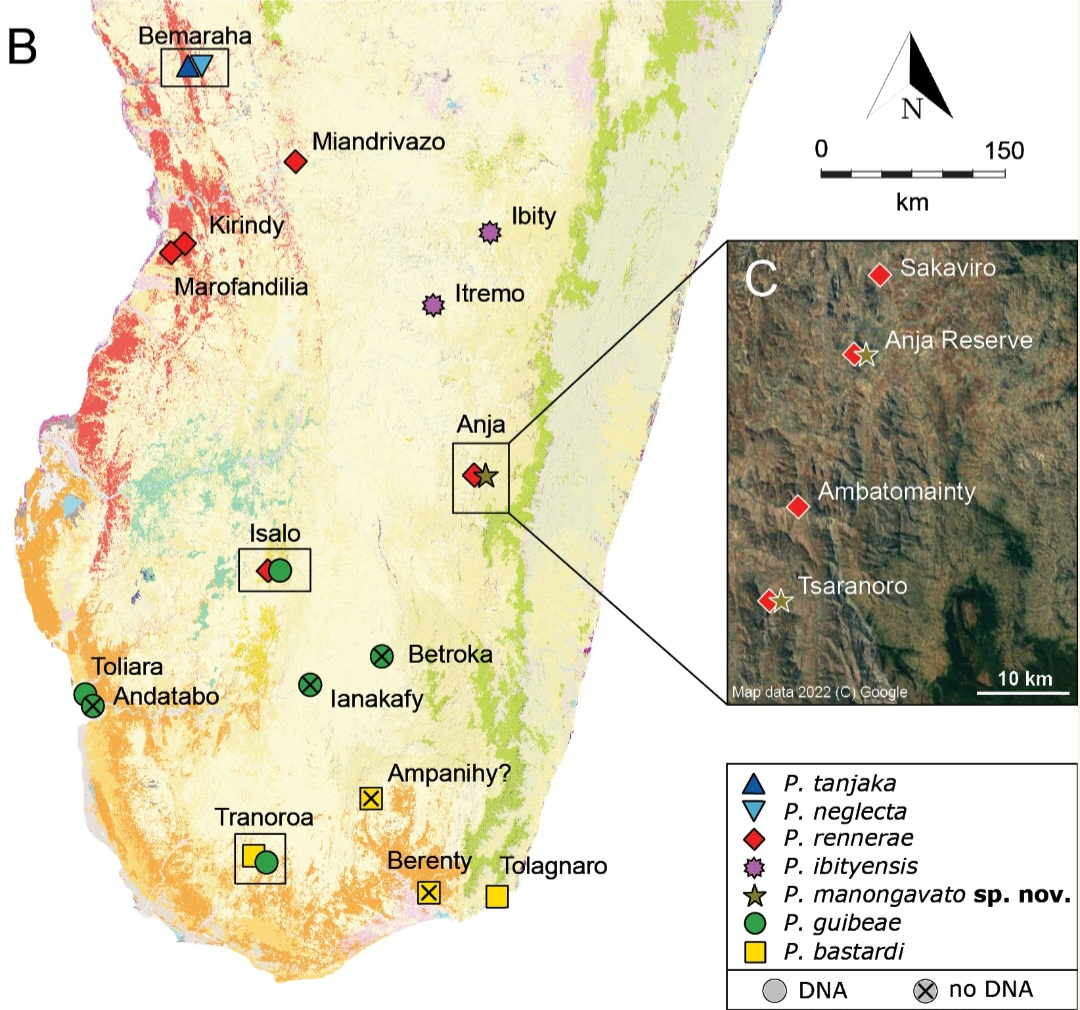
- Range of the species within the Paroedura bastardi clade, with P. ibityensis indicated by the purple decagrams

Synonyms
- Paroedura bastardi ibityensis (Rösler & Krüger, 1998)

= Ibity ground gecko =

Species of lizard

The Ibity ground gecko (Paroedura ibityensis) is a species of lizard in the family Gekkonidae. Though initially described in 1998 as a subspecies of the Mocquard's Madagascar ground gecko, it has been recognized as a distinct species within the species complex since 2008. It is endemic to Ibity and Itremo in the Central Highlands of Madagascar, and is named after Mount Ibity where it was first discovered.

This species reaches a snout–vent length of just over 6 cm and has enlarged keeled scales. While not currently deemed an endangered species, it has a limited and specialized habitat which could be easily impacted the climate change in the future.

== Taxonomy ==
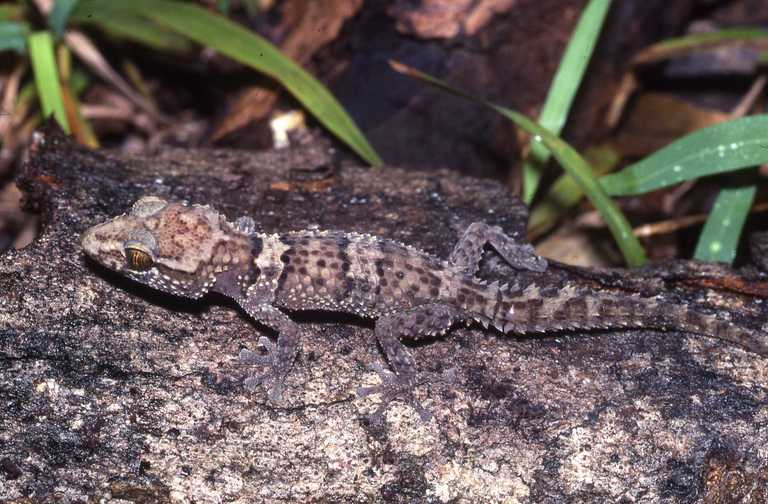
Mocquard's Madagascar ground gecko, a closely related species which the Ibity ground gecko was formerly thought to be conspecific with

The Ibity ground gecko was first described in 1998 by Rösler & Krüger under the scientific name Paroedura bastardi ibityensis, with the authors believing it to be a subspecies of the Mocquard's Madagascar ground gecko (Paroedura bastardi). However, later studies would find that it differs both morphologically and genetically from the nominate form of Paroedura bastardi, and it has been recognized as a separate species since 2008, now known as Paroedura ibityensis. The specific name refers to Mount Ibity, the type locality.

The following cladogram shows the position of P. ibityensis among its closest relatives according to Piccoli et al. (2023):

- - Paroedura picta (Outgroup)
  - - Paroedura bastardi
    - - - Paroedura guibeae
        - Paroedura manongavato
      - - Paroedura rennerae
        - - Paroedura ibityensis
          - - Paroedura neglecta
            - Paroedura tanjaka

== Distribution and habitat ==
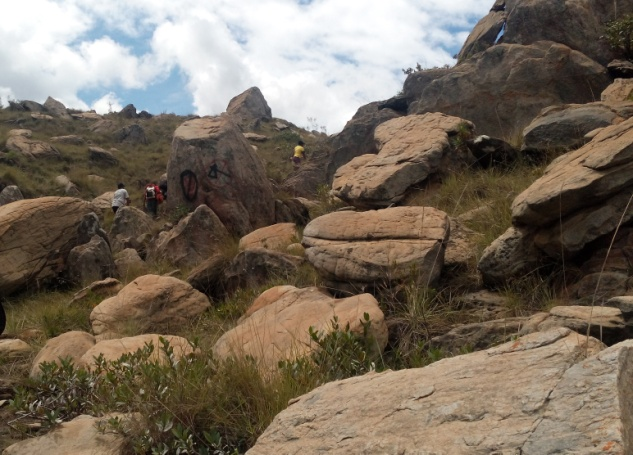
Rock outcrops in Ibity

The Ibity ground gecko is endemic to the Central Highlands of Madagascar, and is only known from the localities of Ibity and Itremo. It has been observed from 1,600 m above sea level, and may range to over 2,000 m to the tops of the massifs. This montane species inhabits rocky crevices in highland savannahs, such as those in cliffs or mountain peaks. While other species of the Paroedura bastardi species complex are known to coexist with each other, the Ibity ground gecko is not known to occur in sympatry with its relatives in this highland habitat.

== Description ==
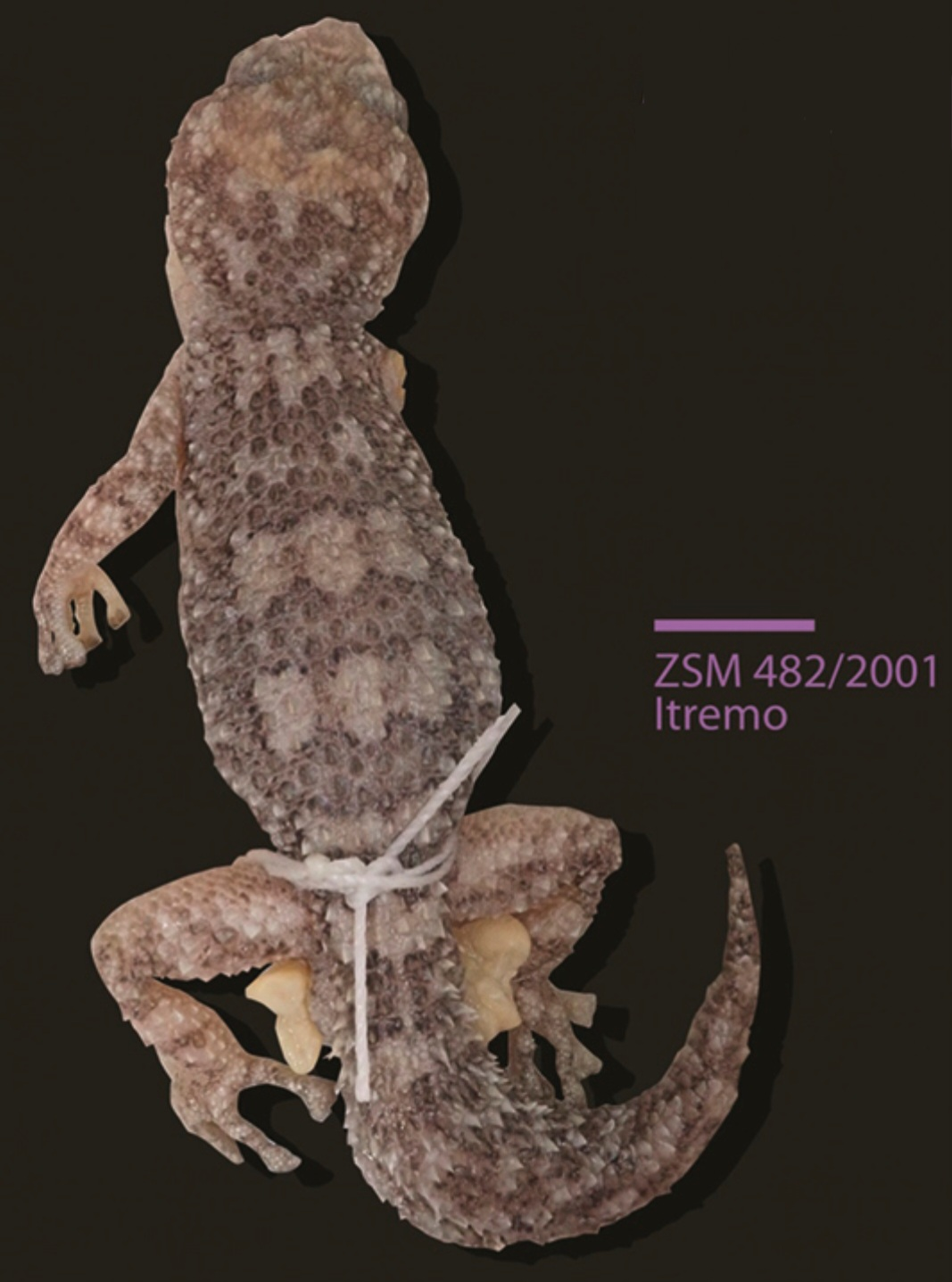
Specimen collected from Itremo

This species is a moderately-sized gecko, with a maximum snout–vent length of 61 mm. Like other members of the Paroedura bastardi clade, the Ibity ground gecko has prominent longitudinal rows of enlarged keeled scales on its dorsal surface, including on the limbs and tail. The digits end with widened toe pads which help the animal in climbing low tree trunks and rock surfaces. The body is grey or light brown, with light crossbands that are most prominent in juveniles.

== Conservation ==
Although the Ibity ground gecko remains common in rocky outcrops within its range and its population is presumed stable, the species has been listed as Near Threatened by the IUCN due to its narrow extent of occurrence, being known from only two localities. Mining for granite may pose a potential threat, though plans to do so within the range of this reptile do not currently exist. Future impacts from climate change may alter the specialized montane habitat of this lizard, with the warming climate causing upslope displacement of the population.

Though the species itself has not been the subject of conservative measures, both its known localities (Ibity and Itremo) are protected areas subject to conservation. Ecological restoration projects and ongoing efforts to reduce fire frequency have been involved in the initiative to protect these areas.
