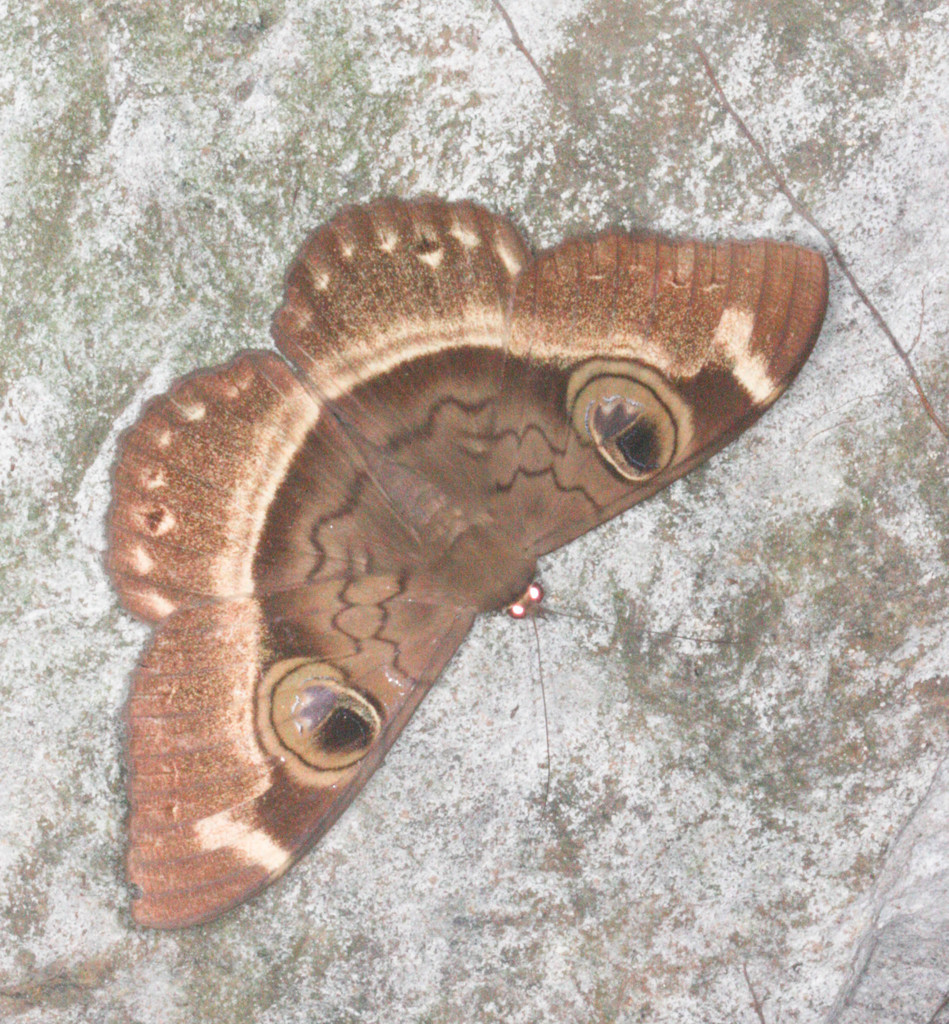

Scientific classification
- Kingdom: Animalia
- Phylum: Arthropoda
- Class: Insecta
- Order: Lepidoptera
- Superfamily: Noctuoidea
- Family: Noctuidae (?)
- Genus: Cyligramma
- Species: C. duplex

Binomial name
- Cyligramma duplex Guenée, 1852

= Cyligramma duplex =

Species of moth

Cyligramma duplex is a moth of the family Noctuidae. It is found in Madagascar. It is a nocturnal insect known to rest in caves during the day, where it may be preyed upon by the gecko Paroedura tanjaka. Many dead individuals can reportedly be found covered with white fungus.
