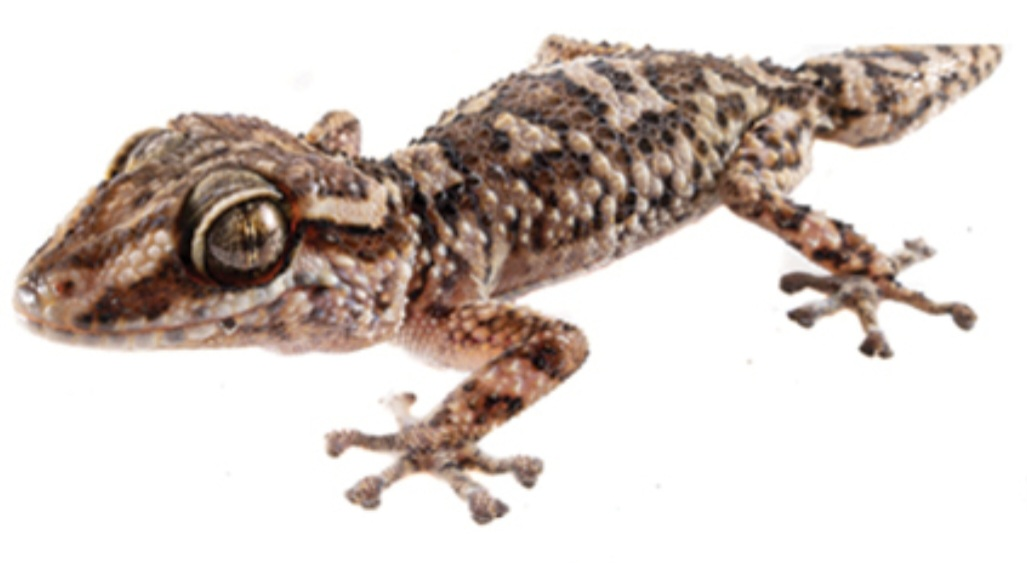
- Male from Ambatomainty

Scientific classification
- Kingdom: Animalia
- Phylum: Chordata
- Class: Reptilia
- Order: Squamata
- Suborder: Gekkota
- Family: Gekkonidae
- Genus: Paroedura
- Species: P. rennerae

Binomial name
- Paroedura rennerae Miralles, Bruy, Crottini, Rakotoarison, Ratsoavina, Scherz, Schmidt, Kohler, Glaw, & Vences, 2021
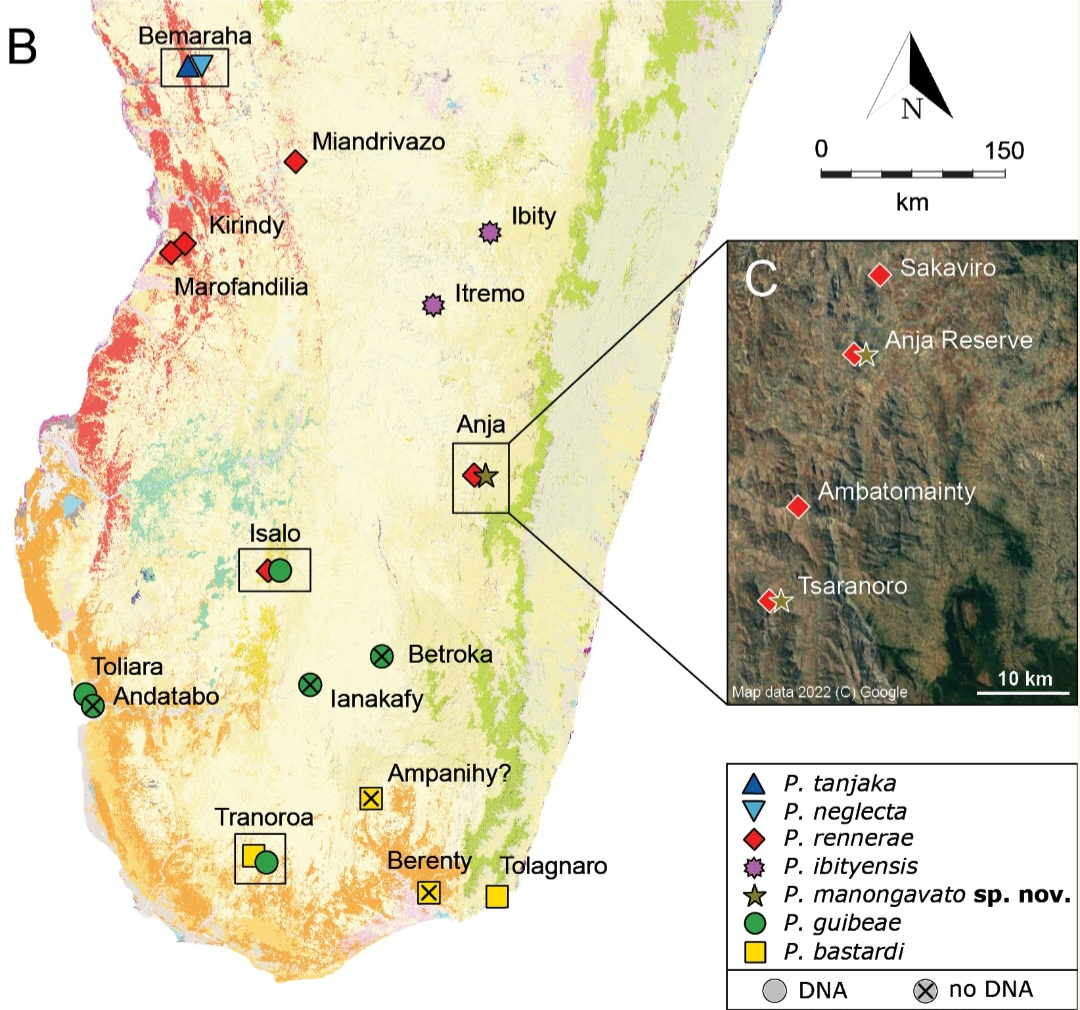
- Range of the species within the Paroedura bastardi clade, with P. rennerae indicated by the red squares

= Paroedura rennerae =

Species of lizard

Paroedura rennerae is a species of lizards in the family of the Gekkonidae. Members of this species were formerly assigned to Paroedura bastardi, but a study in 2021 found that they represent a separate species within the species complex. It is endemic to Madagascar, where it occurs in a variety of habitats.

== Taxonomy ==
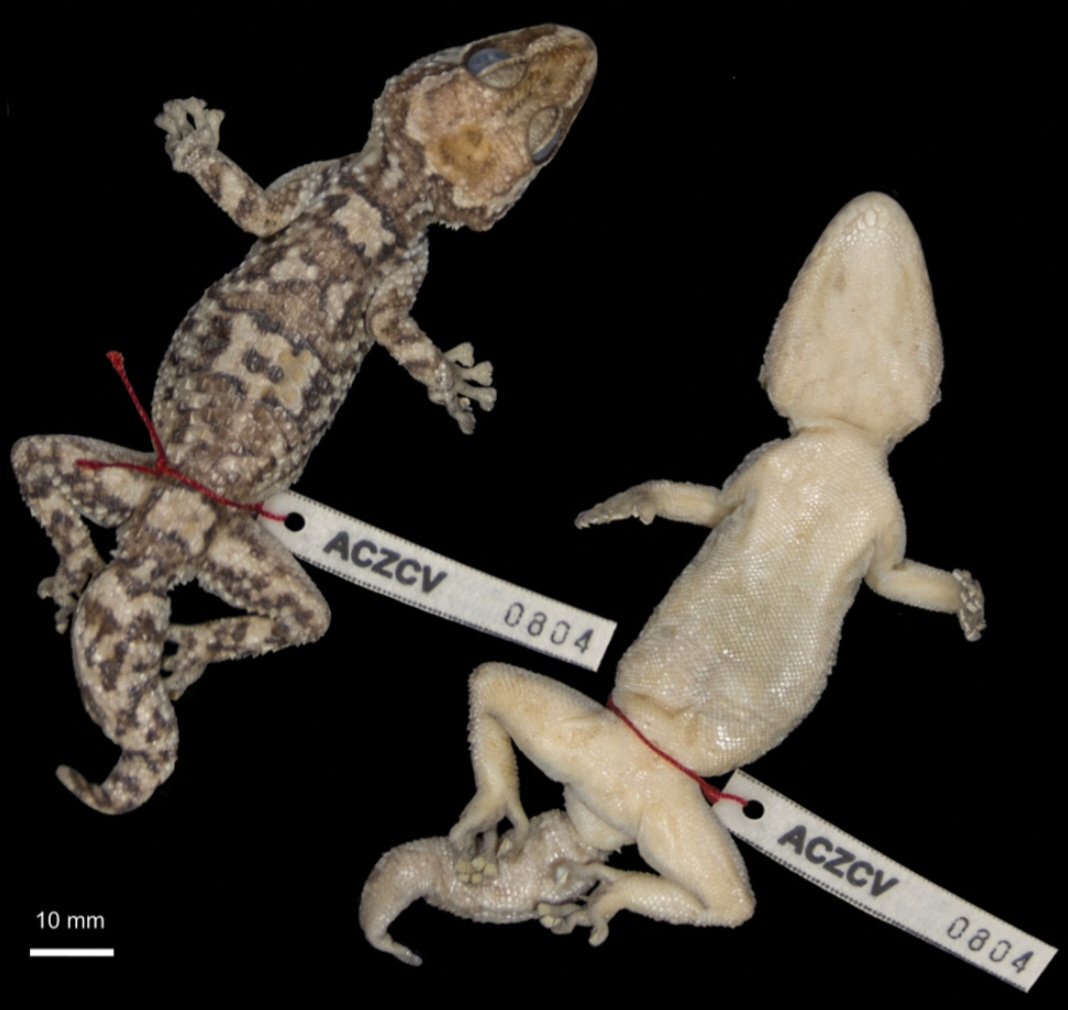
Dorsal and ventral views of a preserved specimen after 4 years in 70% ethanol

Specimens of Paroedura rennerae were not originally recognized as a separate species from Mocquard's Madagascar ground gecko, with collected specimens labelled as P. bastardi or P. sp. aff. bastardi. It was not until 2021 that an integrative revision of the P. bastardi species complex found that P. rennerae represents a morphologically and genetically distinct species. An adult female collected on 2 December 2010 from Kirindy Reserve was designated as the holotype specimen of P. rennerae. The specific name honors botanist and biologist Susanne Renner.

The following cladogram shows the position of P. rennerae among its closest relatives according to Piccoli et al. (2023):

- - Paroedura picta (Outgroup)
  - - Paroedura bastardi
    - - - Paroedura guibeae
        - Paroedura manongavato
      - - Paroedura rennerae
        - - Paroedura ibityensis
          - - Paroedura neglecta
            - Paroedura tanjaka

== Distribution and habitat ==
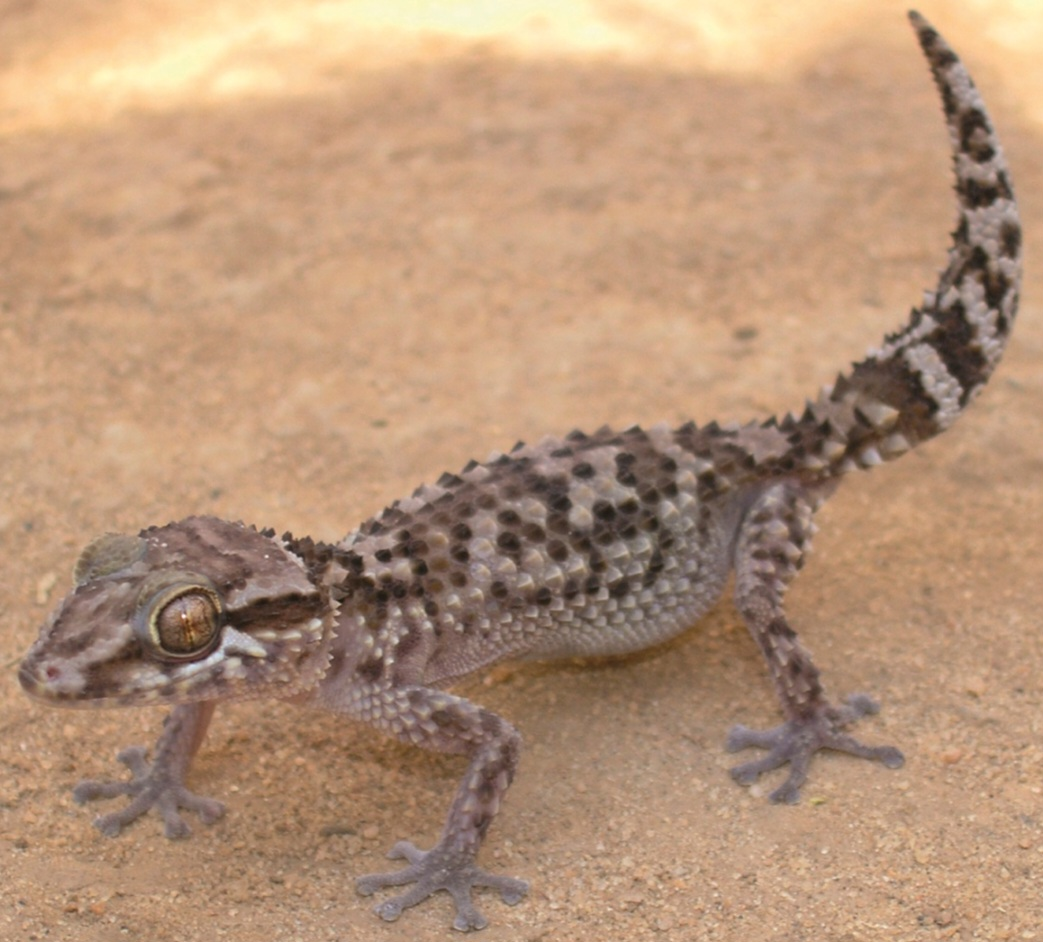
Living holotype from the Kirindy Forest

Paroedura rennerae is believed to be a widespread species across the central and southern region of Madagascar, as it has been reliably recorded from five localities of varying habitats, some of which are rather distant from each other. It has been observed in dry forests, caves, human settlements, canyons, and on large granitic boulders. Though it may occur in drier environments, some specimens have been collected from humid microhabitats such as cavities below boulders and shaded areas near waterfalls.

== Description ==
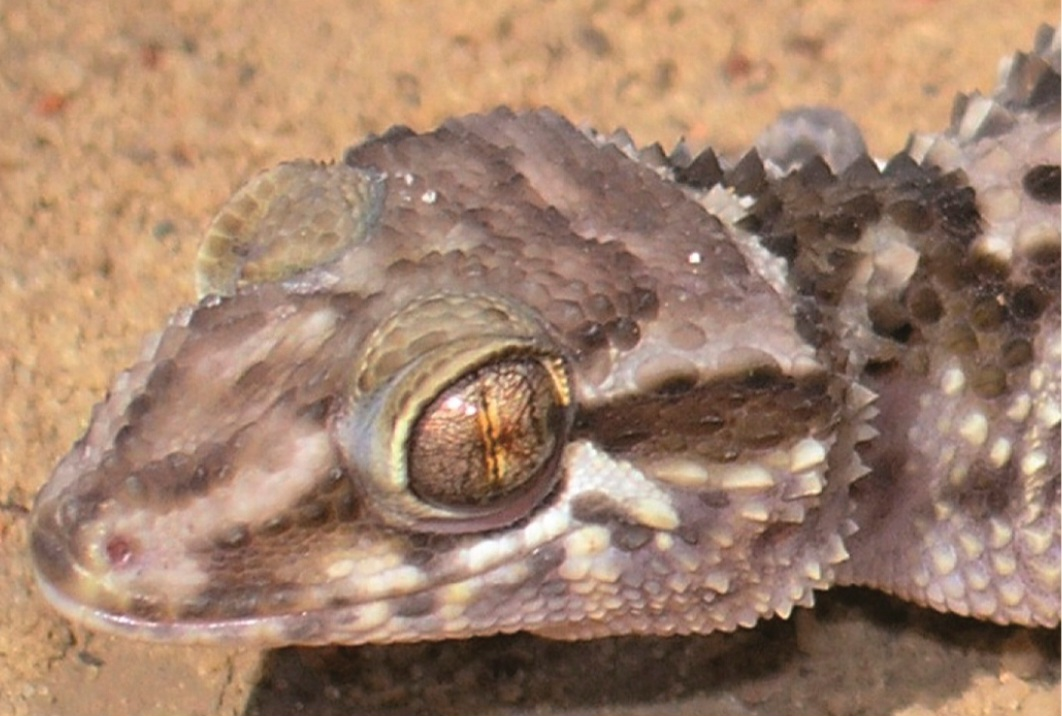
Closeup of the head

This species is large for a member of the Paroedura bastardi complex, commonly growing over 7 cm in snout–vent length, with large individuals reaching more than 8 cm. The head is wider than the neck, being comparable to the torso in width. Marked median depressions are present on the well-developed canthal ridges, and the ear opening is a vertical slit. The rectangular rostral scales, over twice as wide as they are tall, are separated from the nostrils by prenasals.

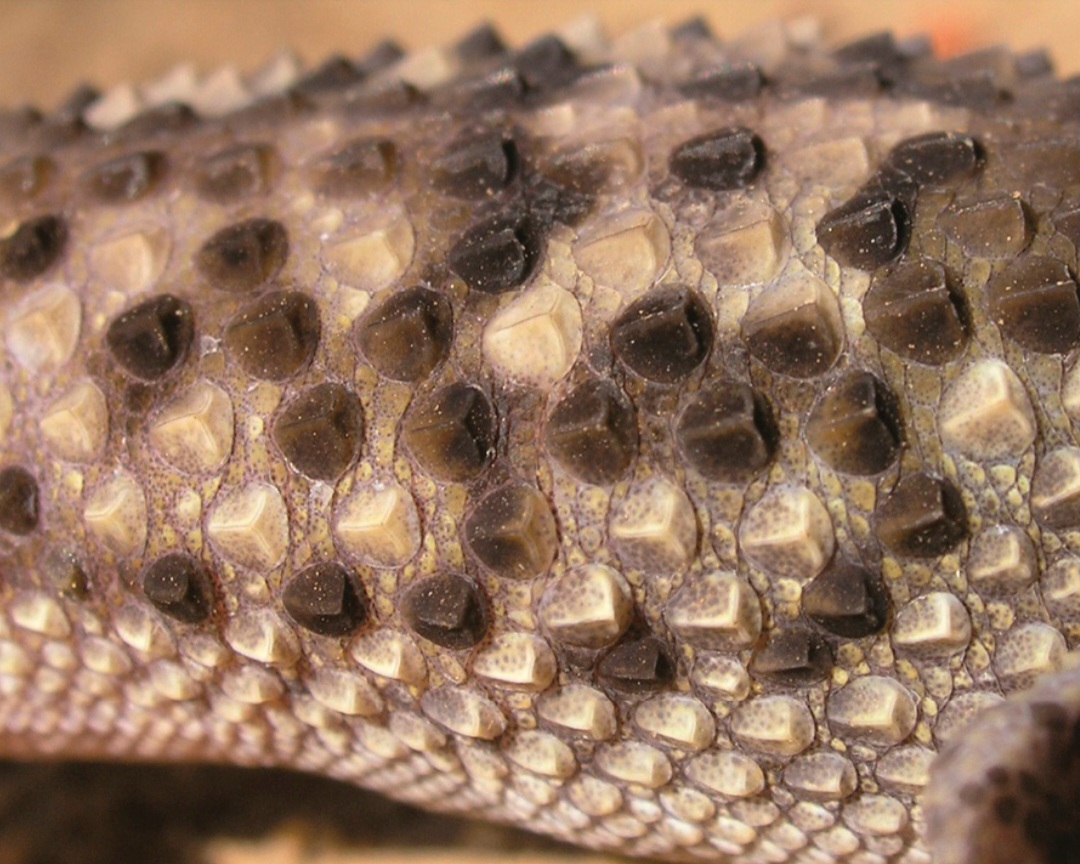
Closeup of the scales on the torso

Distinctly enlarged and spiny scales are present across the body. At the midbody, there are 17 rows of tuberculate scales arranged longitudinally. The dorsal scales of the limbs are mostly keeled and tuberculate, and the digits are expanded at the tips. The ventral scales of the forelimbs are notably smaller than the ventral scales elsewhere on the body. In adults, the tail has irregular rows of spine tubercles, whereas juveniles present these tubercles in very regular rows.

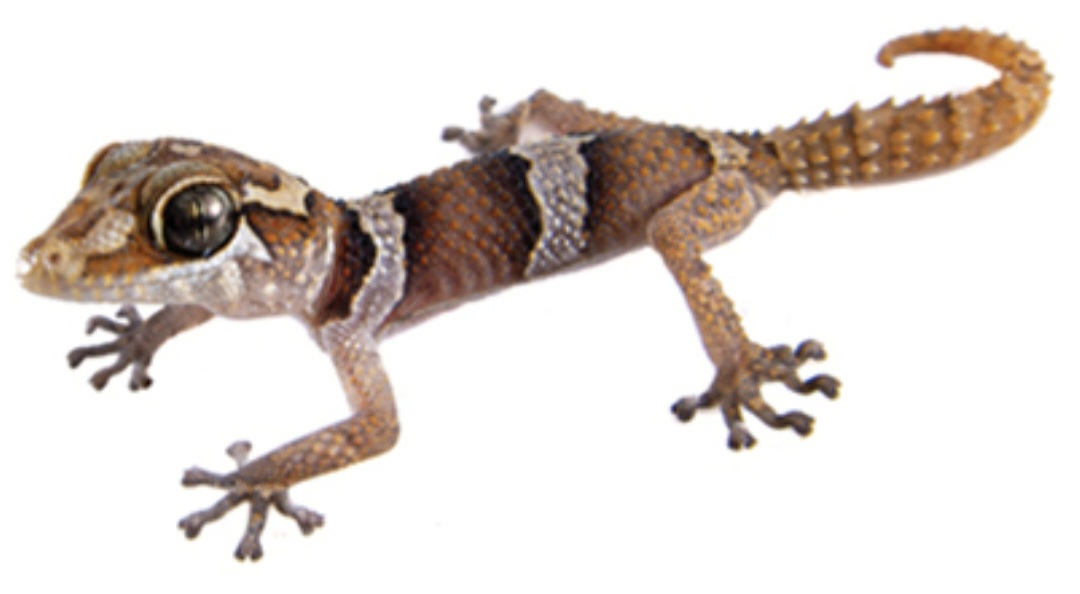
Juvenile P. rennerae showing the distinct light crossbands

This lizard has brown dorsal colors with lighter ochre crossbands which fade at the flanks, distinctly visible as they are bordered by darker colors. These crossbands are even more distinct in juveniles. Contrasting darker brown markings are present across the body. The flanks and underside are a lighter, creamy color than the dorsum.

== Biology ==
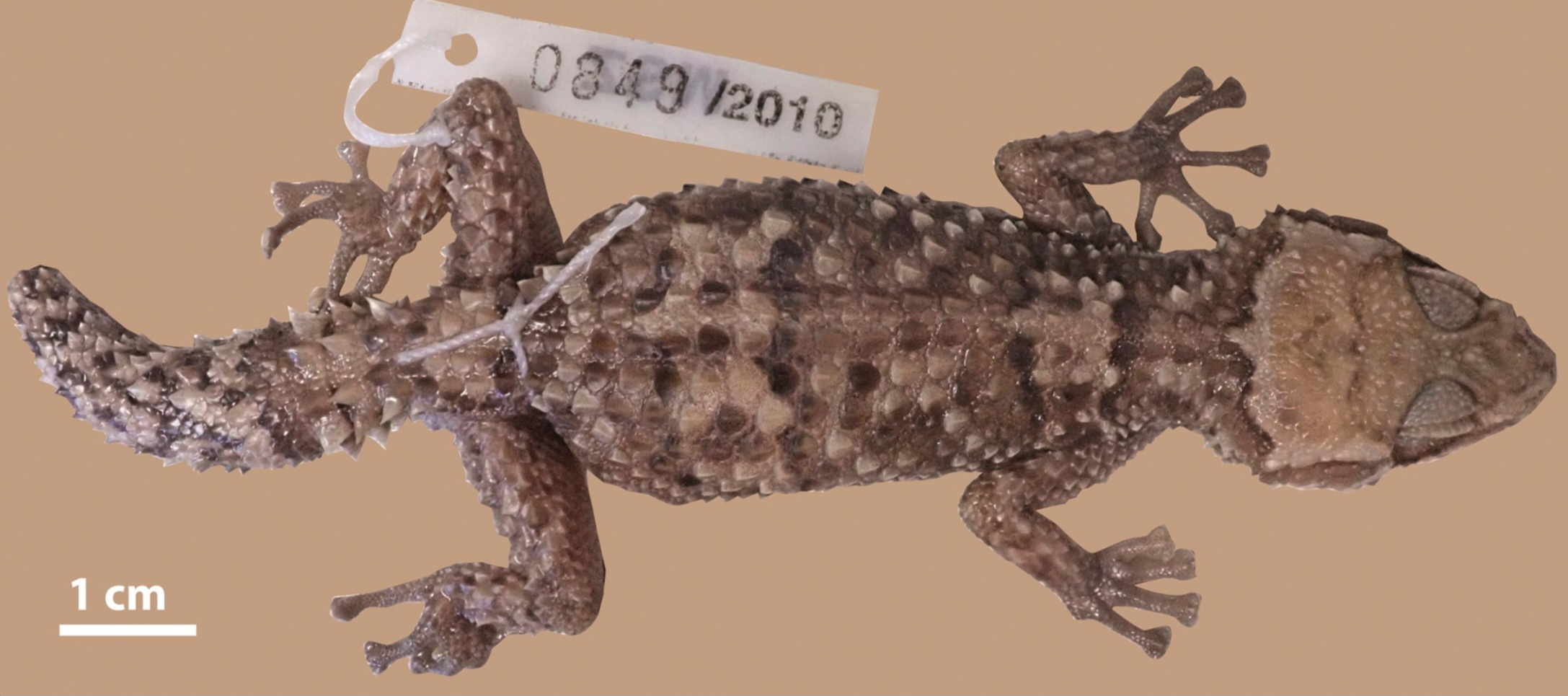
Preserved holotype showing the short, regenerated tail

Because all individuals in one study have been observed at night or near dusk, it is believed that Paroedura rennerae is a nocturnal species. This lizard has been seen climbing large boulders, tree trunks and wooden walls of huts, reaching heights of around 1 to 2 m above the ground. Similar to other species in the P. bastardi complex, P. rennerae is reported to be quick to bite when handled, likely as a defence mechanism. This species is one of many lizards known to engage in autotomy, as some specimens (including the holotype) have been found with regenerated tails, indicating it may shed its tail to evade predators.

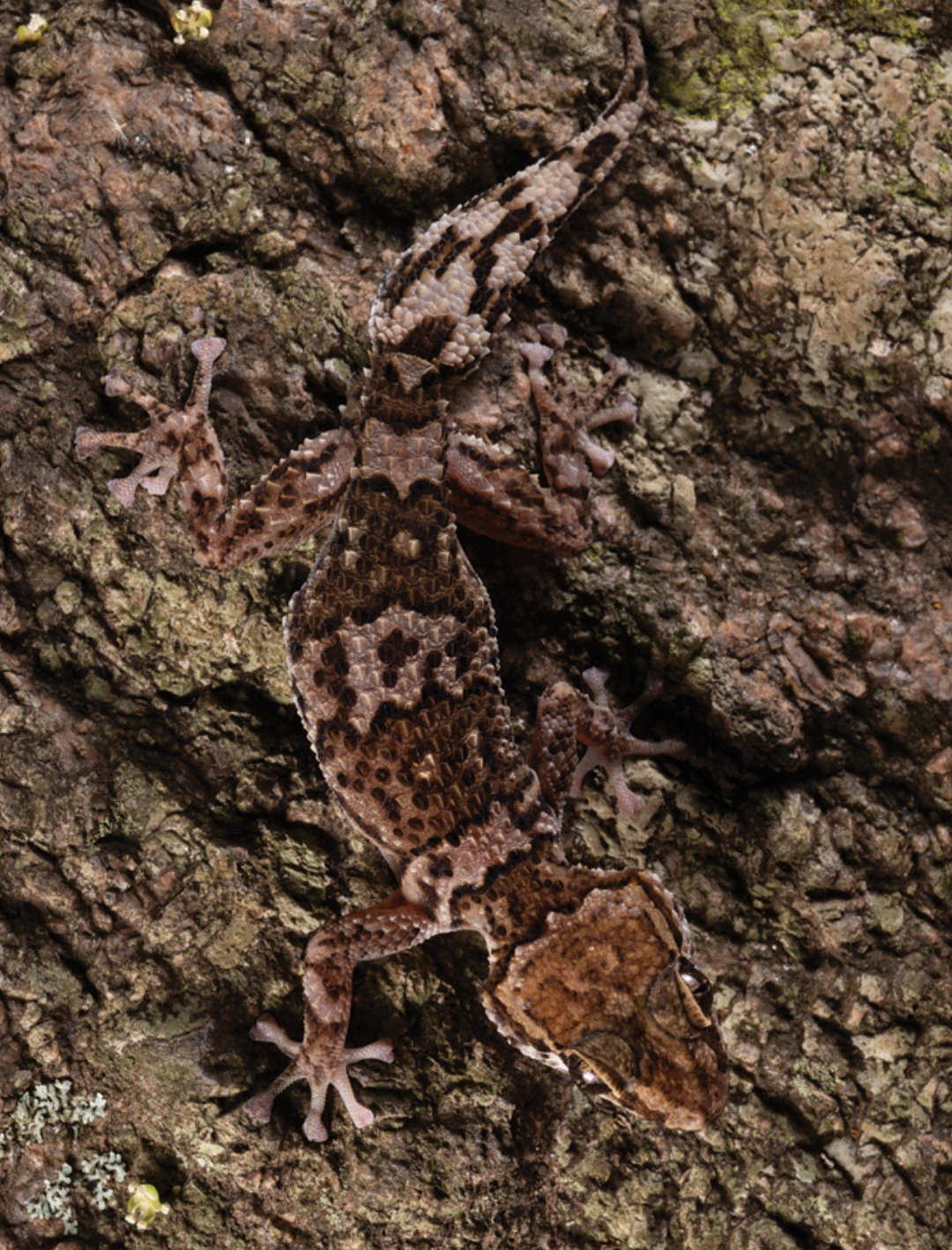
Individual from Anja Reserve climbing a tree trunk

This gecko is known to coexist with the related Paroedura manongavato, which has a much more restricted range, in both localities the latter species is known to occur. The analysed genes of the two species in the same localities show no gene flow, indicating reproductive isolation between them (possibly due to differing substrate use).
