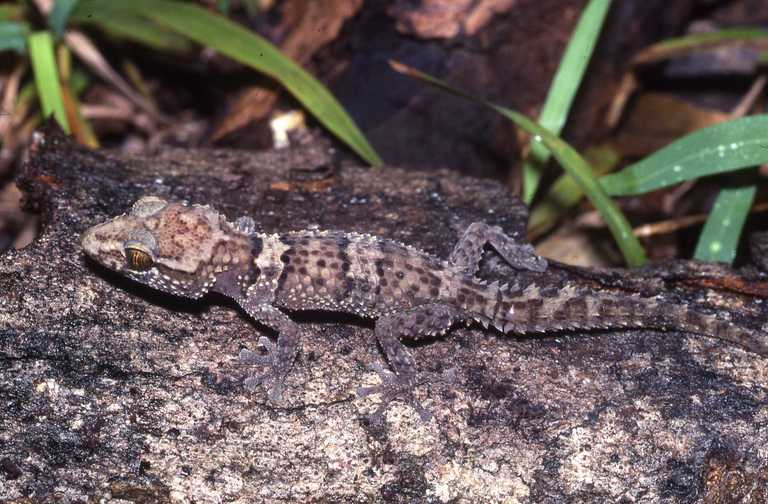
- Wild adult at Berenty Reserve

Conservation status
- Least Concern (IUCN 3.1)

Scientific classification
- Kingdom: Animalia
- Phylum: Chordata
- Class: Reptilia
- Order: Squamata
- Suborder: Gekkota
- Family: Gekkonidae
- Genus: Paroedura
- Species: P. bastardi

Binomial name
- Paroedura bastardi (Mocquard, 1900)
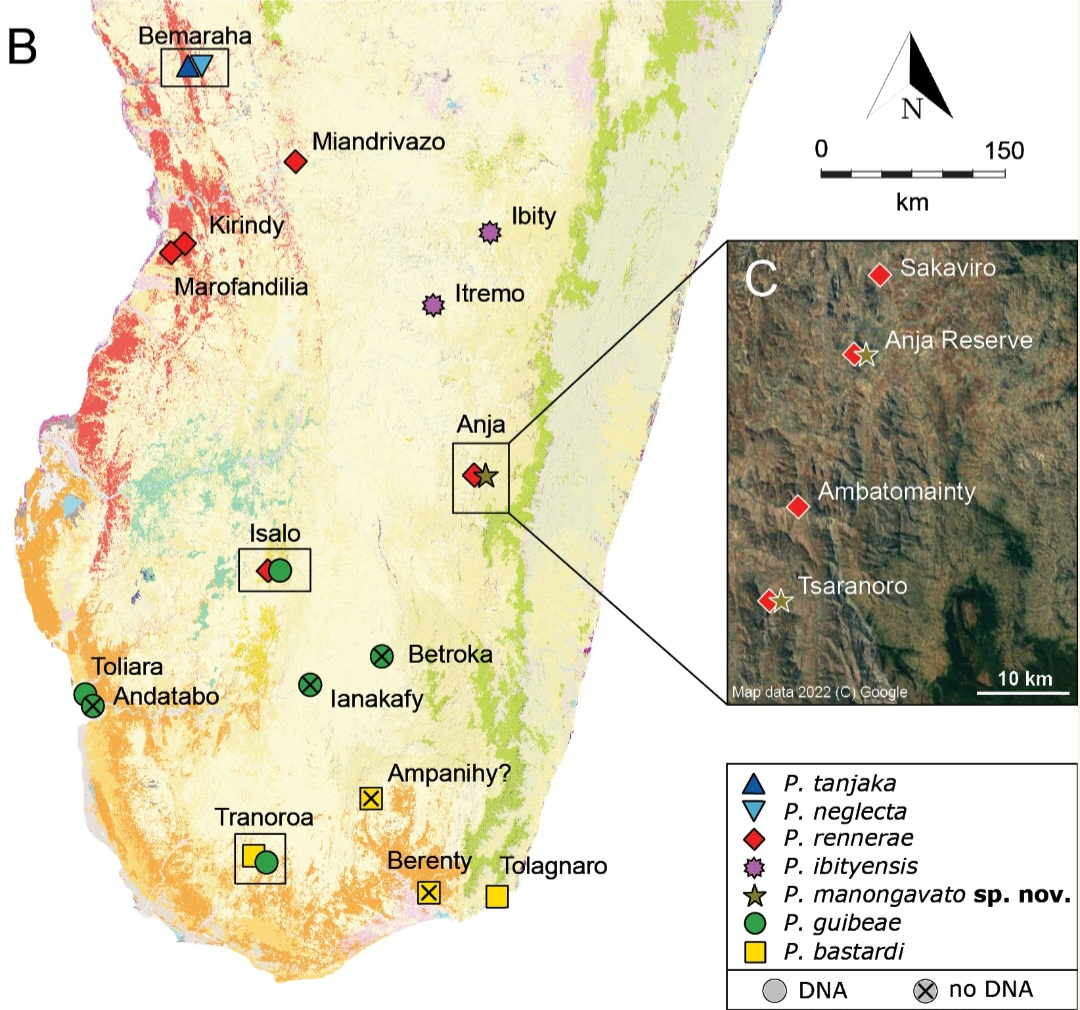
- Range of the species within the Paroedura bastardi clade, with P. bastardi indicated by the yellow squares

Synonyms
- Phyllodactylus bastardi Mocquard, 1900; Paroedura bastardi — Dixon & Kroll, 1974

= Mocquard's Madagascar ground gecko =

Species of lizard

Mocquard's Madagascar ground gecko (Paroedura bastardi) is a species of lizard in the family Gekkonidae. It is a moderately-sized reptile reaching just over 7 cm (2.8 in) in snout–vent length. The species is endemic to southeastern Madagascar, where it can be found on the ground or climbing tree trunks.

Although it was formerly thought to be a widespread species throughout much of west and south Madagascar, morphological and genetic analyses have found that this was due to misclassification, and that this definition of the species is actually a species complex comprising several cryptic species. Today, it is known that P. bastardi in the strict sense is actually restricted to the extreme southeast of the country.

== Taxonomy ==
The Mocquard's Madagascar ground gecko was first described in 1900 by François Mocquard under the scientific name Phyllodactylus bastardi. The specific name, bastardi, is in honor of French paleontologist Eugène Joseph Bastard (1865–1910). In 1974, several Malagasy species assigned to Phyllodactylus were reassigned to the genus Paroedura, including this species (renamed as Paroedura bastardi). The Ibity ground gecko was initially described as a subspecies of Mocquard's Madagascar ground gecko, but has been recognized as a separate species since 2008.

The type series is made up of 5 syntypes, and the species was formerly thought to include populations from across much of Madagascar. However, several molecular analyses of mitochondrial and nuclear DNA sequences in the 2010s have found that this supposed species was actually paraphyletic, with the Ibity ground gecko nested among several distinct mitochondrial lineages assigned to Mocquard's Madagascar ground gecko. The type series was also found to include individuals from at least two of these lineages. These lineages are now recognized as cryptic species within the Paroedura bastardi species complex, and a juvenile specimen was designated as the lectotype of P. bastardi sensu stricto. One of the cryptic lineages was reclassified by Miralles et al. (2021) as Paroedura guibeae, originally described in 1974 and later synonymized with P. bastardi, with the study supporting its resurrection as a separate species. The same study named another one of the cryptic species as Paroedura rennerae. In 2023, the name Paroedura manongavato was given to the cryptic lineage found in Anja and Tsaranoro.

The following cladogram is based on a multilocus phylogenetic analysis and shows the position of P. bastardi among its closest relatives according to Piccoli et al. (2023):

- - Paroedura picta (Outgroup)
  - - Paroedura bastardi
    - - - Paroedura guibeae
        - Paroedura manongavato
      - - Paroedura rennerae
        - - Paroedura ibityensis
          - - Paroedura neglecta
            - Paroedura tanjaka

== Distribution and habitat ==
Older sources commonly state that Mocquard's Madagascar ground gecko is found across western and southern Madagascar in dry forests, shrubland, and rocky areas, at altitudes of 40–800 m (130–2,620 ft). However, this is due to the fact that several lineages now known to be distinct were once assigned to this species, and the aforementioned range is actually that of the species complex as a whole. Miralles et al. (2021) found that "true" Paroedura bastardi are only known from the extreme southeast of Madagascar, and that records of this species from elsewhere on the island actually represent other cryptic species including P. rennerae, P. guibeae and P. manongavato. There is some overlap in range among members of the species complex, with P. bastardi and P. guibeae occurring sympatrically in Tranoroa.

== Description ==
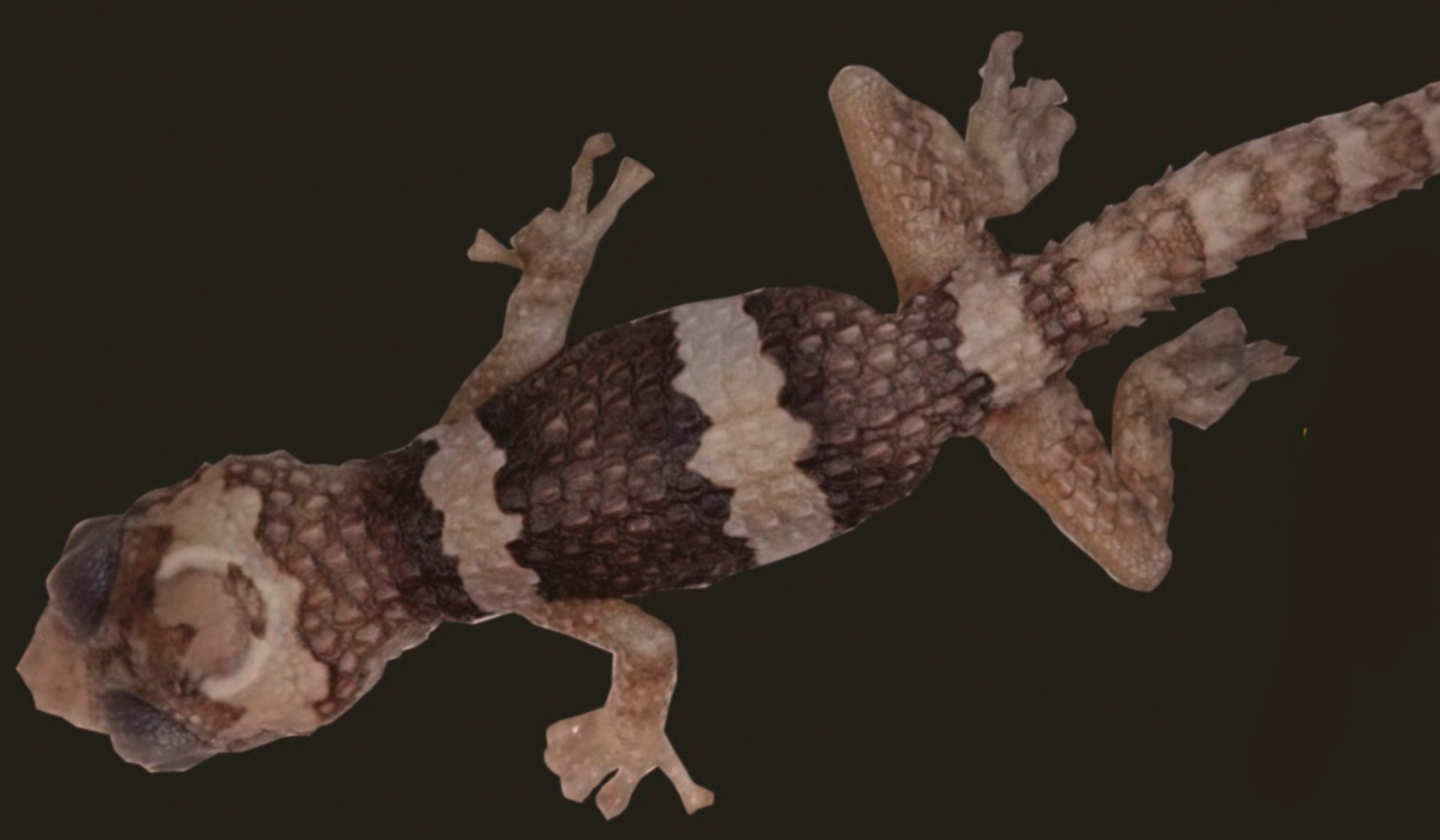
Juvenile specimen from Tolagnaro

The Mocquard's Madagascar ground gecko is a moderately-sized species which may attain a snout-to-vent length (SVL) of approximately 7.1–7.3 cm (2.8–2.9 in). The triangular head is distinctly wider than the neck, and the ear opening is a vertical slit. Like its closest relatives, the dorsal surface of this species has enlarged keeled scales arranged in longitudinal rows. The tail has spiny tubercles, which in juveniles are arranged more regularly than in adults. The limbs are robust, with lamellae-lined toe pads that are wider than the rest of the digit.

The body is a tawny brown color with scattered grayish spots and three lighter crossbands. The bands are most prominent in younger individuals, where they may be white with dark borders, whereas in adults they are less distinct. Juveniles also have a distinct pattern on the head which has been described as "butterfly or bat-shaped" that becomes less visible with age. There is no banded patterning on the digits.

== Behaviour ==
This gecko is a terrestrial species capable of climbing, and can be seen on the ground or on vertical wooden surfaces such as tree trunks. It and other species of the P. bastardi complex have been reported to be quick to bite when handled, likely as a defence mechanism. It is oviparous, laying eggs which the female buries in substrate. While this species is known to coexist with the related Paroedura guibeae in Tranoroa, molecular evidence indicates there is reproductive isolation between the two species.

== Conservation ==
This species was listed as Least Concern by the IUCN in 2011 due to "its wide distribution" and because it is unlikely to be declining. However, this assessment occurred before the Paroedura bastardi species complex was split into several lineages, and its range is now known to be more restricted than originally thought. Severe deforestation and slash-and-burn practices since the 1950s have drastically changed the landscape in south-central Madagascar, and some related species are known to be threatened by the resulting habitat loss. This species itself is not confirmed to be affected or declining. Mocquard's Madagascar ground gecko is known to be collected for international pet trade, though the severity of this has not been assessed.

== Gallery ==
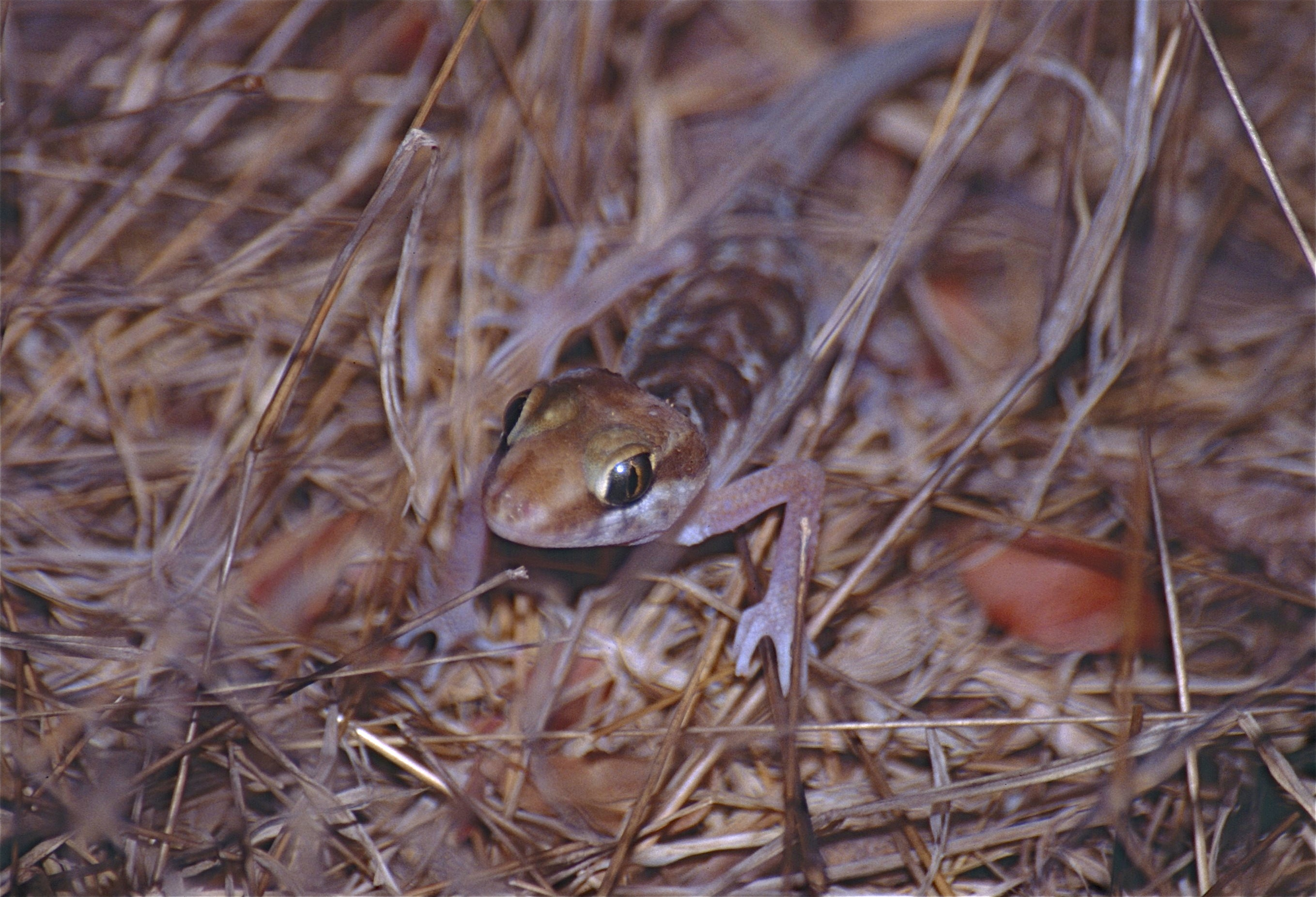
Front facing specimen at Kirindy Forest

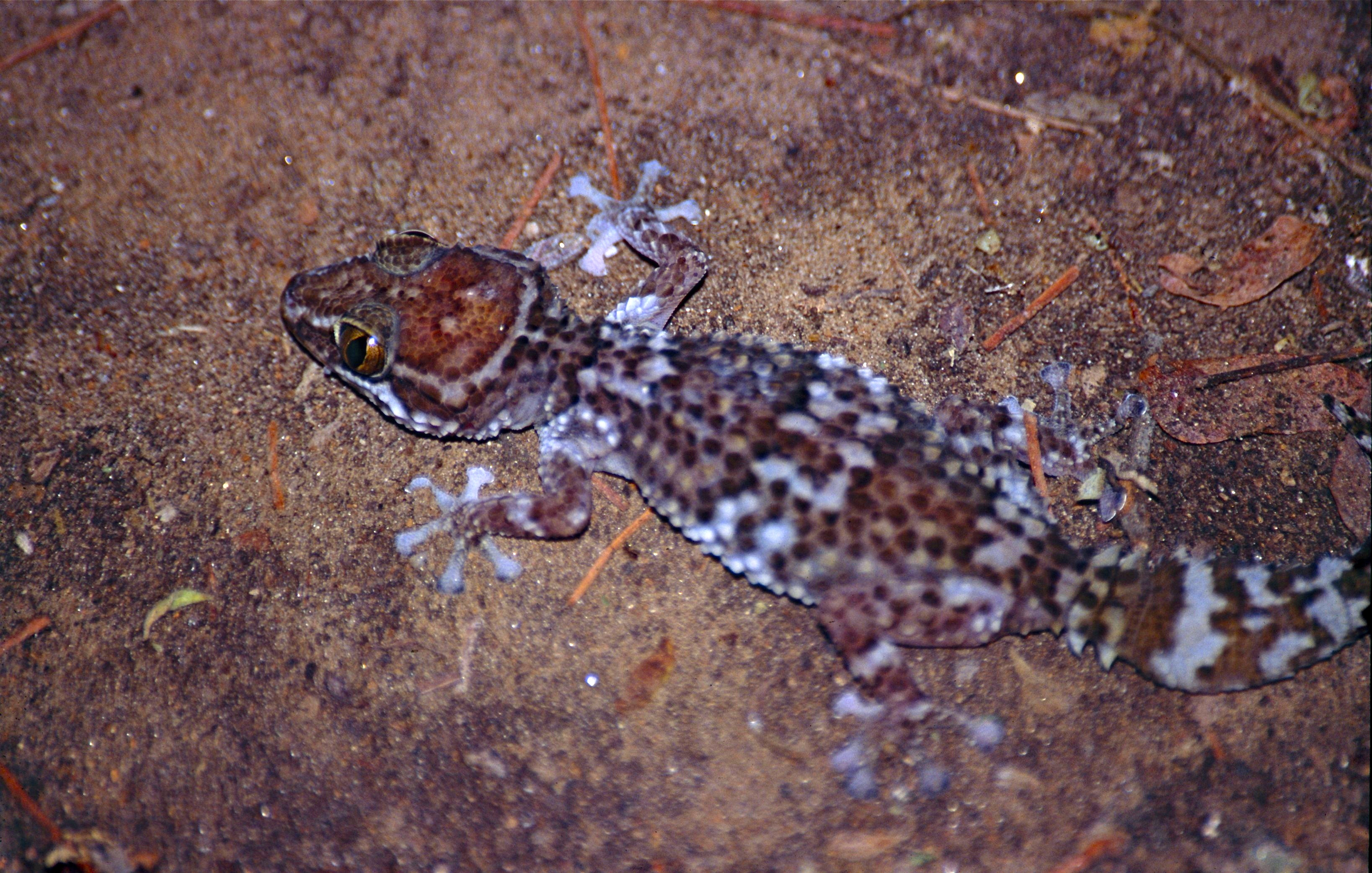
Dorsal view of a wild adult

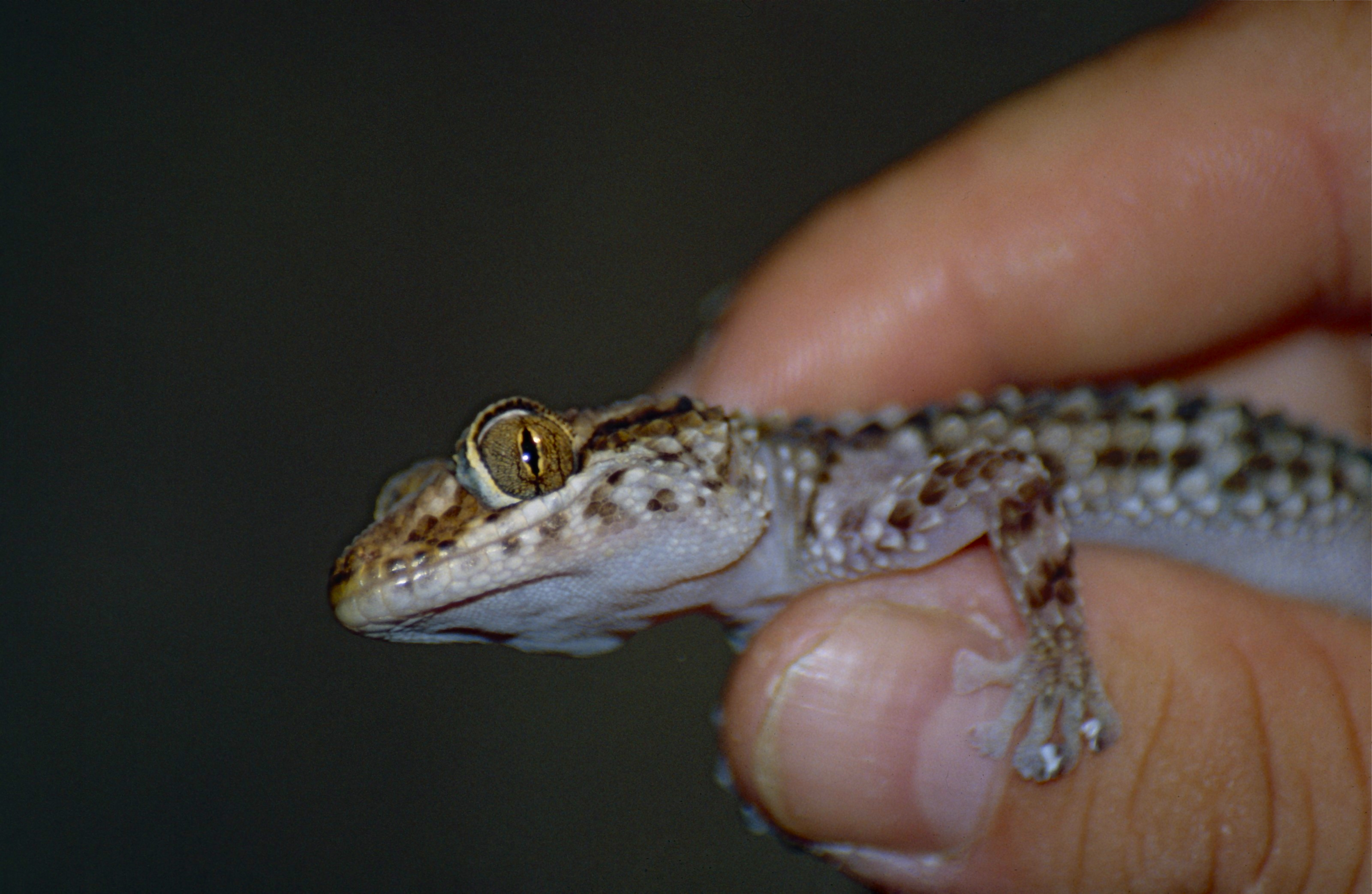
Adult being handled in Berenty Reserve
