= Paroedura tanjaka =

Conservation status
- Endangered (IUCN 3.1)

Scientific classification
- Kingdom: Animalia
- Phylum: Chordata
- Class: Reptilia
- Order: Squamata
- Suborder: Gekkota
- Family: Gekkonidae
- Genus: Paroedura
- Species: P. tanjaka

Binomial name
- Paroedura tanjaka Nussbaum & Raxworthy, 2000
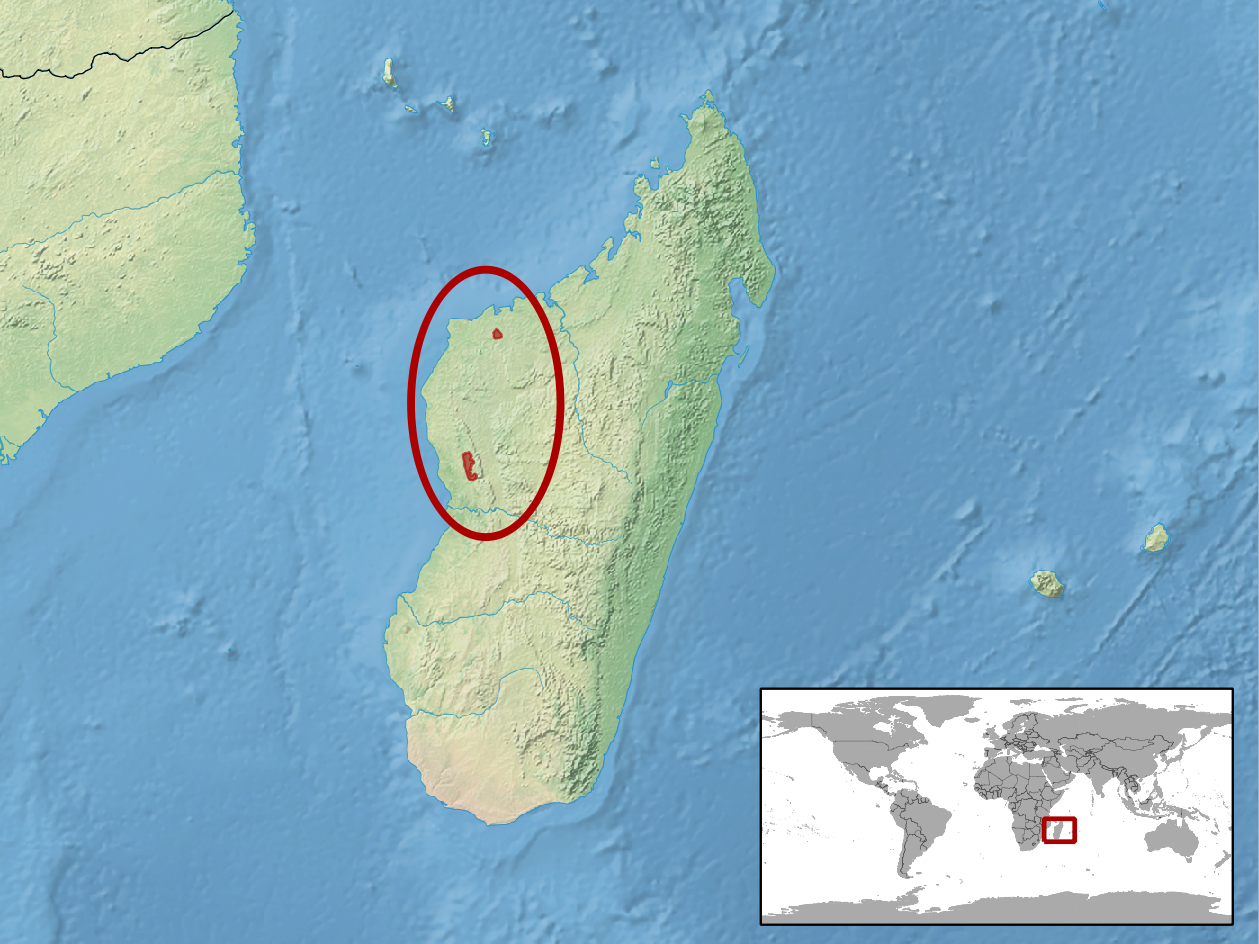
- Approximate distribution of Paroedura tanjaka

Species of lizard

Paroedura tanjaka is a species of lizard in the family Gekkonidae. It is endemic to northwestern Madagascar, and is currently known only to occur in Bemaraha and Namoroka. This nocturnal species is found in karstic dry forests at night, and is known to dwell in caves during the day. It is one of the largest species in the genus Paroedura, reaching up to 18 cm in length.

The species was first discovered in 1996 and officially named in 2000. Because its range is extremely limited and its habitat is declining, it is listed as Endangered by the IUCN Red List. While it is not the subject of any conservative measures, its known locations have been designated as national parks.

== Taxonomy ==
The species Paroedura tanjaka was first erected in 2000 by Nussbaum and Raxworthy. The holotype (UMMZ 224225) is a mature male collected from Bemaraha Nature Reserve in Madagascar on 18 March 1996. Several other individuals from the Bemaraha and Namoroka reserves were collected as paratypes. The specific name tanjaka is a Malagasy word for "strength".

Genetic analysis has found that Paroedura tanjaka is a member of the Paroedura bastardi clade, and is a sister taxon to Paroedura neglecta. The following cladogram shows the position of P. tanjaka among its closest relatives according to Piccoli et al. (2023):

- - Paroedura picta (Outgroup)
  - - Paroedura bastardi
    - - - Paroedura guibeae
        - Paroedura manongavato
      - - Paroedura rennerae
        - - Paroedura ibityensis
          - - Paroedura neglecta
            - Paroedura tanjaka

== Distribution and habitat ==
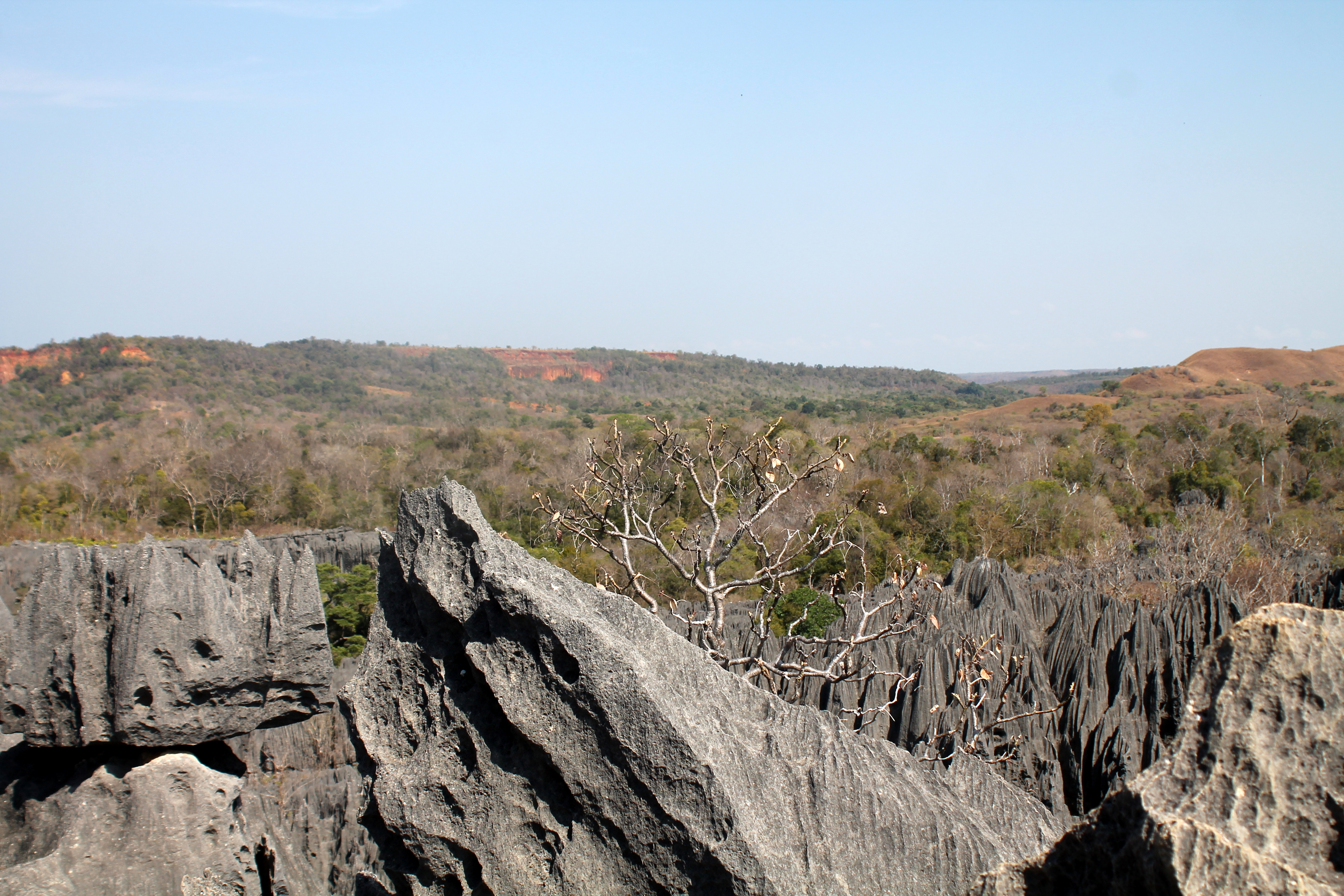
View of the karstic forest at Tsingy de Bemaraha National Park

This gecko is one of many species endemic to the island nation of Madagascar, and is currently known only from Tsingy de Bemaraha and Tsingy de Namoroka in the west-central region of the country. It has only been found at elevations of 100 to 500 m in areas representing deciduous dry forests with limestone outcrops. The known extent of occurrence of this species is only 964 km², and while it could be more widespread, it is unlikely to have an extent of occurrence over 5,000 km². It is known to inhabit caves within its range during the day.

== Description ==
This species is among the largest Paroedura species, reaching a snout–vent length of 10.2 cm and a total length of 18 cm. The head is wider than the neck, and the rostral scale makes contact with the nostrils. The prominent canthal bridge is concave and the snout is steeply sloped in front of the eyes. Enlarged tuberculate scales are present on the dorsal surface and not arranged in clear rows, with smaller tubercles and flat scales separating them. Unlike in some congeneric species, the tail is not spiny. The digits end with widened toe pads, each over twice the width of the rest of the digit.

The head has an immaculate tan color and posterolaterally bordered by light lines, differing from the rest of the body. The dorsalateral surface has grayish background colors, with irregular brown spots and bands all over. These bands of color extend to the tail, but are more faded in regenerated tails. Juveniles have three distinct light crossbands on the torso and black to brown dorsal colors.

== Behaviour ==
Paroedura tanjaka is a nocturnal species, active in its dry forest during the night. It is a terrestrial species capable of climbing, reportedly found mostly 1 to 4 meters above the ground on the bases of tsingy cliffs, or 0.5 to 2.5 meters up on tree branches and trunks. During the day, this gecko is known to inhabit karst caves, and the first observation of this species during the day was 30 meters within a cave. Later expeditions have made dozens of observations of this gecko inhabiting a cave throughout the daytime, always in areas of complete darkness away from the entrance. P. tanjaka is known to actively hunt and even mate in these caves during the day, and it is suggested that the darkness of caves allows this nocturnal species to be active throughout the day and avoid predators.

=== Diet ===
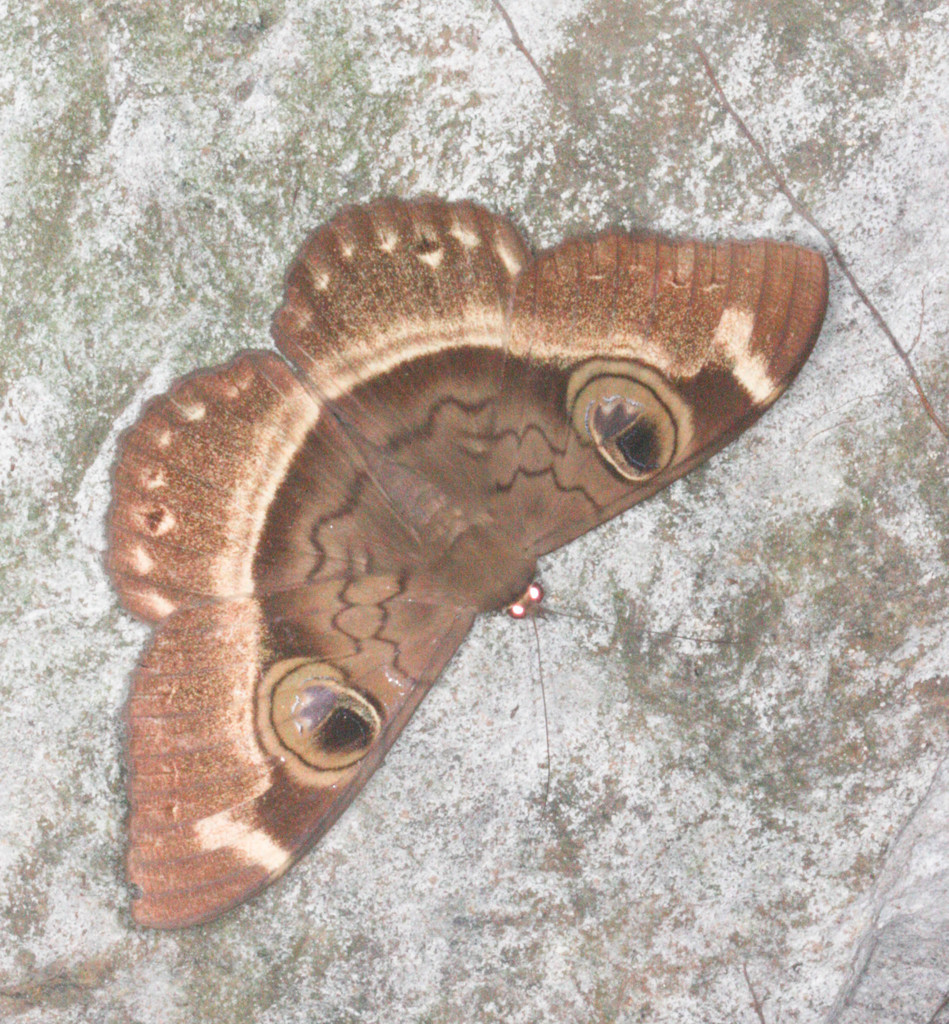
Cyligramma duplex, a putative prey species for Paroedura tanjaka

Like most geckos, Paroedura tanjaka is an insectivorous species and primarily preys upon small arthropods, hunting them at night in the karstic forests. As it dwells in caves during the day where various invertebrates have been observed, it is believed to hunt by day in these caves as well. Both troglobitic invertebrates and nocturnal species resting to avoid predation or daytime heat (including the moth Cyligramma duplex) are present in the caves, and likely are part of the lizard's diet.

=== Predation ===
This lizard is known to fall prey to snakes, as one specimen (UMMZ 221997) was found inside the stomach of a Lycodryas gaimardi. The genus Lycodryas as a whole has been regarded as predators of Paroedura geckos, and birds and mammals may also represent predators of this species.

== Conservation ==
Due to its narrow extent of occurrence and the decline of its severely fragmented habitat, Paroedura tanjaka is listed as Endangered on the IUCN Red List. Because of its restricted range, this lizard is disproportionately threatened by changes to its forest habitat. Though the species is reportedly abundant at Bemaraha, there is continuing decline of mature individuals, and its habitat is threatened by increased fire intensity and logging. Conservative measures are not in place for the species itself, but both its known localities (Bemaraha and Namoraka) are national parks and thus protected areas.
