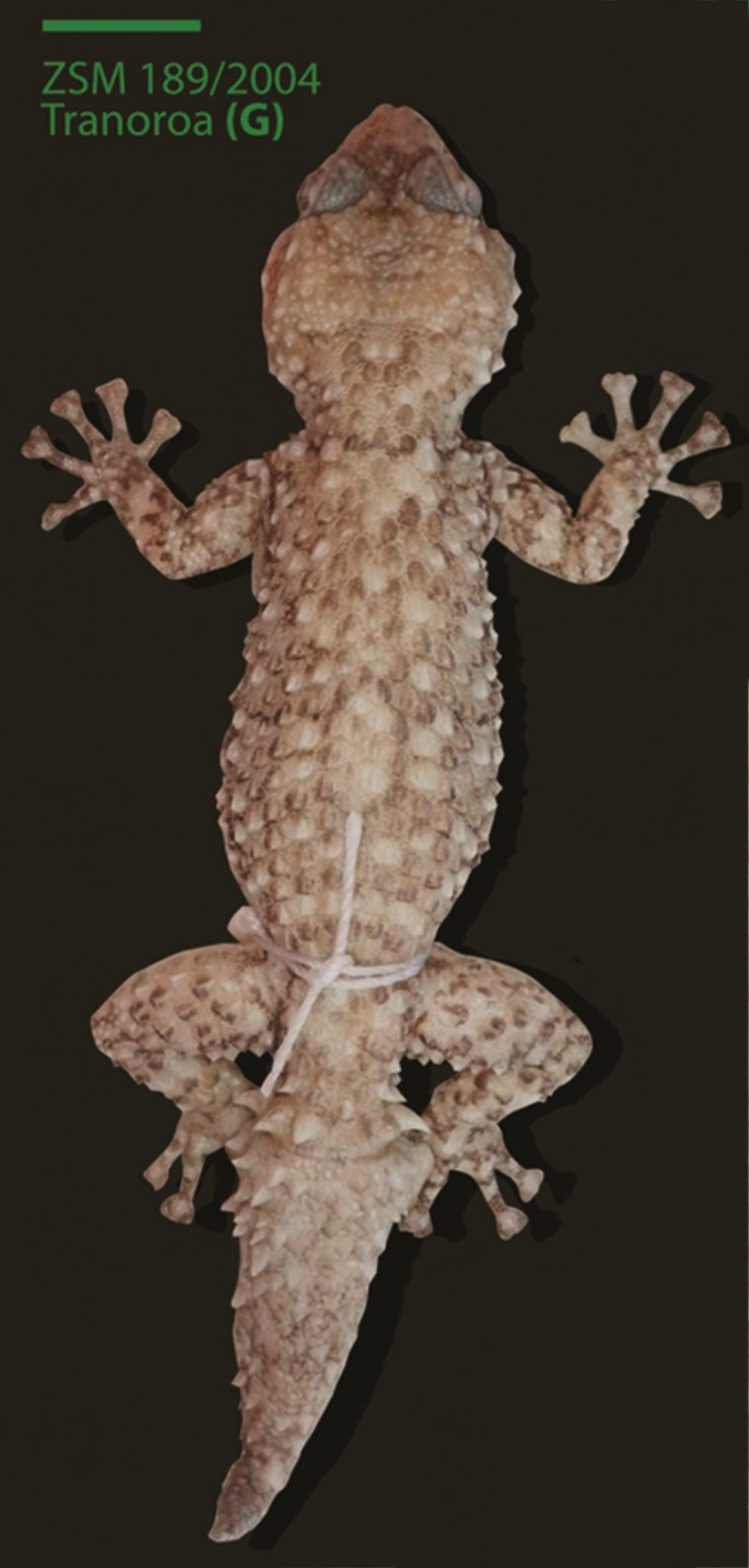
- Specimen collected from Tranoroa

Scientific classification
- Kingdom: Animalia
- Phylum: Chordata
- Class: Reptilia
- Order: Squamata
- Suborder: Gekkota
- Family: Gekkonidae
- Genus: Paroedura
- Species: P. guibeae

Binomial name
- Paroedura guibeae Dixon & Kroll, 1974
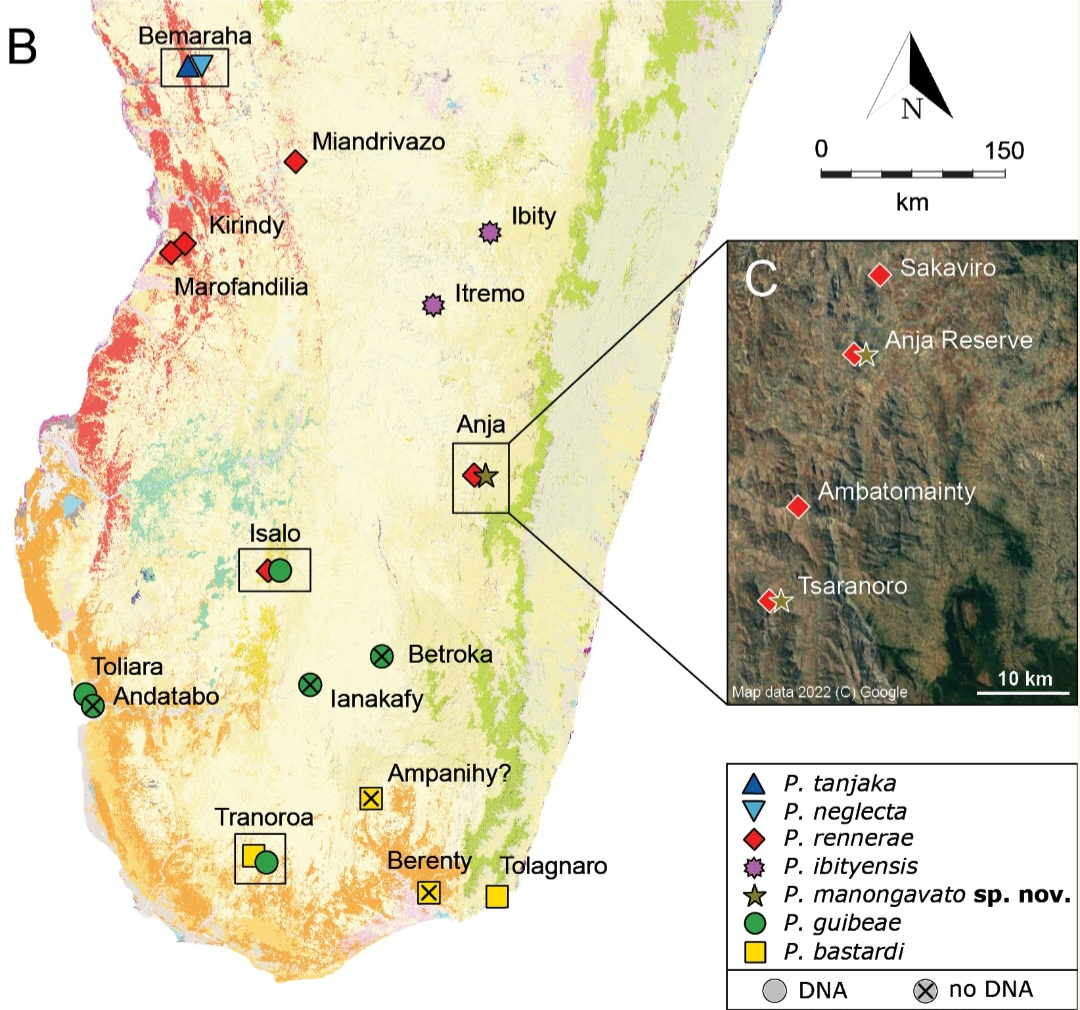
- Range of the species within the Paroedura bastardi clade, with P. guibeae indicated by the green circles

= Paroedura guibeae =

Species of lizard

Paroedura guibeae, Guibé's ground gecko, is a species of lizard in the family Gekkonidae. The species was formerly synonymized with Paroedura bastardi, but a study in 2021 found that it represents a separate species within the species complex. It is endemic to Madagascar.

== Taxonomy ==
Paroedura guibeae was initially described in 1974, with the holotype being an adult male collected 10 km south of Betroka on 14 June 1953. Although Nussbaum and Raxworthy synonymized the species with the Mocquard's Madagascar ground gecko (P. bastardi) in 2000, an integrative revision of the P. bastardi species complex in 2021 found that P. guibeae represents a morphologically and genetically distinct species, and thus the taxon name was resurrected.

It has been found that at least four mitochondrial lineages are contained within P. guibeae, of which two have been considered to be distinct candidate species. Taxonomic assessment of the P. guibeae clade is thus required to clarify their species status. Within the P. bastardi species complex, the P. guibeae lineage from Tranoroa has been recovered as the sister taxon to Paroedura manongavato. The following cladogram shows the position of P. guibeae among its closest relatives according to Piccoli et al. (2023):

- - Paroedura picta (Outgroup)
  - - Paroedura bastardi
    - - - Paroedura guibeae
        - Paroedura manongavato
      - - Paroedura rennerae
        - - Paroedura ibityensis
          - - Paroedura neglecta
            - Paroedura tanjaka

In 2004, the specific name was changed by Michels and Bauer to guibei, as the species was named after Mr. (not Ms.) Jean Guibé. However, Miralles et al. (2021) criticized the use of the species name P. guibei, as this emendation is incorrect from a nomenclatural perspective according to the articles of the ICZN. Under this reasoning, guibei has no valid use and the original spelling guibeae does not need to be emended.

== Distribution and habitat ==
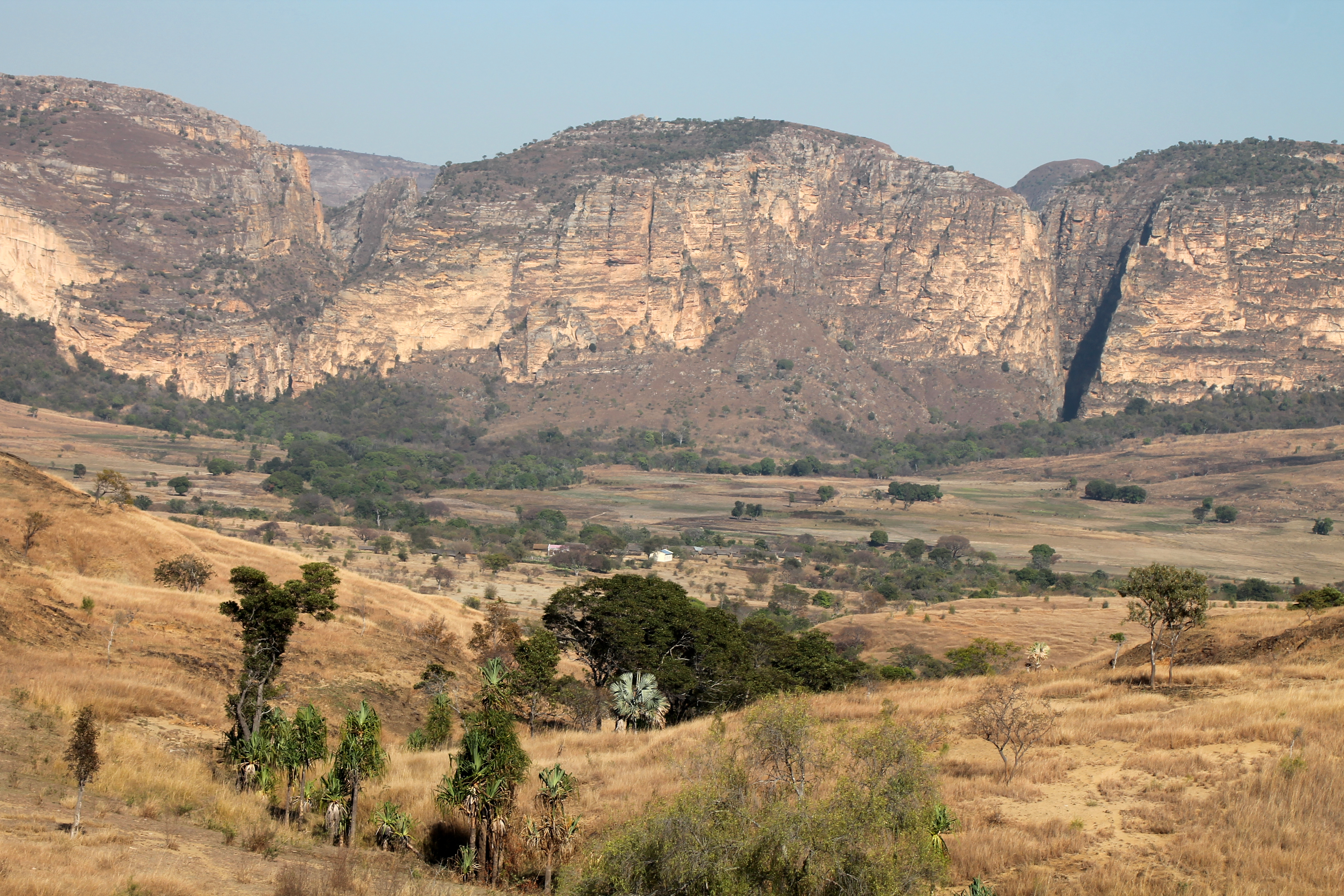
View of Isalo National Park, a location where P. guibeae is known to occur

This reptile is one of many species endemic to the island nation of Madagascar, and has been observed in several localities in the southern region of the country. It is reported to mostly occur on the surfaces of rocks near canyon entrances in open grasslands. While Guibé's ground gecko is known to occur syntopically with the related Paroedura rennerae at least in one site (Zahavola in Isalo), the latter species has a preference for more humid microhabitats.

== Description ==
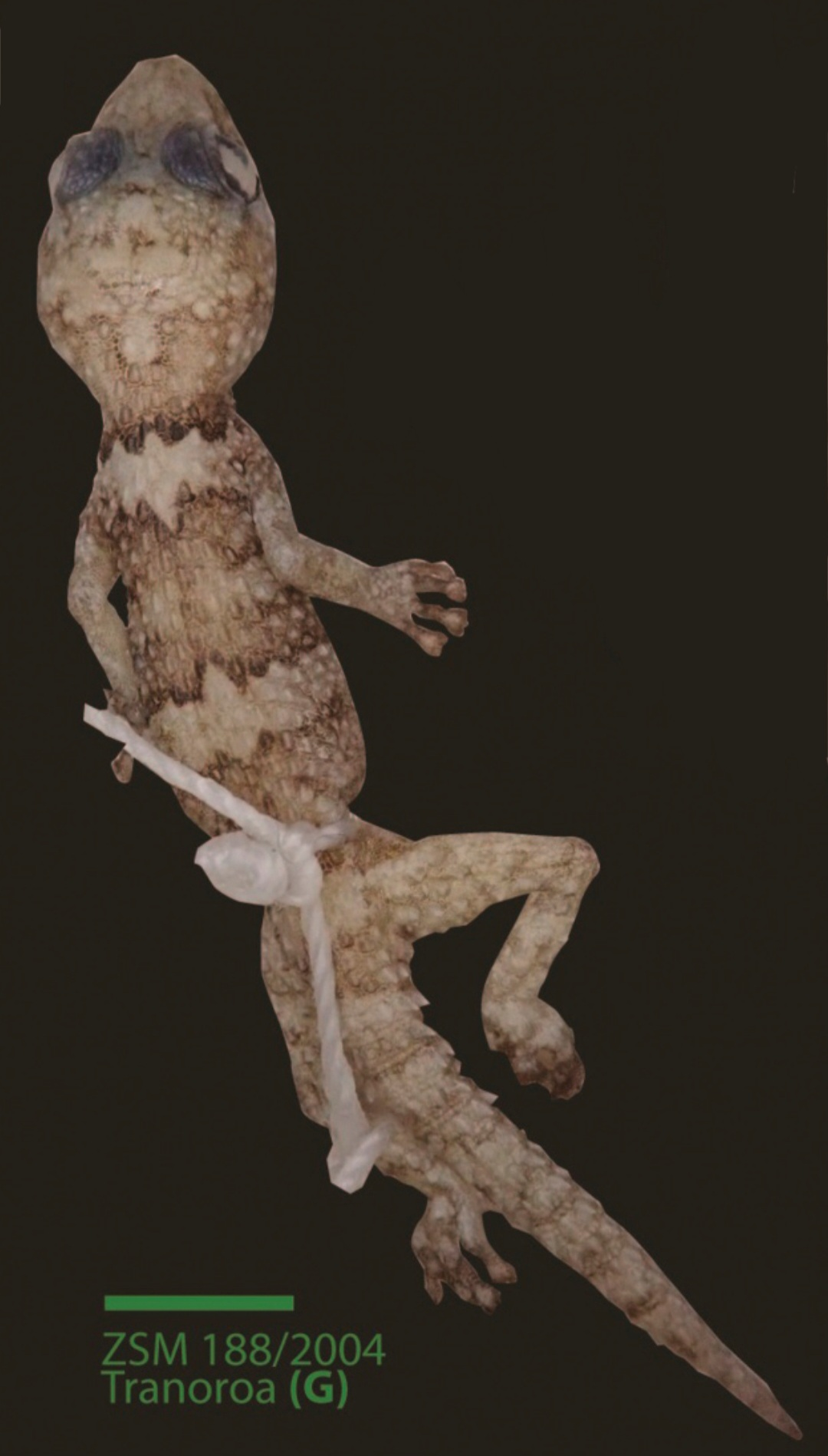
Juvenile specimen of P. guibeae from Tranoroa

Guibé's ground gecko is a moderately-sized species, reaching a maximum snout–vent length of 6 cm. Although the initial description of this species stated the nostrils are in contact with the rostral and first labial scales, later examination of the type material found this to be false and that the rostral scale is actually separated from the nostrils by prenasals. Enlarged, keeled scales are present on the dorsum (including on the dorsal surfaces of the limbs), arranged in regular longitudinal rows. The digits end with posteriorly-tapering toe pads about twice as wide as the rest of the digit, each with a claw that is visible when seen from below. This lizard is mostly light tan in color, with slightly darker reticulated patterning. Banded patterning is present on the digits of this species, a feature absent in the related Mocquard's Madagascar ground gecko and Paroedura rennerae.
