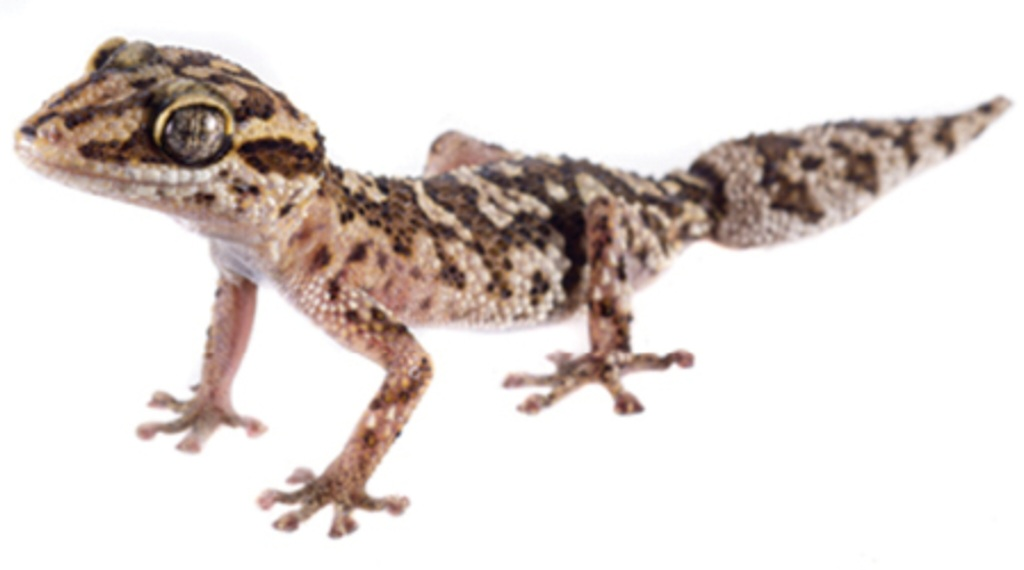
- Adult from Anja Reserve

Conservation status
- Critically Endangered (IUCN 3.1)

Scientific classification
- Kingdom: Animalia
- Phylum: Chordata
- Class: Reptilia
- Order: Squamata
- Suborder: Gekkota
- Family: Gekkonidae
- Genus: Paroedura
- Species: P. manongavato

Binomial name
- Paroedura manongavato Piccoli, Belluardo, Lobón-Rovira, Alves, Rasoazanany, Andreone, Rosa & Crottini, 2023
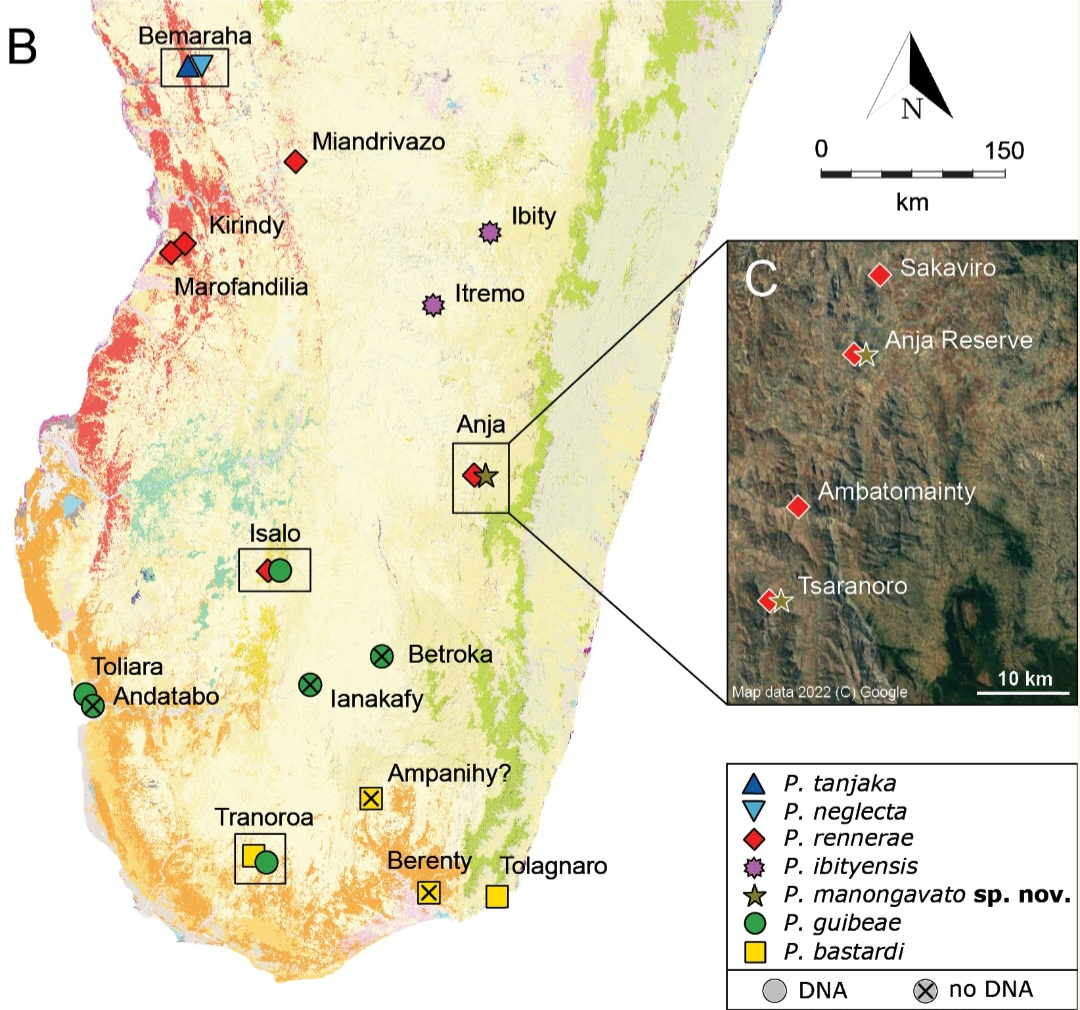
- Range of the species within the Paroedura bastardi clade, with P. manongavato indicated by the five-pointed stars

= Paroedura manongavato =

Species of lizard

Paroedura manongavato is a species of lizard in the family Gekkonidae. It was described as a distinct species in 2023, and while specimens have been known for years prior, they were formerly assigned to Paroedura bastardi. It is a microendemic species found only in two locations (Anja Reserve and Tsaranoro) in Madagascar.

== Taxonomy ==
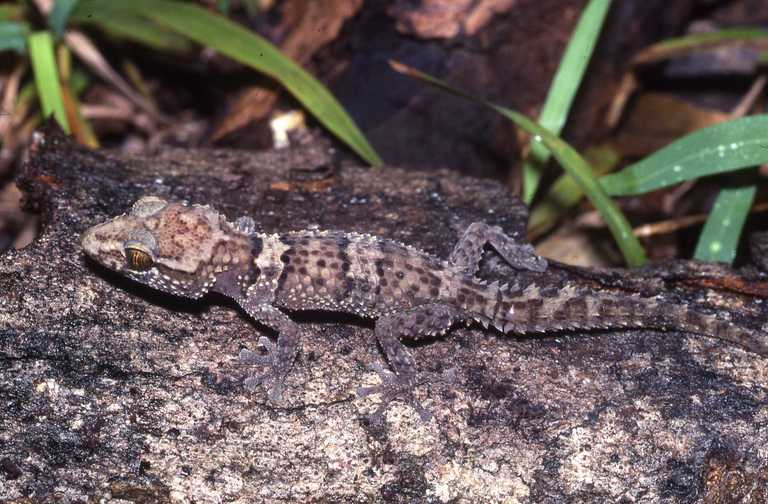
Mocquard's Madagascar ground gecko, a closely related species which P. manongavato was formerly thought to be conspecific with

Paroedura manongavato was formerly not recognized as a separate species from the Mocquard's Madagascar ground gecko (Paroedura bastardi), with collected specimens being referred to P. bastardi or P. sp. aff. bastardi in 2021. A study in 2023 found that P. manongavato is a distinct species using genetic and morphological data. The holotype specimen was collected on 27 November 2014 and represents an adult female. The specific name is derived from the Malagasy words "manonga" (meaning "to climb") and "vato" (meaning "rock").

Phylogenetic analysis has found this species to be a sister taxon to the Paroedura guibeae lineage. However, the P. guibeae clade requires taxonomic assessment to clarify their species status as it has been found to include at least four mitochondrial lineages, of which two have been deemed distinct candidate species. The following cladogram shows the position of P. manongavato among its closest relatives according to Piccoli et al. (2023):

- - Paroedura picta (Outgroup)
  - - Paroedura bastardi
    - - - Paroedura guibeae
        - Paroedura manongavato
      - - Paroedura rennerae
        - - Paroedura ibityensis
          - - Paroedura neglecta
            - Paroedura tanjaka

== Distribution and habitat ==
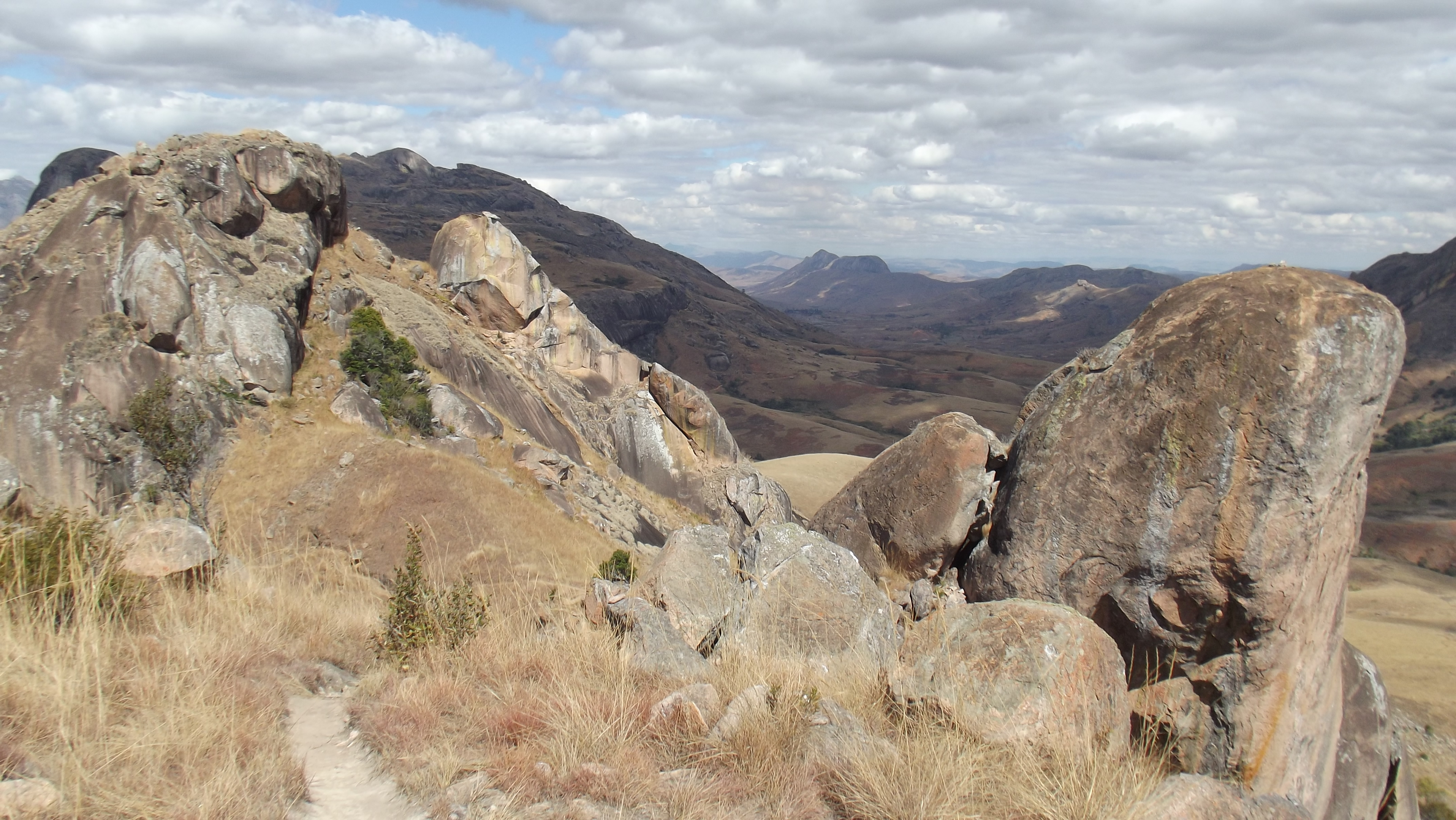
Large boulders in Tsaranoro

This gecko is currently only known from two localities on the south-central plateau of Madagascar: Tsaranoro Valley Forest (Forêt Sacrée) and Anja Reserve, which are about 25 km apart. The species is described as microendemic, and has an estimated Extent of Occurrence and Area of Occupancy of 3.032 km² and 12 km² respectively. Both these localities represent semi-arid deciduous forests. Individuals have been observed on granitic boulders and in cavities below them, and the species appears closely associated with these boulders. Although smaller areas of forest such as Sakaviro and Ambatomainty exist nearby, this reptile is not known to occur in them, potentially indicating a certain forest structure and canopy cover are needed to maintain populations.

== Description ==
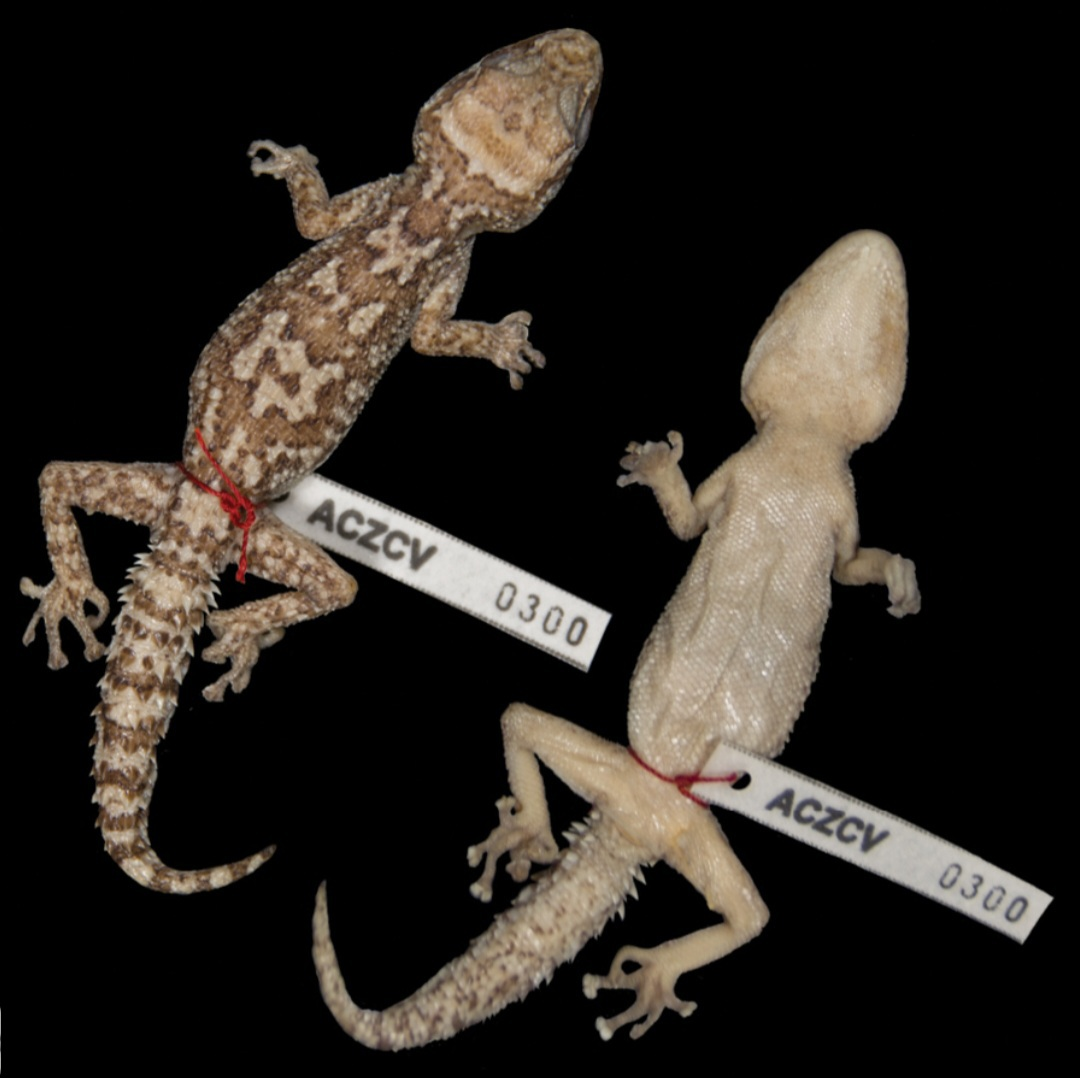
Dorsal and ventral views of the holotype after 9 years in 70% ethanol

The holotype individual has a snout–vent length of 68.3 mm, with a triangular head measuring 19.9 mm long, 15.3 mm wide and 8.7 mm tall. The rostral scale and nostrils are separated by prenasals. Regular longitudinal rows of dorsal-enlarged keeled scales are prominently present. The tail is 49 mm long, with very spiny and mostly keeled scales. The dorsal scales of the limbs are similarly keeled, and the digits possess expanded tips with downward-curving claws and adhesive pads. This lizard has ochre and light brown background colors with contrasting darker brown markings across the body. In juveniles, the dorsum has three broad light crossbands.

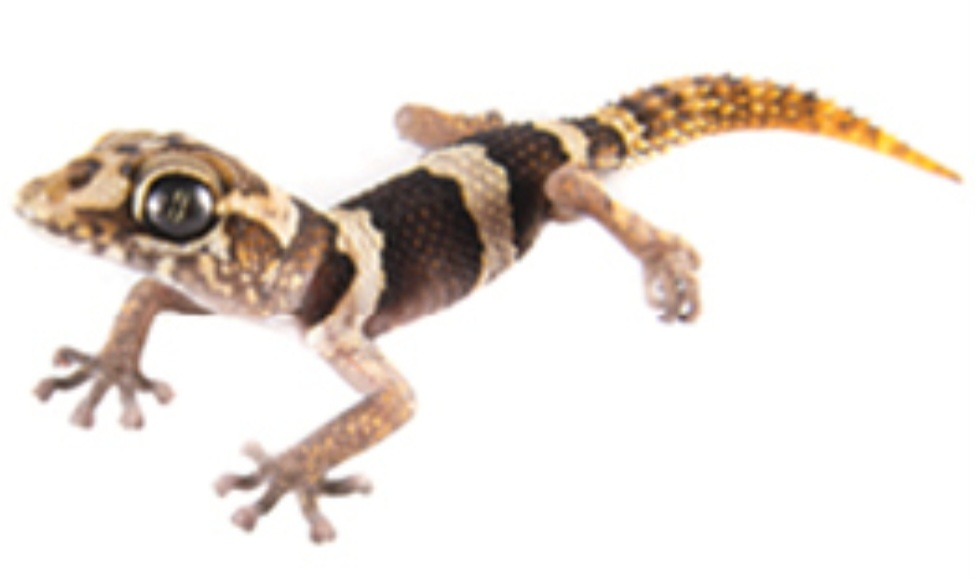
Juvenile P. manongavato showing the three light crossbands

== Biology ==
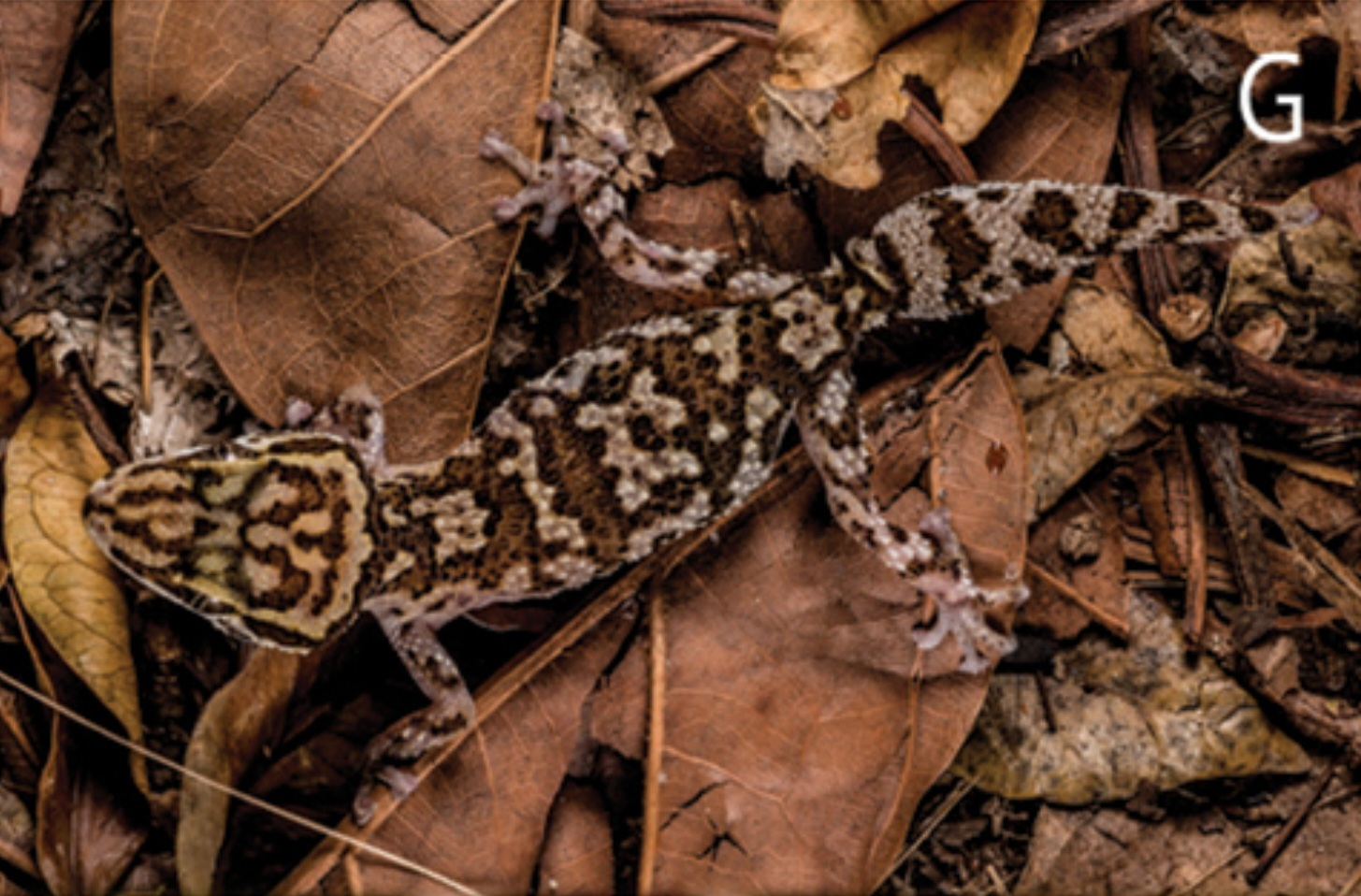
Individual from Anja Reserve in leaf litter

Paroedura manongavato has been observed to be active during both day and night, and always in close association with large granitic boulders. It is a terrestrial species which climbs on said boulders and can reach heights of around 1.5 meters off the ground. One individual is noted to have jumped off the boulder it was climbing and onto the leaf litter below when spotted, suggesting this may be a defensive behavior of the species. Though found in semi-arid forests, this gecko may have a preference for humid environments such as the cavities and caves formed by the granitic boulders.

In both localities it is known from, P. manongavato lives alongside the related P. rennerae, which is a more widespread species occurring in a wider range of habitats. The analysed genes of the two species in the same localities show no gene flow, indicating reproductive isolation between them (possibly due to differing substrate use).

== Conservation ==
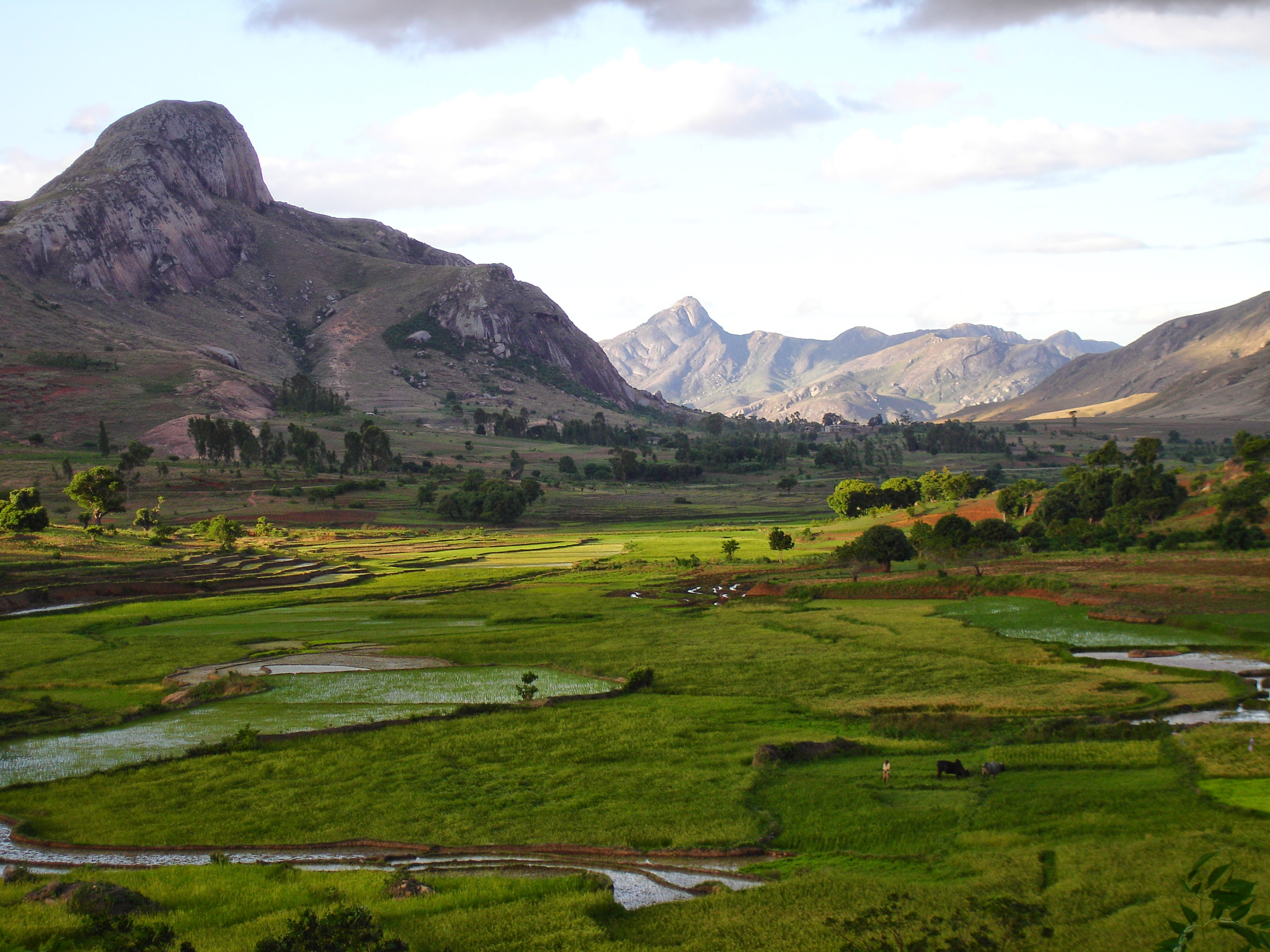
Agricultural land in Anja Reserve

Due to its narrow extent of occurrence and the decline of its extremely fragmented habitat, it has been proposed that Paroedura manongavato be listed as Critically Endangered under the IUCN Red List guidelines. Severe deforestation and slash-and-burn since the 1950s have drastically changed the landscape in south-central Madagascar, increased soil erosion and affected water retention of the soil. This gecko is now found only in two fragmented areas of forest surrounded by anthropogenically-modified habitats such as roads, settlements and farmland.

Though the species itself has not been the subject of conservative measures, both its known localities (Anja Reserve and Tsaranoro) are managed by local community associations which actively protect these areas from deforestation using the income from donations and ecotourism, with Anja being designated as a community-managed reserve in 1999. The continued protection of these sites and promotion of sustainable land use is deemed essential for the survival of multiple microendemic species found within, including this gecko.
