= Paroedura neglecta =

Scientific classification
- Kingdom: Animalia
- Phylum: Chordata
- Class: Reptilia
- Order: Squamata
- Suborder: Gekkota
- Family: Gekkonidae
- Genus: Paroedura
- Species: P. neglecta

Binomial name
- Paroedura neglecta Köhler, Vences, Scherz, & Glaw, 2019
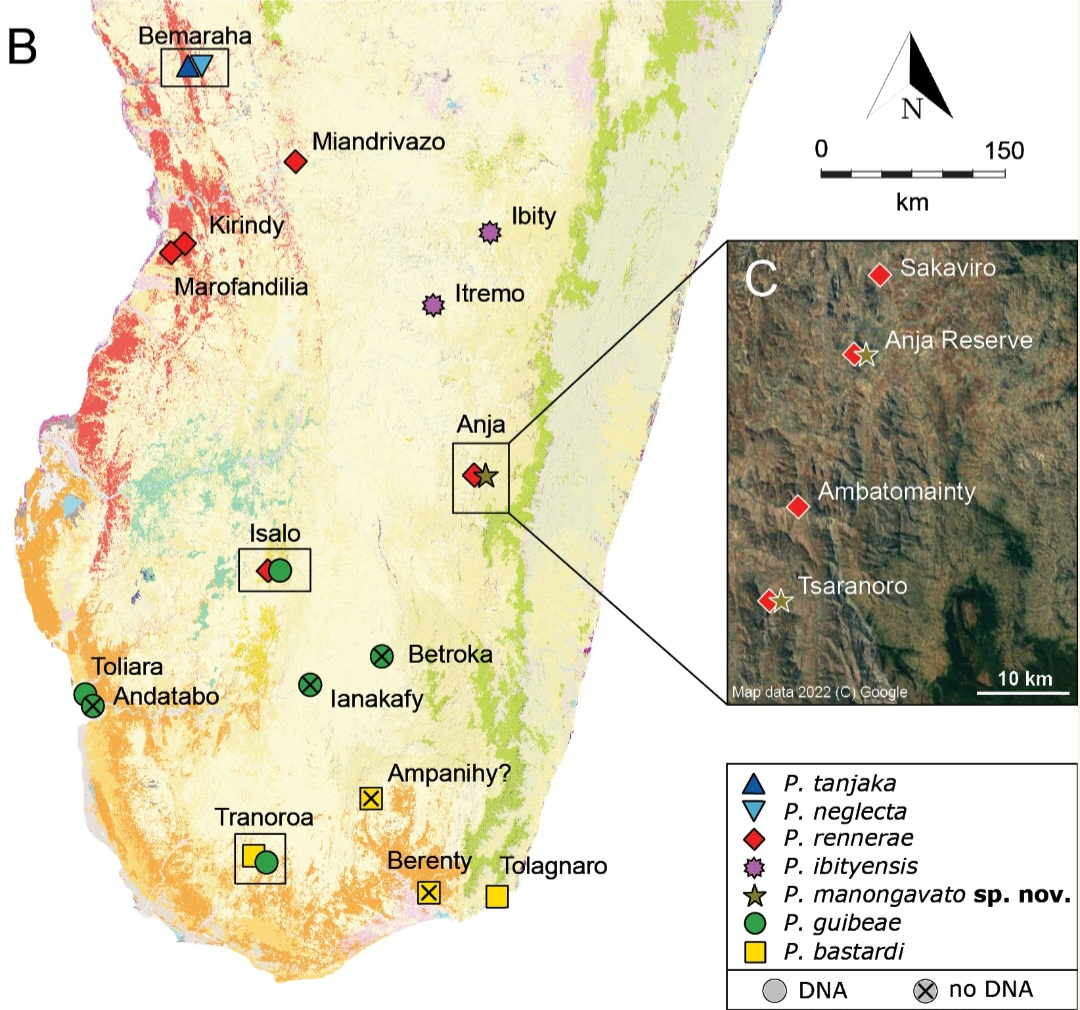
- Range of the species within the Paroedura bastardi clade, with P. neglecta indicated by the cyan triangle

Species of lizard

Paroedura neglecta is a species of lizard in the family Gekkonidae. It was first discovered in 2006, but the species was not named until 2019, hence the specific name meaning "neglected". It is endemic to Tsingy de Bemaraha National Park in northwestern Madagascar.

== Taxonomy ==
The holotype specimen of Paroedura neglecta is an adult male collected on 1 April 2006 from Andafiabe at the Beboka River, in the Melaky region of western Madagascar. Although the specimen was recognized as an unnamed species shortly after its discovery, it was not described until 13 years later in May 2019, thus it was given the specific name neglecta (Latin for "neglected").

Genetic analysis has found that Paroedura neglecta is a member of the Paroedura bastardi clade, and is a sister taxon to Paroedura tanjaka. The following cladogram shows the position of P. neglecta among its closest relatives according to Piccoli et al. (2023):

- - Paroedura picta (Outgroup)
  - - Paroedura bastardi
    - - - Paroedura guibeae
        - Paroedura manongavato
      - - Paroedura rennerae
        - - Paroedura ibityensis
          - - Paroedura neglecta
            - Paroedura tanjaka

== Distribution and habitat ==
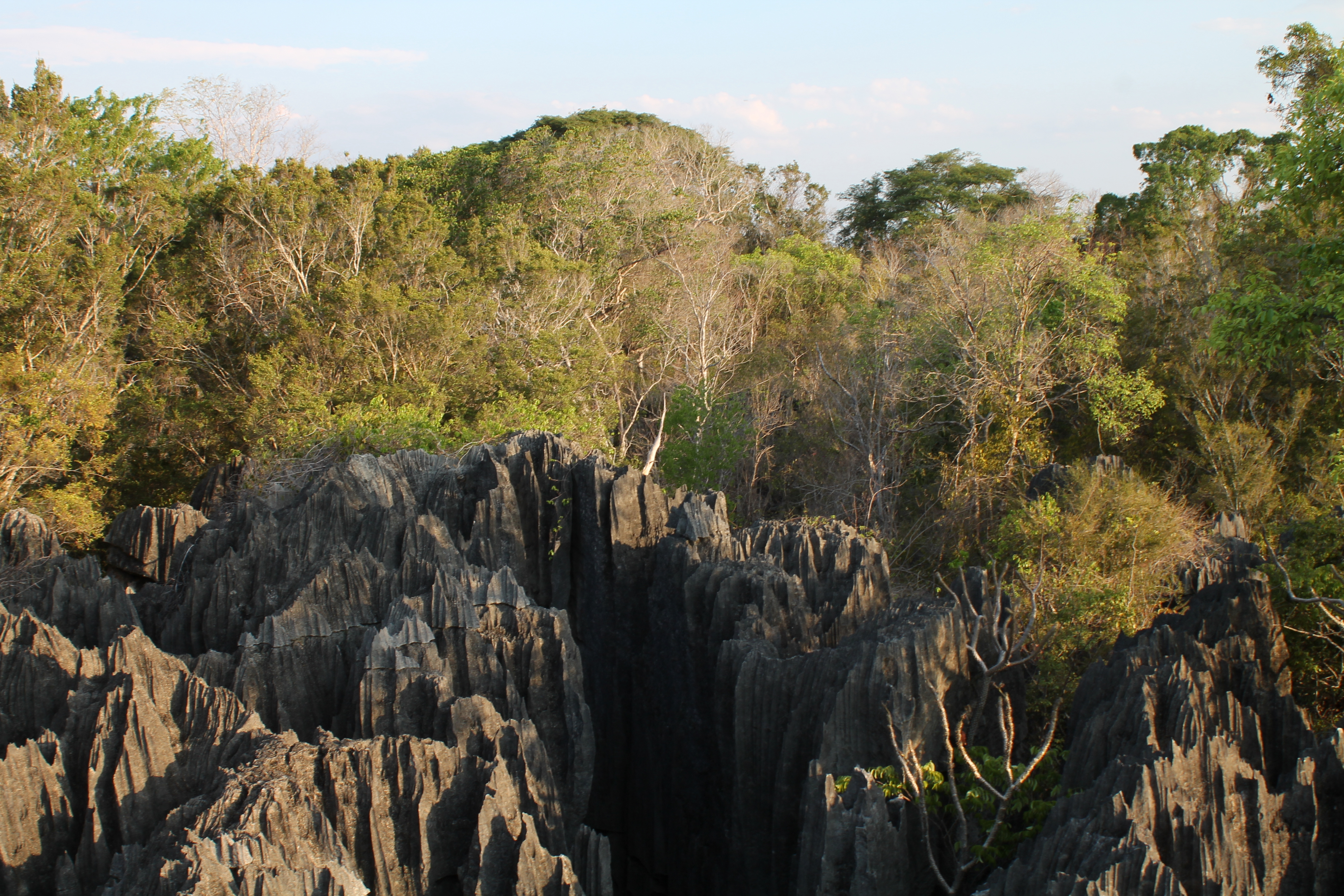
View of the karstic forest at Tsingy de Bemaraha National Park

This gecko is currently known from only two localities, both within Tsingy de Bemaraha National Park in northwestern Madagascar, and the species may be widespread within the park. It is believed to be endemic to this area as it has not been observed outside of it, and numerous other reptile species in the park are also endemic to it. These two localities are approximately 12 kilometers apart from each other, and both represent karstic dry forests. Three individuals have been collected close to rivers, two of which were near the bed of the Beboka River. Several congeneric species are sympatric with Paroedura neglecta, including P. homalorhina, P. tanjaka, P. karstophila, P. spelaea and P. stumpffi.

== Description ==
All collected specimens of Paroedura neglecta were found at night, indicating this species is mostly or entirely nocturnal. The holotype individual has a snout–vent length of 61.3 mm, with a triangular head measuring 20.8 mm long, 14.6 mm wide and 9.2 mm tall. The head is wider than the neck and body, with a vertical slit as the ear opening. The rostral scale is rectangular in shape, much wider than it is tall, and makes contact with the nostril.

Enlarged tuberculate scales are present on the dorsal surface and arranged in longitudinal rows. The dorsal scales of the front limbs are mostly flat, whereas those of the hind limbs are mainly keeled and tuberculate. Each digit is widened at the tip, with a downward-curving claw between the terminal pads. The tail similarly has primarily tuberculate scales.

The dorsal colors are mainly reddish-brown, with reticulated patterns on the head and regularly-spaced light crossbands on the torso. The iris is a golden color, with a reddish area surrounding the pupil and a vessel running down the posterior of the iris, visible as a red-brown stripe. Slightly marbled grey and beige patterns are present on the limbs. The underside of this lizard is whitish with a fine grey shade.

== Conservation ==
Due to limited available data, it has been recommended that Paroedura neglecta be listed as Data Deficient according to the IUCN guidelines. Both localities the species is known from have only had little anthropogenic disturbance, however nearby areas within Tsingy de Bemaraha National Park have been subject to severe cattle browsing and logging. Due to its restricted range, this lizard could become threatened by the impacts of farming, fire and logging which lead to habitat loss.
