= Paroedura masobe =

Conservation status
- Endangered (IUCN 3.1)
- CITES Appendix II

Scientific classification
- Kingdom: Animalia
- Phylum: Chordata
- Class: Reptilia
- Order: Squamata
- Suborder: Gekkota
- Family: Gekkonidae
- Genus: Paroedura
- Species: P. masobe

Binomial name
- Paroedura masobe Nussbaum & Raxworthy, 1994

Species of lizard

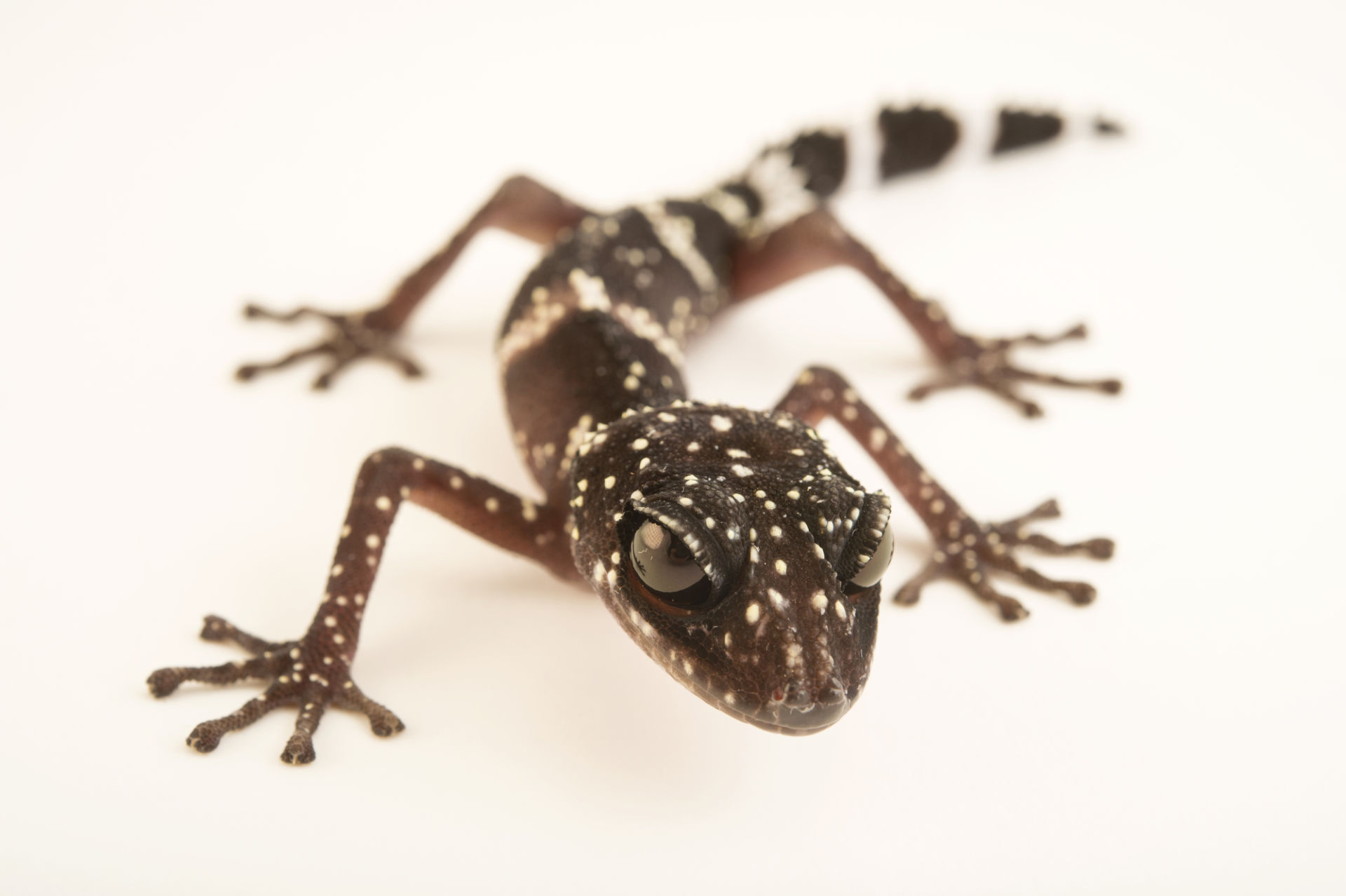

Paroedura masobe, also called masobe gecko, is an endangered species of gekkonid gecko. They are known for their white-speckled dark skin and big eyes. The average life span of the Paroedura masobe is approximately eight years. Paroedura masobe reaches lengths of up to 17 centimetres (6.69 in).

This rare species has been sought after for the herpetoculture pet trade. It was listed on CITES Appendix II in 2017, following a 2016 proposal.

== Classification and phylogenetic relationships ==
Paroedura masobe was described by Nussbaum and Raxworthy in 1994. A 2018 study placed it as the phylogenetic sister of a clade containing P. androyensis, P. maingoka, and P. picta from southern and southwestern Madagascar.

== Ecology ==
=== Habitat ===
Paroedura masobe inhabits low elevation humid primary forest. It is an arboreal species, active 1–4 m above the forest floor.

=== Distribution ===
This species is endemic to Madagascar, where it is known from low elevation sites in Zahamena National Park, in the north of the Zahamena-Ankeniheny Corridor, in Betaikankana in the south east of the Zahamena-Ankeniheny Corridor, and in Betampona Special Reserve, and . The range of occurrence is 410 km^{2} (160 sq mi). Due to the scarcity of a suitable habitat the distributional extent in this area is approximately below 100 km^{2} (39 sq mi). It occurs from 300 to 600 metres (980 to 1,970 ft) asl. They are very rare to encounter due to the pressure and rough distribution of the forest habitat within the range of the geckos. The species population is decreasing in result, it has a severely fragmented population.

=== Diet ===
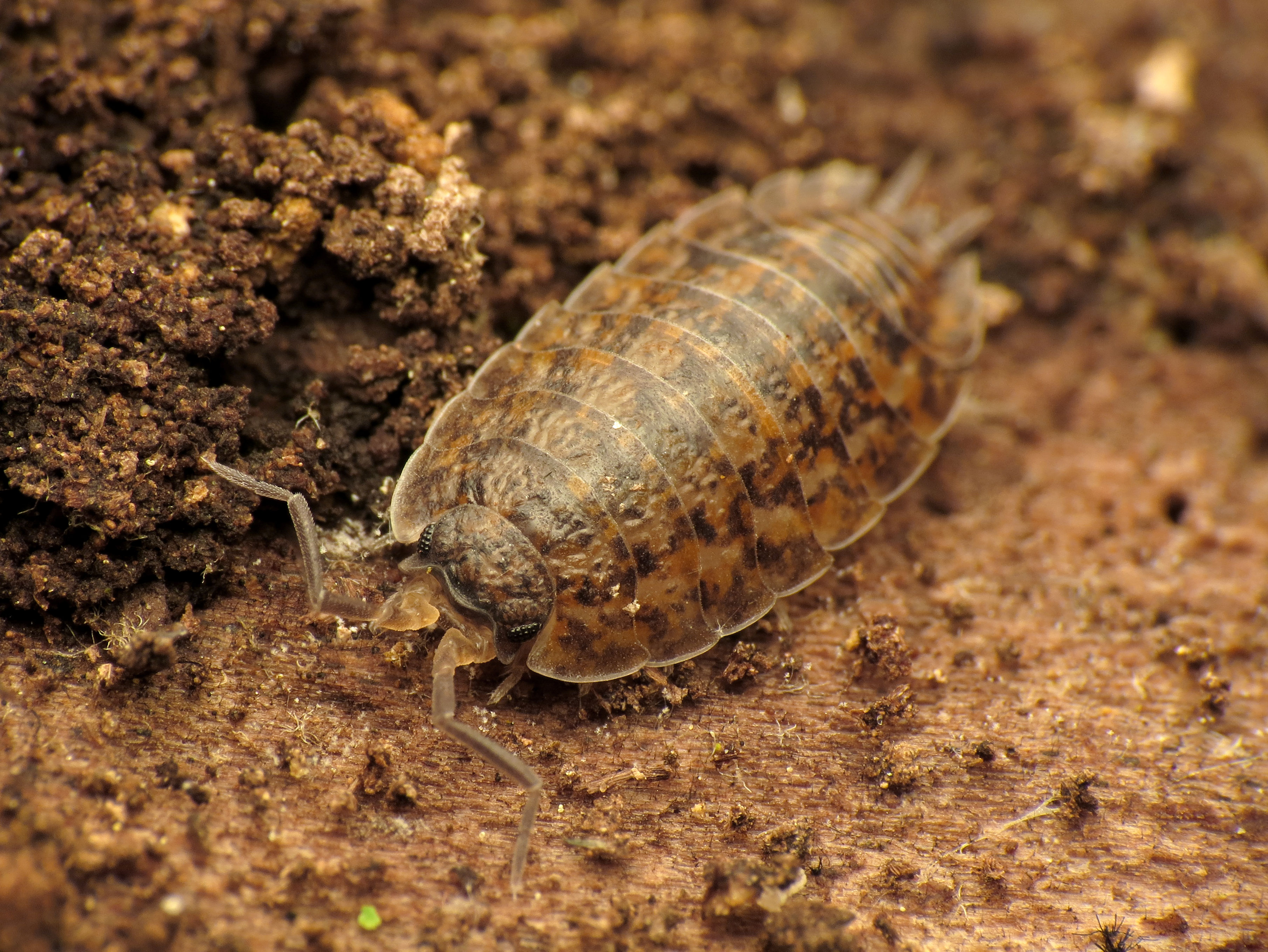
Isopods (Wood Lice)

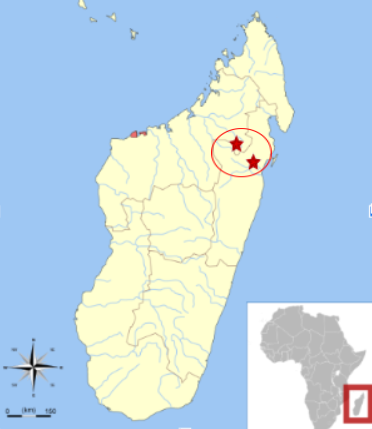
This is a map showing the range and distribution of the paroedura masobe in Madagascar

The diet of wild Paroedura masobe has not been studied. In captivity, they are frequently fed crickets, roaches, land snails, isopods (wood lice), roaches. Females benefit greatly from inclusion of snails and isopods in their diet because of the increase in calcium. Young masobes should be fed around four to five insects every day, while adult masobes should be fed four to six times per week. Females that are ready to breed should be fed isopods or land snails at least twice a month. During hunting, overly large animals or very small prey are often ignored.

=== Reproduction ===
Females lay pairs of hard shelled, roughly spherical eggs, measuring ca 18 x 17 mm. Eggs hatch after six months.

== Conservation ==
=== Threats ===
This species is threatened by low elevation humid forest into farmland and the removal of timber. The extraction of honey and other biological resources also degrades the forest which results in the species' ability to persevere. Between 2010 and 2015, 2–505 specimens per year were exported from Madagascar for the international pet trade. A 2015 moratorium on CITES trade brought exports to a halt. The current CITES export quota of live animals from Madagascar is zero.

=== Efforts ===
The current efforts to protect Paroedura masobe are limited. 100 percent of the known species distribution is protected by protected areas, but many habitats are fragmented. Currently, there is no monitoring of the species being conducted. There is no area based regional management plan. The physical efforts to save this species are almost non-existent. For example, there are no awareness programs. The conservation of this species demands more research to be conducted on the population trends of the Paroedura masobe.
