= Paroedura vahiny =

Conservation status
- Least Concern (IUCN 3.1)

Scientific classification
- Kingdom: Animalia
- Phylum: Chordata
- Class: Reptilia
- Order: Squamata
- Suborder: Gekkota
- Family: Gekkonidae
- Genus: Paroedura
- Species: P. vahiny

Binomial name
- Paroedura vahiny Nussbaum & Raxworthy, 2000
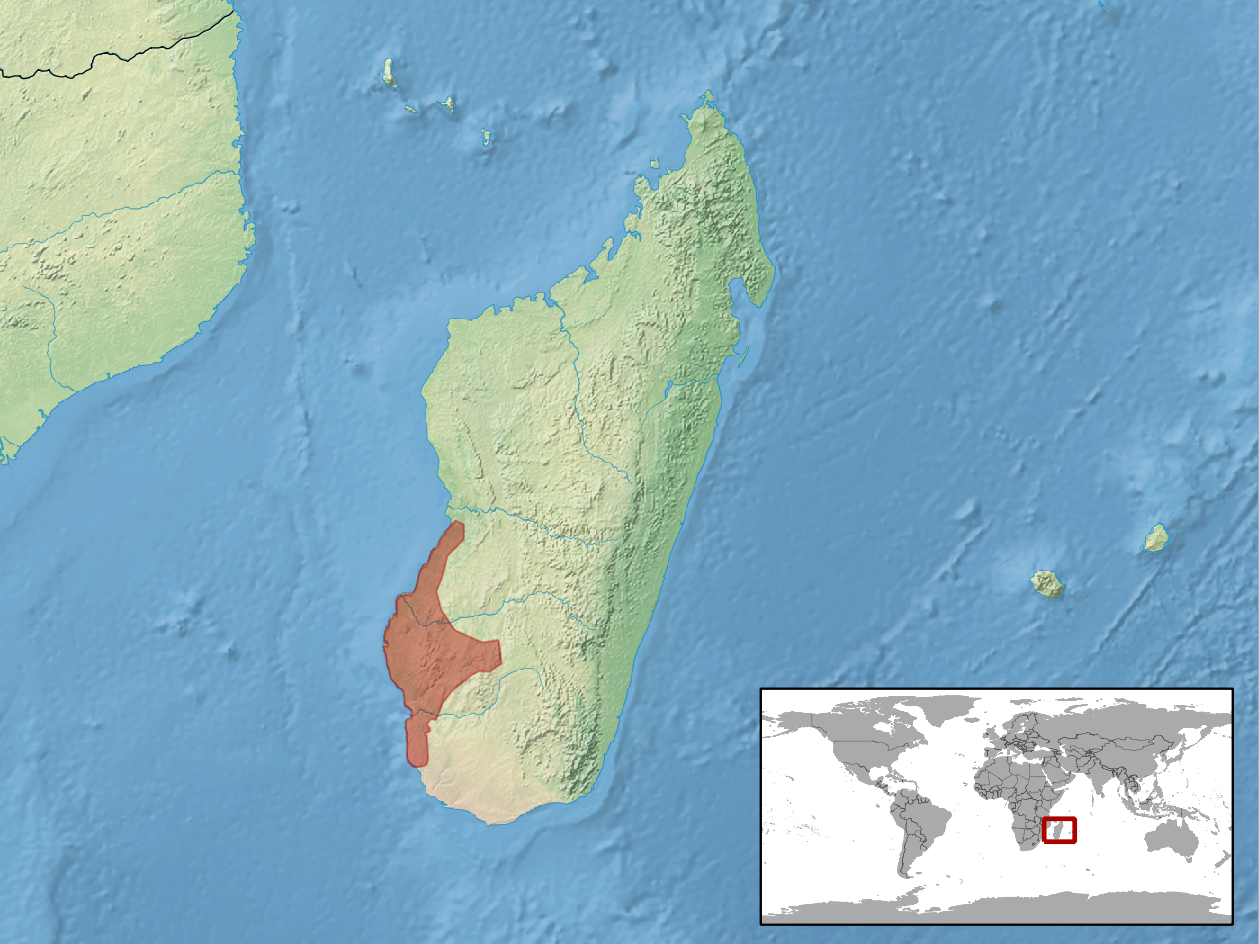
- Approximate distribution of Paroedura vahiny

Species of lizard

Paroedura vahiny is a species of lizard in the family Gekkonidae. This nocturnal species is terrestrial and can be found on the ground or climbing onto vegetation. It is endemic to southwest Madagascar, where it is found in deciduous dry forests.

The species was first described in 2000 from specimens collected in 1996, though an additional specimen collected in 1969 was later concluded to also represent this P. vahiny. It is a small reptile, measuring only 4.2 cm (1.7 in) in snout–vent length.

== Taxonomy ==
The species Paroedura vahiny was erected in 2000, with the holotype (UMMZ 224236) being an adult female found in Dabara Forest, Toliara Province on 27 January 1996. However, the species was first collected 27 years prior, as analysis has revealed that a specimen in the Paris Museum of Natural History collected on 23 January 1969 also represents P. vahiny. No paratypes are designated. The specific name is Malagasy for "newcomer" or "stranger".

== Distribution and habitat ==
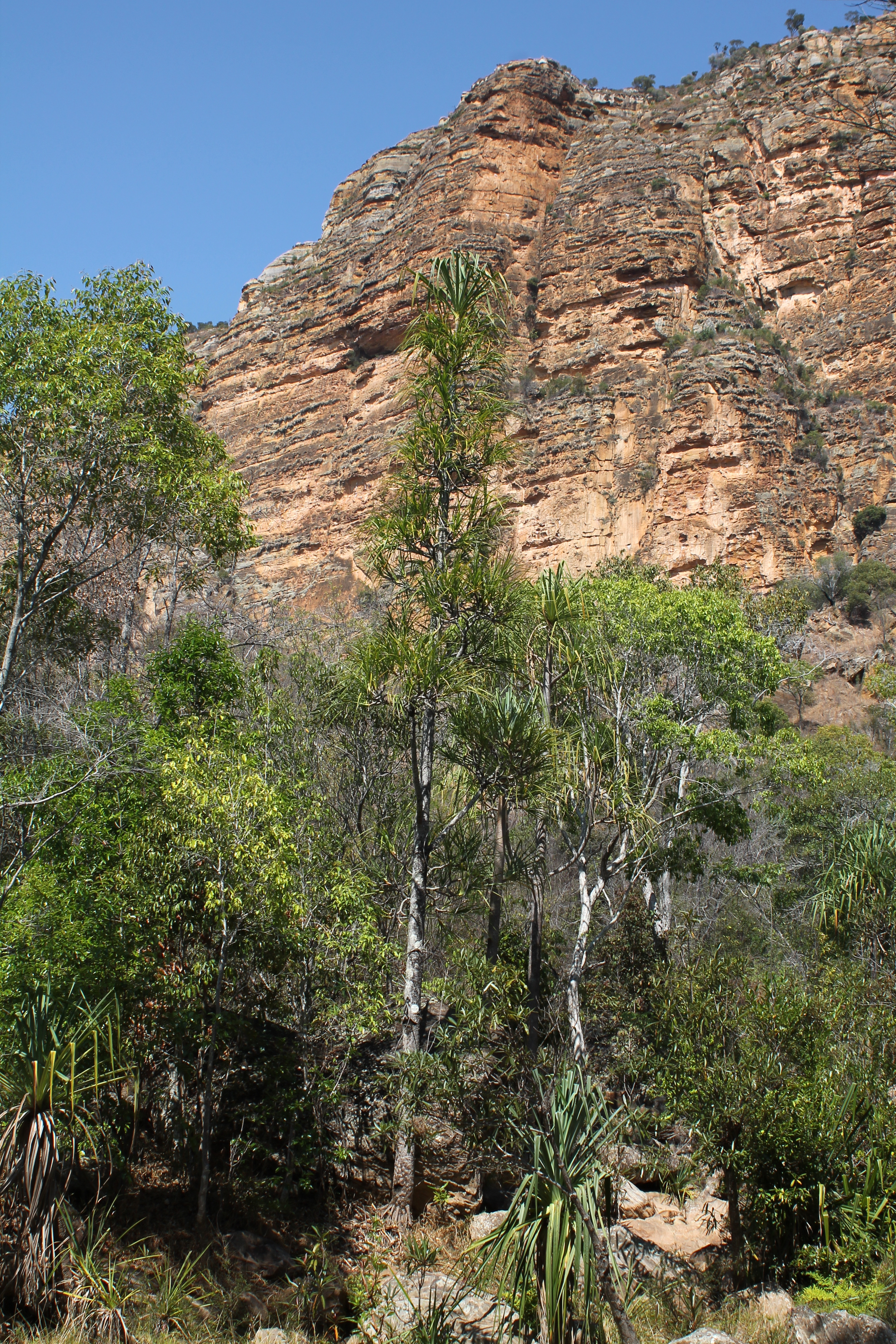
Dry forest in Isalo National Park

This species is endemic to Madagascar, and is found in deciduous dry forests in the south and southwest of the island nation. Known specimens were collected at night, indicating it is nocturnal, and it can be seen on the ground or climbing inches above the ground onto vegetation. This lizard has an estimated extent of occurrence of 42,726 km², and is present at elevations between 30 and 800 m. When it was initially described, it was known only from Dabara Forest and the nearby town of Manja in Toliara Province. Later surveys would discover it in other locations such as Kirindy, Mikea, Tsimanampetsotsa and Isalo.

== Description ==
Paroedura vahiny is a small species, with the holotype having a snout–vent length of 4.2 cm (1.7 in). The head is ovate in shape and dorsally flattened, wider than the neck but narrower than the torso. The nostril is separated from the rectangular rostral scale by prenasals. The snout is short and is sloped downwards. The canthal ridges are prominent, and the canthal bridge is flattened around the nostrils but concave near the eyes. The ear openings and the pupils are both vertical. The digits are short and almost cylindrical, ending with barely expanded toe pads and small claws. Uniquely among its genus, P. vahiny has multicarinate (multi-keeled) scales on its underside. The only congeneric species with multicarinate scales, Grandidier's Madagascar ground gecko, does not have them on the underside. The body is mildly depressed and has a generally smooth appearance, with small tuberculate scales scattered across the dorsal surface.

The dorsolateral surfaces of this lizard are dark brown, with three faint M- or W-shaped crossbands on the body (the band in front of the hindlimbs is most prominent). The tail is dark with light crossbands. The underside of the jaw, chin and throat have reticulated brown patterns over a light background color, while the ventral surfaces of the torso and limbs are "dirty white" (white with many tiny brown spots).

== Threats ==
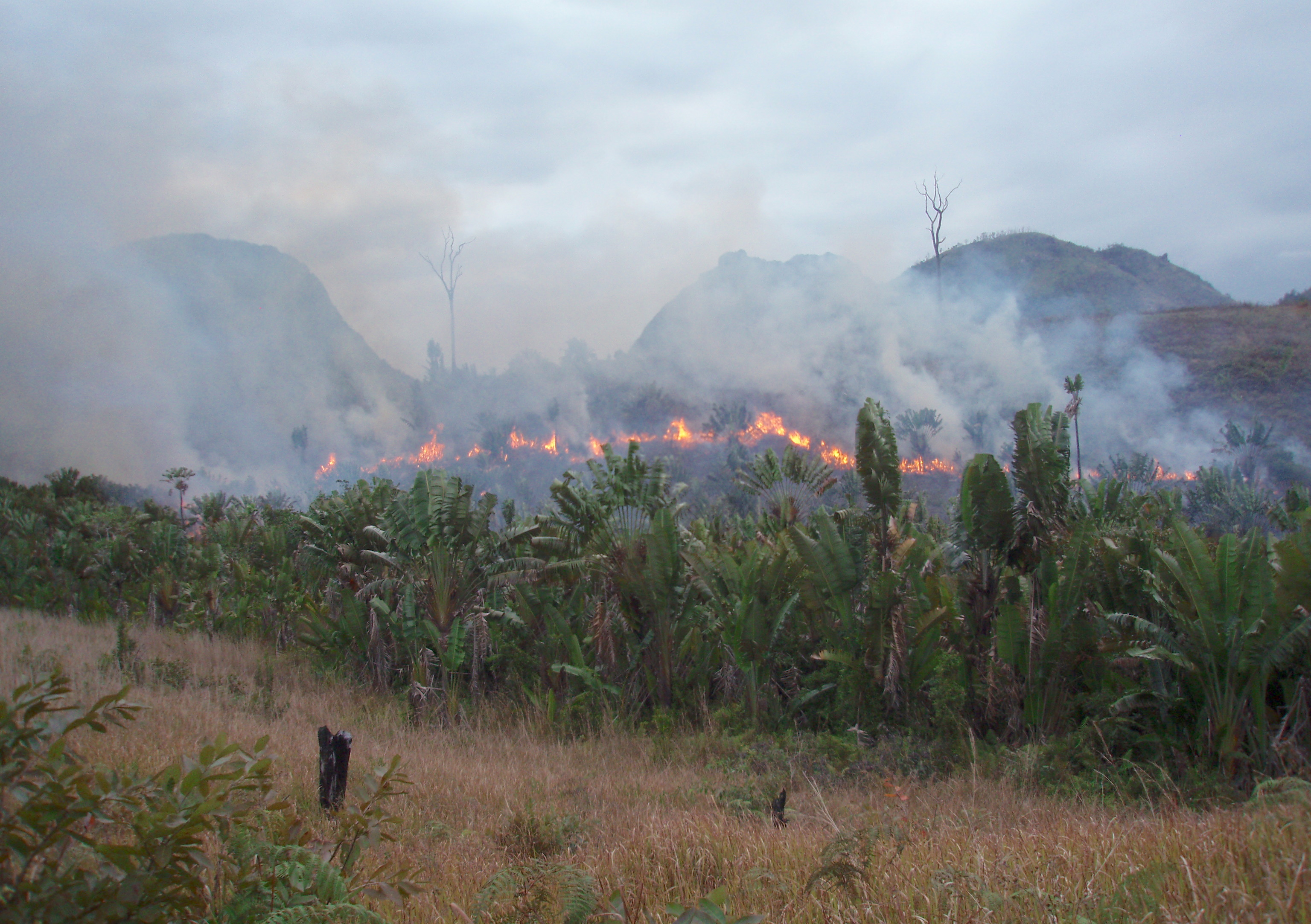
Illegal slash-and-burn practice in Madagascar.

Due to the extent of its range and that its population is unlikely to be declining very rapidly, Paroedura vahiny was assessed as Least Concern by the IUCN Red List in 2010. However, it was noted that more research is needed to determine the rate of its decline and that it may need to be reassessed. The dry forests this lizard relies on are threatened by logging, burning and farming, so the population may be severely fragmented.
