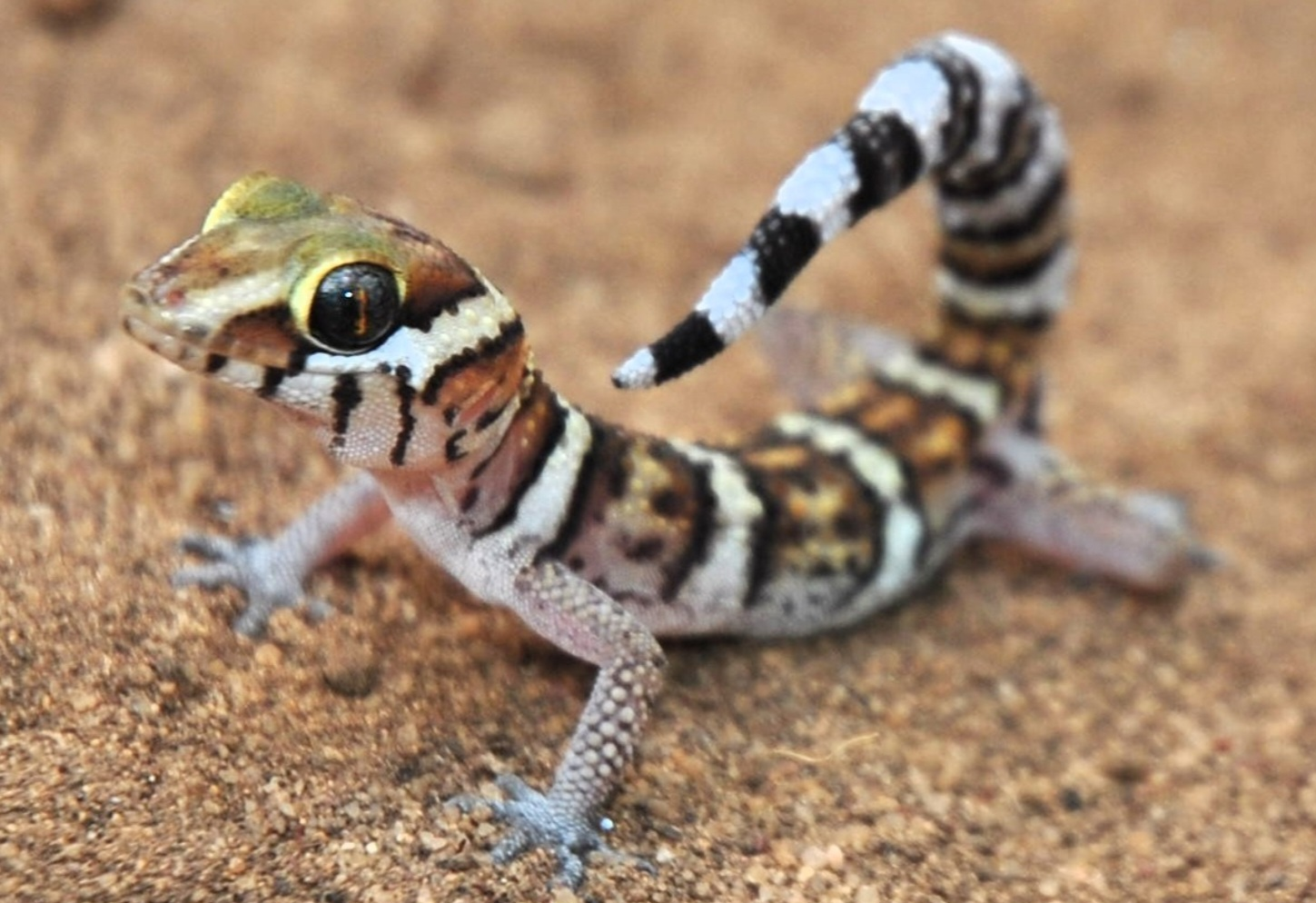
- In Tsimanampetsotsa National Park, Madagascar

Conservation status
- Near Threatened (IUCN 3.1)

Scientific classification
- Kingdom: Animalia
- Phylum: Chordata
- Class: Reptilia
- Order: Squamata
- Suborder: Gekkota
- Family: Gekkonidae
- Genus: Paroedura
- Species: P. maingoka

Binomial name
- Paroedura maingoka Nussbaum & Raxworthy, 2000
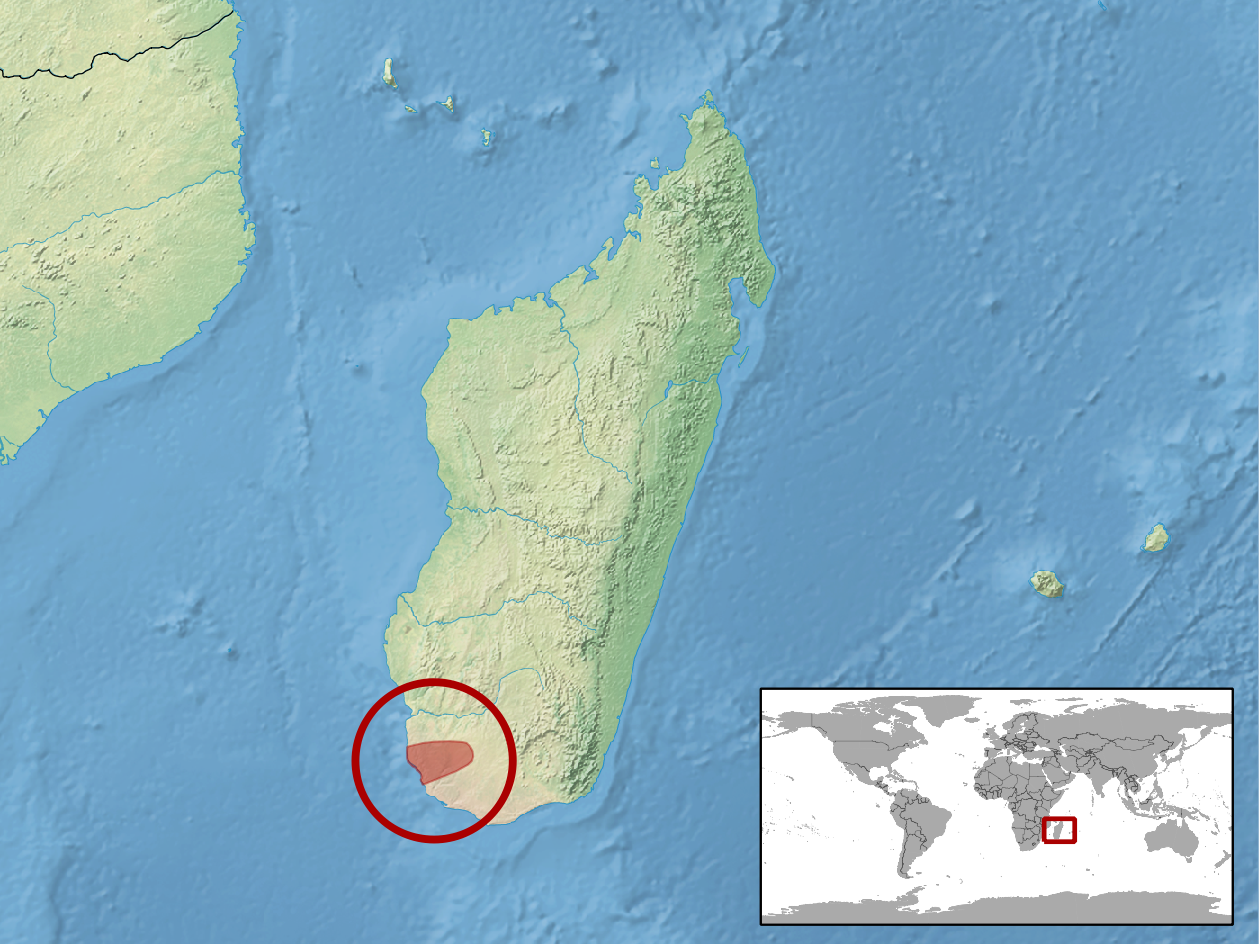
- Approximate distribution of Paroedura maingoka

= Paroedura maingoka =

Species of lizard

Paroedura maingoka, the scorpion leaf-toed gecko, is a species of lizard in the family Gekkonidae. It is endemic to southwest Madagascar, where it occurs on rock outcrops in dry forests and scrubland. It is a nocturnal species, emerging to feed at night.

This lizard is known for its defensive behavior in which it curls its tail over its back. It is named after this posture, which resembles that of a scorpion ('Batesian mimicry'). The specific name maingoka is Malagasy for "scorpion".

== Taxonomy ==
The species Paroedura maingoka was described in 2000, with the holotype (UMMZ 211210) being an adult male found on 10 December 1995 in Tsimanampetsotsa National Park. Several other specimens from the same locality were included as paratypes. The specific name is a Malagasy word meaning "scorpion", referencing the lizard's defensive posture in which the tail is curved over the back.

== Distribution and habitat ==
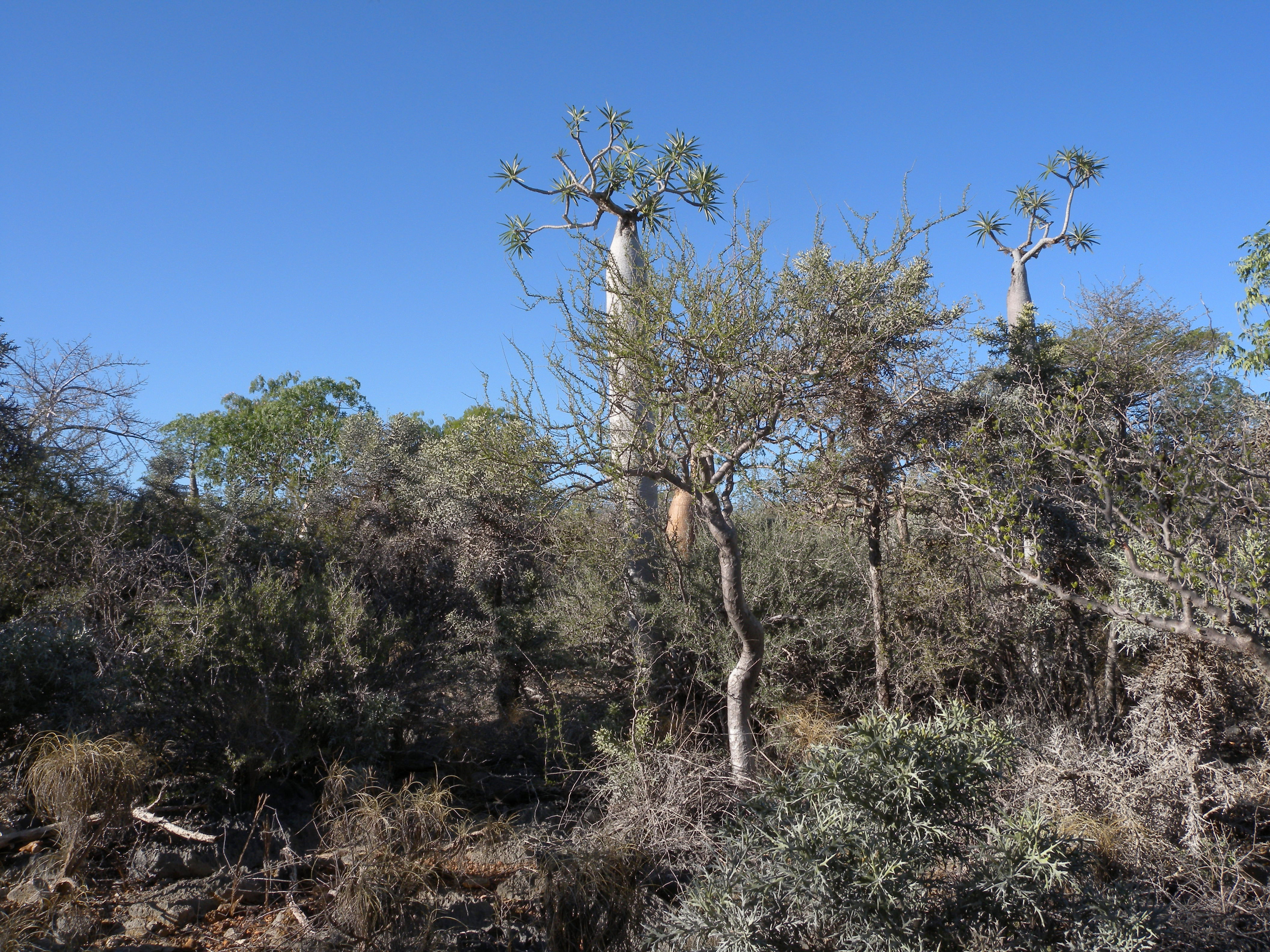
View of the dry forest in Tsimanampetsotsa

This gecko is one of many species endemic to the island of Madagascar, and is recorded from several areas in the extreme southwest of the country. This species is found on rock outcrops in dry forests with xeric vegetation, dominated by baobabs and similar trees. Initially it was known only from Itampolo and the type locality of Tsimanampetsotsa, but was already theorized to occur across most of the Mahafaly Plateau. Later, it was also recorded from Vohombe and Efoetsy. It is a lowland species, with all these localities between 20 and 160 meters (66 and 525 ft) in elevation, and it has a known extent of occurrence of 7,564 km^{2} (2,920 sq mi). Because this species is readily observable and prone to habitat degradation, it may serve as an indicator of suitable locations for reptile conservation.

== Description ==
This is a moderately-sized species, with mature individuals having a snout–vent length of 47 to 71 mm (1.9 to 2.8 in), while the tail measures approximately 50 mm (2.0 in). The head is wider than the neck, comparable to the torso in width, with a short and steep snout. The canthal ridges are prominent, with a slight depression in between, and the ear opening is a vertical slit. The rectangular rostral scale is wider than it is tall, and makes no contact with the nostrils. Enlarged tuberculate scales are arranged in longitudinal rows on the dorsal surface, with smaller tubercles and flat scales separating them. The ventral scales are flat, with those on the limbs slightly larger than on the belly. Each digit ends with a widened toe pad and a downward-curving claw.

The upper side is primarily tannish brown, with a distinct white stripe running down the spine interrupted by dark crosslines. White crossbands with dark borders are present on the torso, while the tail has alternating black and white bands. An additional white crossband is located on the back of the head, and a short white stripe extends from each eye to the lip. The upper surfaces of the limbs are dark brown with white tubercles. The underside is mostly light.

Patterning is variable within the species, with the crossbands being more distinct in some individuals while in others they are almost totally obscured, and tails which have been regenerated may have a variegated instead of banded pattern. Smaller individuals have been noted to be brighter colored and show greater contrast between the dark and light areas of the body (particularly in the crossbands), a phenomenon also observed in juvenile ocelot geckos and Mocquard's Madagascar ground geckos. This lizard can be distinguished from related species by its distinct coloration and patterning, the separation of the nostril from the rostral scale, and the presence of smaller scales between large tubercles.

== Biology ==
Paroedura maingoka is a nocturnal species, emerging to feed on insects at night. It is a terrestrial animal, found crawling on the ground among rocks or boulders in its scrub habitat.

This gecko is best known for its defensive behavior, for which it is named. When threatened, the lizard will curl its tail forwards over its back, taking a posture resembling that of a scorpion. This behavior is also known in other lizards such as Teratoscincus roborowskii, and has been theorized to be Batesian mimicry of scorpions. In P. maingoka, it has also been proposed that in association with its banded coloring, this posture attracts the attention of predators towards the tail. The tail is the most expendable part of this species' body and can be autotomized, which is known from the fact that some collected specimens have regenerated tails. Various scorpion species are known occur in the same areas as this gecko, though none have similar banded patterning.

== Conservation ==
This species was listed as Near Threatened by the IUCN Red List in 2010, on the basis that it is locally abundant and the population shows no sign of decline. However, it was also noted that this gecko has a limited extent of occurrence and further degradation of its habitat may threaten the species, requiring it to be listed in a more threatened category. Habitat loss from deforestation has been identified as the main threat to this species, and it is known have a low degree of tolerance towards habitat degradation.
