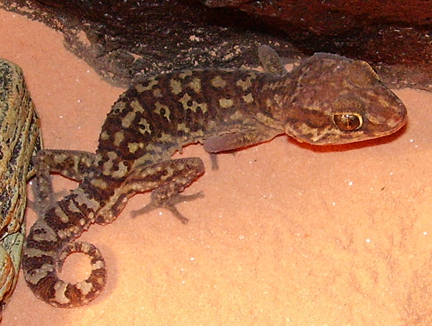
- Ocelot gecko (Paroedura picta)

Scientific classification
- Kingdom: Animalia
- Phylum: Chordata
- Class: Reptilia
- Order: Squamata
- Suborder: Gekkota
- Family: Gekkonidae
- Subfamily: Uroplatinae
- Genus: Paroedura; Günther, 1879

Species
- 24, see text.

= Paroedura =

Genus of lizards

Paroedura (Madagascar ground geckos) is a genus of geckos, endemic to Madagascar and the Comoros. These geckos are typically terrestrial, though the young of most species can climb until they are too heavy for their feet to support.

== Species ==
The following 25 species are recognized as being valid.

- Paroedura androyensis (Grandidier, 1867) – Grandidier's Madagascar ground gecko
- Paroedura bastardi (Mocquard, 1900) – Mocquard's Madagascar ground gecko
- Paroedura fasciata Glaw, J. Köhler & Vences, 2018
- Paroedura gracilis (Boulenger, 1896) – graceful Madagascar ground gecko
- Paroedura guibeae Dixon & Kroll, 1974 – Guibé's ground gecko
- Paroedura homalorhina (Angel, 1936) – northern Madagascar ground gecko
- Paroedura hordiesi Glaw, Rösler, Ineich, Gehring, J. Köhler & Vences, 2014 – Hordies's ground gecko
- Paroedura ibityensis Rösler & Krüger, 1998 – Ibity ground gecko
- Paroedura karstophila Nussbaum & Raxworthy, 2000
- Paroedura kloki Glaw, J. Köhler & Vences, 2018
- Paroedura lohatsara Glaw, Vences & K. Schmidt, 2001
- Paroedura maingoka Nussbaum & Raxworthy, 2000
- Paroedura manongavato Piccoli, Belluardo, Lobón-Rovira, Alves, Rasoazanany, Andreone, Rosa & Crottini, 2023
- Paroedura masobe Nussbaum & Raxworthy, 1994
- Paroedura neglecta J. Köhler, Vences, Scherz & Glaw, 2019
- Paroedura oviceps (Boettger, 1881) – Nosy Be ground gecko
- Paroedura picta (W. Peters, 1854) – ocelot gecko
- Paroedura rennerae Miralles, Bruy, Crottini, Rakotoarison, Ratsoavina, Scherz, R. Schmidt, J. Köhler, Glaw & Vences, 2021
- Paroedura sanctijohannis Günther, 1879 – Comoro ground gecko
- Paroedura spelaea Glaw, J. Köhler & Vences, 2018
- Paroedura stellata Hawlitschek & Glaw, 2012
- Paroedura stumpffi (Boettger, 1879)
- Paroedura tanjaka Nussbaum & Raxworthy, 2000
- Paroedura vahiny Nussbaum & Raxworthy, 2000
- Paroedura vazimba Nussbaum & Raxworthy, 2000

Nota bene: A binomial authority in parentheses indicates that the species was originally described in a genus other than Paroedura.
