= Paroedura stumpffi =

Conservation status
- Least Concern (IUCN 3.1)

Scientific classification
- Kingdom: Animalia
- Phylum: Chordata
- Class: Reptilia
- Order: Squamata
- Suborder: Gekkota
- Family: Gekkonidae
- Genus: Paroedura
- Species: P. stumpffi

Binomial name
- Paroedura stumpffi (Boettger, 1879)

Synonyms
- Phyllodactylus stumpffi Boettger, 1879; Paroedura stumpffi — Kluge, 1993

Species of lizard

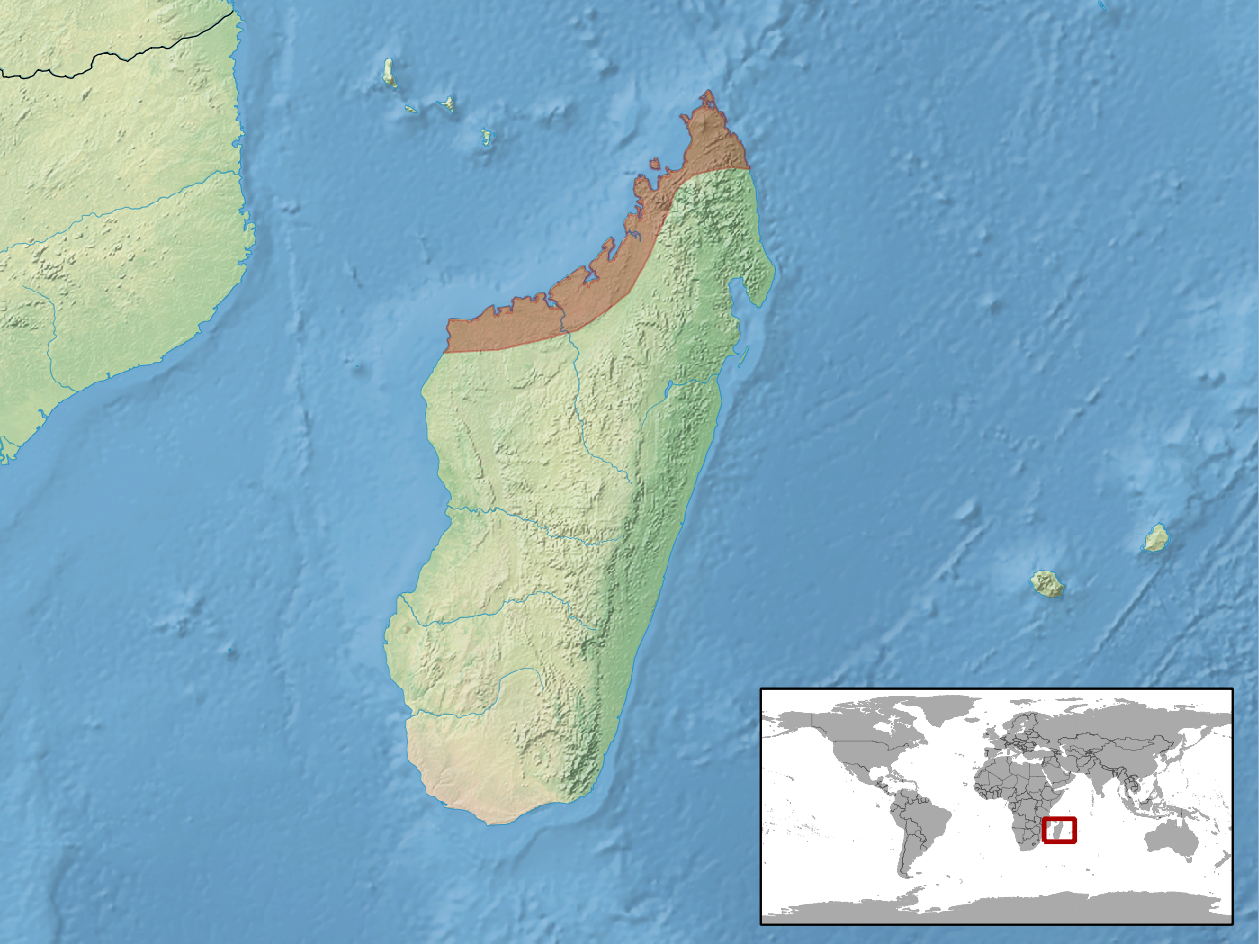
geographic distribution of Paroedura stumpffi

Paroedura stumpffi is a species of lizard in the family Gekkonidae. The species is endemic to Madagascar.

== Etymology ==
The specific name, stumpffi, is in honor of Anton Stumpff who collected the holotype.

== Geographic range ==
P. stumpffi is found in northern Madagascar, including associated islands Nosy Be, Nosy Komba, and Nosy Mitsio.

== Habitat ==
The preferred natural habitat of P. stumpffi is forest, at altitudes of 40–199 m (131–653 ft).

== Reproduction ==
P. stumpffi is oviparous.
