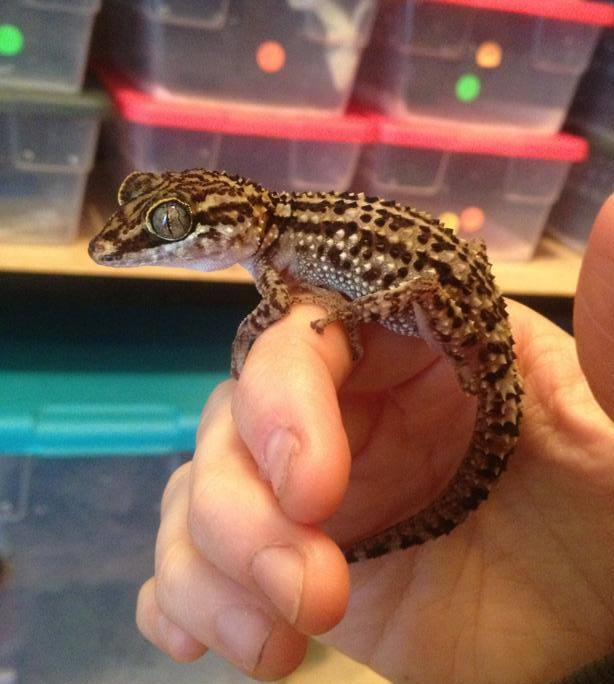

Conservation status
- Critically Endangered (IUCN 3.1)

Scientific classification
- Kingdom: Animalia
- Phylum: Chordata
- Class: Reptilia
- Order: Squamata
- Suborder: Gekkota
- Family: Gekkonidae
- Genus: Paroedura
- Species: P. lohatsara

Binomial name
- Paroedura lohatsara Glaw, Vences & Schmidt, 2001

= Paroedura lohatsara =

Species of lizard

Paroedura lohatsara is a species of small-to-medium-sized geckos native to northern Madagascar where it is found on a single mountain range. These geckos are up to 6 cm (2.4 in) long and are brown with black speckling, the speckles sometimes combining into longitudinal bands. Juveniles have wide transverse bands of black and transition into the adult colouring as they grow. This gecko is mainly nocturnal and is found on the ground, on boulders and in the lowest branches of trees. Because of its limited range and the ongoing destruction of its forest habitat, this species is listed as critically endangered on the IUCN Red List. It is not currently protected under CITES. Some individuals are kept in captivity in the United States and may act as a genetic resource if the gecko becomes extinct in the wild.

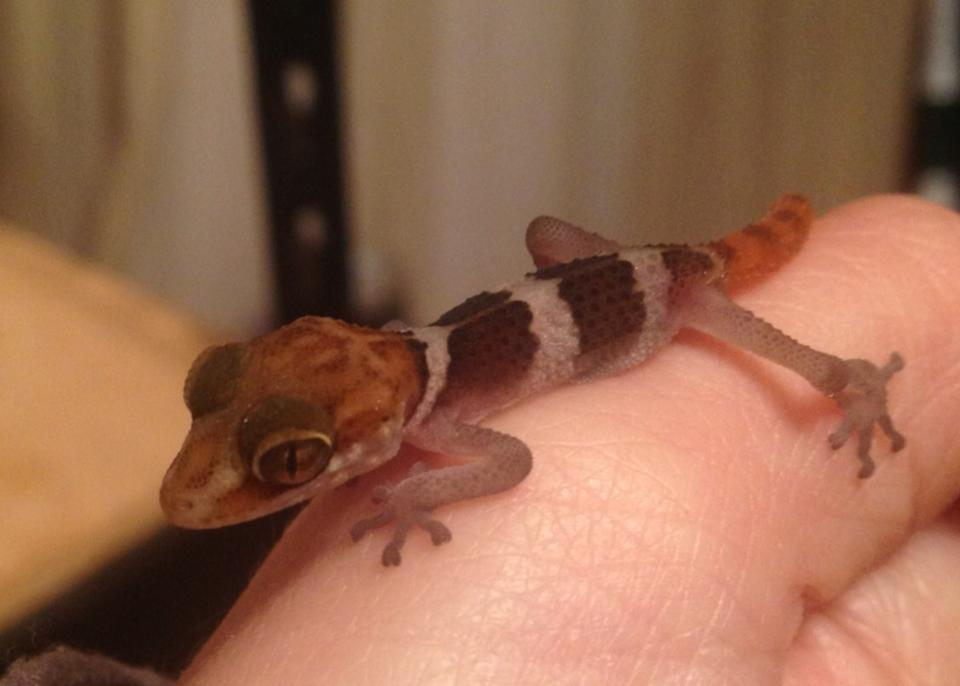
Juvenile P. lohatsara

== Description ==
P. lohatsara grow into their colors; as juveniles, they have brownish heads, black and white bands down their bodies, and a striped, orangey tail. As they mature, their coloration changes - the bands break up along their bodies, turning them into animals with a primarily light (yellowish) base color and black spotting. Oftentimes, the spotting will retain some semblance of striping, though it may tend to shift towards more lengthwise patterning. Adults of this species generally reach an approximate length of five to six inches.

While they are labeled as primarily terrestrial animals, they have been observed in the wild on boulders and branches up to two meters off the ground. The pads of their toes allow them to adhere and climb to the sides of their terrariums in captivity, particularly as youngsters, though as their size and weight increases with age they seem to prefer foliage and other available areas for climbing. Both adults and juveniles are active at night, and this species is considered to be nocturnal.

Sexual maturity is reached at approximately one year of age; males display a hemipenal bulge near their vent, whereas females lack hemipenes and as such this bulge is absent.

== Distribution ==
This species is native to northern Madagascar, where it has been observed in Montagne des Français between the elevations of 140 and 320 m asl. It is found in old growth forest and does not seem to adapt to forest degradation.

== Conservation ==
This species is currently listed on the IUCN Red List as critically endangered. It is not currently a protected species under CITES, and is found in a reserve that is threatened significantly by human encroachment upon its natural habitat in the form of deforestation, primarily for logging. In the US, there are a few known herpetologists who are working toward helping these animals reproduce in captivity to assist in creating a buffer zone between this animal's current population and their potential extinction.

== In captivity ==
A 10-gallon tank can be used to house a single individual, or pair during the breeding season. The temperatures in the terrarium should be 85–90 °F (29–32 °C) on the hot spot and 70–75 °F (21–24 °C) on the cool side. Heavy misting in the morning and afternoon is appropriate for proper hydration. An average humidity peak of 80-90% when misting with a mid-day low of 45-50% works well. Substrate can consist of peatmoss mix with potting soil or sand. Several cork pieces should be made available as these geckos are quite shy. Females lay eggs two at a time and these can be hatched at 80F and 80% humidity. Eggs hatch between 90 and 100 days.
