= Nosy Be ground gecko =

Conservation status
- Near Threatened (IUCN 3.1)

Scientific classification
- Kingdom: Animalia
- Phylum: Chordata
- Class: Reptilia
- Order: Squamata
- Suborder: Gekkota
- Family: Gekkonidae
- Genus: Paroedura
- Species: P. oviceps

Binomial name
- Paroedura oviceps (Boettger, 1881)

Synonyms
- Phyllodactylus oviceps; Phyllodactylus madagascariensis; Diplodactylus robustus

Species of lizard

The Nosy Be ground gecko (Paroedura oviceps) is a species of lizard in the family Gekkonidae. It is endemic to Madagascar.
