= Comoro ground gecko =

Conservation status
- Vulnerable (IUCN 3.1)

Scientific classification
- Kingdom: Animalia
- Phylum: Chordata
- Class: Reptilia
- Order: Squamata
- Suborder: Gekkota
- Family: Gekkonidae
- Genus: Paroedura
- Species: P. sanctijohannis

Binomial name
- Paroedura sanctijohannis Günther, 1879

Synonyms
- Paroedura sancti johannis Günther, 1879; Phyllodactylus sancti-johannis — Boulenger, 1885; Phyllodactylus sanctijohannis — Wermuth, 1965; Paroedura sanctijohannis — Kluge, 1993

Species of lizard

The Comoro ground gecko (Paroedura sanctijohannis) is a species of lizard in the family Gekkonidae. The species is endemic to the Comoros.

== Etymology ==
The specific name, sanctijohannis, refers to the island formerly called Johanna, now called Anjouan.

== Habitat ==
The preferred natural habitat of P. sanctijohannis is forest, at altitudes of 7–1,042 m (23–3,419 ft).

== Reproduction ==
P. sanctijohannis is oviparous.
