= Antanandranto =

- Town
- Location in Madagascar
- Coordinates: 24°18′56″S 43°43′18″E
- Country: Madagascar
- Region: Atsimo-Andrefana
- District: Betioky Sud

Antanandranto, also Ankilibory, is a small town in southwest Madagascar. It lies southwest of the Lake Tsimanampetsotsa. It lies north of the villages of Anja-Belitsaka and Vohombe.
