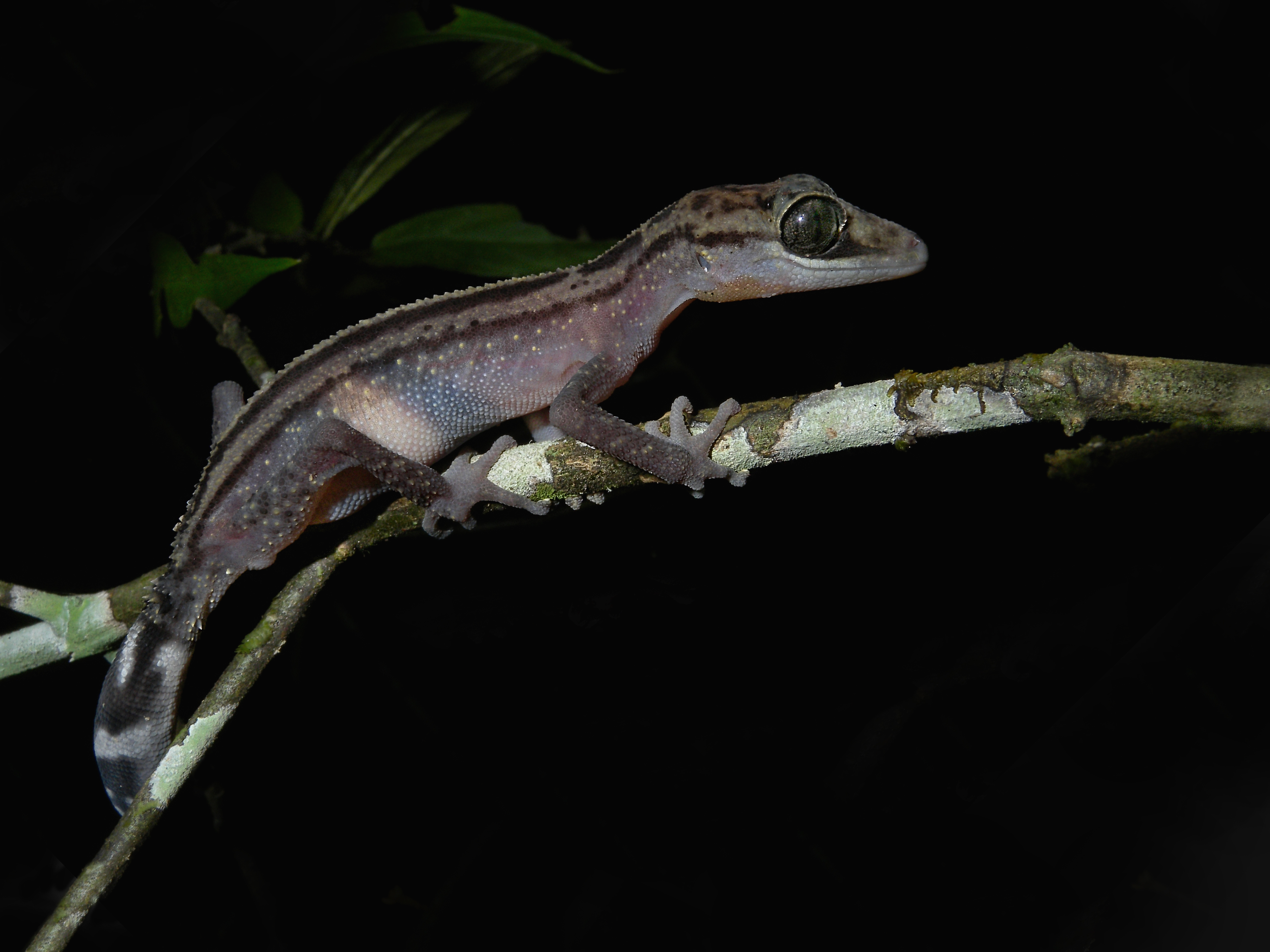

Conservation status
- Least Concern (IUCN 3.1)

Scientific classification
- Kingdom: Animalia
- Phylum: Chordata
- Class: Reptilia
- Order: Squamata
- Suborder: Gekkota
- Family: Gekkonidae
- Genus: Paroedura
- Species: P. gracilis

Binomial name
- Paroedura gracilis (Boulenger, 1896)

Synonyms
- Phyllodactylus gracilis; Diplodactylus gracilis

= Graceful Madagascar ground gecko =

Species of lizard

The graceful Madagascar ground gecko (Paroedura gracilis) is a species of lizard in the family Gekkonidae. It is endemic to Madagascar.
