= Paroedura fasciata =

Scientific classification
- Kingdom: Animalia
- Phylum: Chordata
- Class: Reptilia
- Order: Squamata
- Suborder: Gekkota
- Family: Gekkonidae
- Genus: Paroedura
- Species: P. fasciata

Binomial name
- Paroedura fasciata Glaw, Kohler, & Vences, 2018

Species of lizard

Paroedura fasciata is a species of lizard in the family Gekkonidae. It is endemic to Madagascar.
