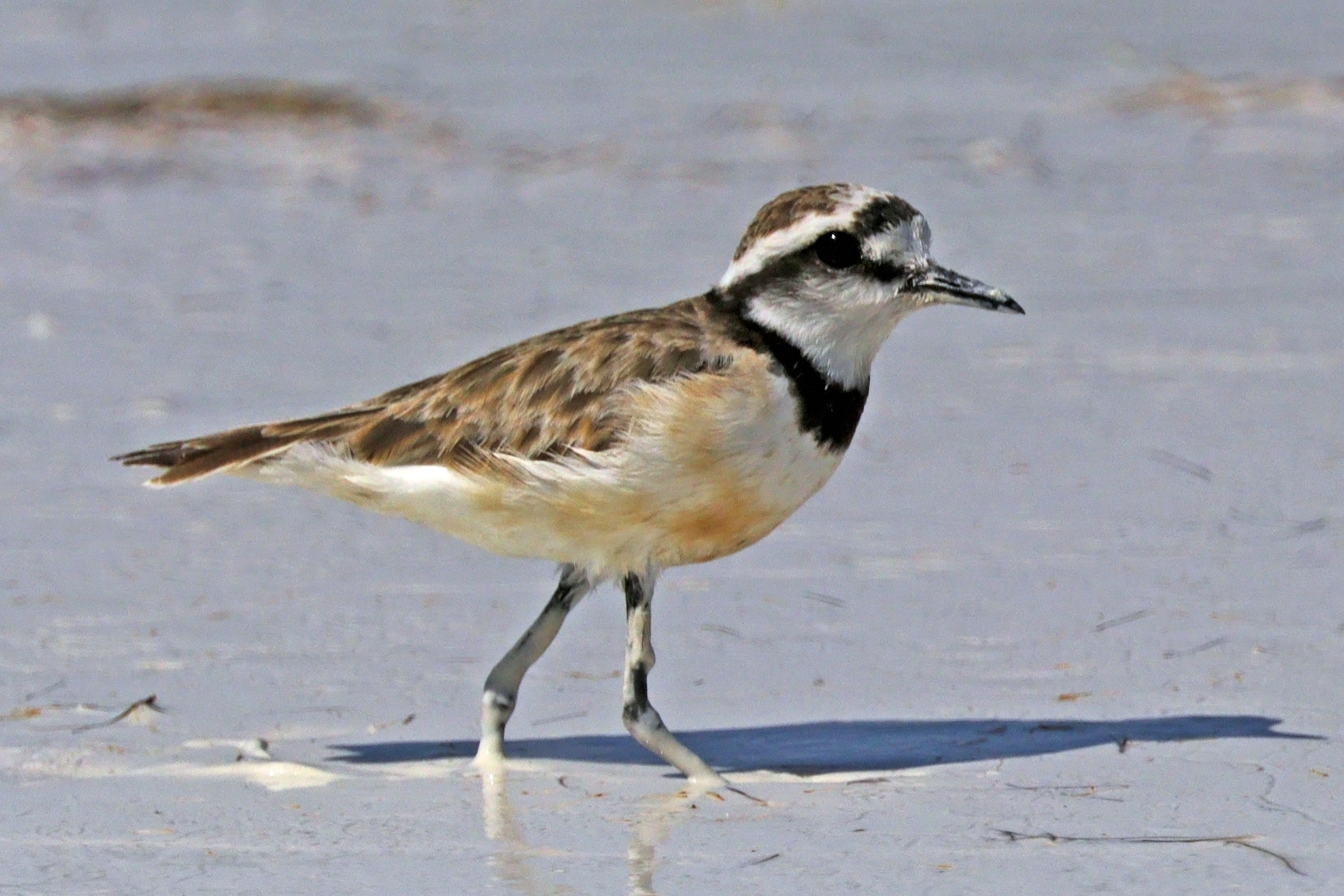
- Adult at Tsimanampetsotsa National Park

Conservation status
- Vulnerable (IUCN 3.1)

Scientific classification
- Kingdom: Animalia
- Phylum: Chordata
- Class: Aves
- Order: Charadriiformes
- Family: Charadriidae
- Genus: Anarhynchus
- Species: A. thoracicus

Binomial name
- Anarhynchus thoracicus (Richmond, 1896)

Synonyms
- Charadrius thoracicus

= Madagascar plover =

Species of bird

The Madagascar plover (Anarhynchus thoracicus), also known as the black-banded plover, is a small (37 g) monogamous shorebird in the family Charadriidae, native to western Madagascar. It inhabits shores of lagoons, coastal grasslands, and breeds in salt marshes. These plovers mainly nest in open grassland and dry mudflats surrounding alkaline lakes. The species is classified as vulnerable by the IUCN because of its low breeding success, slow reproductive rate, and weak adaptation to increasing habitat loss, leading to declining population numbers.

== Description ==
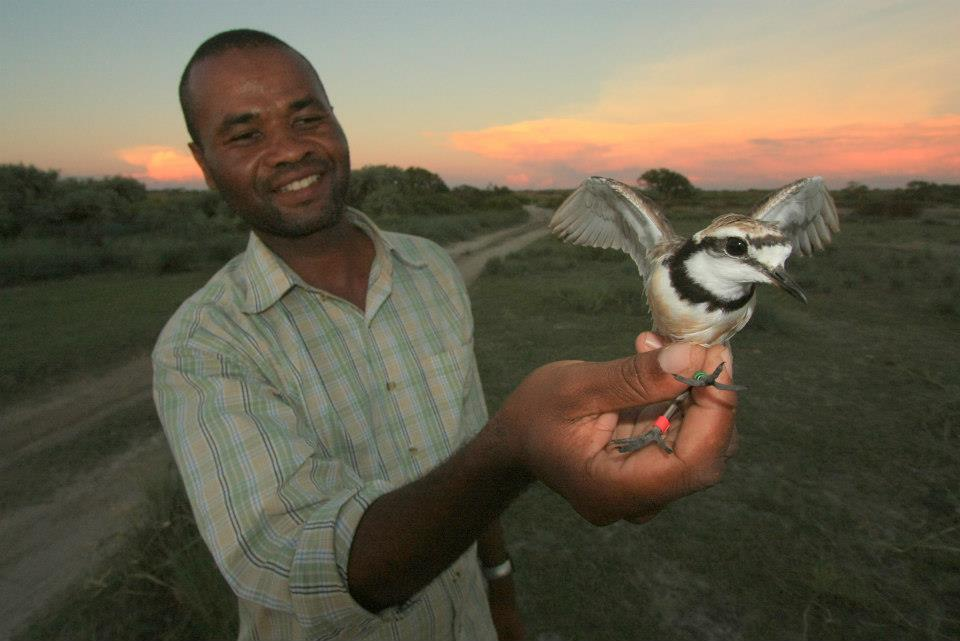
A Madagascar plover in the hand

Adult males and females have sexually monomorphic plumage, however females are slightly heavier than males and have longer wings, suggesting slight sexual dimorphism. The breeding plumage of the Madagascar plover consists of a white forehead bordered by a black bar and a black crown band, with a white crown band just above. An extra black band is present running from behind the eye, around the hind neck, along with a thick black band across upper chest. The rest of the face is white. Adults weigh 31-43 g, with females weighing on average 37.8 g and males 36.4 g. From the mantle and scapular feathers to the rump, the plumage is greyish brown. The central two feathers of the tail are grey/brown, with the outer feathers a lighter shade with darker distal bands and white tips. The underparts are white, with a rufous lower belly and undertail coverts. The bill, legs and eyes are black during the breeding season. Outside of breeding season, the species' appearance is duller, with the black markings more brown. Downy young weigh about 7.1 g and have a lime-green bill that turns brownish black towards the tip, with brown eyes and dull lime-green legs.

== Calls ==
Calling consists of a short 'pip' repeated every 2-3 s, as well as a 'pipipipreeeet' single note repeated rapidly 3-6 times. Adults call during the breeding season when joining groups, flying, alarming, and attending chicks. The alarm call is a 'qui qui qui qui' whilst flapping wings. When the predator is clear a 'tick tick' sound can be heard.

== Distribution and habitat ==
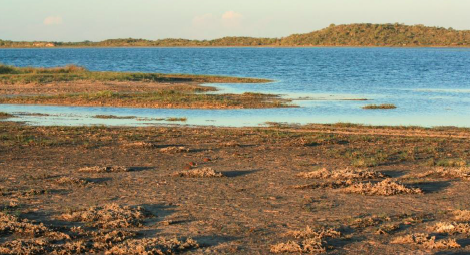
Madagascar plover breeding habitat at Lake Antsirabe, Andavadoaka, Madagascar

The Madagascar plover is the only plover species endemic to Madagascar, and is present mainly on the west and south coasts from Andriamandroro to Tapera. It is estimated that this population occupies 139 km^{2}, and breeds from the Mahavavy River delta in the north to Fort-Dauphin in the south-east. Nests are predominantly found in sparsely vegetated habitats such as grasslands, coastal mudflats, salt marshes, edges of alkaline lakes and mangroves, and breeding does not extend more than a few kilometers inland. The Madagascar plover is not known to migrate.

== Behaviour and ecology ==
The breeding success of Madagascar plovers is very low, with an estimated 22.9% nest success, long re-nesting intervals (52 days), and a low rate of re-nesting. Lake Tsimanampetsotsa and Marambitsy Bay have the highest number of nesting plovers. The breeding season is between August and June, with peak egg laying between April and December. Two clutches of eggs are laid each season. Madagascar plovers are long-lived birds with life-expectancies of approximately 9 years, although there is evidence that individuals can live much longer than this.

=== Nesting ===
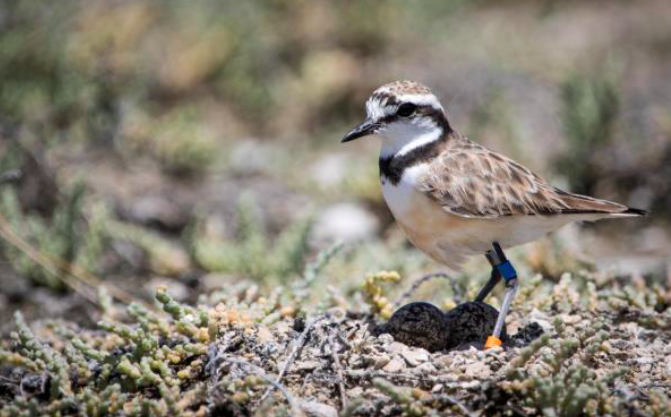
Madagascar plover incubates a nest

A Madagascar plover nest comprises a small scrape in the ground, most commonly in dry soil in grasslands, open mudflats, bordering mangroves and alkaline lakes. Scrapes are lined with material from plants, both fresh and dry, and can also include small pebbles and shell debris. One to two eggs are usually laid at 2-3 day intervals. They measure about 33 x 24 mm and have a volume of 8–9 cm^{3}. Nests are commonly found near living vegetation (varying with environment) and are on average located 2–50 m away from the water's edge, as water bodies are vital for feeding. Both parents help to build and defend the nest, with mate site fidelity and pair-bonding being high.

Both sexes contribute to the incubation of the eggs with equal effort, with incubation beginning 1–3 days after the last egg is laid. Eggs may be shaded from the sun before incubation begins. Eggs are incubated for the majority of the day and shaded during the hottest parts of the day. The incubation period lasts for 27–28 days after the last egg is laid. When eggs are unattended they are covered for protection and camouflage, and when approached by predators they are defended by both parents. Eggs take approximately 30 days to hatch, and both parents participate in brood care. Chicks are able to fly around 27–37 days after hatching, and fledge 1–5 days later.

== Conservation ==
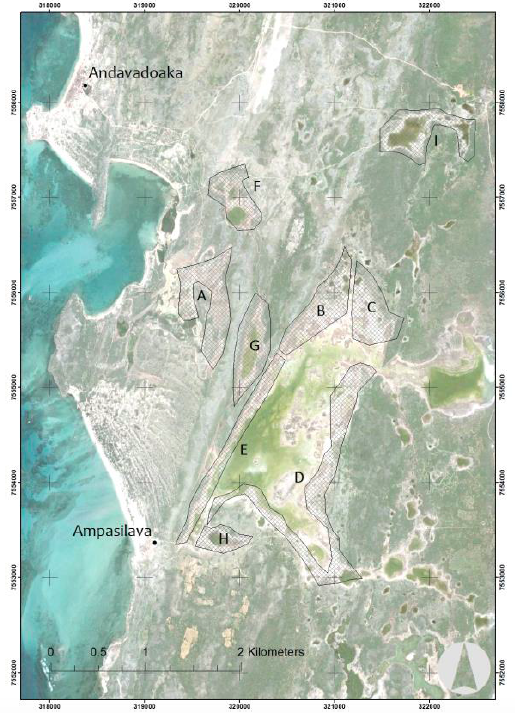
Sites with known conservation and research efforts, marked by capital letters.

The Madagascar plover is classified as Vulnerable by the IUCN.

The small population is believed to be undergoing continuous decline due to pressure on its wetland habitat. The species is the rarest breeding plover in Madagascar, and it is estimated that the population consists of 2,700 – 3,500 total individuals, or roughly 1,800 – 2,300 mature birds as of 2023. Additionally, nesting success is very low, and life history traits do not enable the species to reproduce quick enough to recover.

The main threat is habitat loss or degradation, mainly due to the conversion of many natural plover wetland habitats to rice paddies and shrimp farms. As the population is restricted to specialised wetland habitats, they are especially vulnerable to habitat degradation. Cattle may aid the population by creating space to nest, but present the inevitable risk of trampling of birds and nests. The Madagascar plover's life history traits such as small clutch sizes, long incubation periods, slow chick growth and long re-nesting intervals make it less able to withstand environmental change, and thus very sensitive to habitat threats.

Three nesting localities are located in protected national parks: Lake Tsimanampetsotsa, Kirindy Mitea, and Baly Bay. Control of predators has been suggested as a conservation measure, however this may be difficult as the predators themselves may be endemic to Madagascar, endangered, or protected species.
