= Paroedura stellata =

Scientific classification
- Kingdom: Animalia
- Phylum: Chordata
- Class: Reptilia
- Order: Squamata
- Suborder: Gekkota
- Family: Gekkonidae
- Genus: Paroedura
- Species: P. stellata

Binomial name
- Paroedura stellata Hawlitschek & Glaw, 2012

Species of lizard

Paroedura stellata is a species of lizard in the family Gekkonidae. It is endemic to the Comoro Islands.
