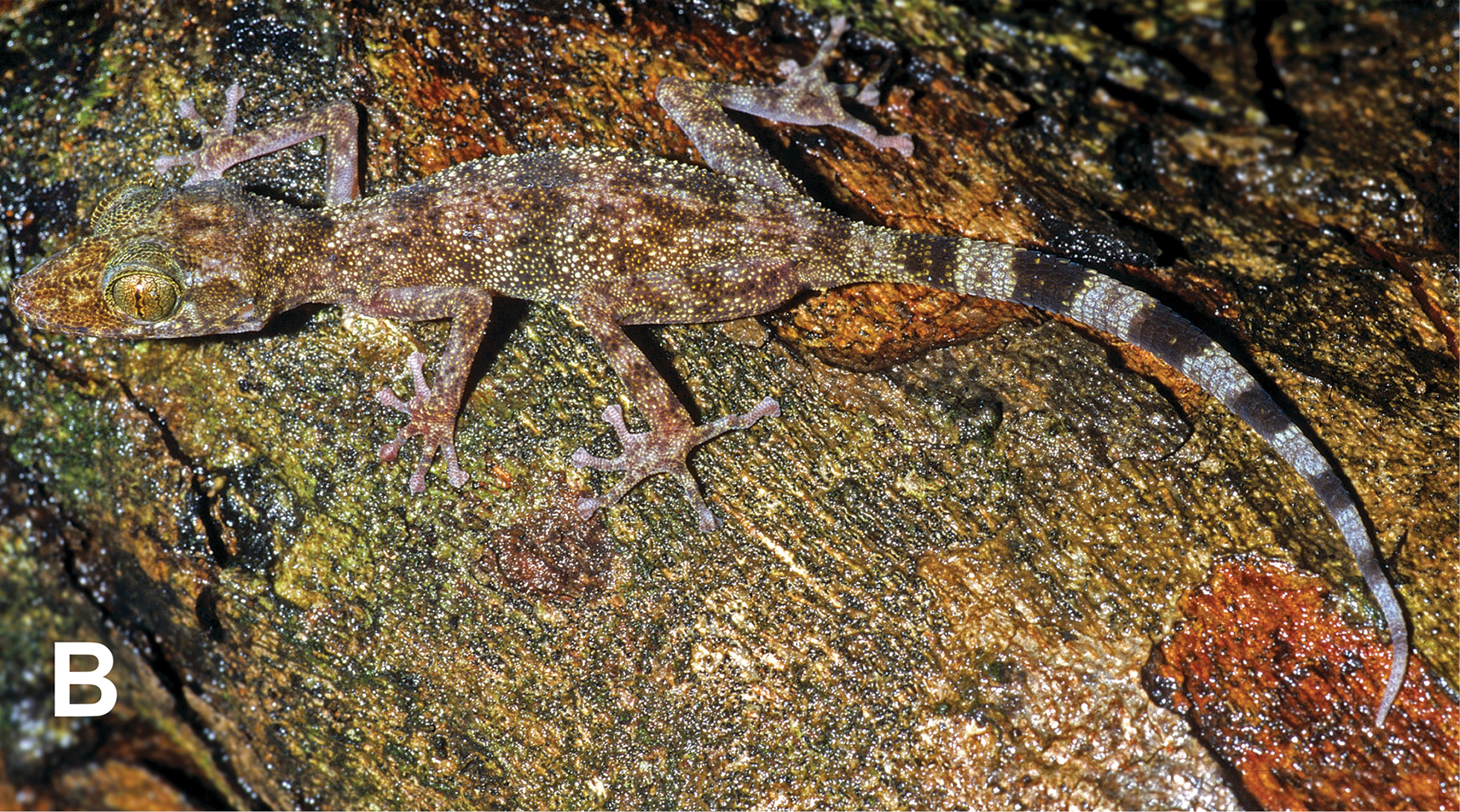

Conservation status
- Least Concern (IUCN 3.1)

Scientific classification
- Kingdom: Animalia
- Phylum: Chordata
- Class: Reptilia
- Order: Squamata
- Suborder: Gekkota
- Family: Gekkonidae
- Genus: Paroedura
- Species: P. homalorhina

Binomial name
- Paroedura homalorhina (Angel, 1936)

Synonyms
- Phyllodactylus homalorhinus

= Northern Madagascar ground gecko =

Species of lizard

The northern Madagascar ground gecko (Paroedura homalorhina) is a species of lizard in the family Gekkonidae. It is endemic to Madagascar.
