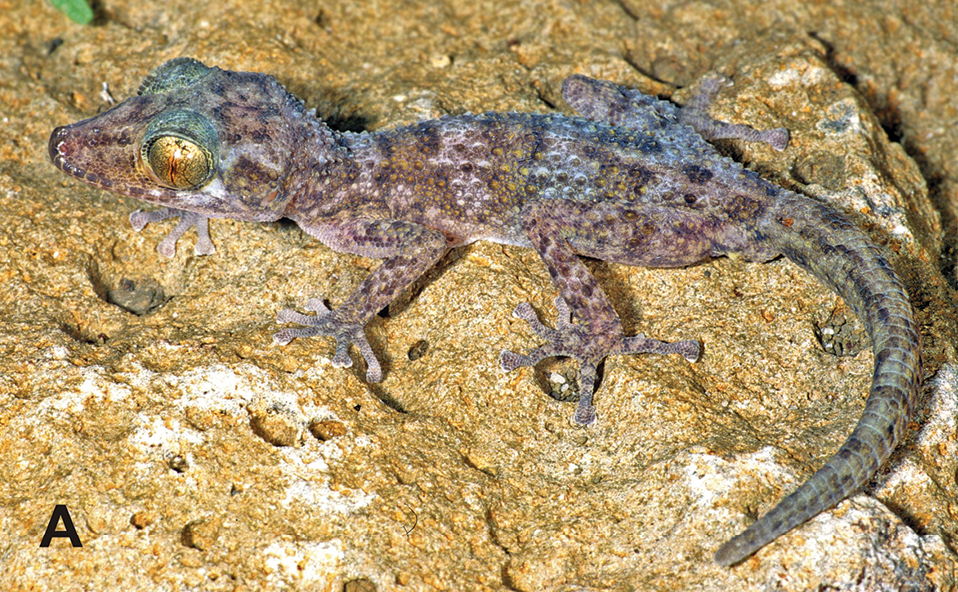

Scientific classification
- Kingdom: Animalia
- Phylum: Chordata
- Class: Reptilia
- Order: Squamata
- Suborder: Gekkota
- Family: Gekkonidae
- Genus: Paroedura
- Species: P. hordiesi

Binomial name
- Paroedura hordiesi Glaw, Rösler, Ineich, Gehring, Köhler, & Vences, 2014

= Hordies' ground gecko =

Species of lizard

Hordies' ground gecko (Paroedura hordiesi) is a species of lizard in the family Gekkonidae. It is endemic to Madagascar.
