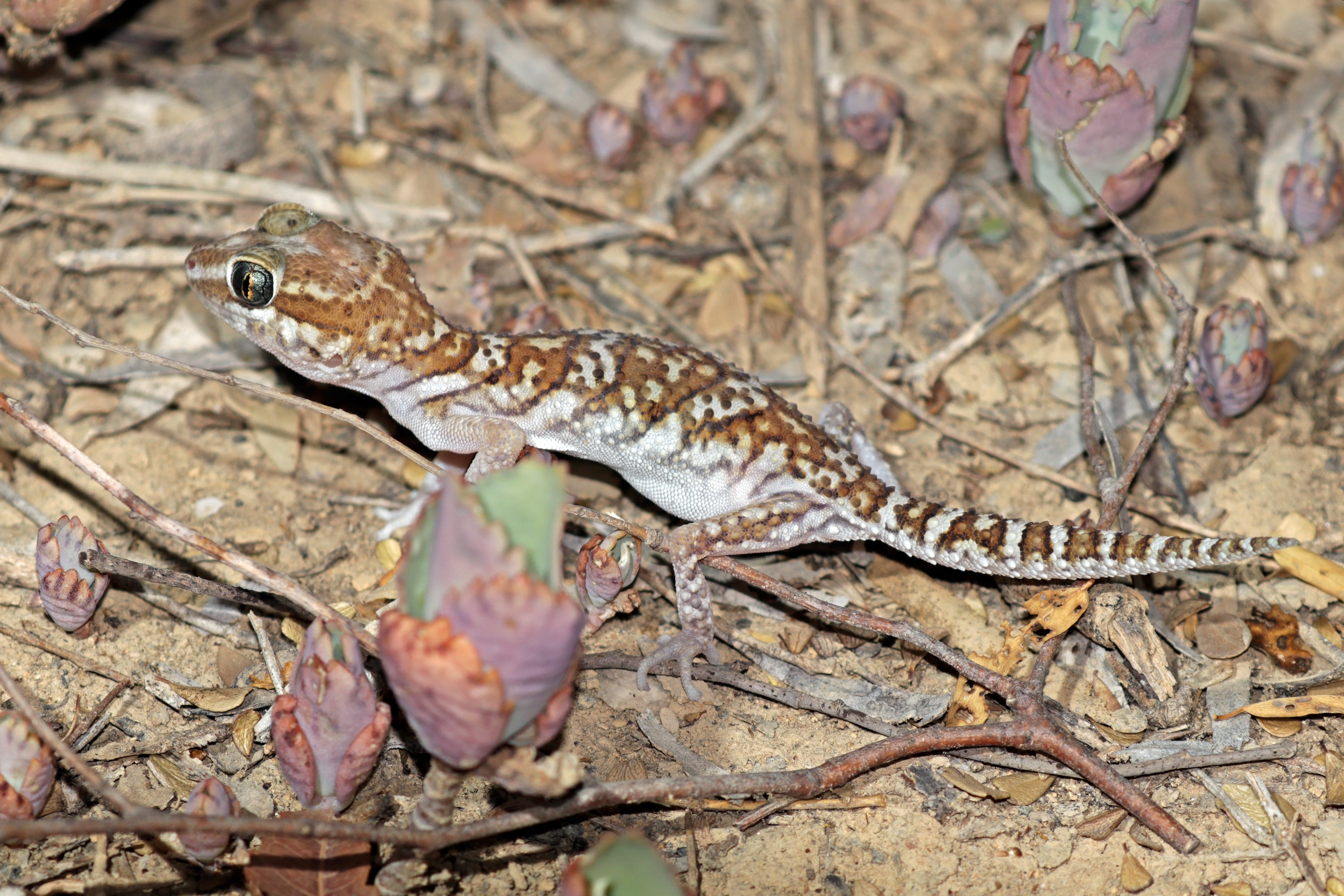
- Arboretum d'Antsokay, Madagascar

Scientific classification
- Kingdom: Animalia
- Phylum: Chordata
- Class: Reptilia
- Order: Squamata
- Suborder: Gekkota
- Family: Gekkonidae
- Genus: Paroedura
- Species: P. picta

Binomial name
- Paroedura picta Peters, 1854
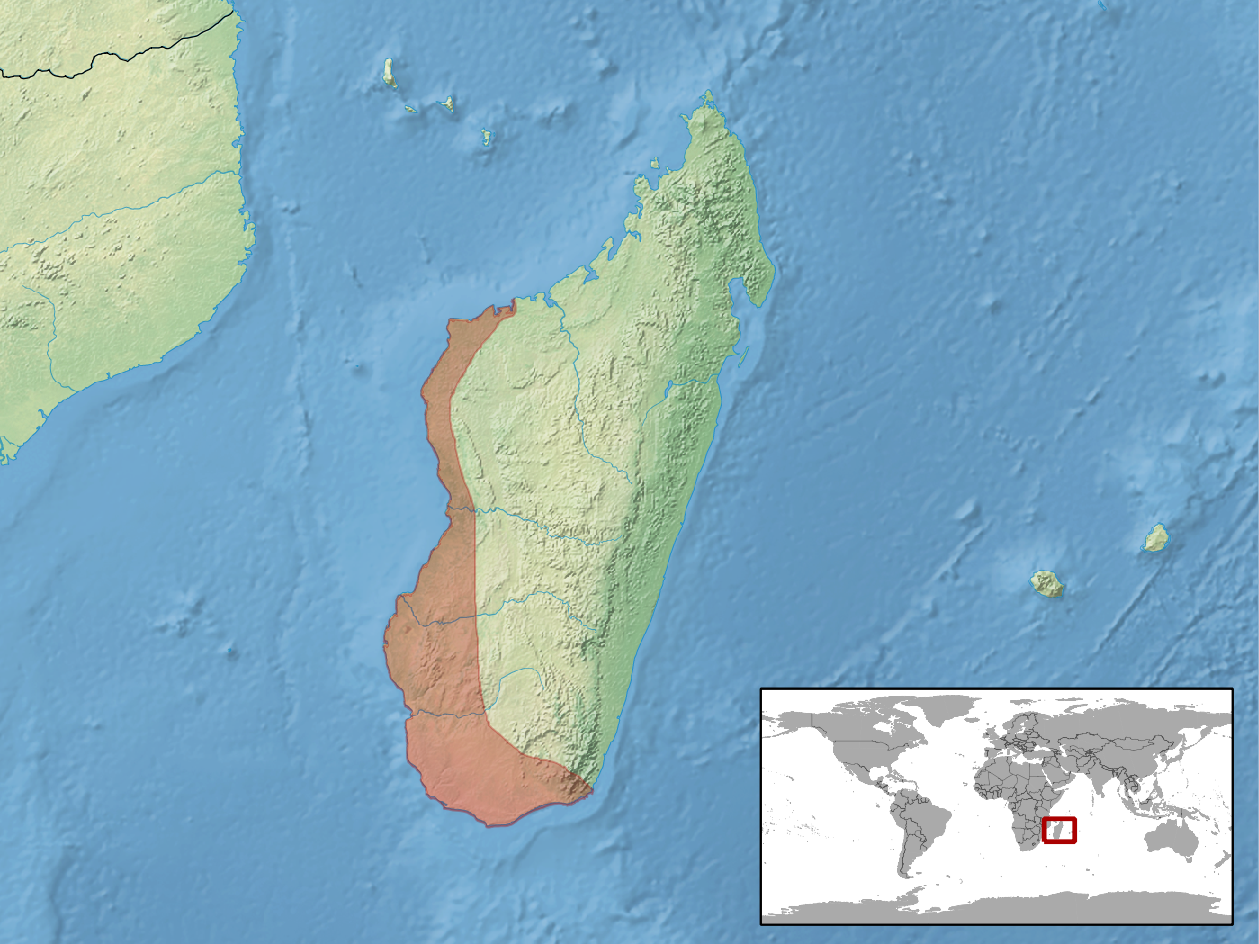

Synonyms
- Diplodactylus pictus; Phyllodactylus pictus; Paroedura pictus

= Ocelot gecko =

Species of lizard

The ocelot gecko (Paroedura picta) is a crepuscular ground-dwelling gecko found in leaf litter in Madagascar forests and is also a popular pet. It is sometimes known as the Madagascar ground gecko, Malagasy fat-tailed gecko, fat-headed gecko, panther gecko or pictus gecko

== Characteristics ==
P. picta naturally occurs as a brown lizard with black markings. Some individuals may also have a white dorsal stripe. In captivity, there are several color phases available including hypo, orange, anerythristic, and amelanistic (yellow).

They usually reach a size of 4–6 inches (10–15 cm), with some well-cared-for males reaching 8 inches (20 cm). Overall, they are smaller than the average gecko. The ocelot gecko is not a true climbing gecko, but does have the capability to climb a few surfaces. In captivity, it has been known to scale the sides of glass terrariums if startled.

They are exclusively insectivorous.

They are best observed during their preferred hunting time, between dusk and dawn.

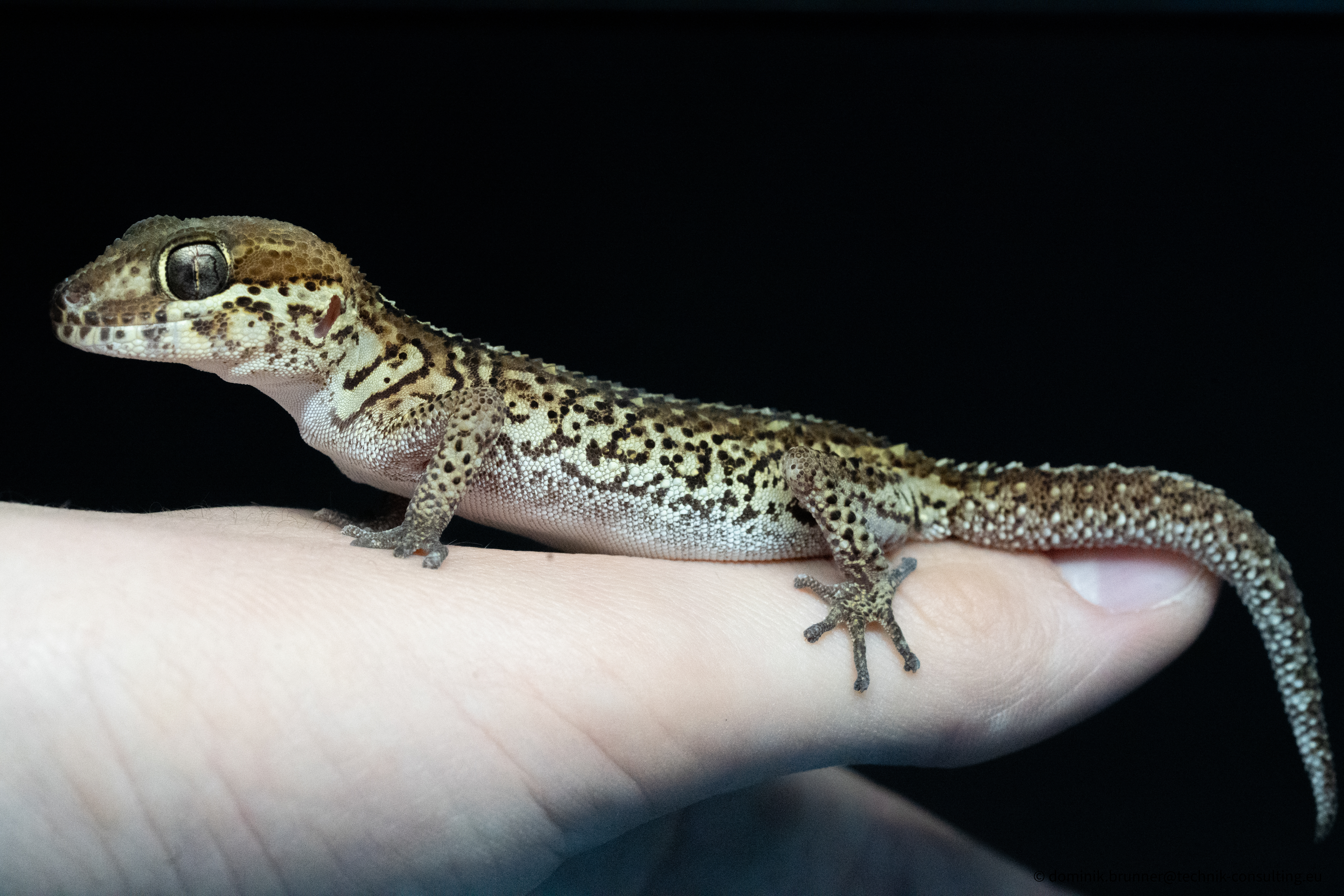
10 month old Paroedura Picta sitting on a thumb

== In captivity ==
These geckos do well in captivity but do not like being handled and may bite if scared. They can live in captivity for between six and ten years.
