= Lake Tsimanampetsotsa =

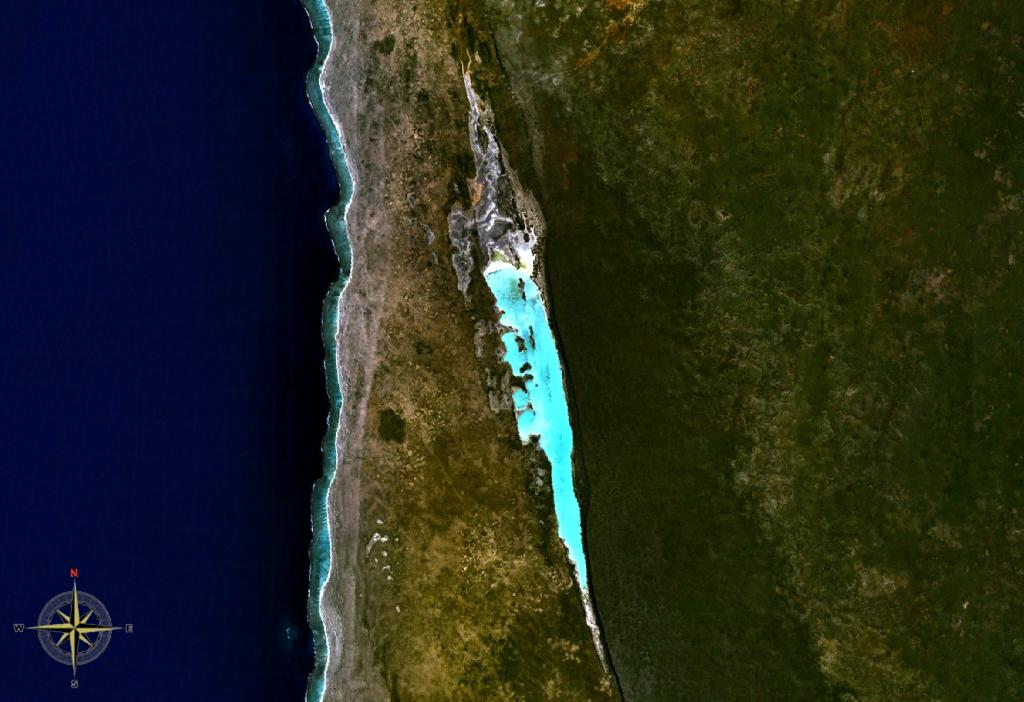
- from space

- Location within Madagascar
- Location: Toliara Province
- Coordinates: 24°07′S 43°45′E
- Type: alkaline lake
- Primary inflows: none
- Primary outflows: none
- Basin countries: Madagascar
- Max. length: 20 km (12 mi)
- Max. width: 2 km (1.2 mi)
- Surface area: 40 km^{2} (15 sq mi)
- Max. depth: 2 m (6 ft 7 in)

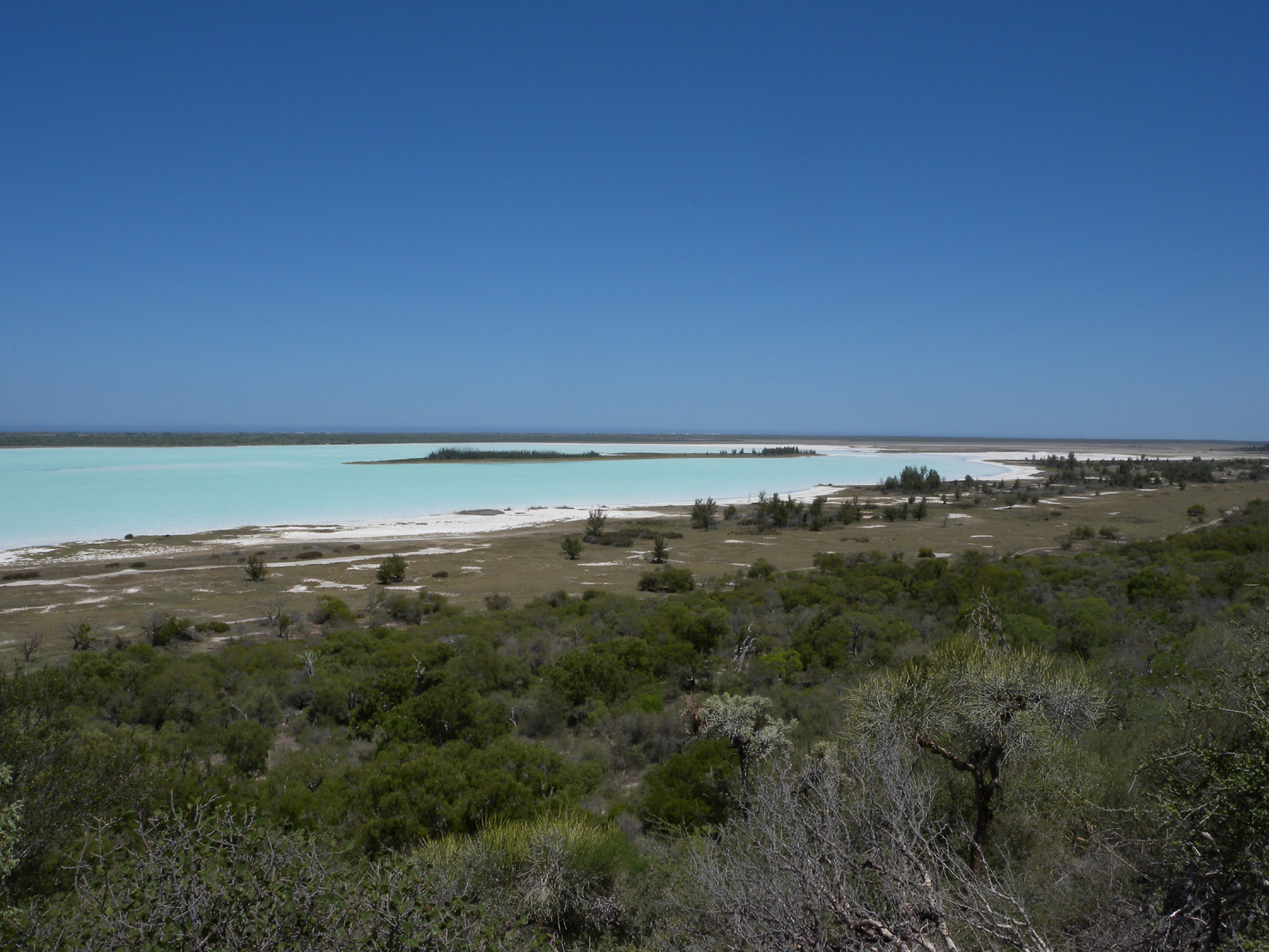
Lake Tsimanampetsotsa

Lake Tsimanampetsotsa (French: Lac Tsimanampetsotsa) (also called Lake Tsimanampesotse) is a moderately alkaline lake in the Toliara Province, in the southwestern part of Madagascar. It is located at around 24°07′S 43°45′E. The lake is protected within Tsimanampetsotsa National Park and it is also within a Ramsar site. The Ramsar site has a total area of 456 km^{2} (176 sq mi), while the surface of the lake is much smaller.

The name of the lake in Malagasy means "lake without dolphins". It is a sacred place for worship, ceremonies and rituals. Local taboos prevent water pollution. Swimming and the utilisation of pirogues is prohibited. Water, mud and some plants from the lake are used in traditional medicine (Tahirindraza and Marikandia 2015).

The lake is about 20 km (12 mi) long, about 2 km (1.2 mi) wide and is quite shallow (maximum depth about 2 m (6 ft 7 in)). It is situated in a collapse area of the Mahfaly Plateau, in a closed evaporite basin with cliffs of Eocene marine limestone to the east and a wide strip of alluvium, capping low outcrops of limestone to the west. The area is covered by sand deposits of recent and Quaternary origin. In pre-history, there was a paleolake here complete with overland drainage (deltaic sediments laid down by a paleodrainage system have been found). The paleolake was much greater in size and depth, as evidenced by strand lines that ring the outer edges of the basin.

The water is “sodic”, highly mineralised and moderately alkaline (pH ~ 8.0) with relatively high concentrations of ammonia and phosphate. Salt concentrations approach that found in seawater, becoming somewhat diluted during the rainy season. The lake may be directly connected to the sea, but this is a matter of conjecture that has not been verified. The eastern part of the lake receives some freshwater flow and so has consistently lower salt concentrations than the western part. The basin is shallow resulting in dramatic variation in the surface area of the lake with even small changes in water level. Water levels can drop significantly during the dry season, resulting in a broad exposed area of seasonal hypersaline flats around a shrunken lake.

== Climate and Hydrology ==
Lake Tsimanampetsotsa is in an area with a semi-arid climate; daytime temperatures are high and precipitation low. It is in the lowest precipitation region in Madagascar, receiving only 300 mm (12 in) of rain per year. In addition, rainfall amount and location is highly unpredictable; rain often falls only locally. There are no surface rivers here and the lake has no inlet or outlet. Lake levels are tied to rainfall, along with some underground flow from aquifers located further inland. There is a network of groundwater that surfaces at the foot of the Mahfaly Plateau, with three permanent springs (Mande, Andranonaomby and Manava) and numerous seeps and intermittent springs. Lake levels rise with sufficient rainfall, and drop when water evaporates faster than it is being replenished.

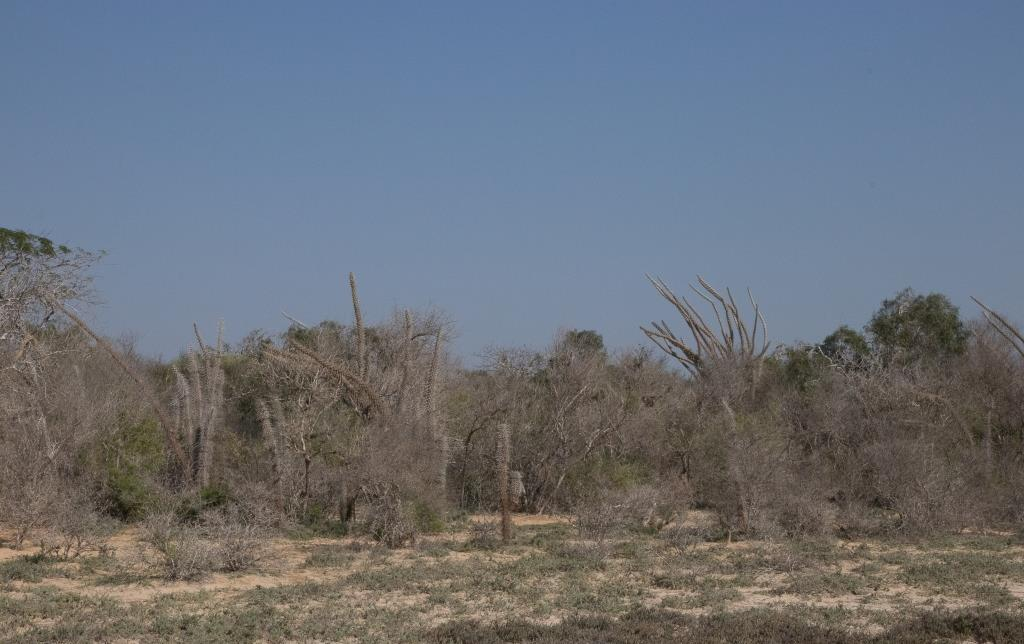
Dry forest on sandy soils of lakeTsimanampetsotsa

== Vegetation ==
Emergent plant species able to grow in the sodic water include southern cattail (Typha domingensis) and flat-sedge (Cyperus spp.). Glasswort (Salicornia pachystachya) is one of the few species that can tolerate extreme salinity, so it is usually found alone on highly saline sites. Other salt-tolerant species move onto the flats as the water levels recede including Salsola littoralis, Atripex perrieri, as well as some grasses (Sporobolus virginicus, Paspalum vaginatum) and the golden leather fern (Acrostichum aureum). The introduced species beach sheoak (Casuarina equisetifolia) can be found in small stands along the east shore.

== Aquatic Fauna ==
High phosphate concentrations, originating from erosion, are thought to be the main factor limiting the diversity of aquatic fauna. There are no fish. Invertebrates belonging to four taxonomic groups (Annelida, Gastropoda, Crustacea and Insecta) have been documented. Taxonomic richness was at its highest (15 taxa) in April (rainy season) and decreased to 11 taxa in August (dry season). The eastern part of the lake had consistently more species then the western part, probably because of the consistently lower salt concentrations. The crustaceans were the most widespread species. The aquatic fauna documented in Lake Tsimanampetsotsa is as follows:

- Annelida (ringed or segmented worms), family Glossiphoniidae (freshwater jawless leeches).
- Gastropoda species (snails and slugs): Planorbis planorbis (Planorbidae) (ram's horn snails), Georissa petiti (Hydrocanidae) and Potamopyrgus sp. (Hydrobiidae) (mud snails).
- Crustacea species (crustaceans): Grandidierella mahafalensis (Aoridae) and Halmyrapseudes thaumastocheles (Apseudidae).

Insects found included: flies (Diptera); beetles, including nymph of the Dytiscidae (diving beetles) and adults of the Hydroptilidae and Elmidae families; mayflies (Ephemeroptera); bugs (Hemiptera) from 3 families (Naucoridae, Veliidae and Notonectidae); dragonflies of the Libellulidae family and damselflies of the Coenagrionidae family.

== Birds ==
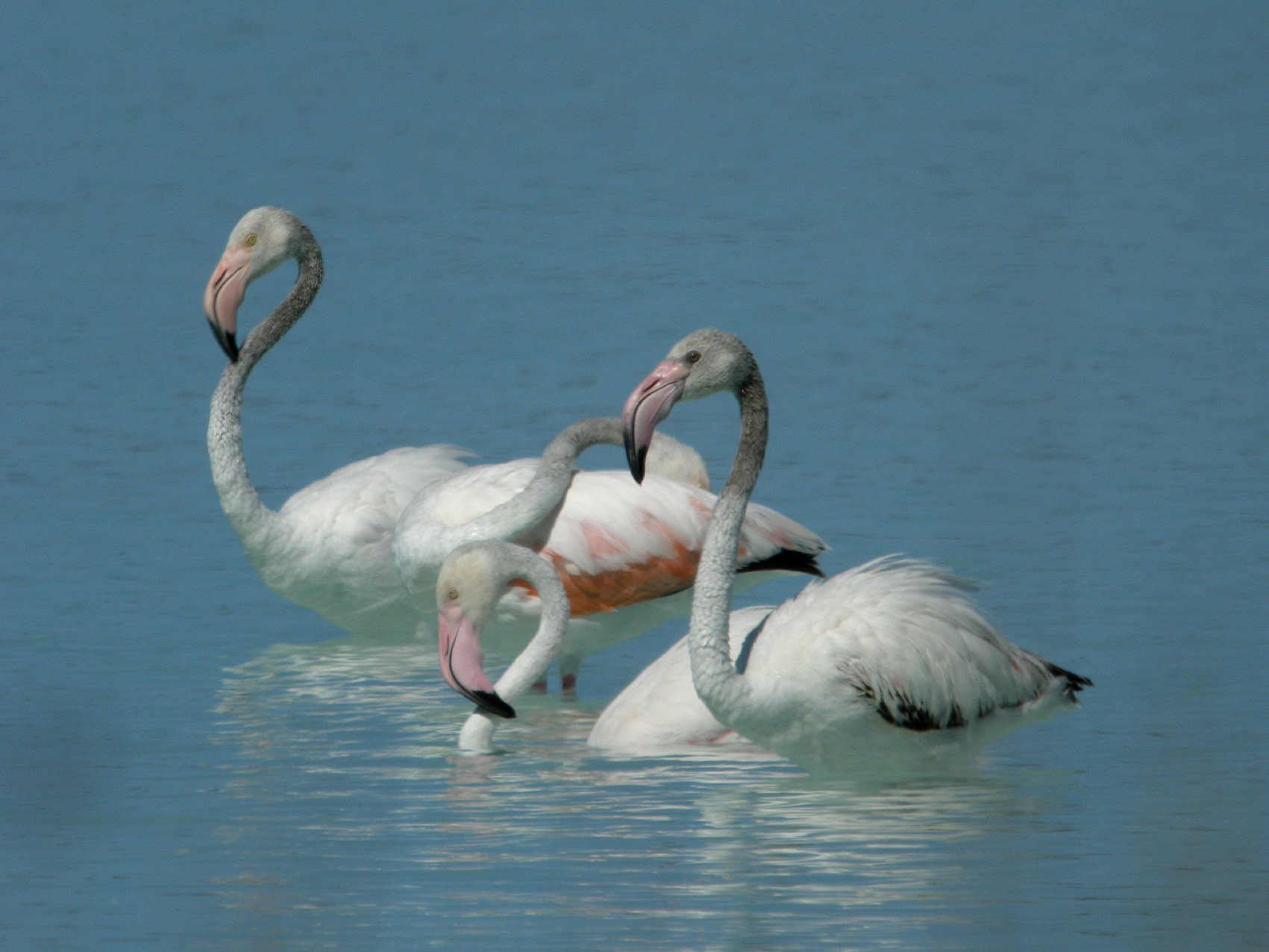
Greater flamingos (Phoenicopterus roseus) in Lake Tsimanampetsotsa

More than 34 bird species are recorded from the lake area. Greater flamingos (Phoenicopterus roseus) are at times present in large numbers and nest on the lake. Lesser flamingos (Phoenicopterus minor) have also been seen here. The lake and saline flats constitute an important habitat for many threatened water bird species, such as Madagascan plover (Charadrius thoracicus) (VU) and supports a breeding colony of Madagascan grebe (Tachybaptus pelzelnii) (EN).

== Towns and villages ==
- Antanandranto
