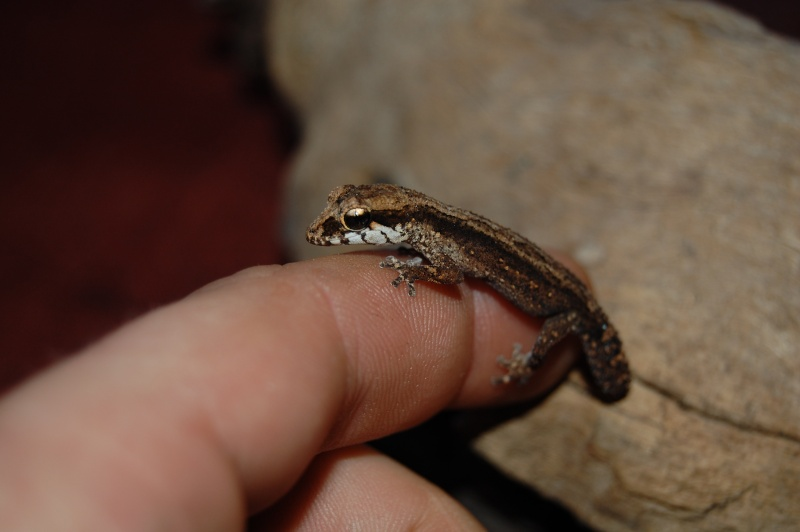

Conservation status
- Vulnerable (IUCN 3.1)
- CITES Appendix II

Scientific classification
- Kingdom: Animalia
- Phylum: Chordata
- Class: Reptilia
- Order: Squamata
- Suborder: Gekkota
- Family: Gekkonidae
- Genus: Paroedura
- Species: P. androyensis

Binomial name
- Paroedura androyensis (Grandidier, 1867)

Synonyms
- Phyllodactylus androyensis

= Grandidier's Madagascar ground gecko =

Species of lizard

Grandidier's Madagascar ground gecko (Paroedura androyensis) is a species of lizard in the family Gekkonidae. It is endemic to Madagascar.
