= List of mammals of Sumatra =

This is a list of mammal species found in the Sumatra, Indonesia.

== Order: Proboscidea ==
=== Family: Elephantidae ===
==== Genus: Elephas ====
Species: Asian elephant (Elephas maximus) EN/en

Subspecies: Sumatran elephant (Elephas maximus sumatranus) CR

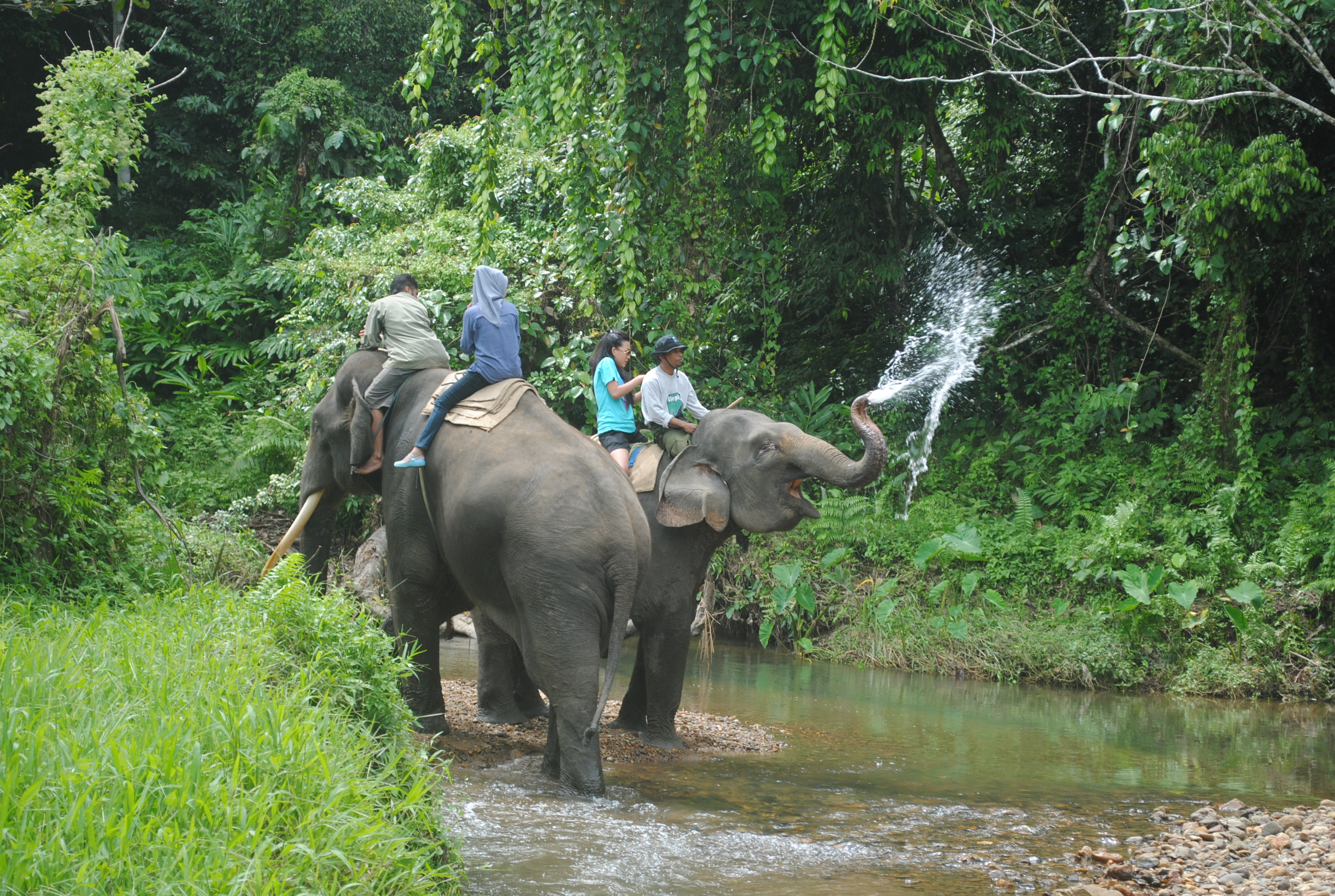

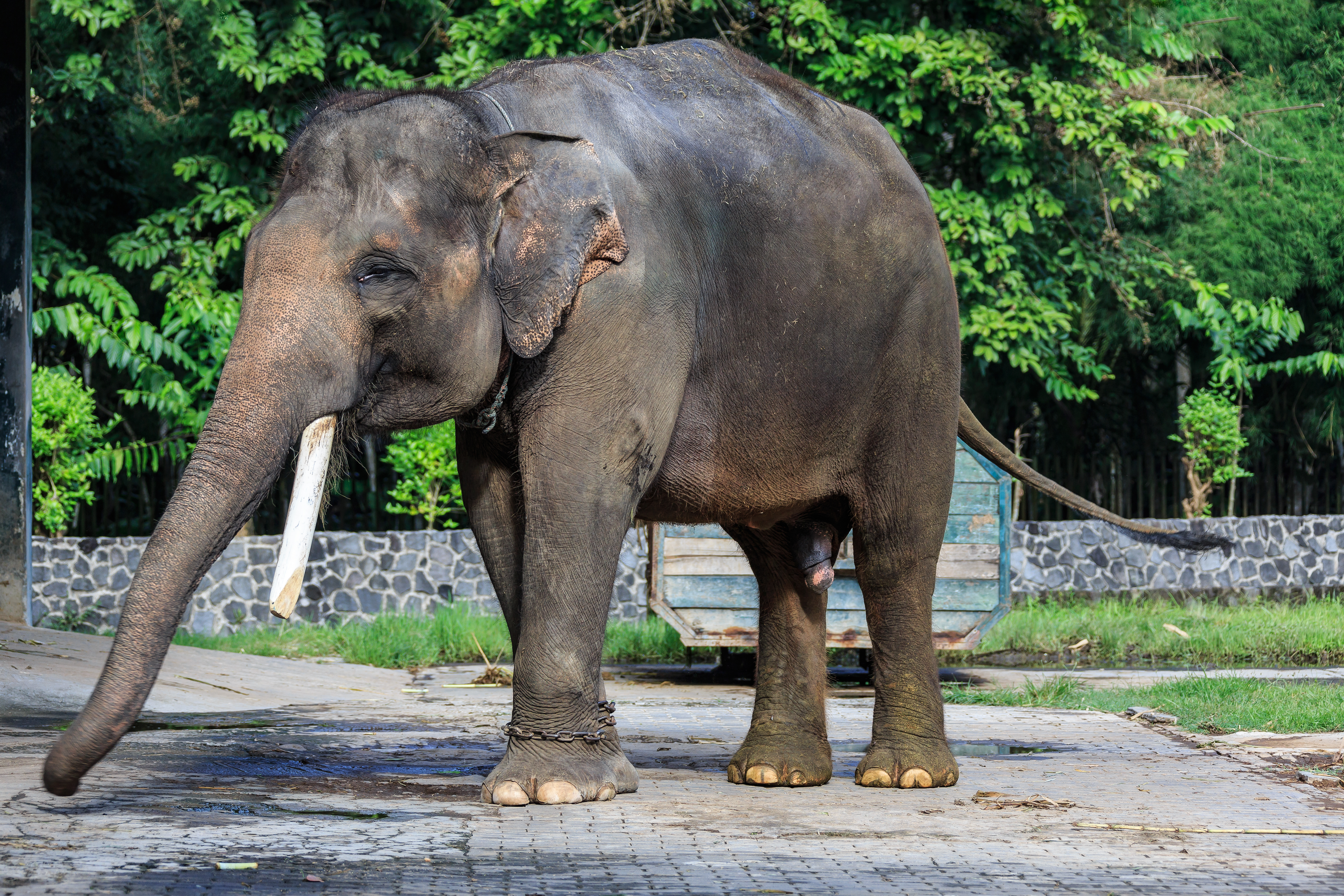

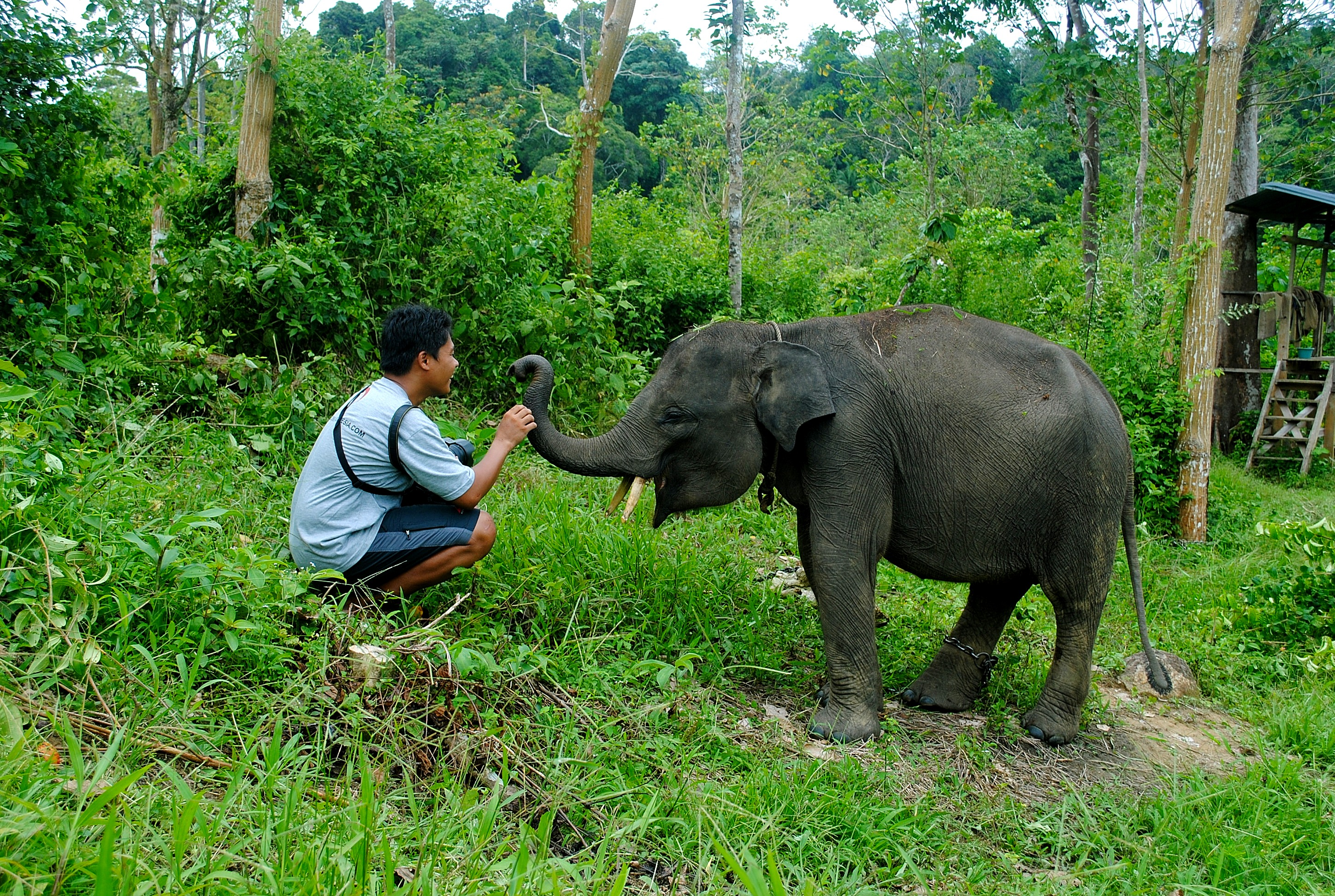

== Order: Eulipotyphla ==
=== Family: Erinaceidae ===
==== Genus: Echinosorex ====
Species: Moonrat (Echinosorex gymnura) LC/lc

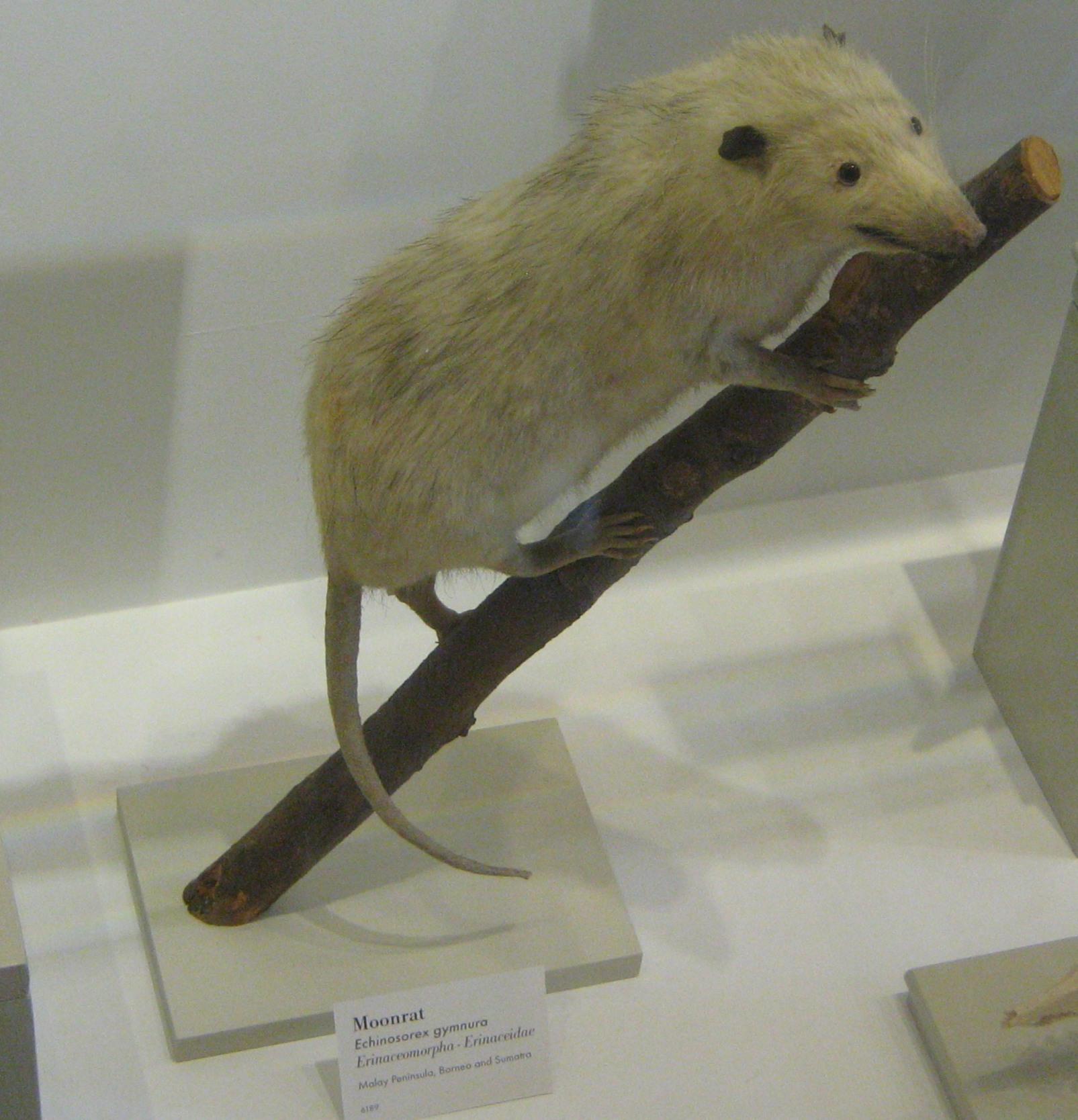

==== Genus: Hylomys ====
Species:

- Dwarf gymnure (Hylomys parvus) VU/vu
- Max's short-tailed gymnure (Hylomys maxi)
- Leuser gymnure (Hylomys vorax)

=== Family: Soricidae (shrews) ===
==== Genus: Chimarrogale ====
Species: Sumatran water shrew (Chimarrogale sumatrana) CR/cr

==== Genus: Crocidura ====
Species:

- Beccari's shrew (Crocidura beccarii) LC/lc
- Hutan shrew (Crocidura hutanis) LC/lc
- Sumatran giant shrew (Crocidura lepidura) LC/lc
- Sunda shrew (Crocidura monticola) LC/LC
- Sumatran long-tailed shrew (Crocidura paradoxura) LC/lc
- Banka shrew (Crocidura vosmaeri) DD/dd

== Order: Chiroptera ==
=== Family: Pteropodidae ===
==== Genus: Aethalops ====
Species: Pygmy fruit bat (Aethalops alecto) LC/lc

==== Genus: Balionycteris ====
Species: Spotted-winged fruit bat (Balionycteris maculata) LC/lc

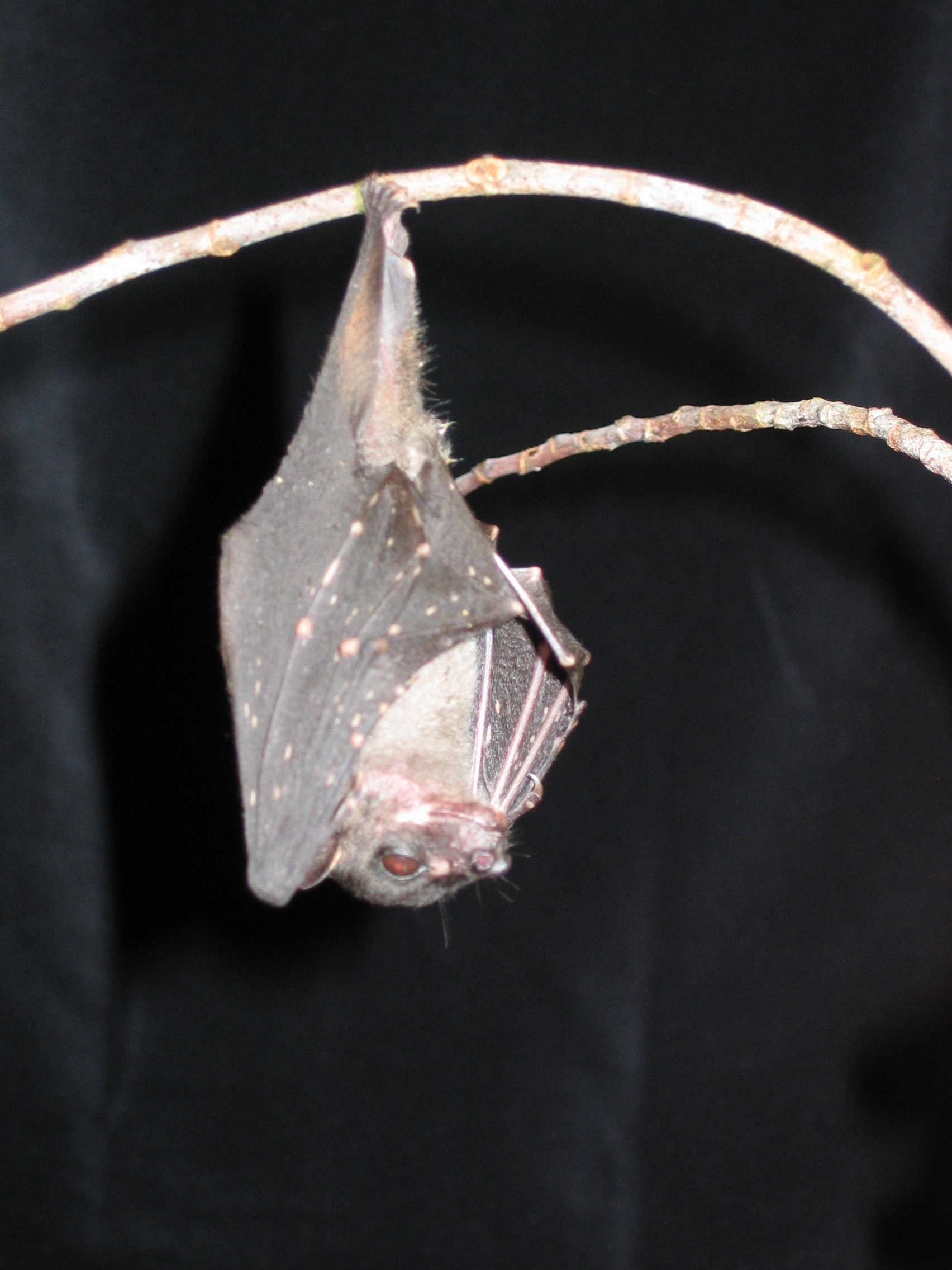

==== Genus: Chironax ====
Species: Black-capped fruit bat (Chironax melanocephalus) LC/lc

==== Genus: Cynopterus ====
Species:

- Lesser short-nosed fruit bat (Cynopterus brachyotis) LC/lc
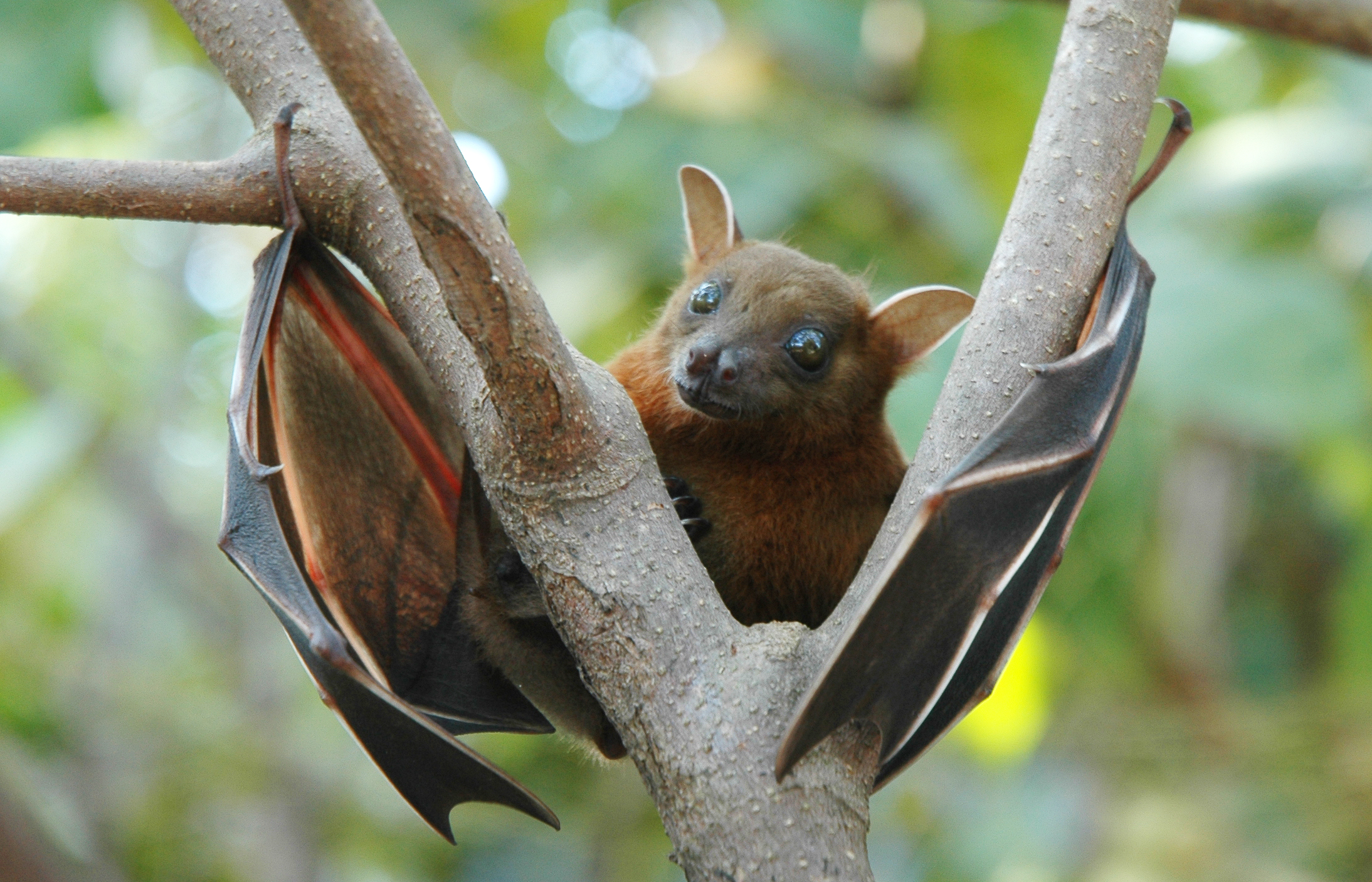

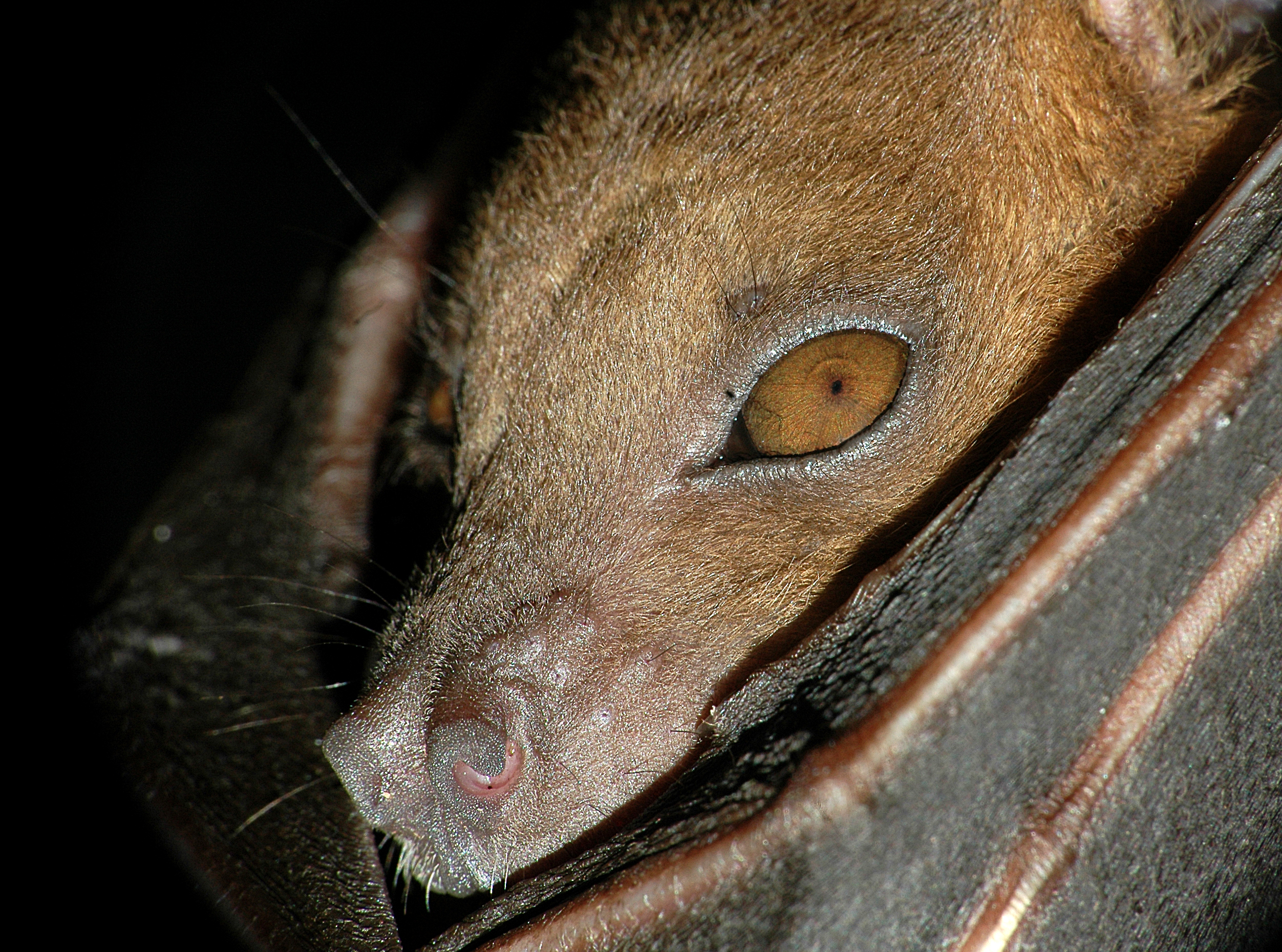

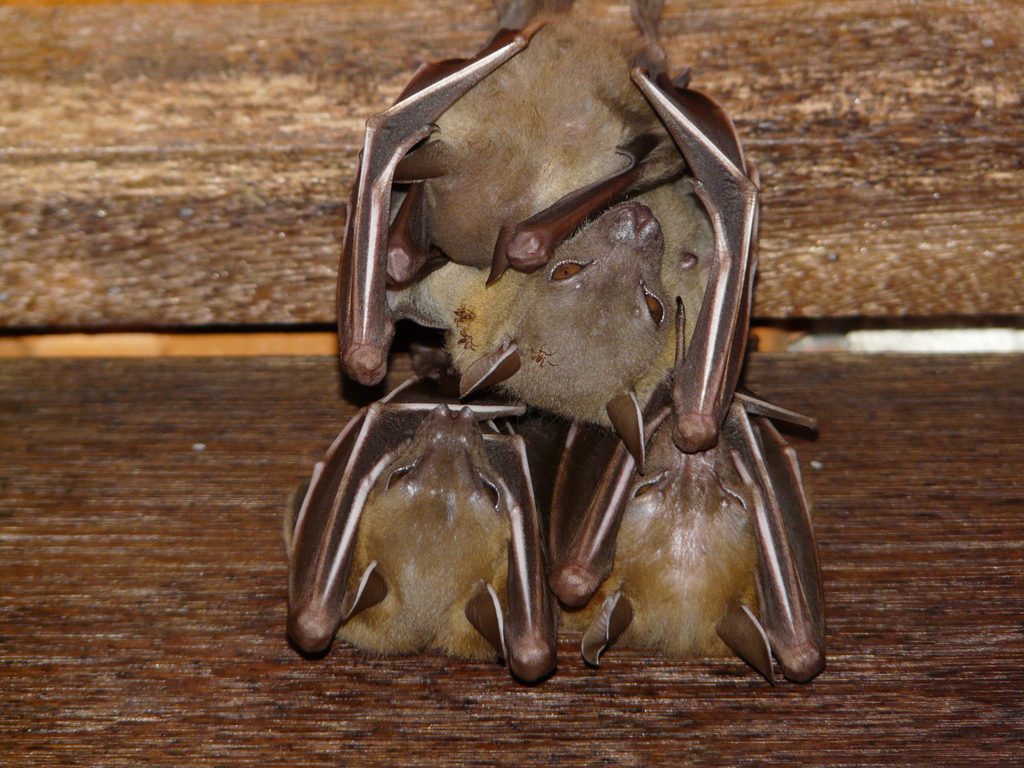
- Horsfield's fruit bat (Cynopterus horsfieldi) LC/lc
- Minute fruit bat (Cynopterus minutus) LC/lc
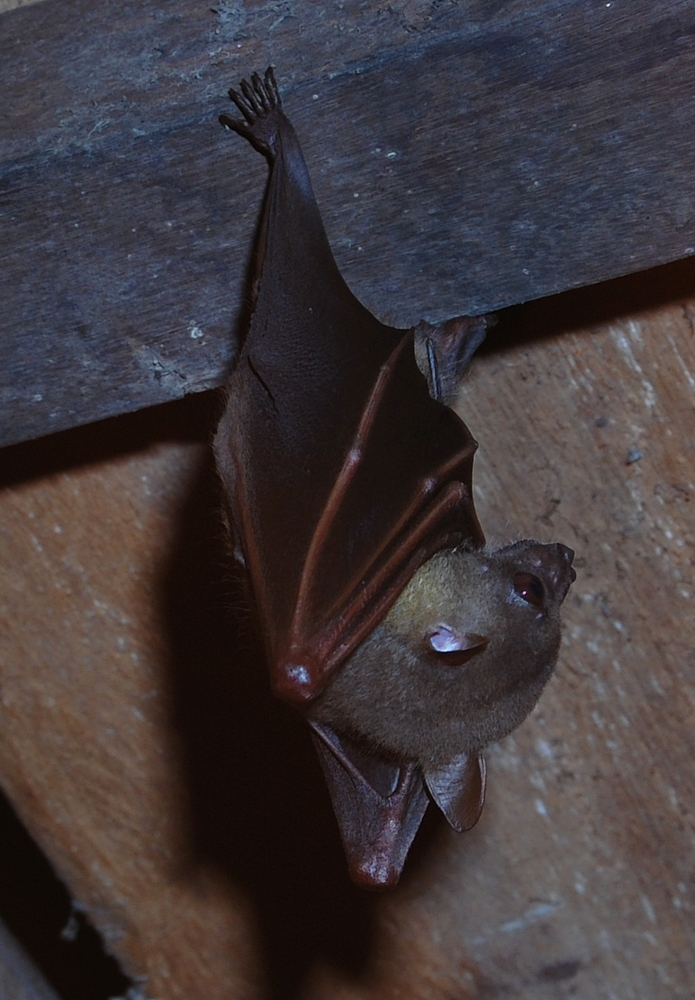

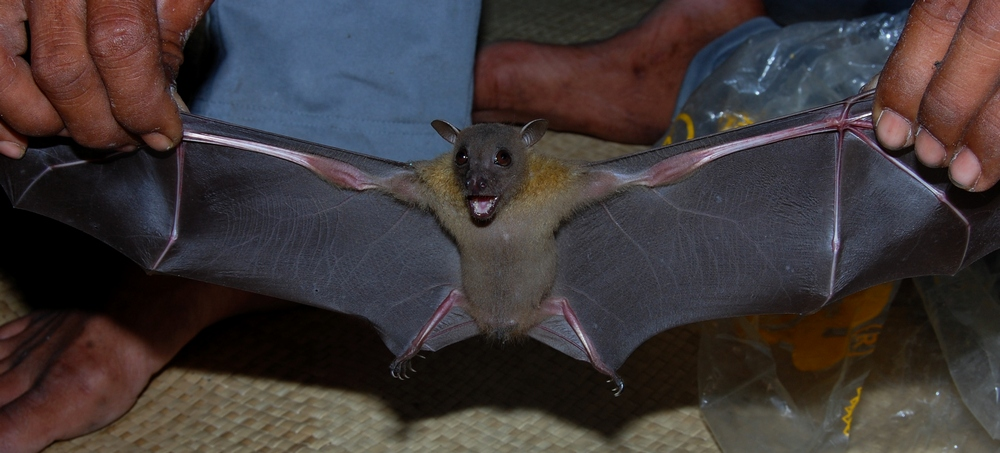

^Greater short-nosed fruit bat (Cynopterus sphinx) LC/lc

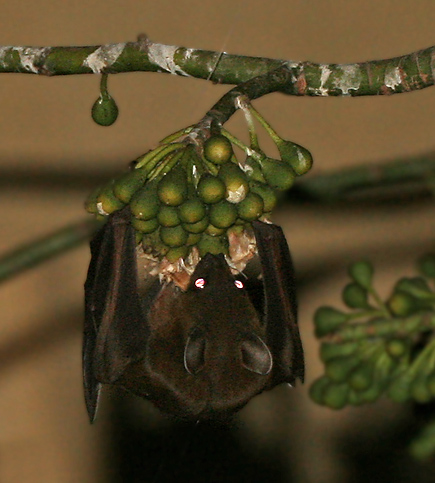

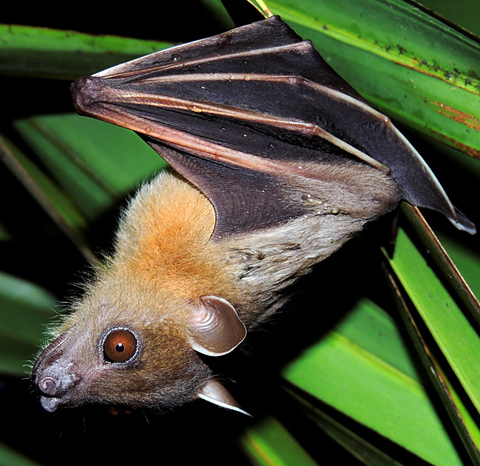

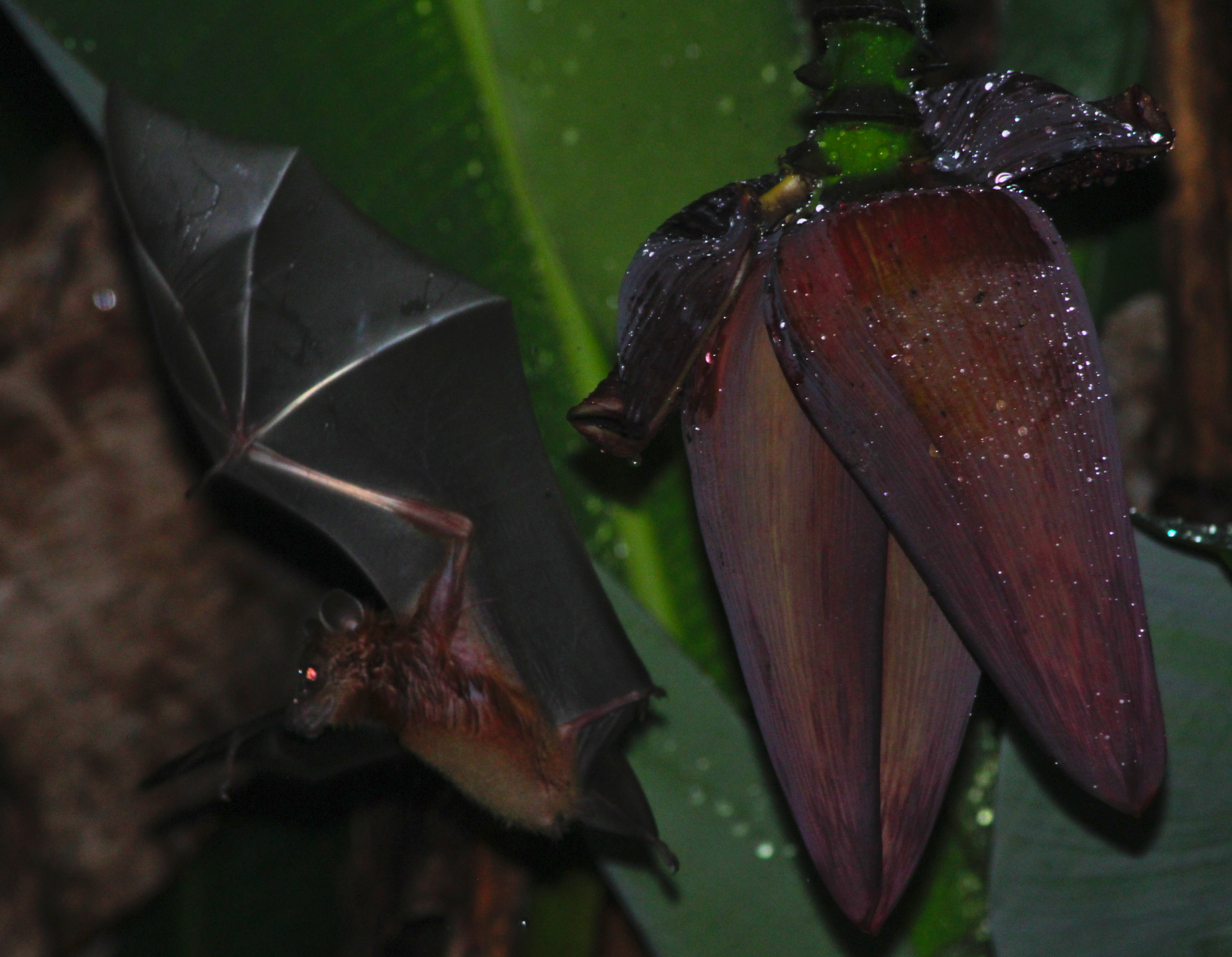
- Indonesian short-nosed fruit bat (Cynopterus titthaecheileus) LC/lc
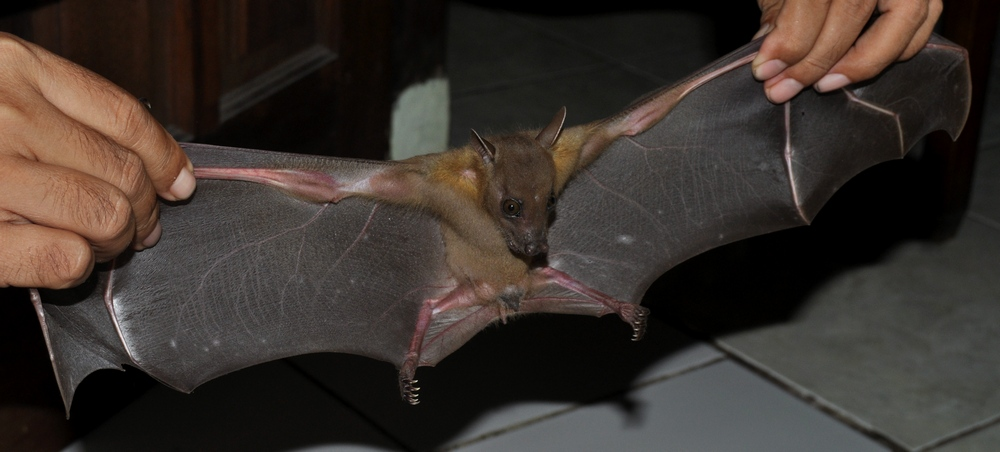

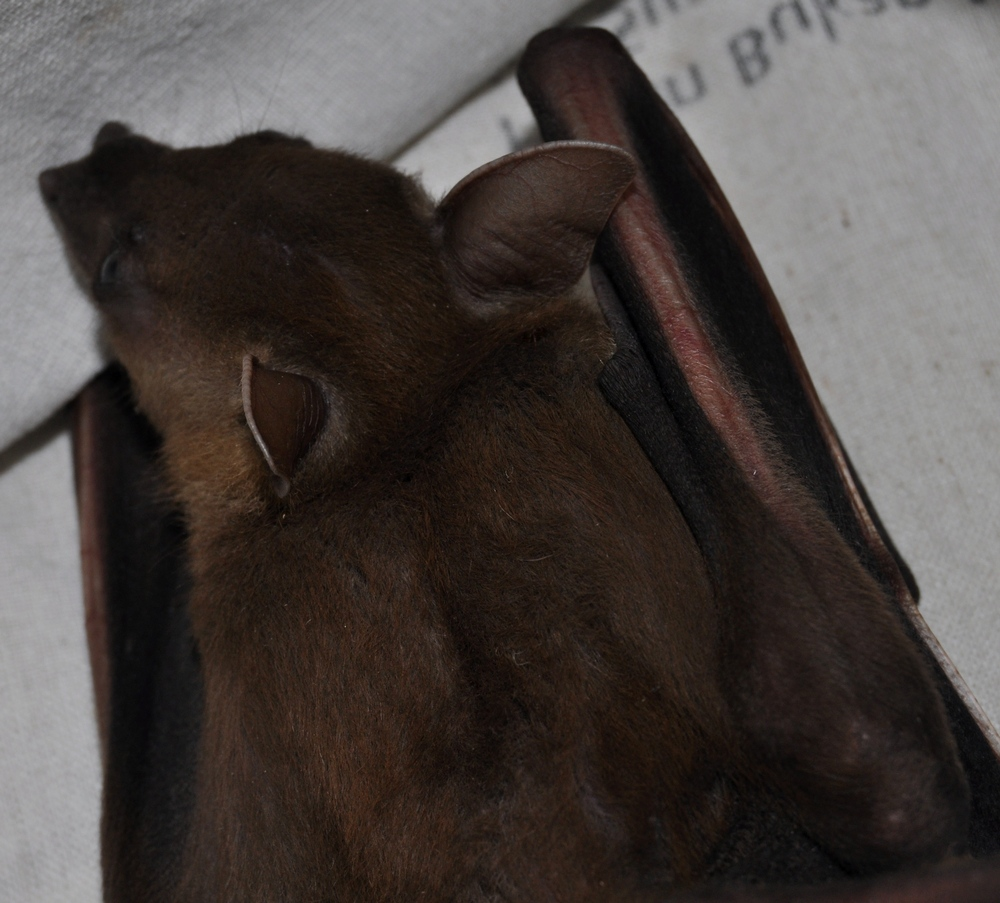

==== Genus: Dyacopterus ====
- Brooks's dyak fruit bat (Dyacopterus brooksi) VU/vu
- Dayak fruit bat (Dyacopterus spadiceus) NT/nt

==== Genus: Eonycteris ====
Species: Cave nectar bat (Eonycteris spelaea) LC/lc

==== Genus: Macroglossus ====
Species:

- Long-tongued nectar bat (Macroglossus minimus) LC/lc
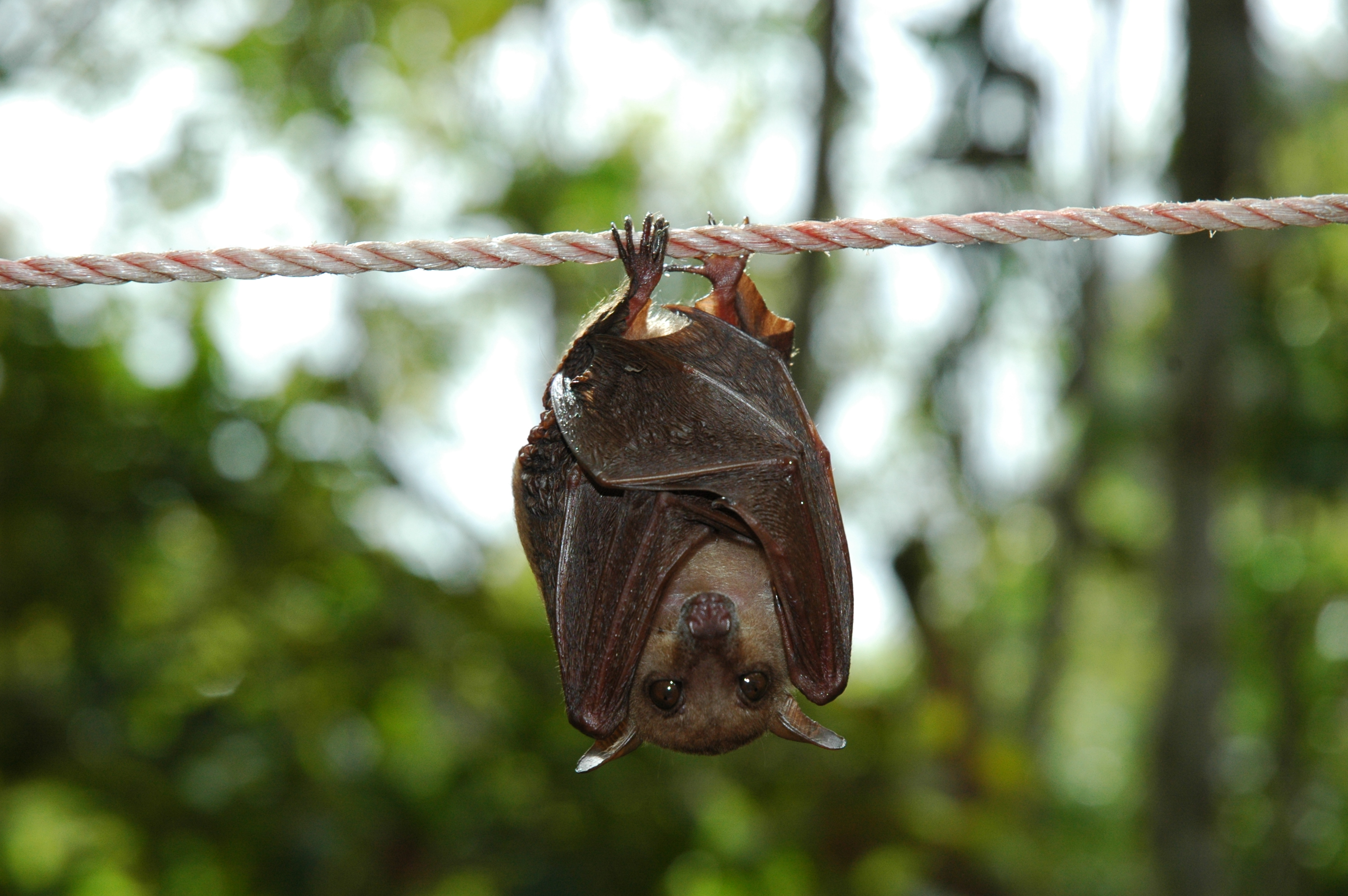

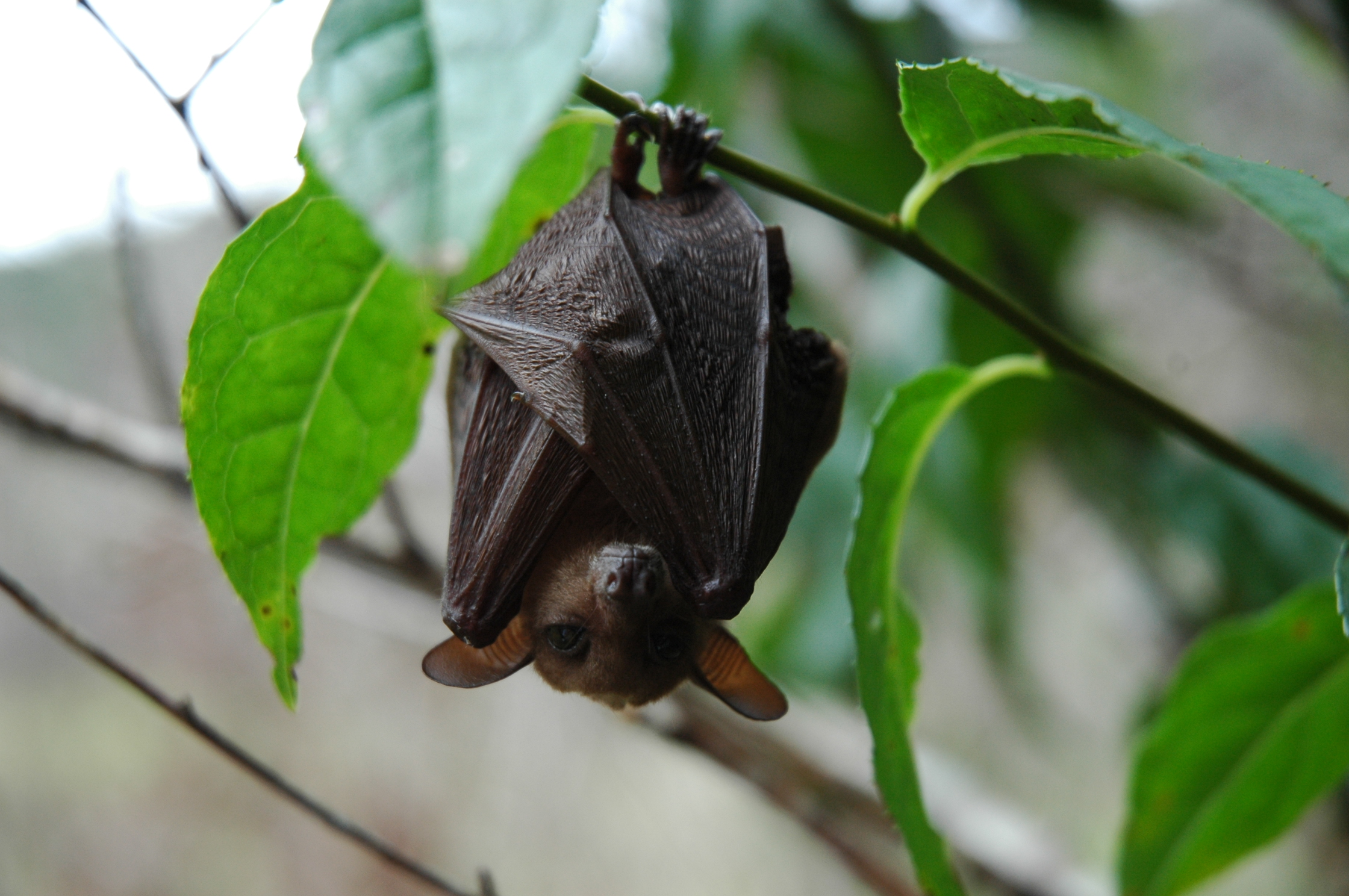

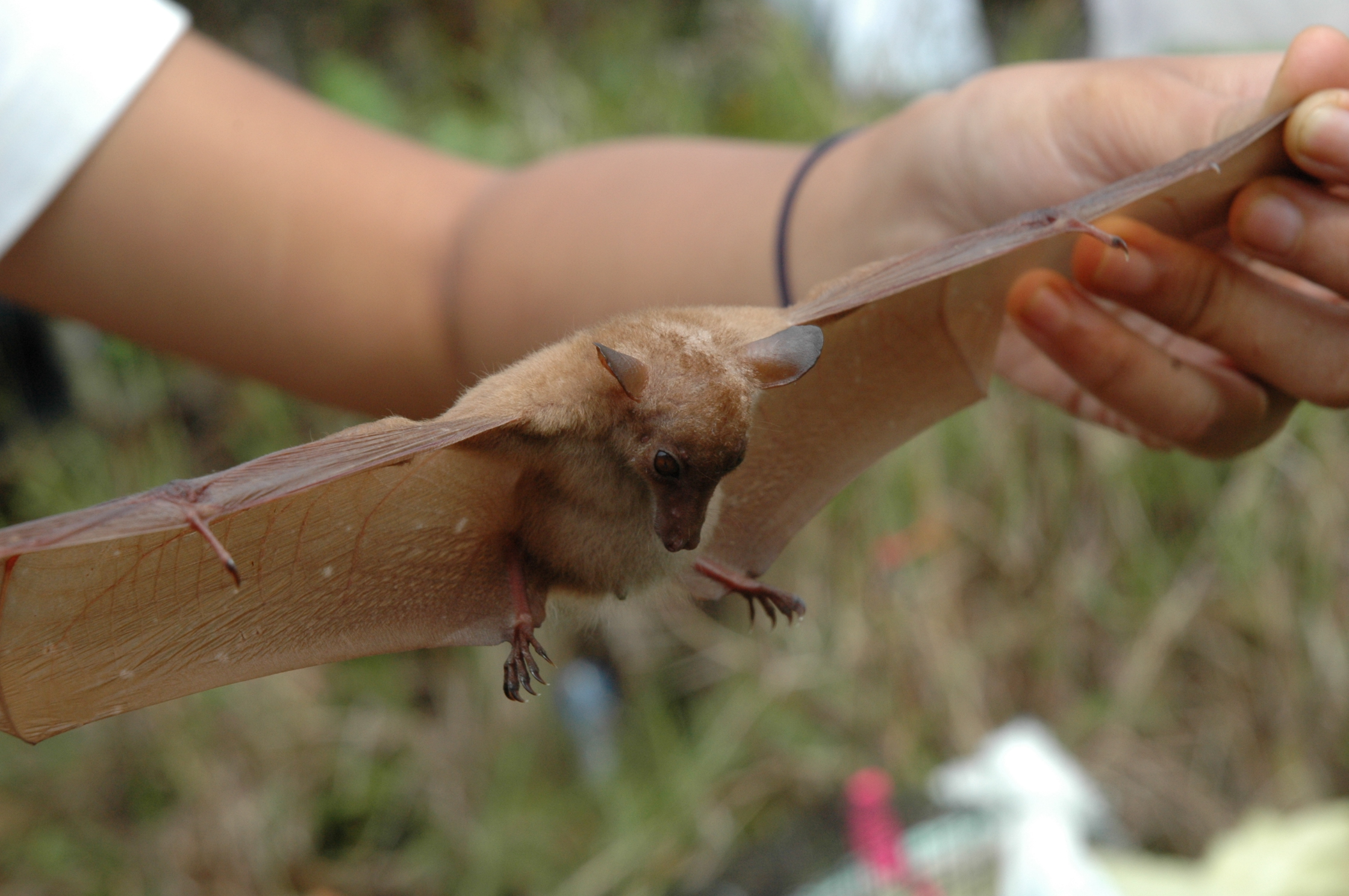
- Long-tongued fruit bat (Macroglossus sobrinus) LC/lc
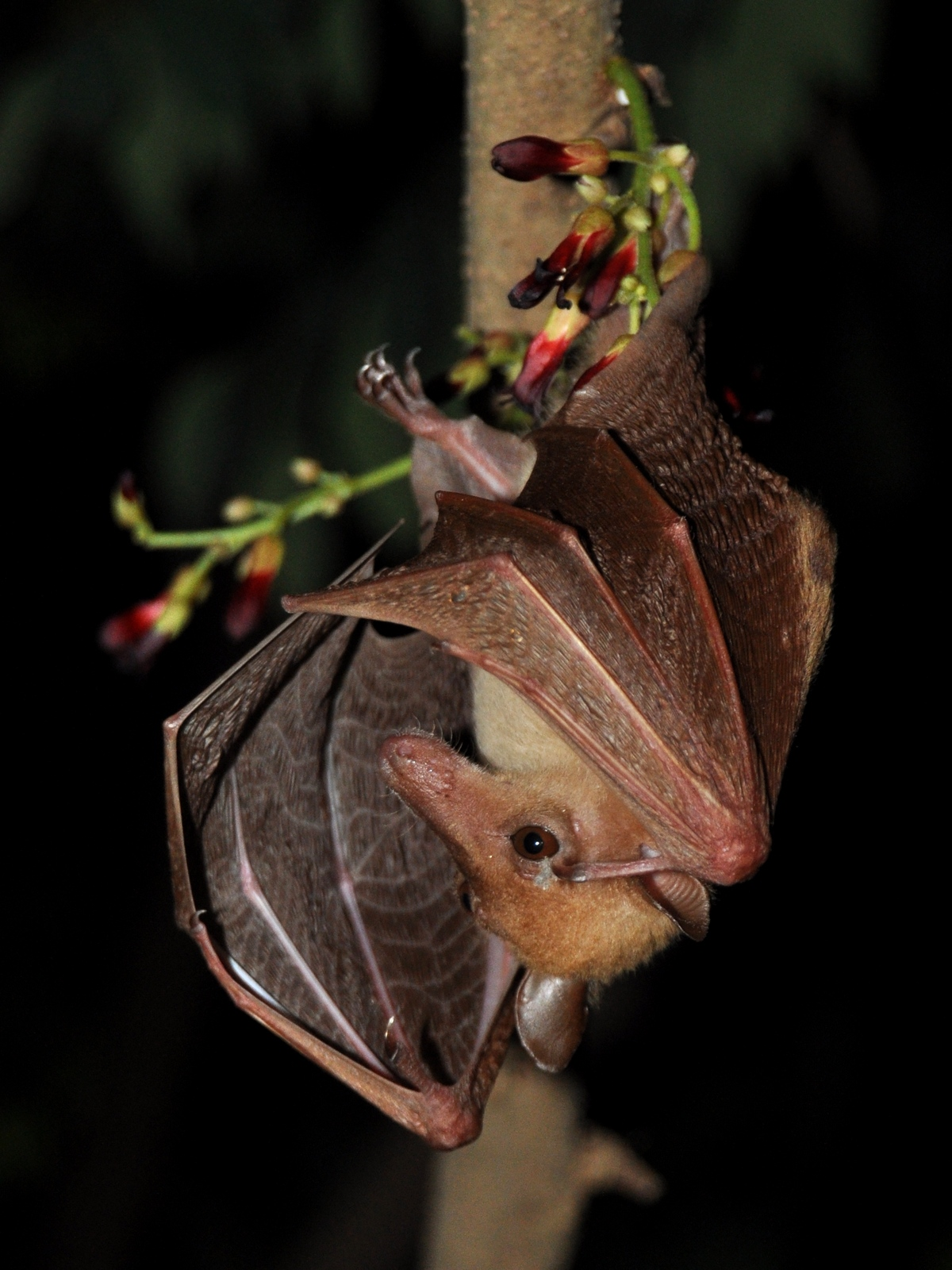

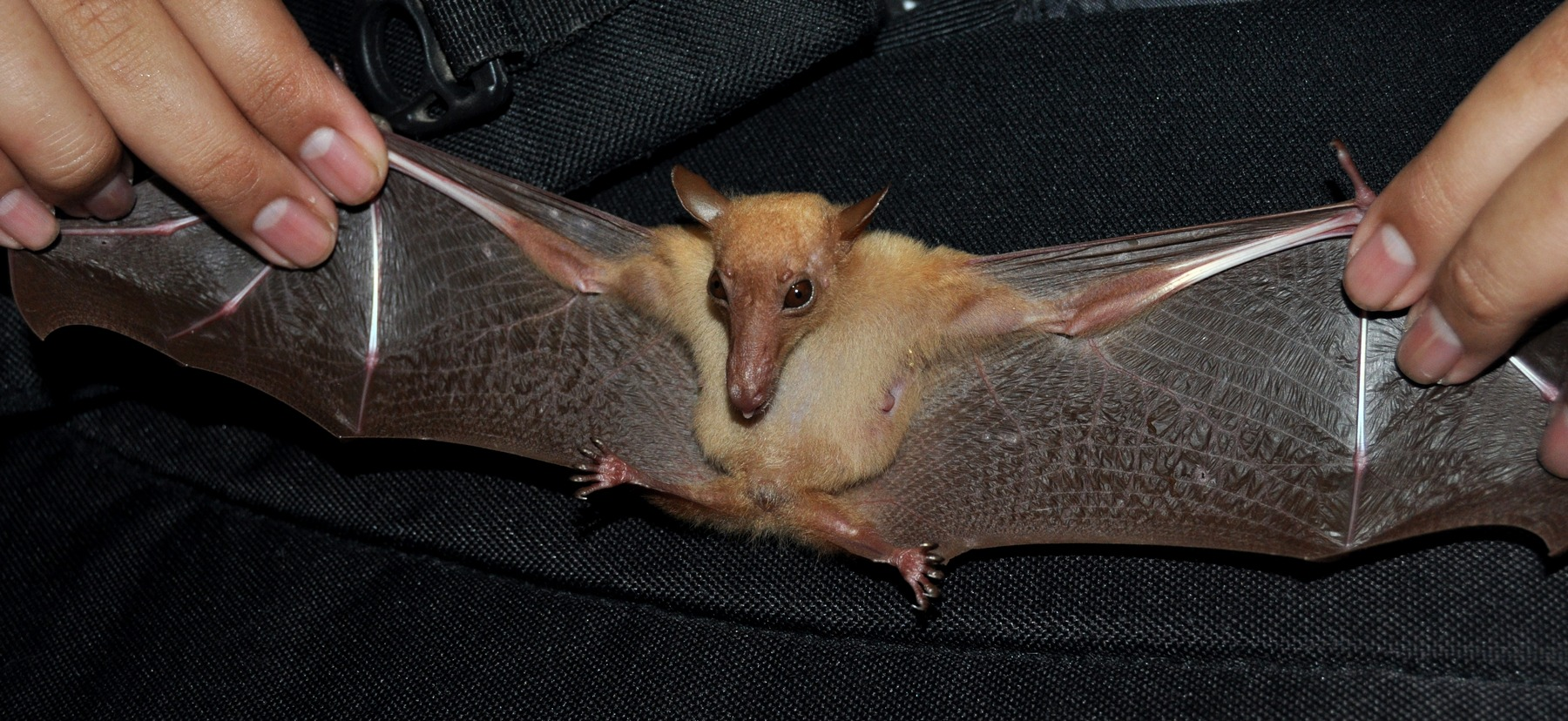

==== Genus: Megaerops ====
Species:

- Tailless fruit bat (Megaerops ecaudatus) LC/lc
- White-collared fruit bat (Ptenochirus wetmorei) VU/vu

==== Genus: Penthetor ====
Species: Dusky fruit bat (Penthetor lucasi) LC/lc

==== Genus: Pteropus ====
Species:

- Black-eared flying fox (Pteropus melanotus) CR/cr
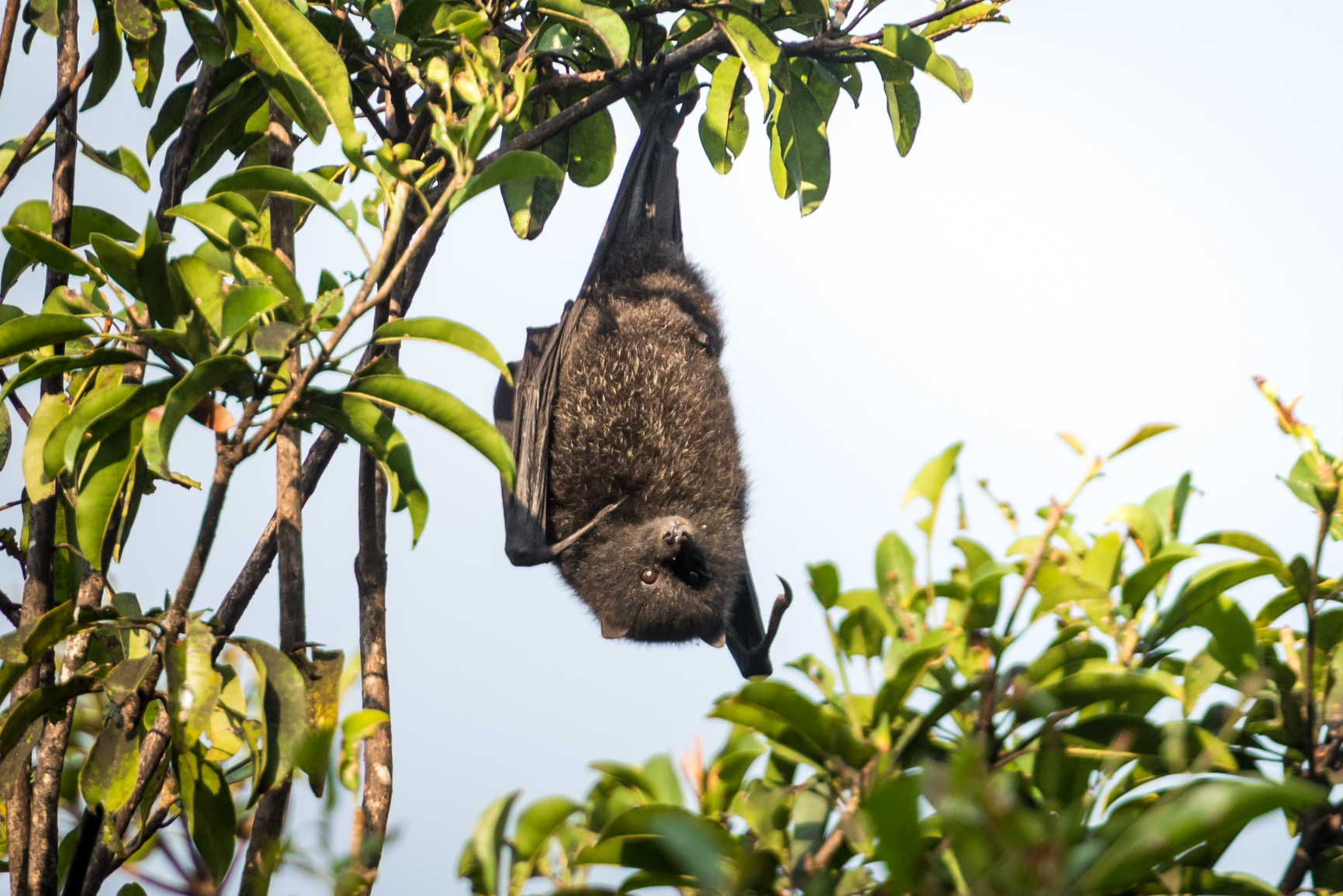
- Large flying fox (Pteropus vampyrus) NT/nt
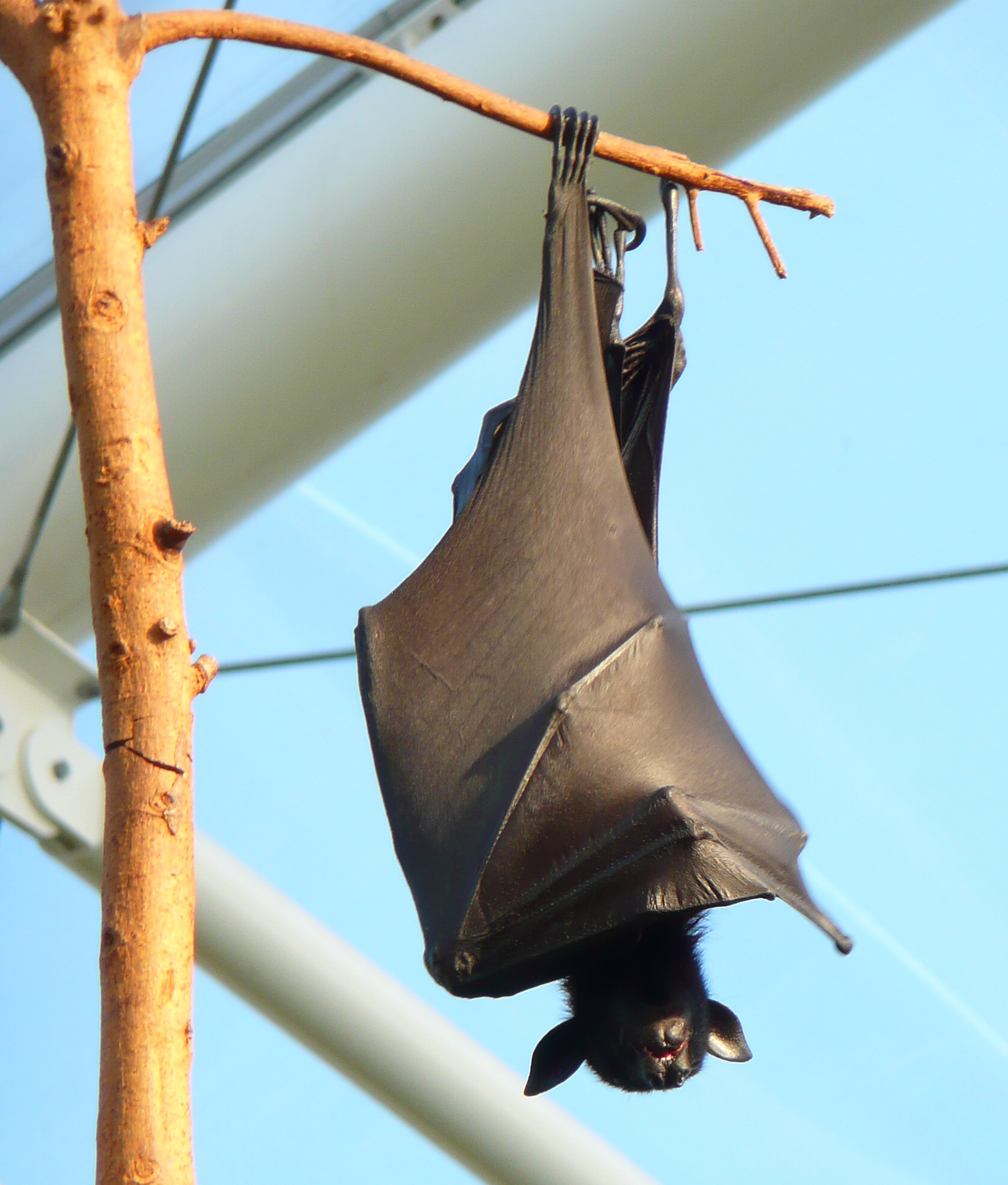

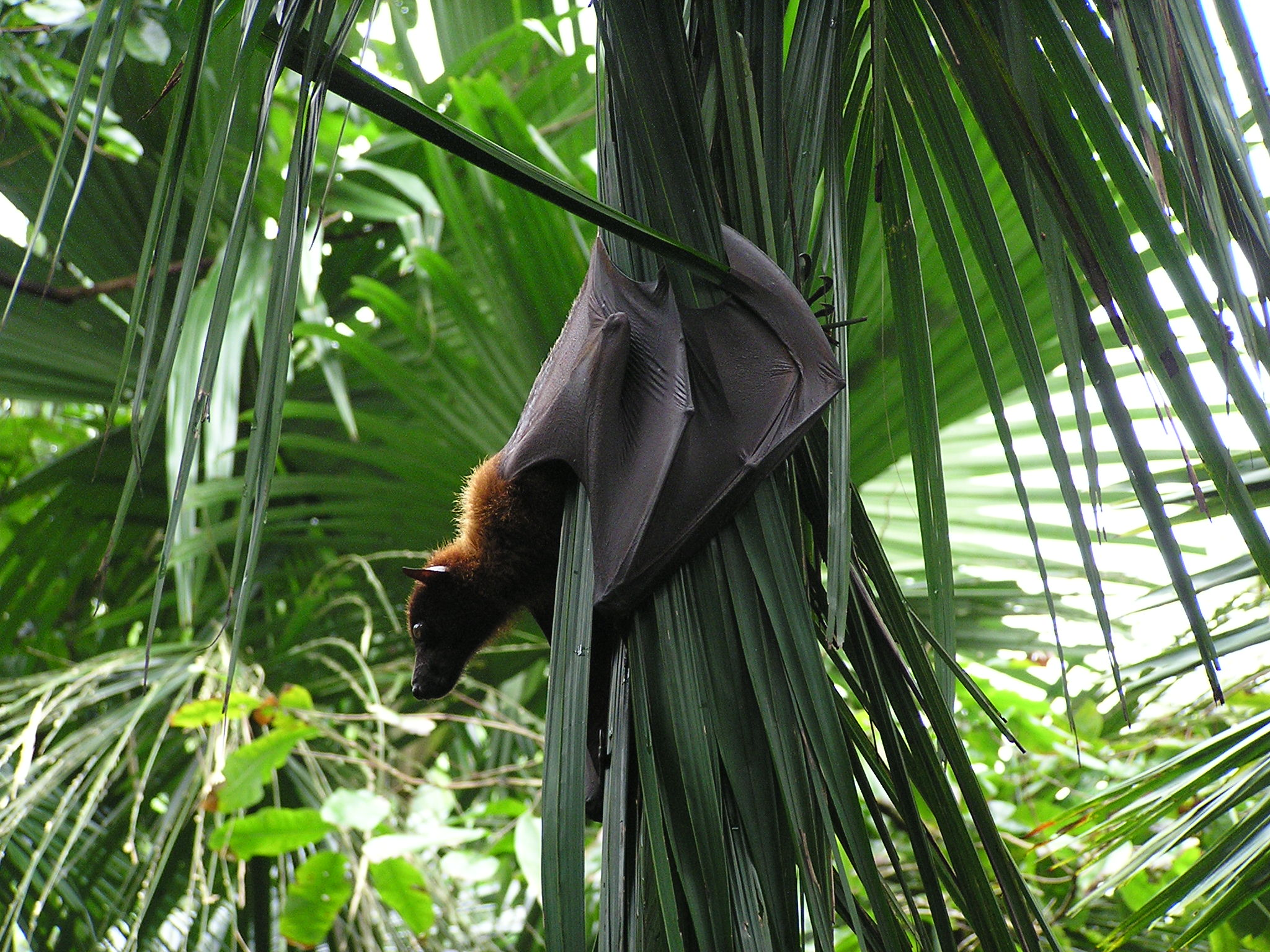

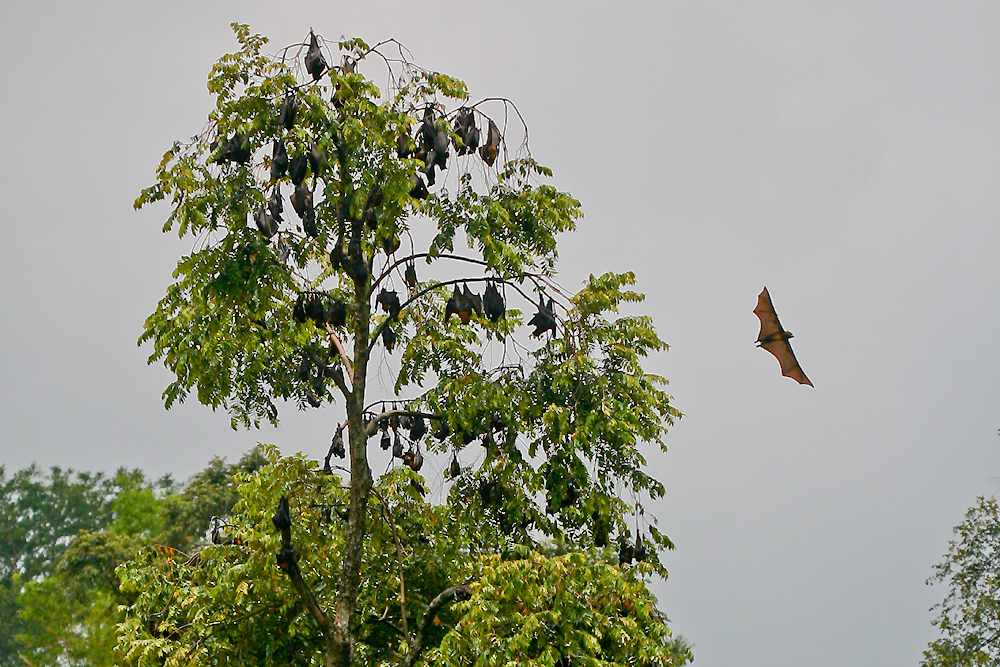

==== Genus: Rousettus ====
Species:

- Geoffroy's rousette (Rousettus amplexicaudatus) LC/lc
- Leschenault's rousette (Rousettus leschenaulti) LC/lc

=== Family: Megadermatidae ===
==== Genus: Megaderma ====
Species: Lesser false vampire bat (Megaderma spasma) LC/lc

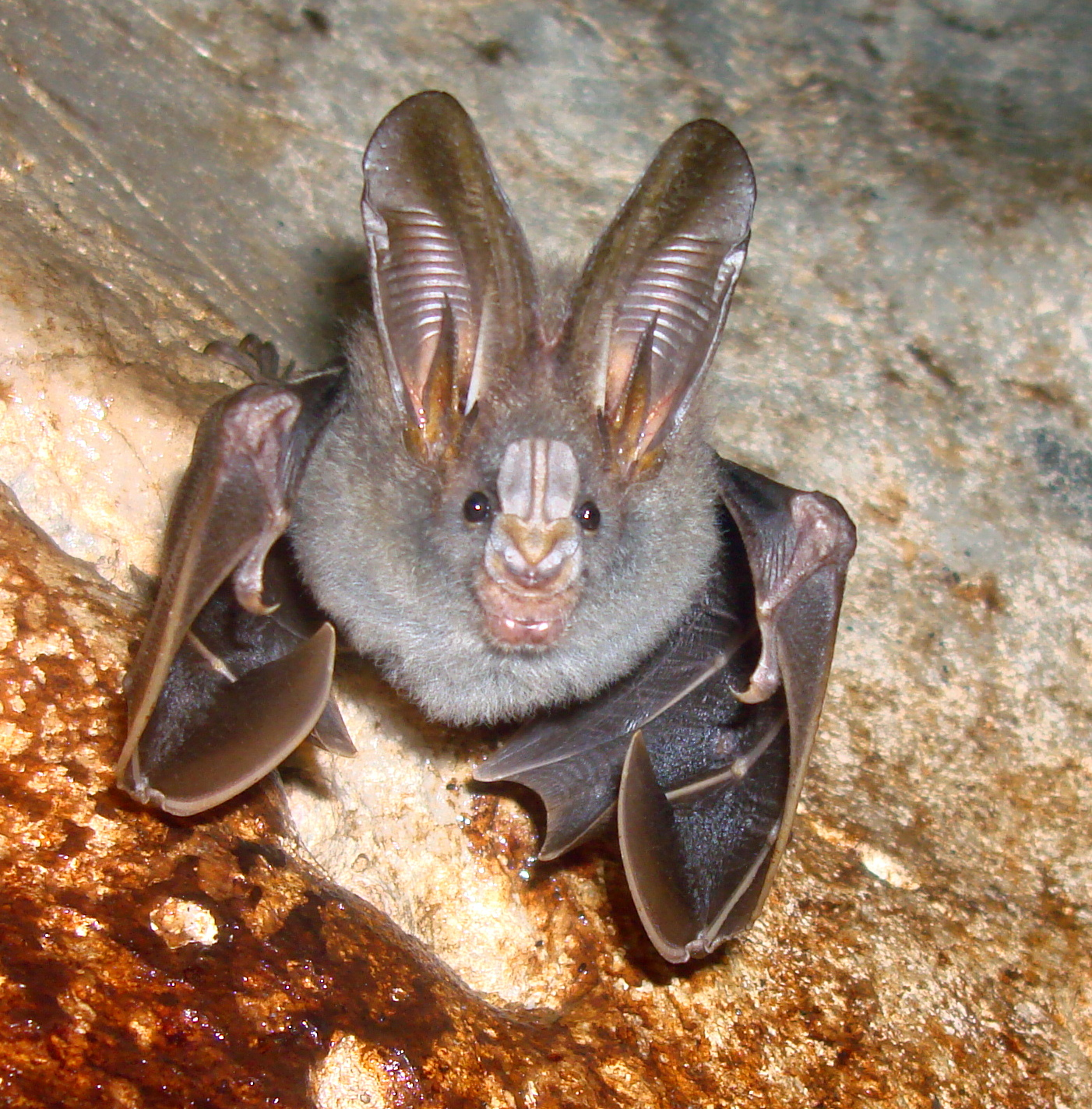

=== Family: Rhinolophidae ===
==== Genus: Rhinolophus ====
Species:

- Acuminate horseshoe bat (Rhinolophus acuminatus) LC/lc
- Arcuate horseshoe bat (Rhinolophus arcuatus) LC/lc
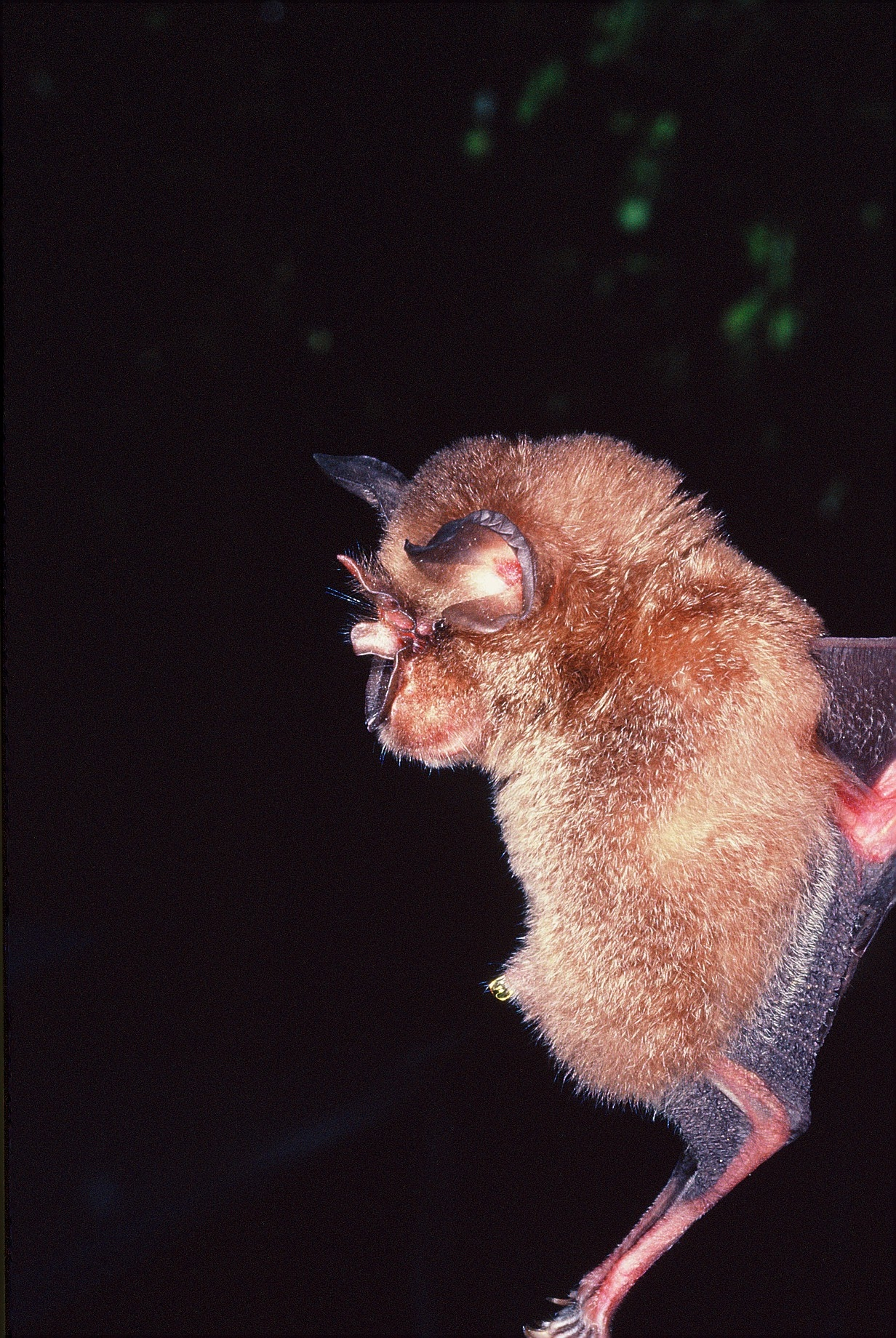
- Blyth's horseshoe bat (Rhinolophus lepidus) LC/lc
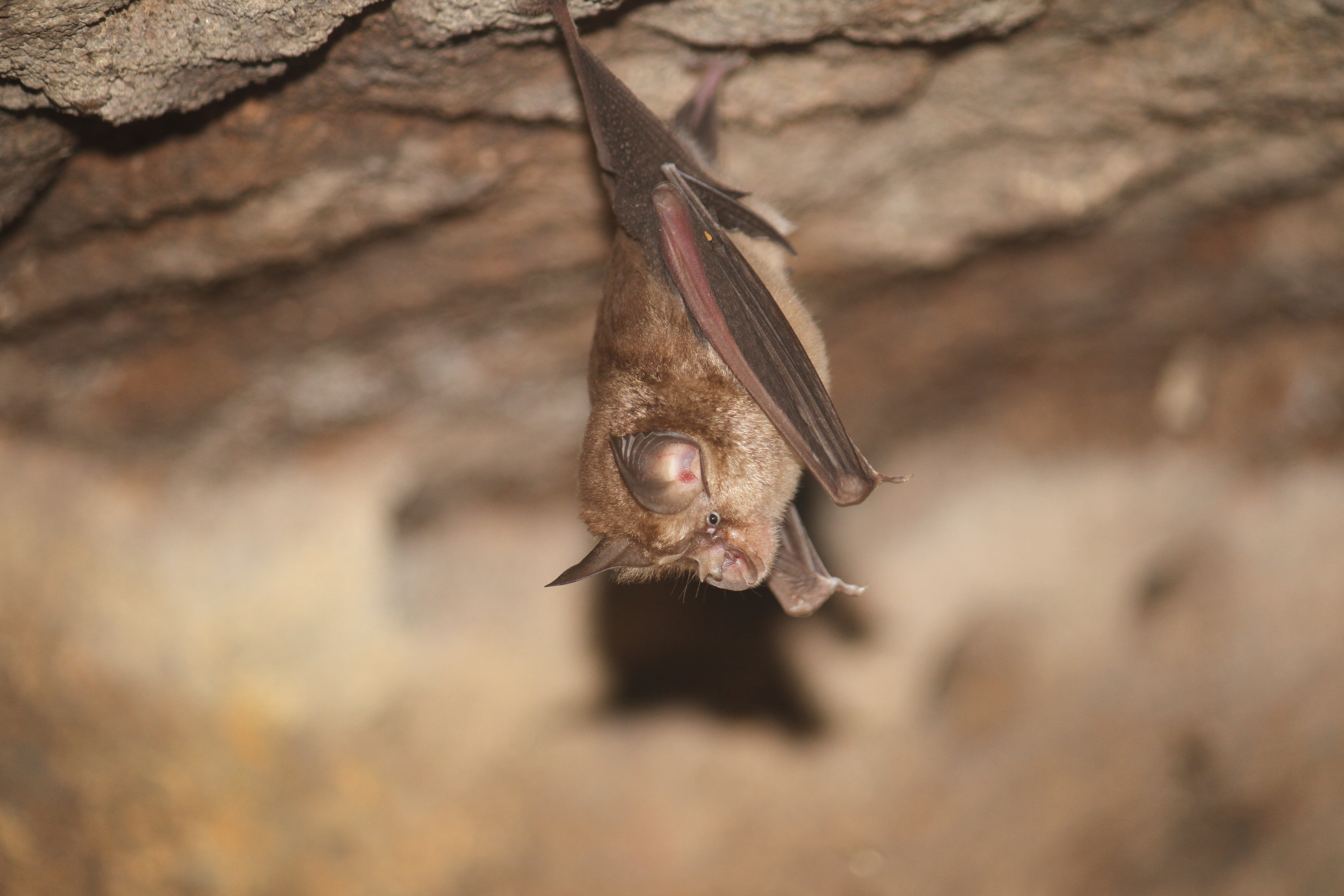
- Woolly horseshoe bat (Rhinolophus luctus) LC/lc
- Big-eared horseshoe bat (Rhinolophus macrotis) LC/lc
- Lesser brown horseshoe bat (Rhinolophus stheno) LC/lc
- Trefoil horseshoe bat (Rhinolophus trifoliatus) LC/lc
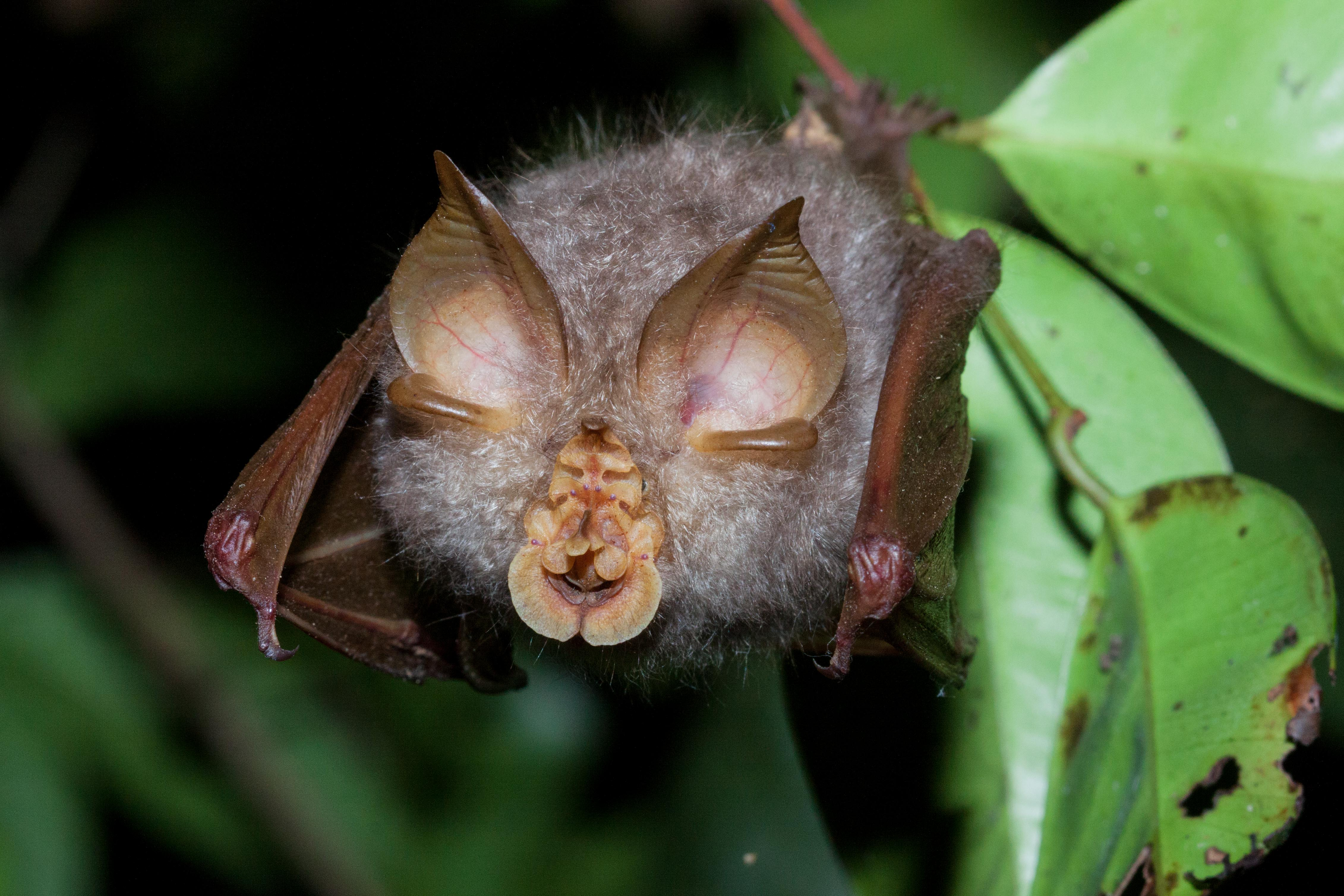

=== Family: Hipposideridae ===
==== Genus: Coelops ====
Species: East Asian tailless leaf-nosed bat (Coelops frithii) LC/lc

==== Genus: Hipposideros ====
Species:

- Dusky roundleaf bat (Hipposideros ater) LC/lc
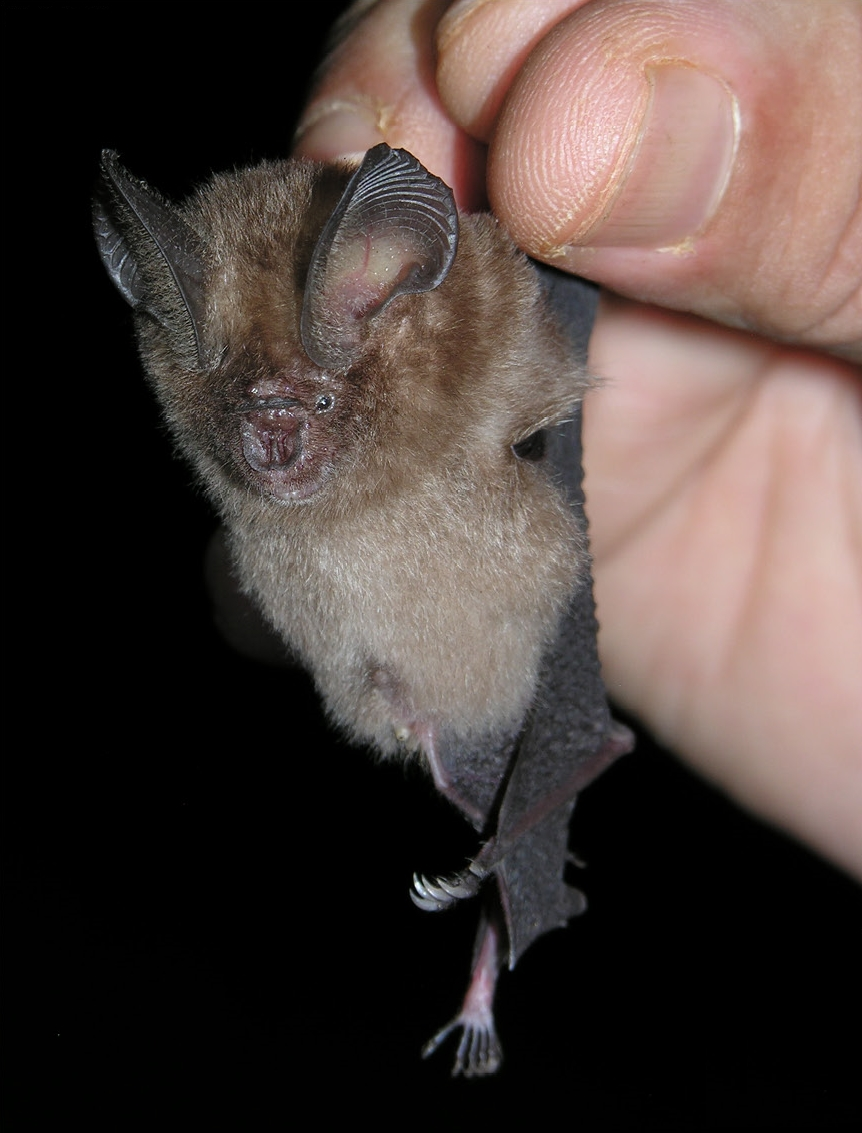
- Bicolored roundleaf bat (Hipposideros bicolor) LC/lc
- Short-headed roundleaf bat (Hipposideros breviceps) VU/vu
- Fawn leaf-nosed bat (Hipposideros cervinus) LC/lc
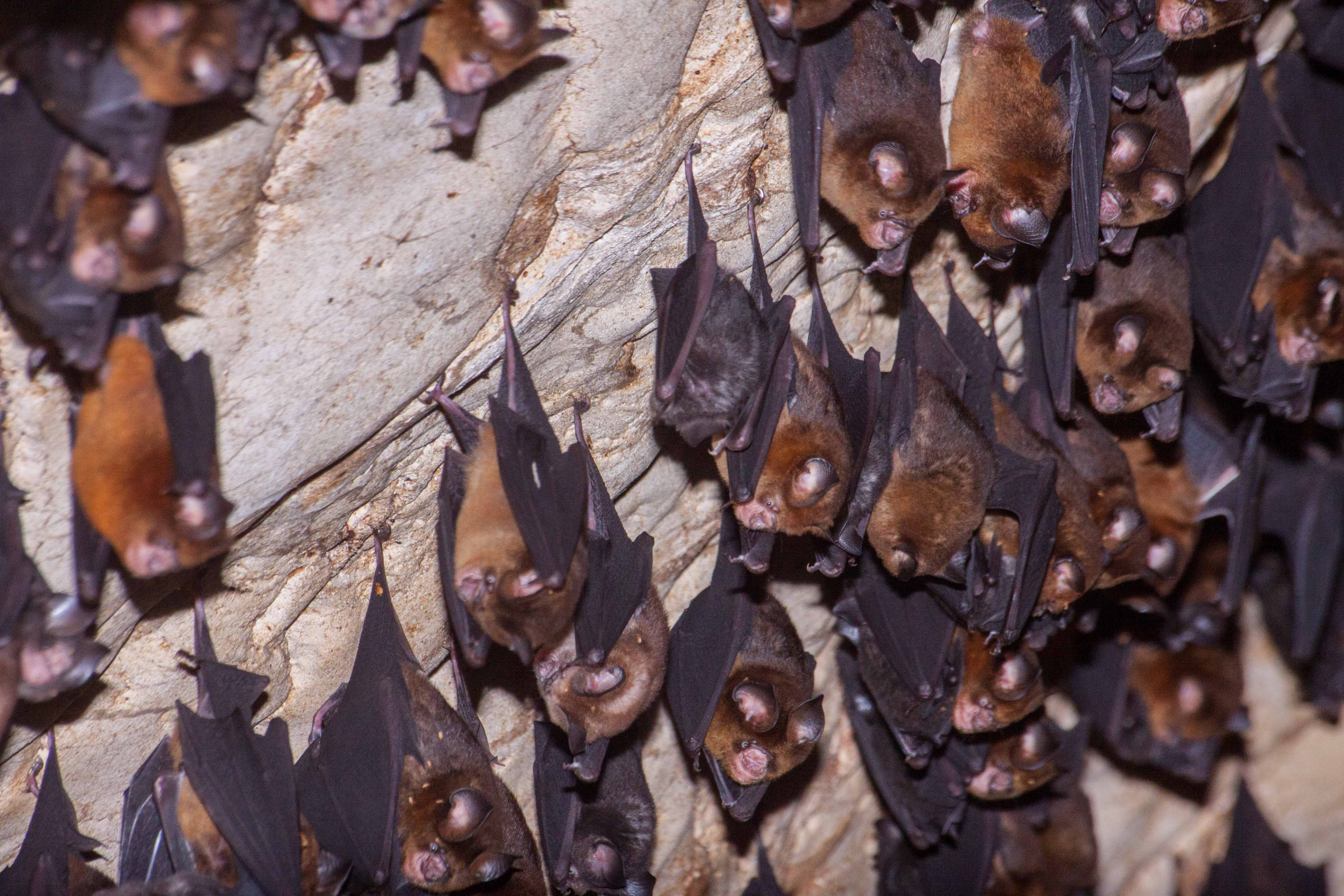

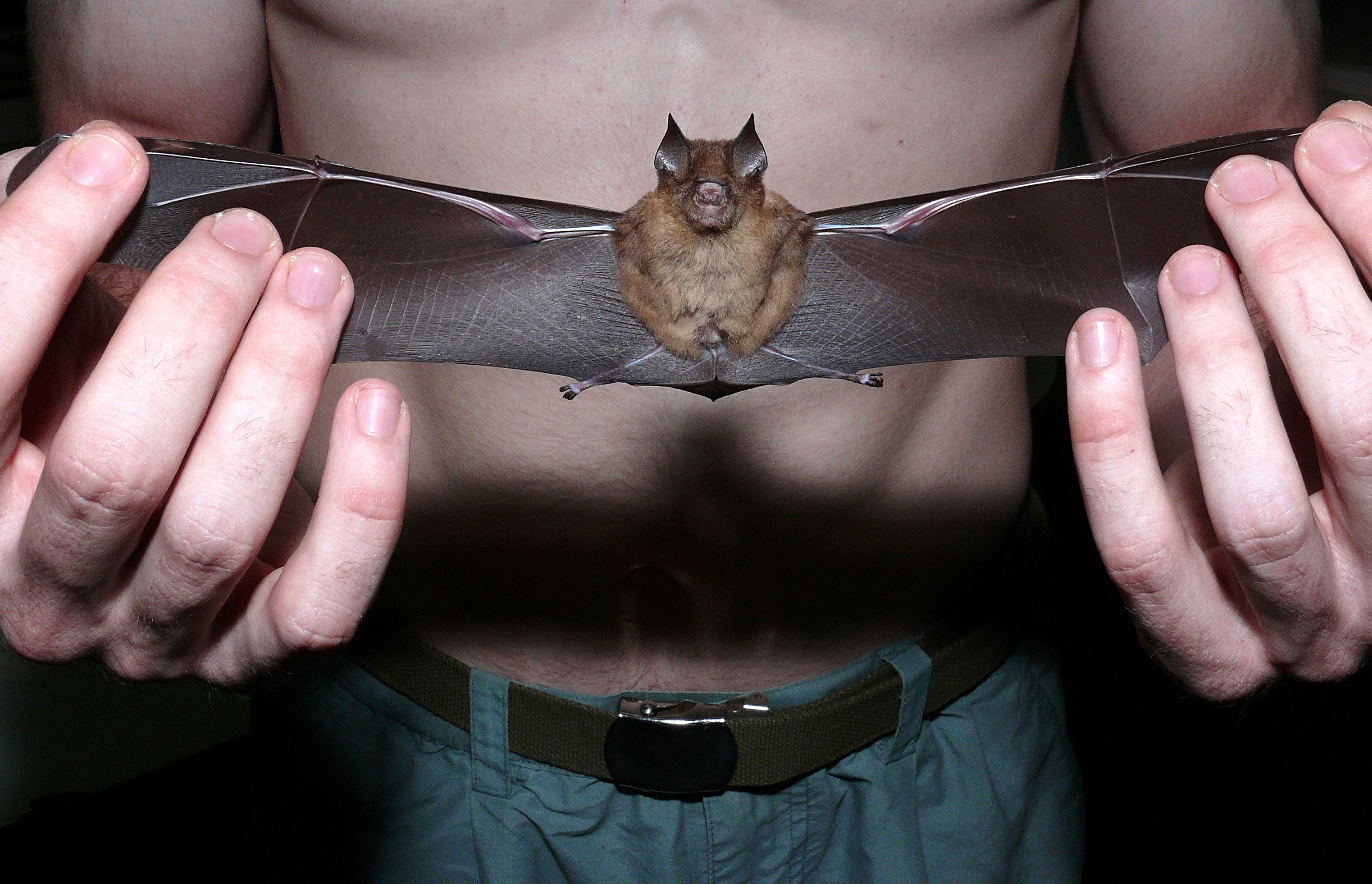
- Ashy roundleaf bat (Hipposideros cineraceus) LC/lc
- Diadem leaf-nosed bat (Hipposideros diadema) LC/lc
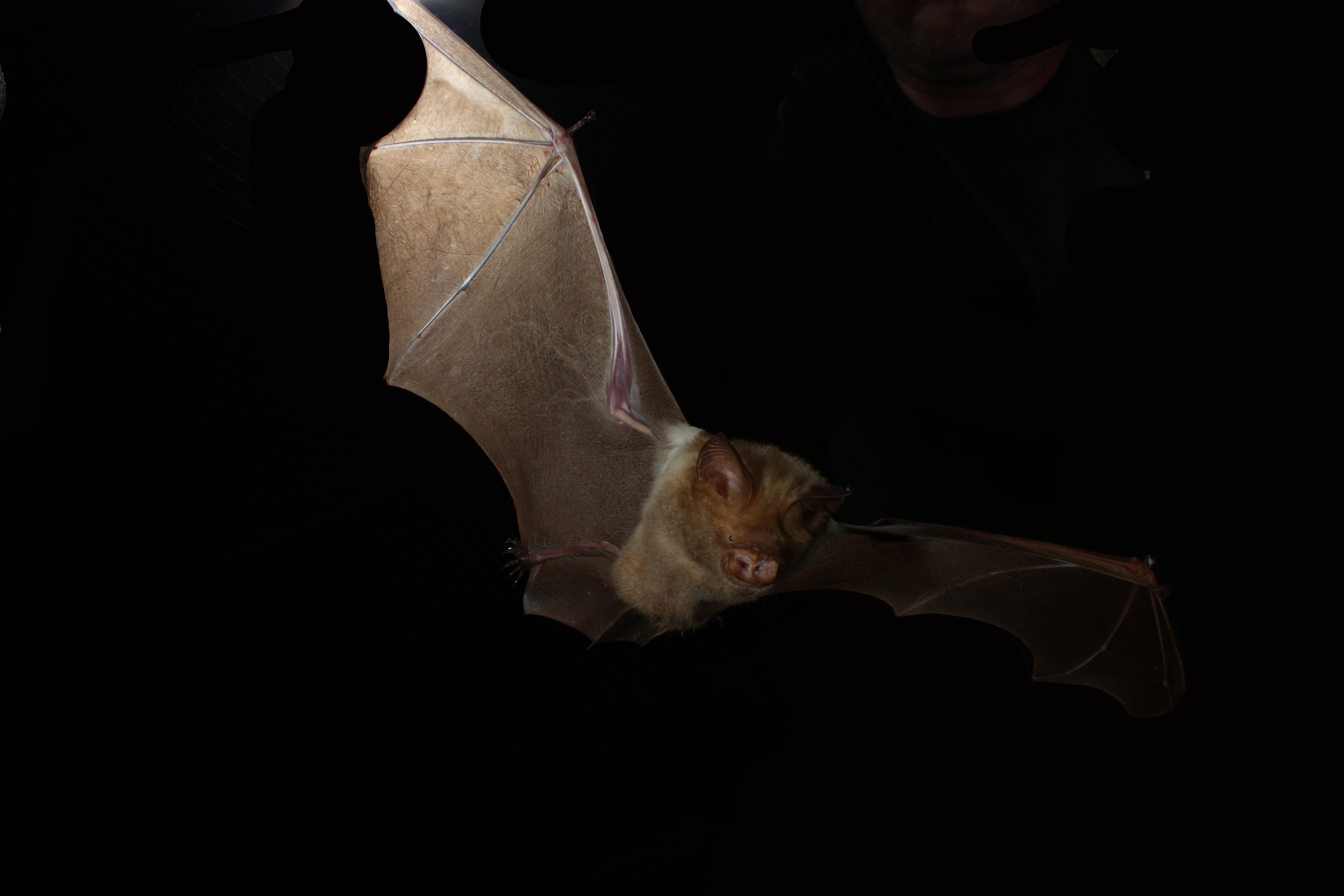
- Borneo roundleaf bat (Hipposideros doriae) NT/nt
- Cantor's roundleaf bat (Hipposideros galeritus) LC/lc
- Intermediate roundleaf bat (Hipposideros larvatus) LC/lc
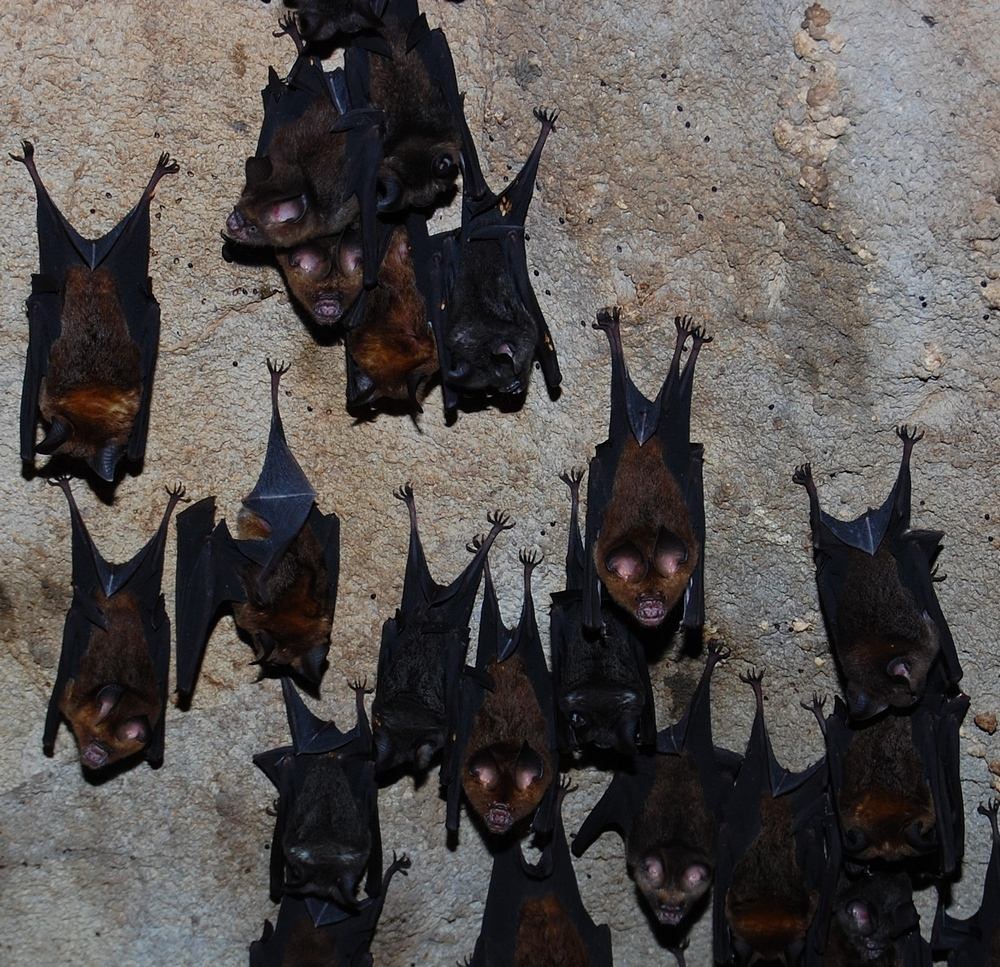

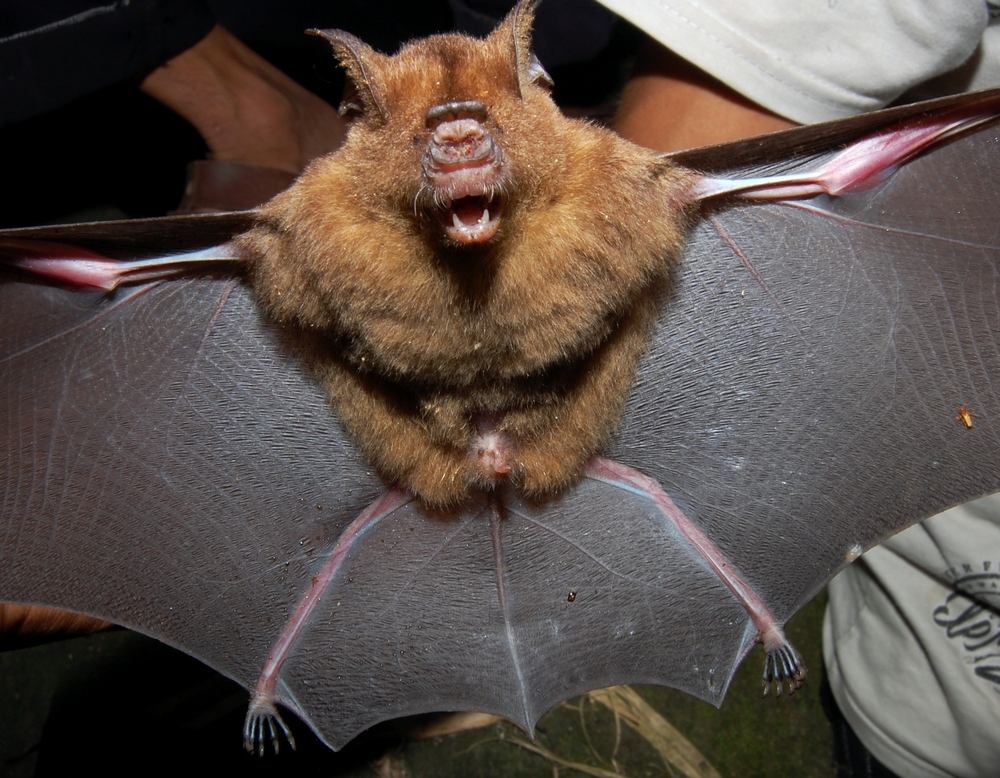
- Orbiculus leaf-nosed bat (Hipposideros orbiculus) EN/en

=== Family: Emballonuridae ===
==== Genus: Emballonura ====
Species: Lesser sheath-tailed bat (Emballonura monticola) LC/lc

==== Genus: Saccolaimus ====
Species: Naked-rumped pouched bat (Saccolaimus saccolaimus) LC/lc

==== Genus: Taphozous ====
Species:

- Long-winged tomb bat (Taphozous longimanus) LC/lc
- Black-bearded tomb bat (Taphozous melanopogon) LC/lc
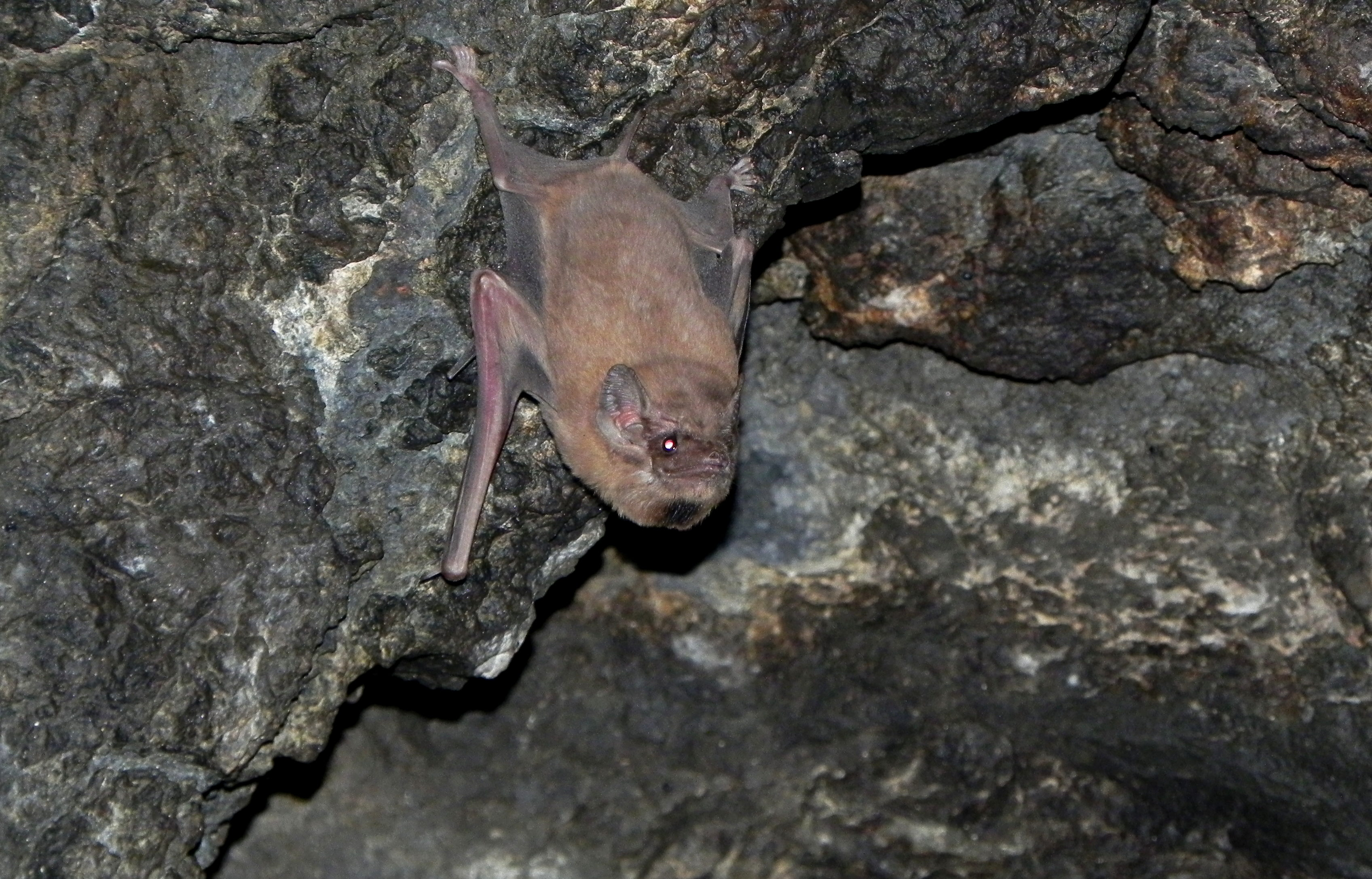

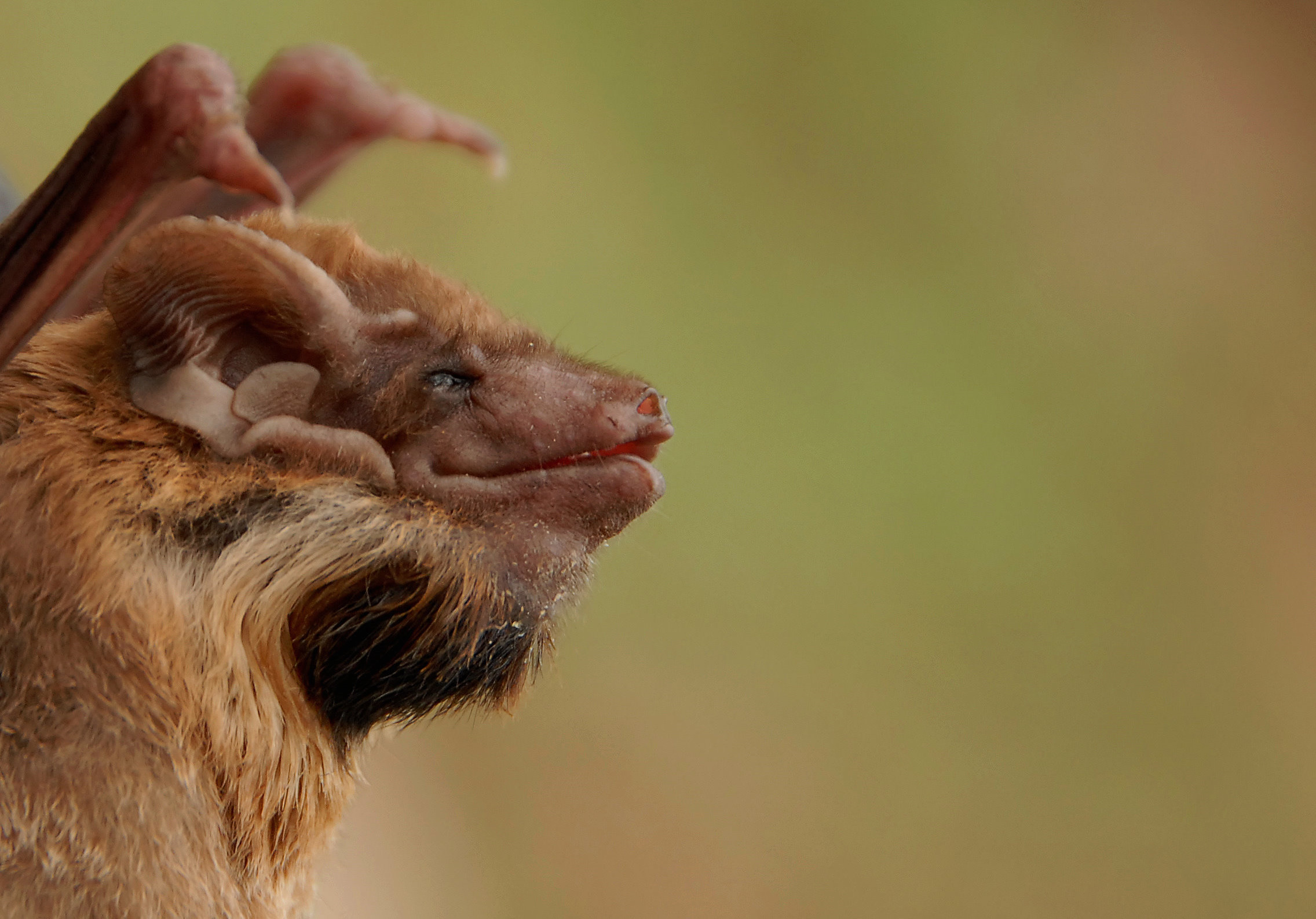

=== Family: Nycteridae ===
==== Genus: Nycteris ====
Species: Malayan slit-faced bat (Nycteris tragata) LC/lc

=== Family: Molossidae ===
==== Genus: Chaerephon ====
Species: Northern free-tailed bat (Chaerephon johorensis) VU/vu

==== Genus: Cheiromeles ====
Species: Hairless bat (Cheiromeles torquatus) LC/lc

==== Genus: Mops ====
Species: Malayan free-tailed bat (Mops mops) LC/lc

==== Genus: Mormopterus ====
Species: Sumatran mastiff bat (Mormopterus doriae) DD/dd

=== Family: Vespertilionidae ===
==== Genus: Glischropus ====
Species: Common thick-thumbed bat (Glischropus tylopus) LC/lc

==== Genus: Harpiocephalus ====
Species: Lesser hairy-winged bat (Harpiocephalus harpia) LC/lc

==== Genus: Hypsugo ====
Species: Big-eared pipistrelle (Hypsugo macrotis) DD/dd

==== Genus: Kerivoula ====
Species:

- Hardwicke's woolly bat (Kerivoula hardwickii) LC/lc
- Papillose woolly bat (Kerivoula papillosa) LC/lc
- Clear-winged woolly bat (Kerivoula pellucida) LC/lc
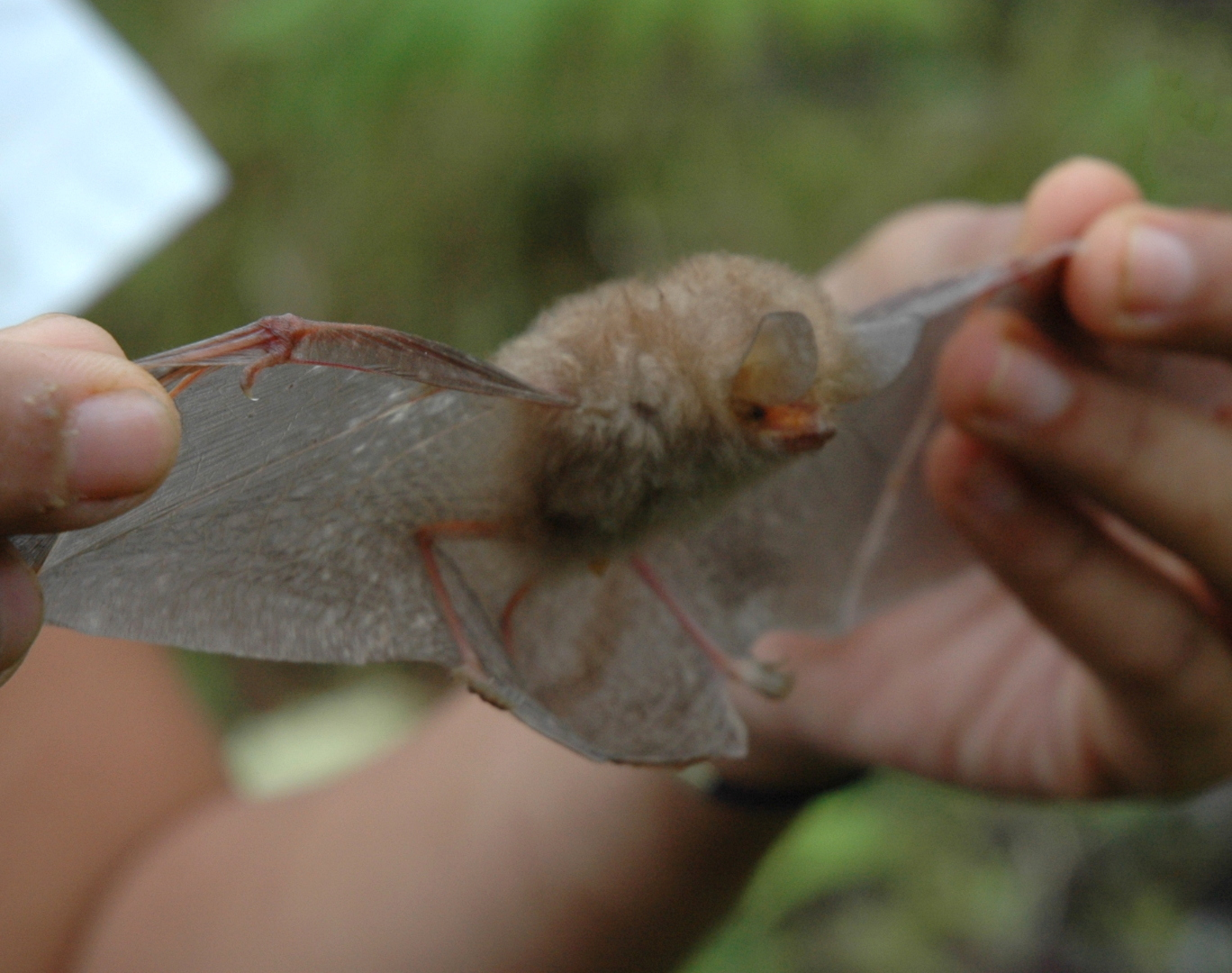
- Species: Painted bat (Kerivoula picta) LC/lc

==== Genus: Miniopterus ====
Species: Small bent-winged bat (Miniopterus pusillus) LC/lc

==== Genus: Murina ====
Species:

- Round-eared tube-nosed bat (Murina cyclotis) LC/lc
- Brown tube-nosed bat (Murina suilla) LC/lc

==== Genus: Myotis ====
Species:

- Peters's myotis (Myotis ater) LC/lc
- Hodgson's bat (Myotis formosus) LC/lc
- Lesser large-footed bat (Myotis hasseltii) LC/lc
- Herman's myotis (Myotis hermani) DD/dd

==== Genus: Phoniscus ====
Species: Groove-toothed bat (Phoniscus atrox) NT/nt

==== Genus: Pipistrellus ====
Species:

- Narrow-winged pipistrelle (Pipistrellus stenopterus) LC/lc
- Least pipistrelle (Pipistrellus tenuis) LC/lc
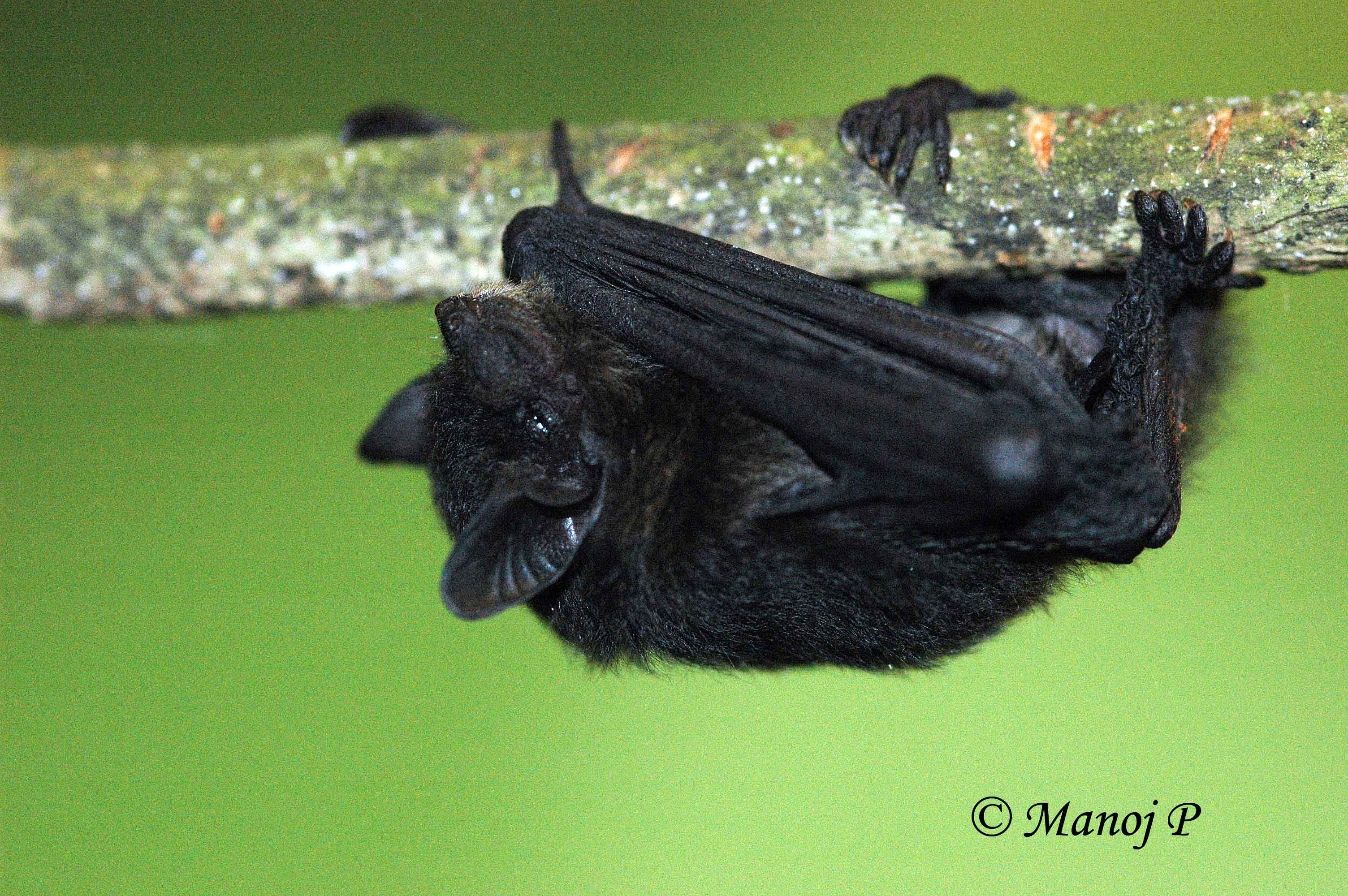

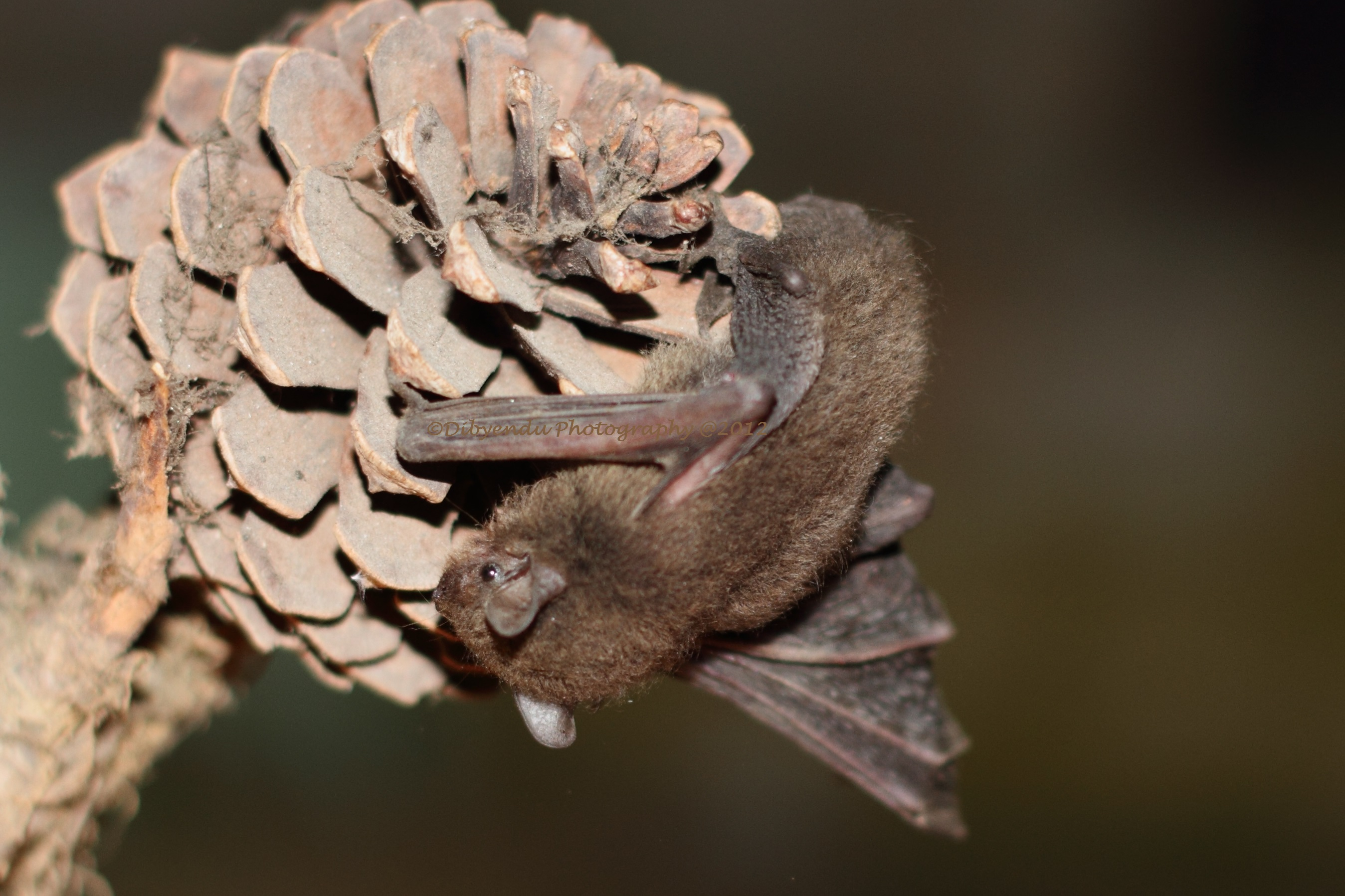

==== Genus: Tylonycteris ====
Species:

- Lesser bamboo bat (Tylonycteris pachypus) LC/lc
- Greater bamboo bat (Tylonycteris robustula) LC/lc

== Order: Pholidota ==
=== Family: Manidae ===
==== Genus: Manis ====
Species: Sunda pangolin (Manis javanica) CR/cr

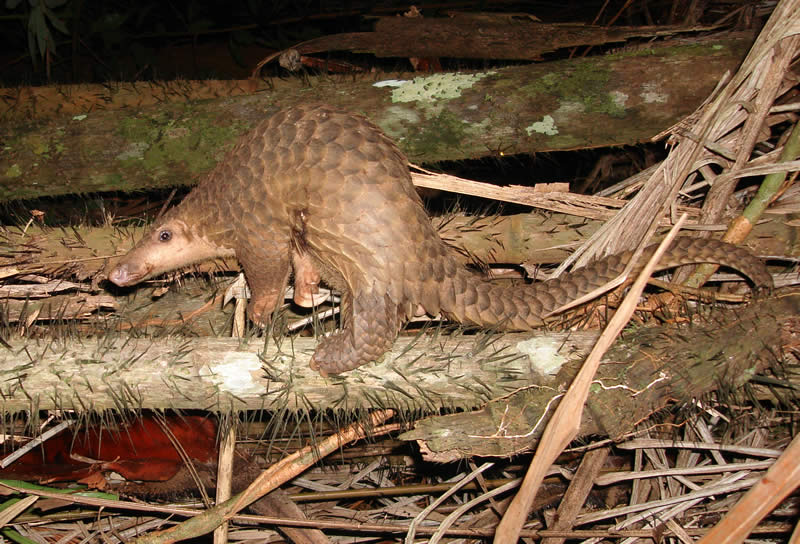

== Order: Carnivora ==
=== Family: Felidae ===
==== Genus: Catopuma ====
Species: Asian golden cat (Catopuma temminckii) NT/

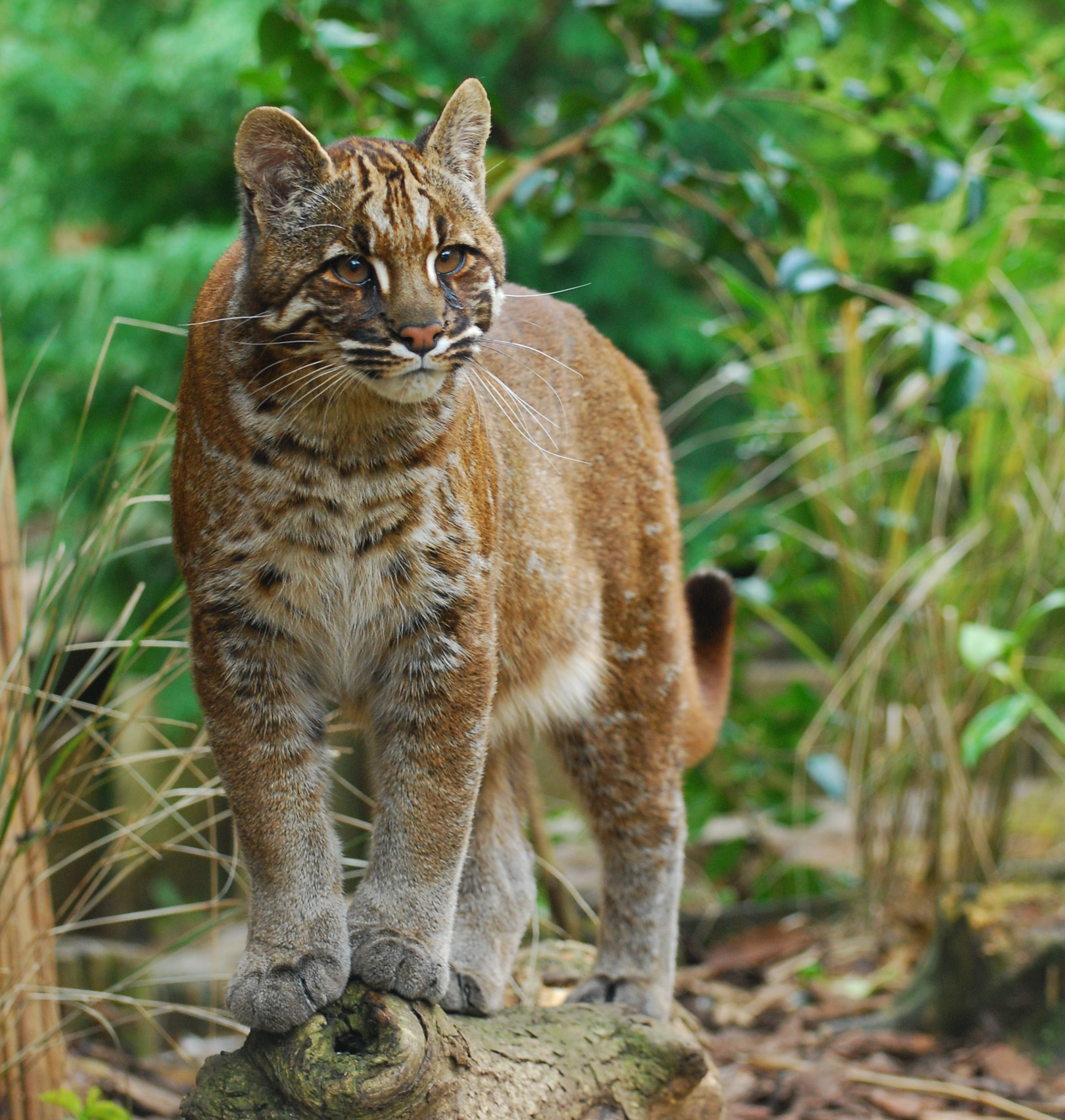

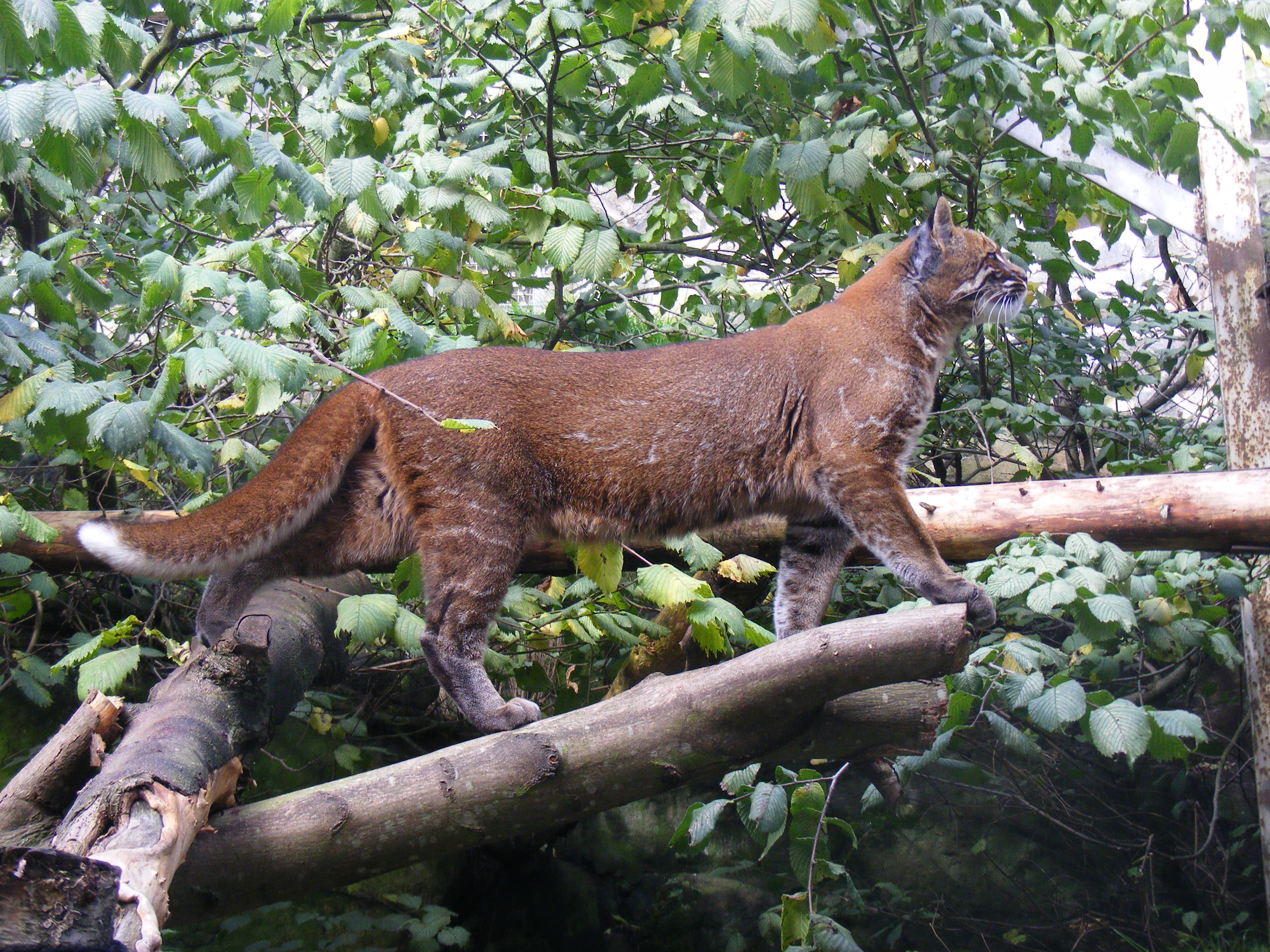

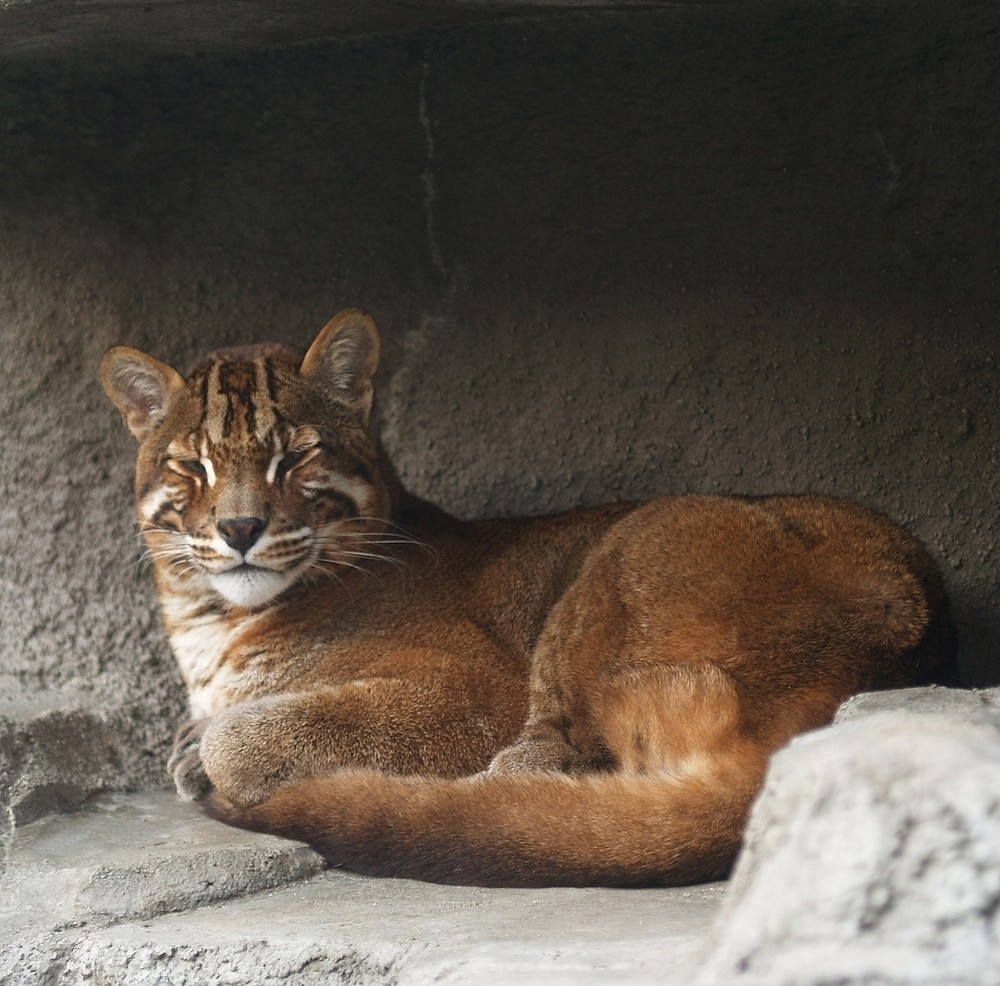

==== Genus: Pardofelis ====
Species: Marbled cat (Pardofelis marmorata) VU/

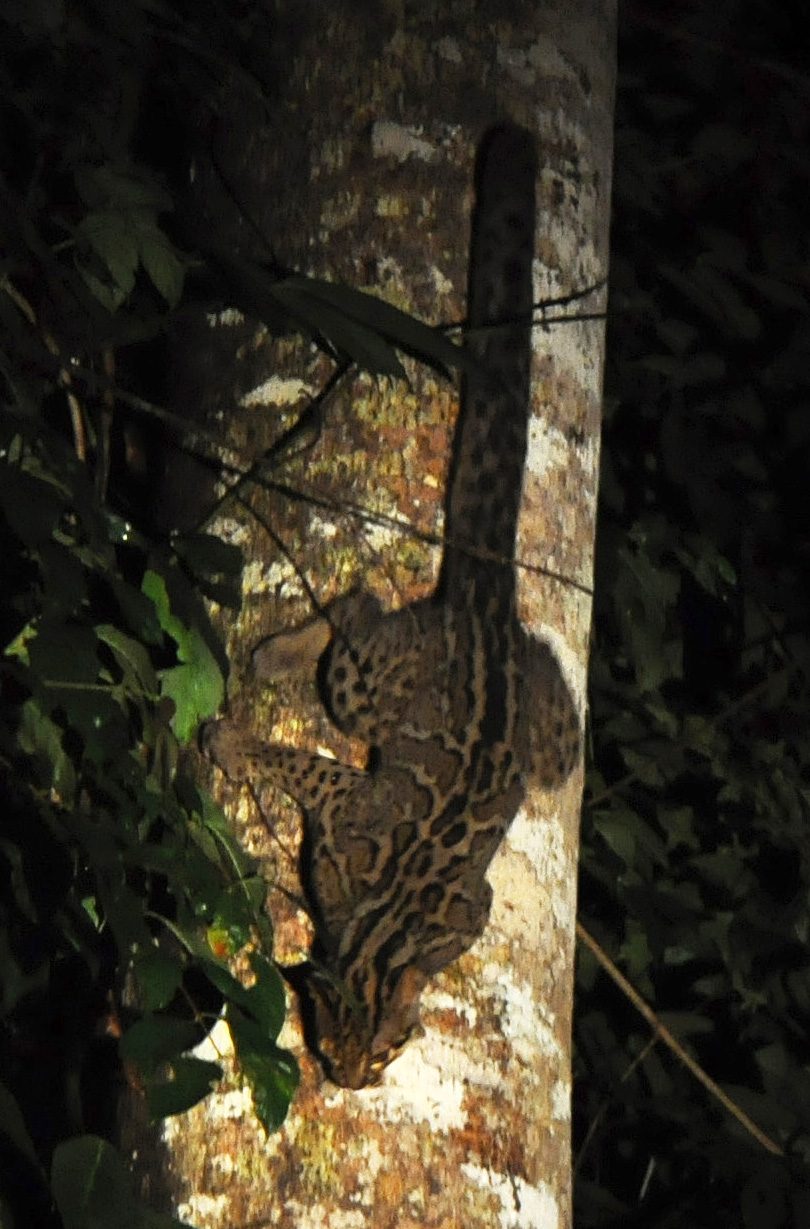

==== Genus: Neofelis ====
Species: Sunda clouded leopard (Neofelis diardi) VU/

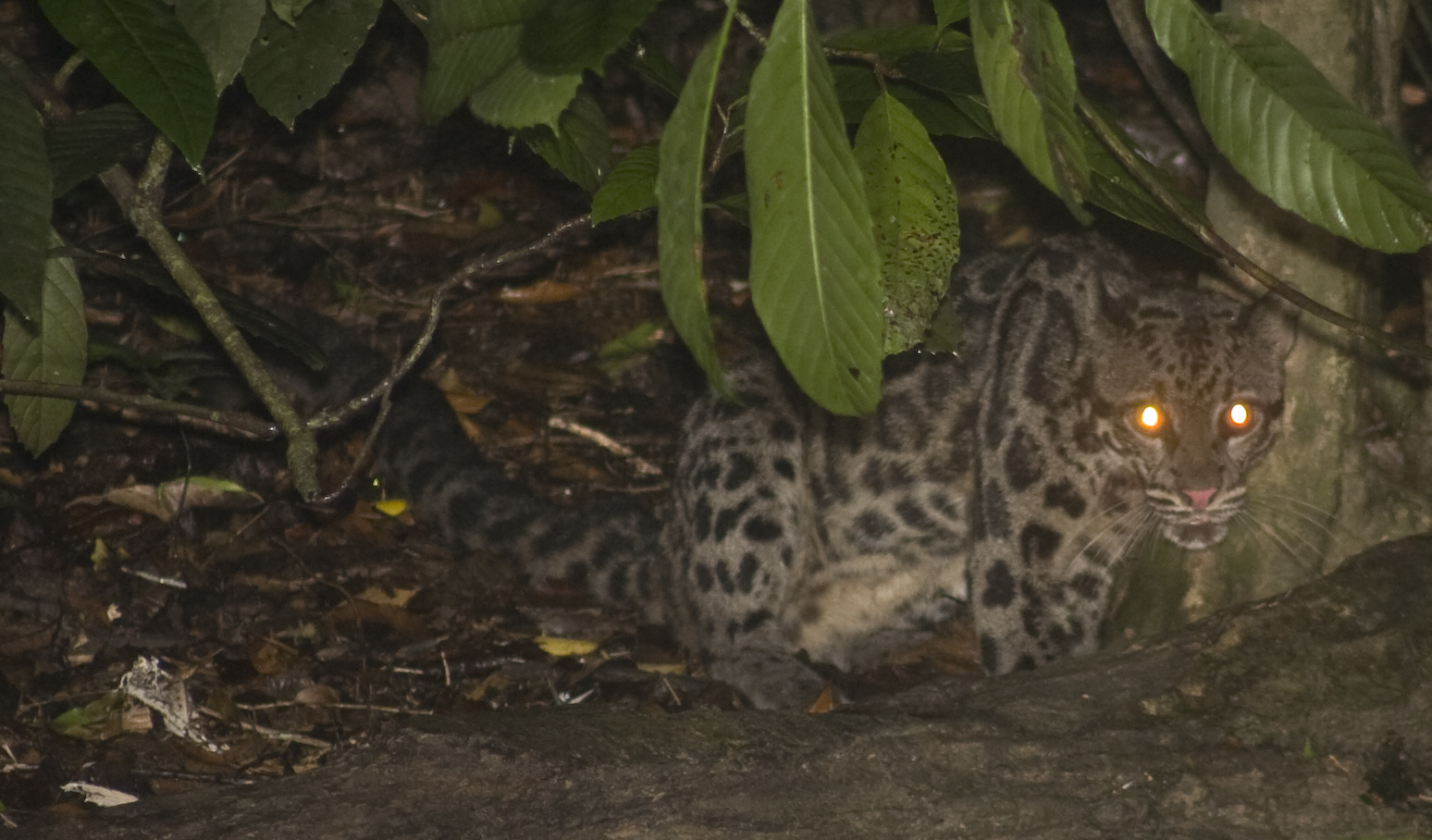

==== Genus: Panthera ====
Species: Tiger (Panthera tigris) EN

Subspecies: Sumatran tiger (Panthera tigris sumatrae) CR

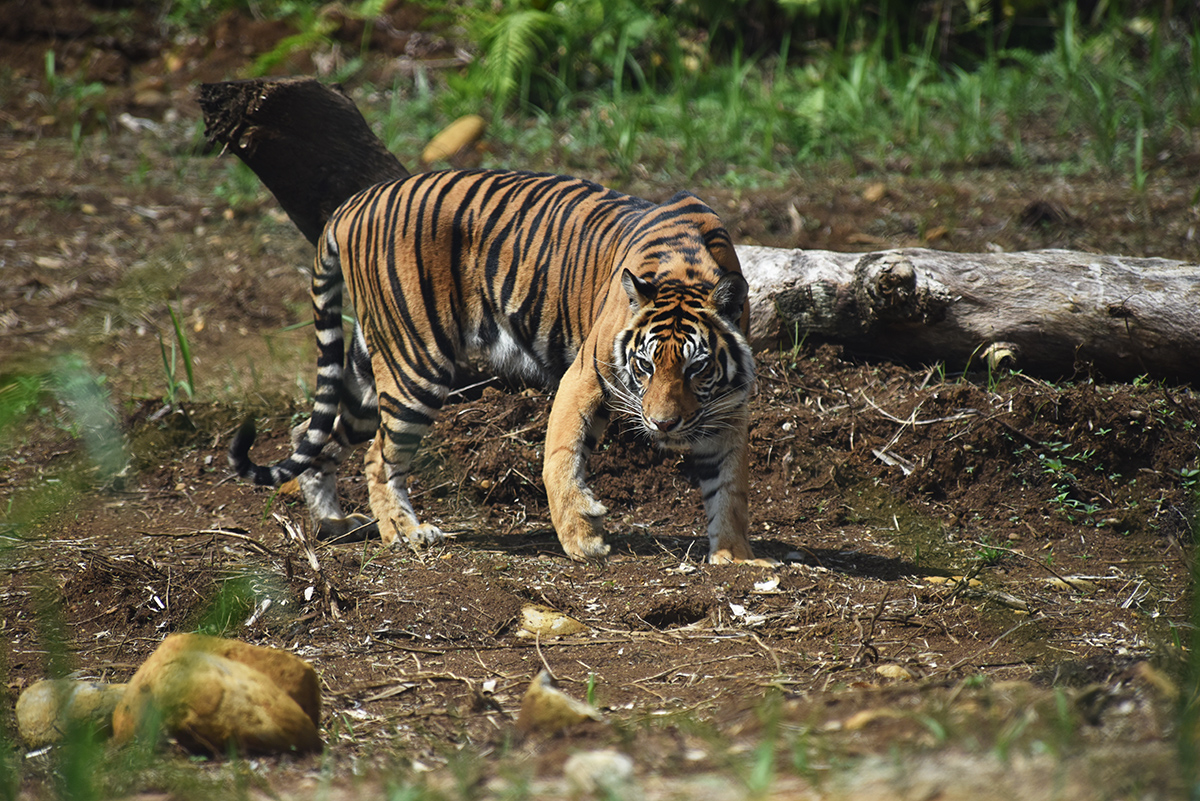

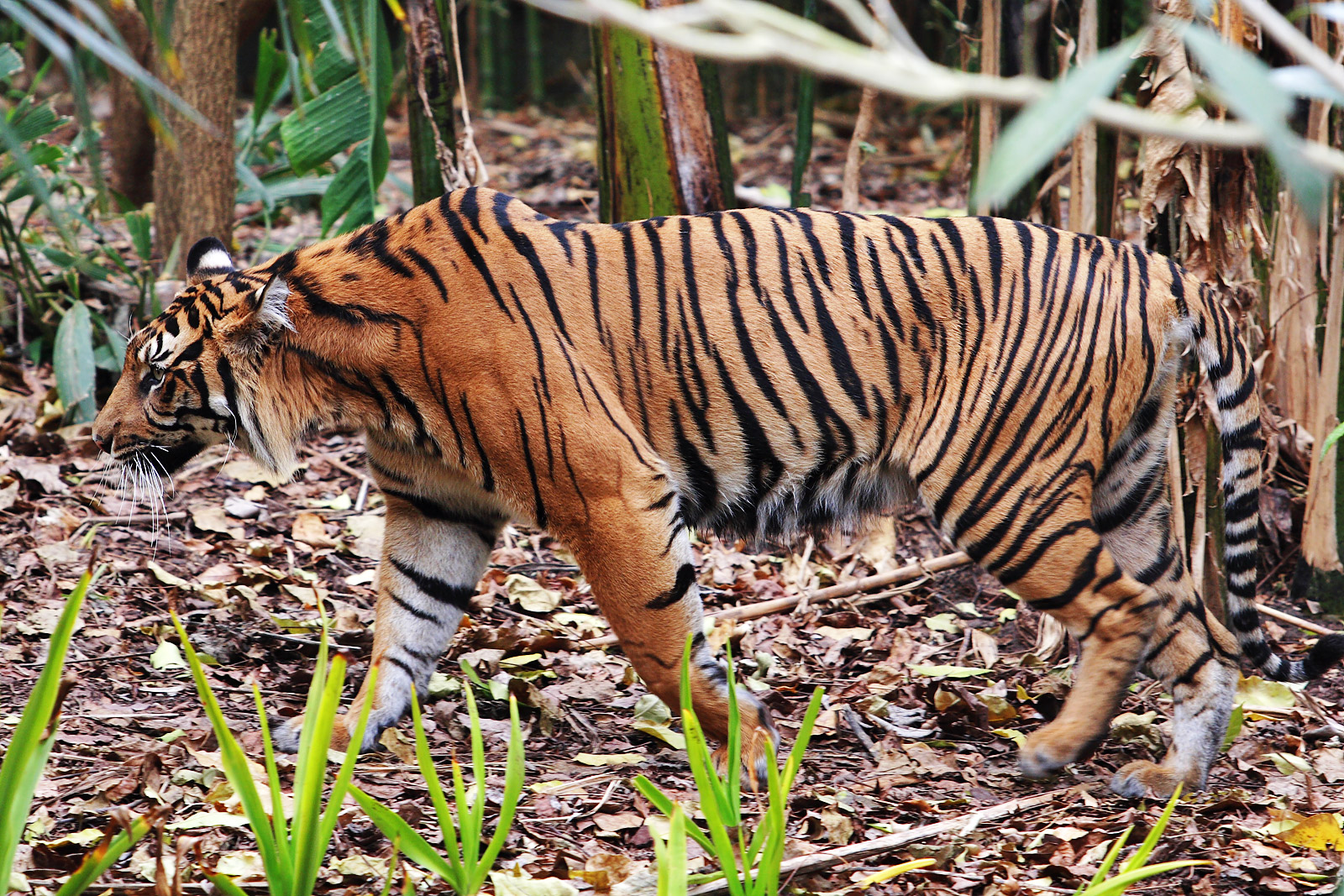

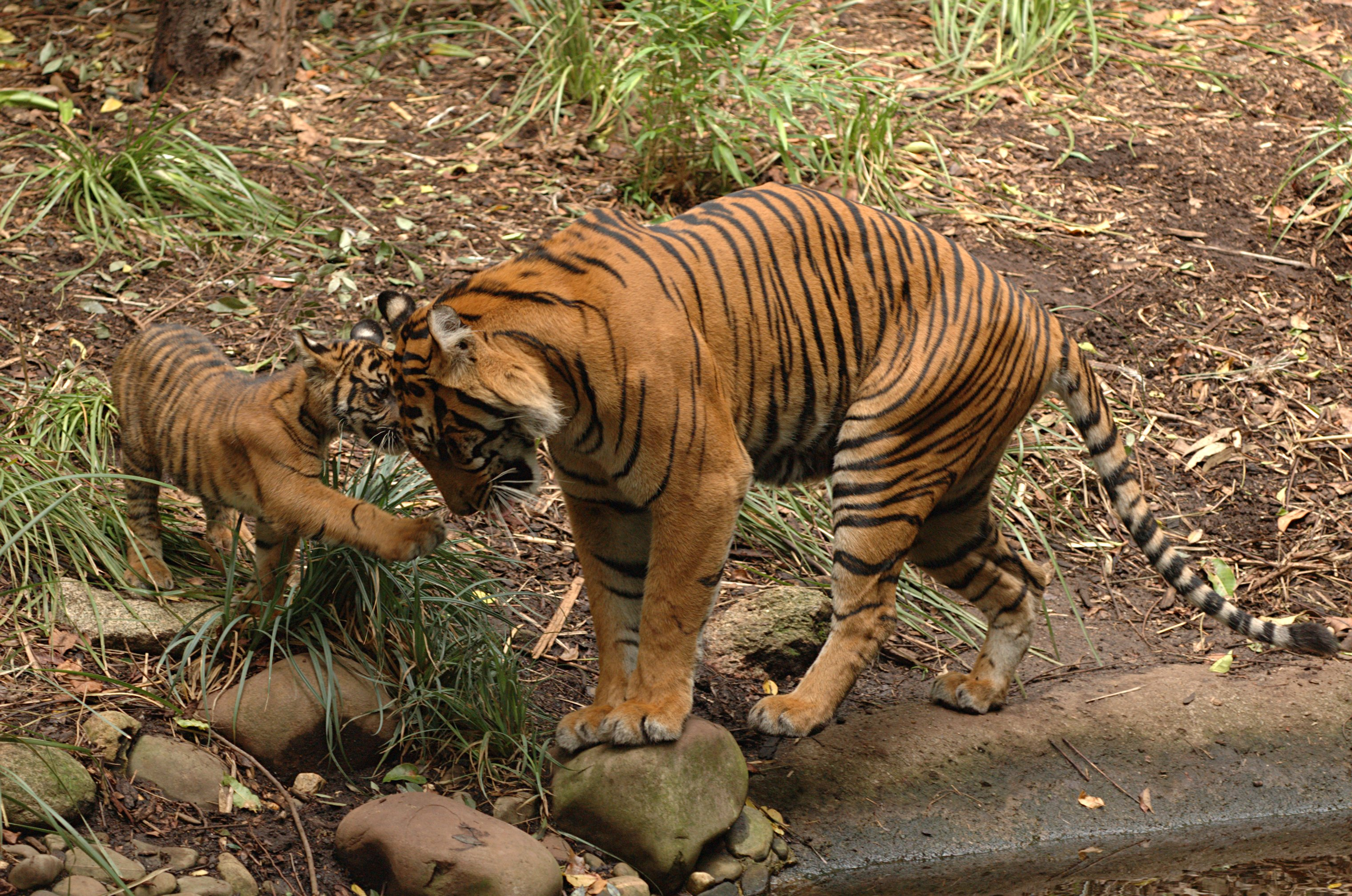

==== Genus: Prionailurus ====
Species:

- Sunda leopard cat (Prionailurus javanensis)
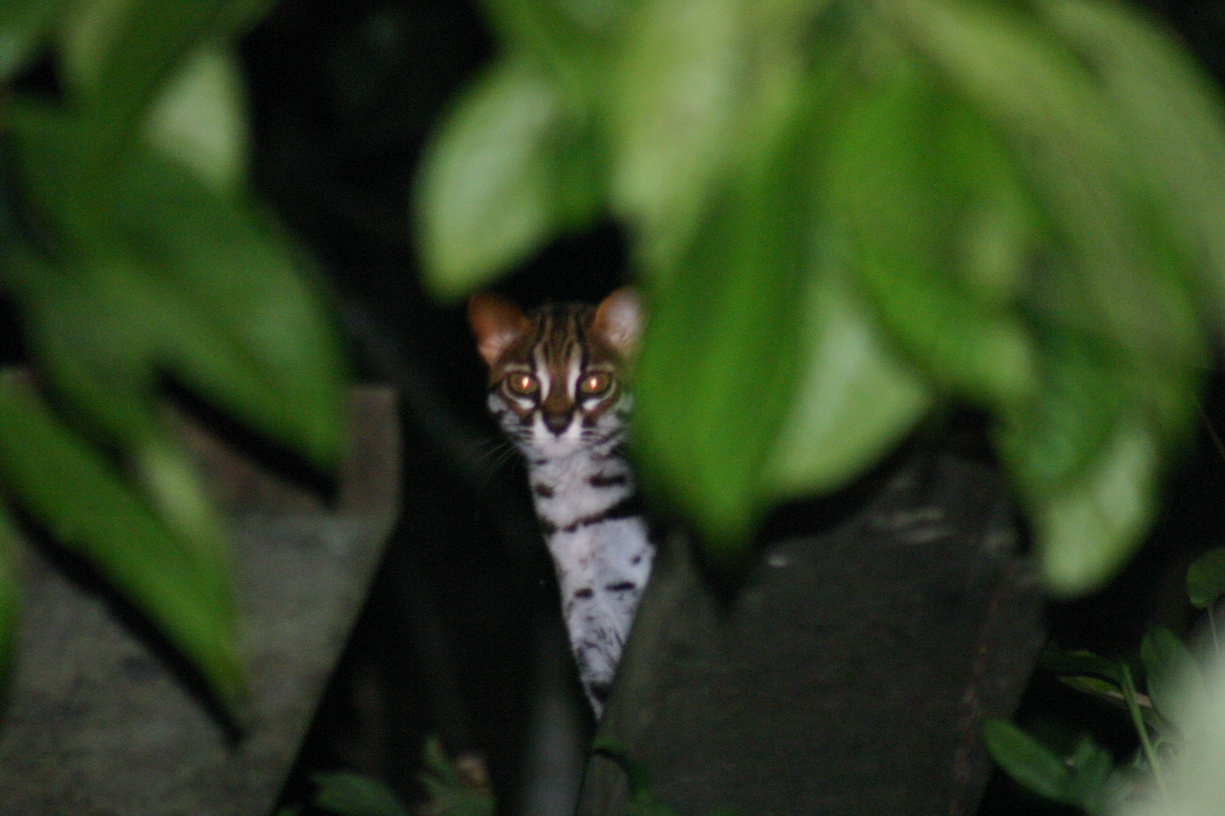

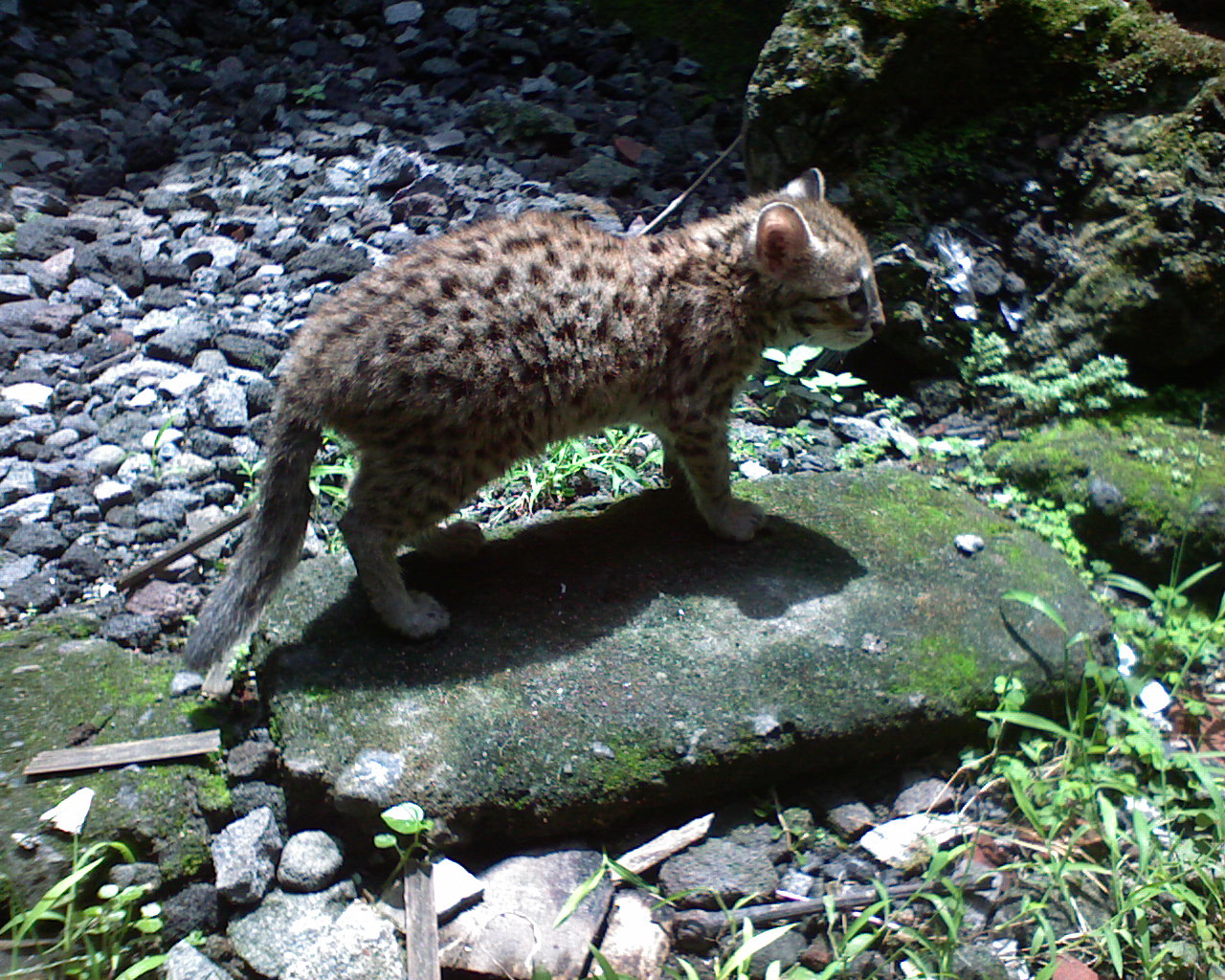
- Flat-headed cat (Prionailurus planiceps) EN
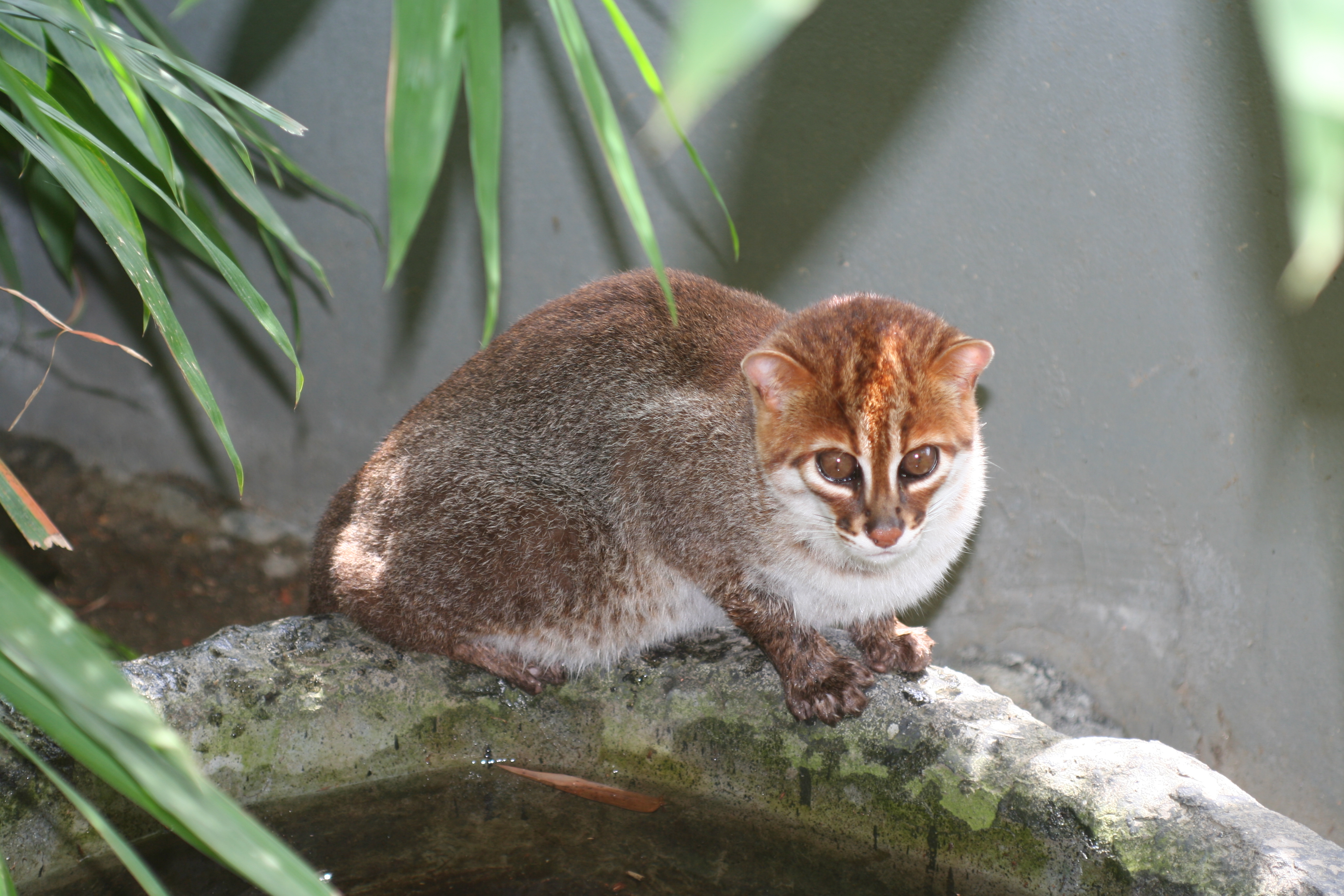

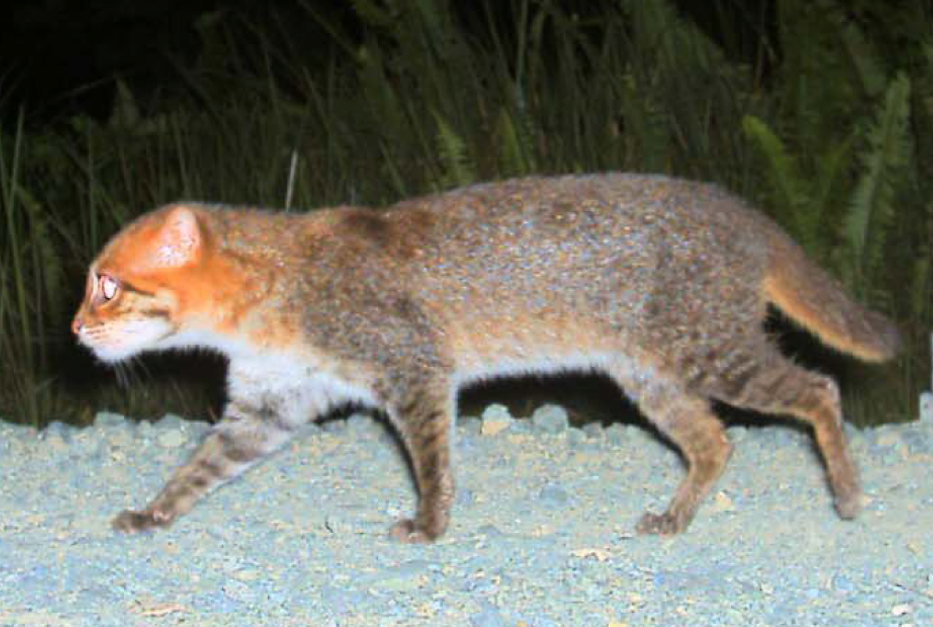

=== Family: Viverridae ===
==== Genus: Arctictis ====
Species: Binturong (Arctictis binturong) VU/

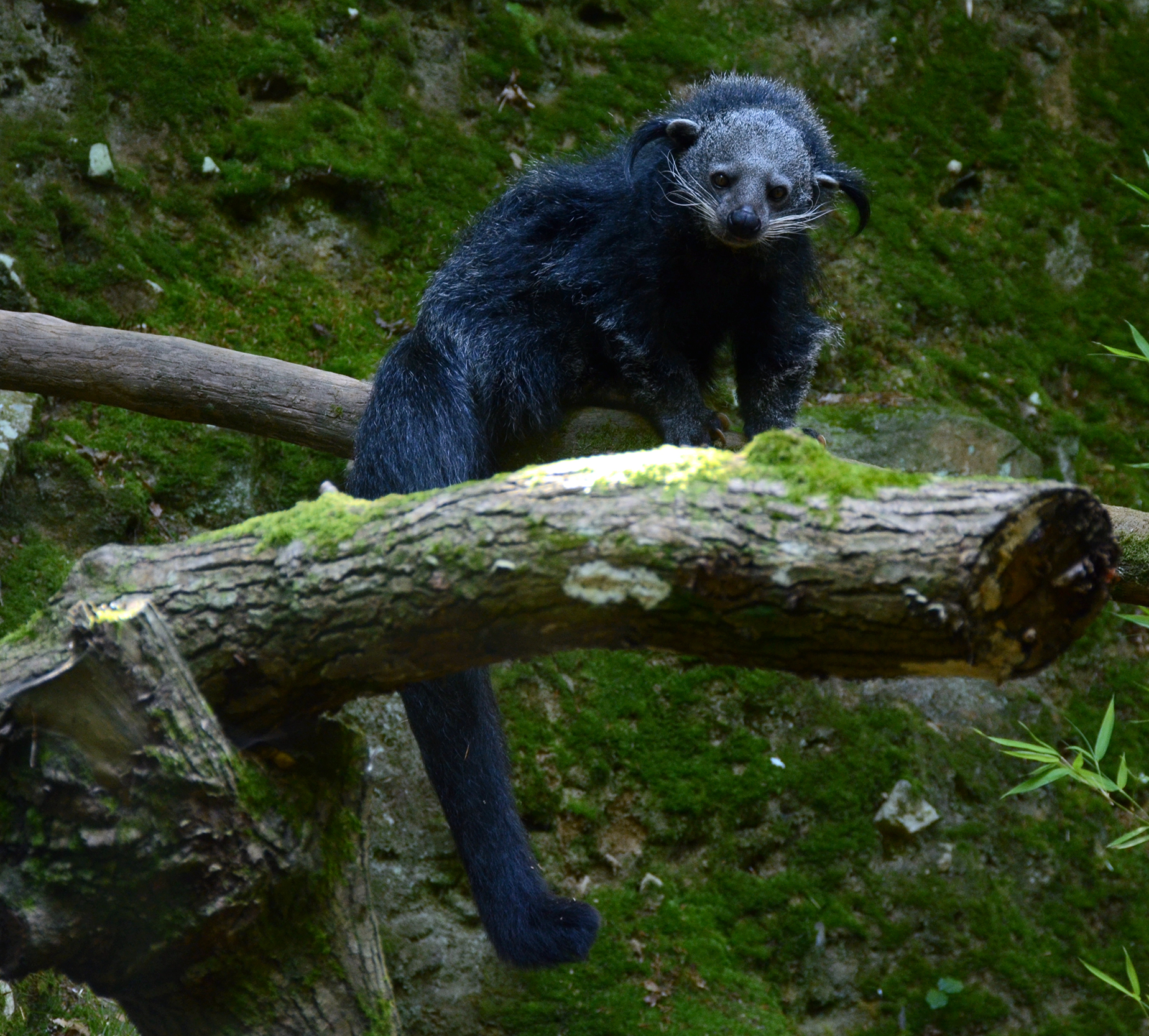

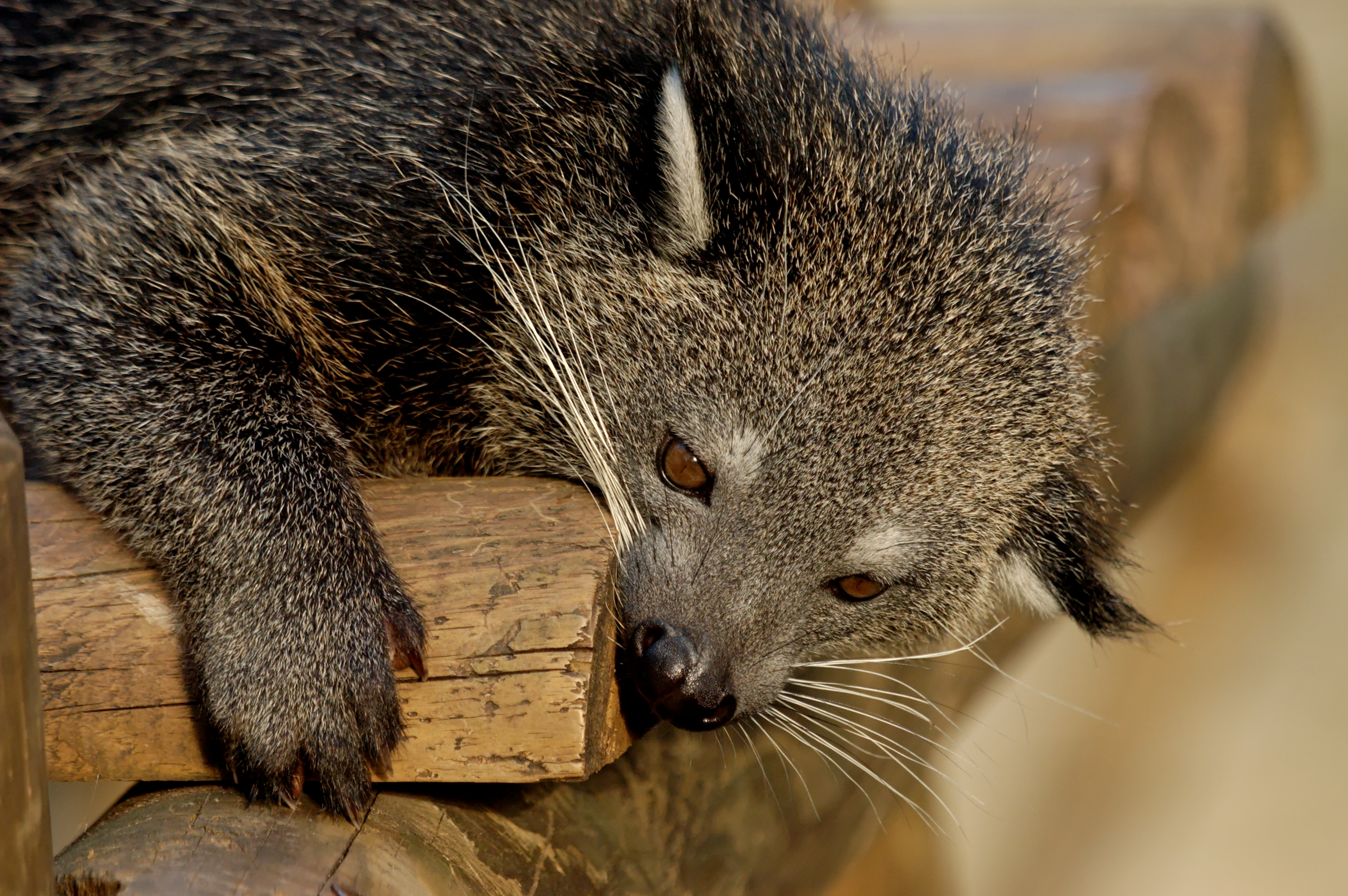

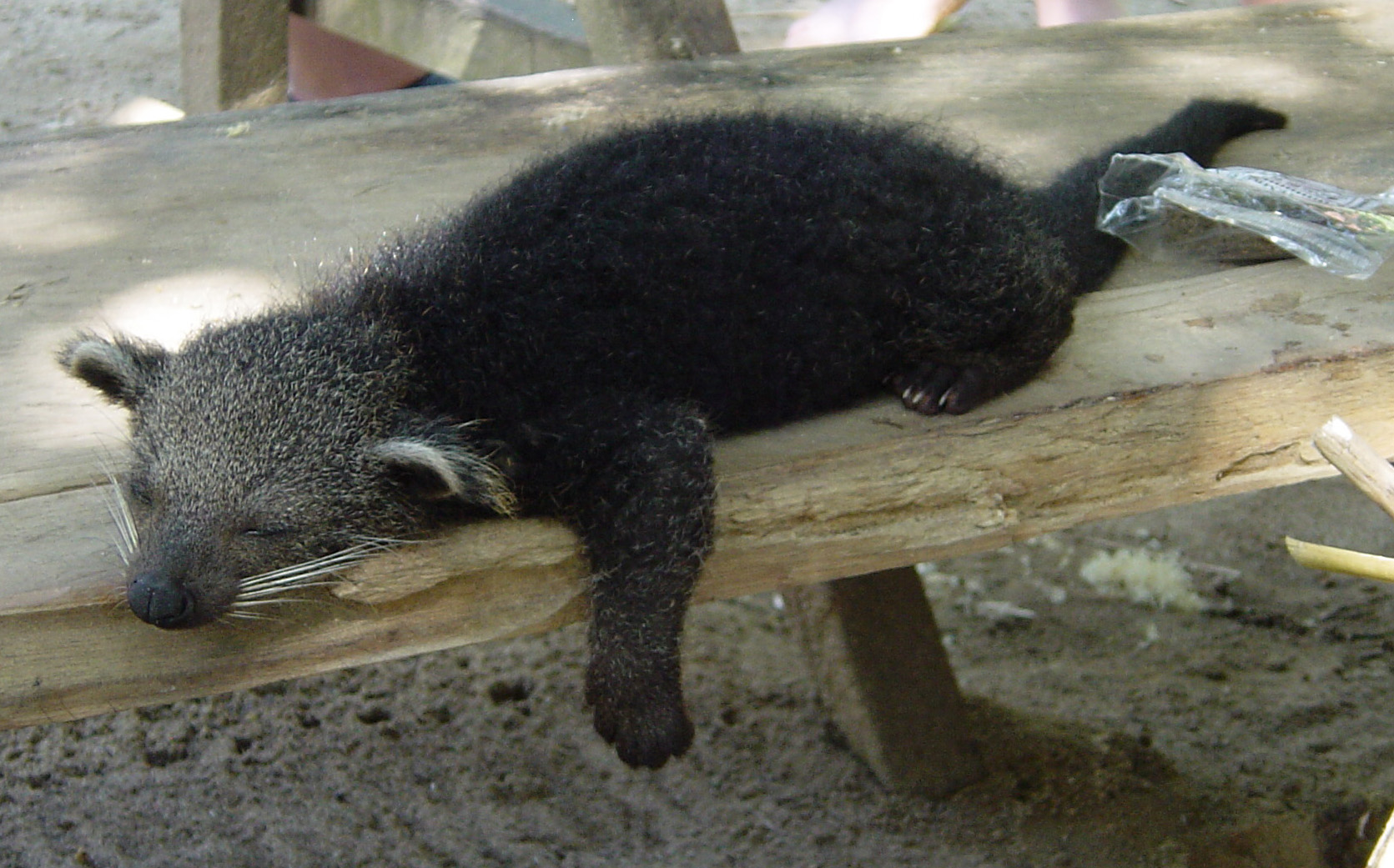

==== Genus: Arctogalidia ====
Species: Small-toothed palm civet (Arctogalidia trivirgata) LC/

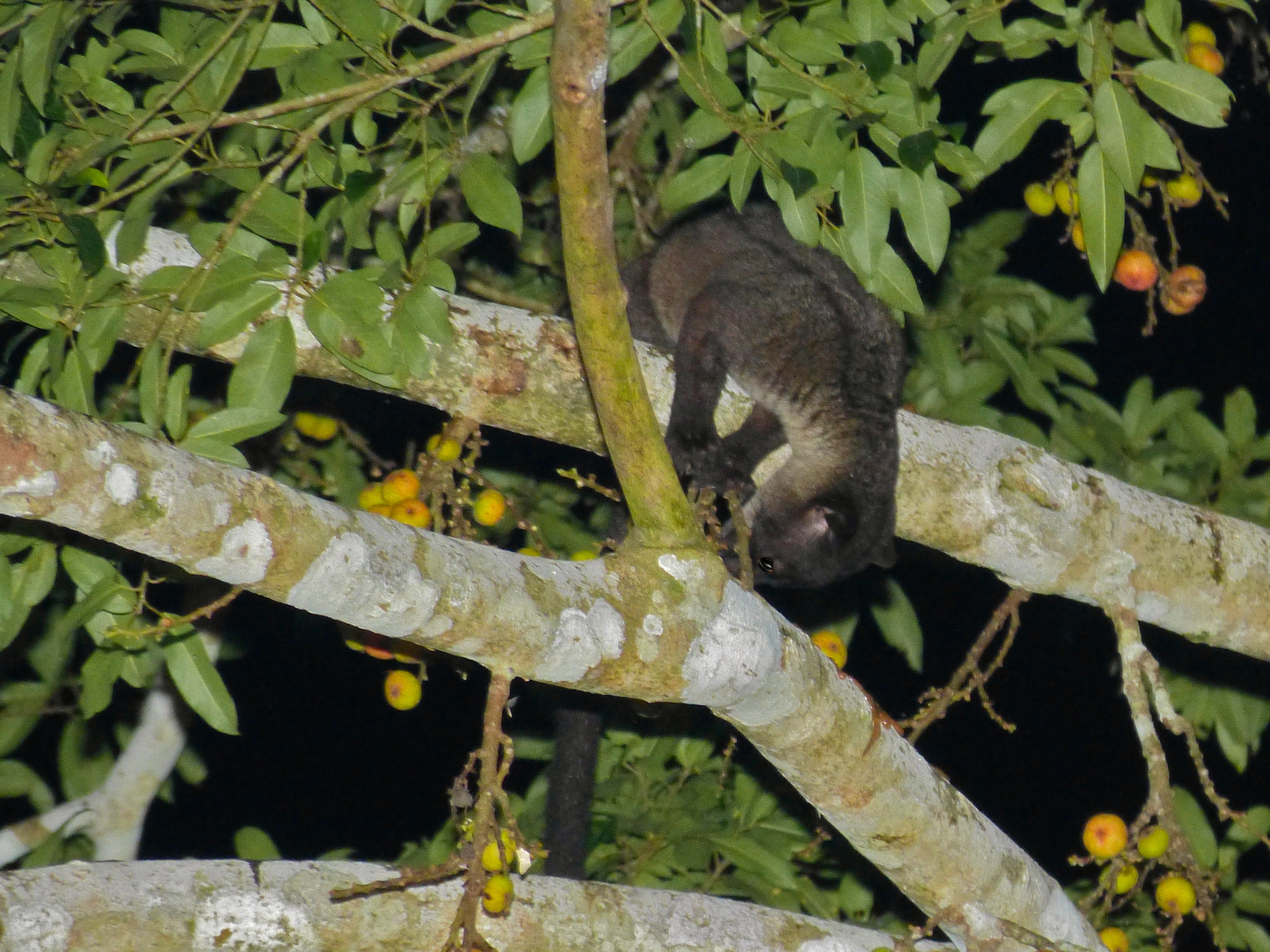

==== Genus: Cynogale ====
Species: Otter civet (Cynogale bennettii) EN/

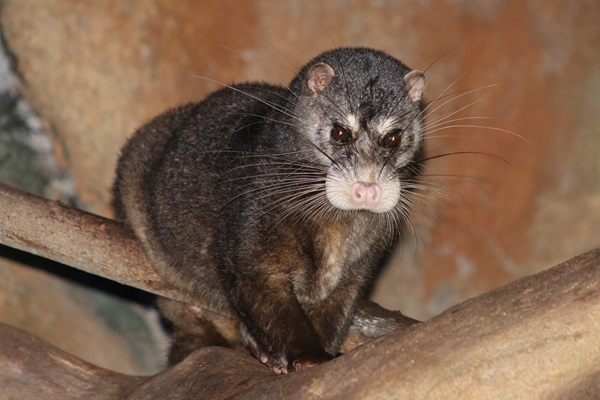

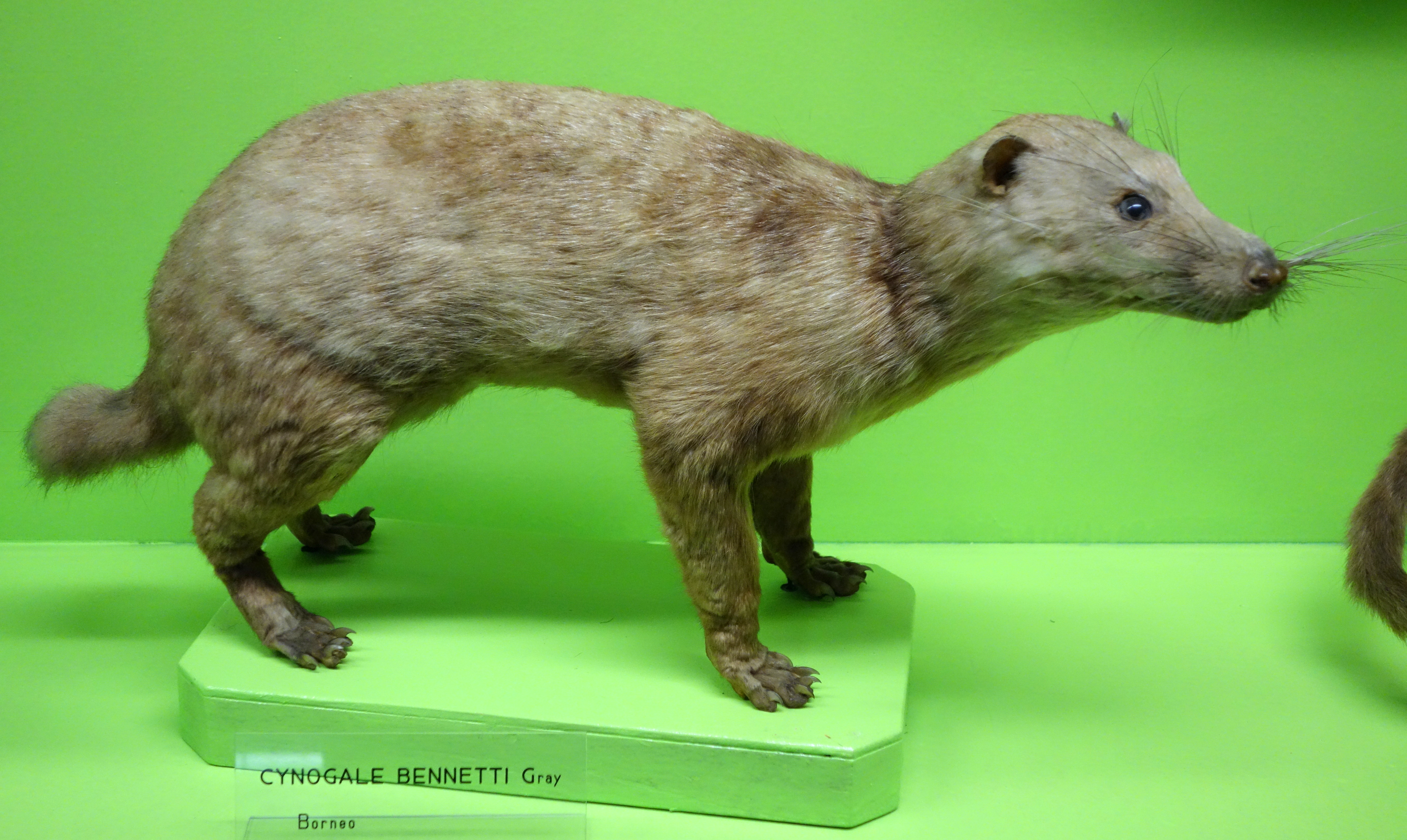

==== Genus: Hemigalus ====
Species: Banded palm civet (Hemigalus derbyanus) VU/

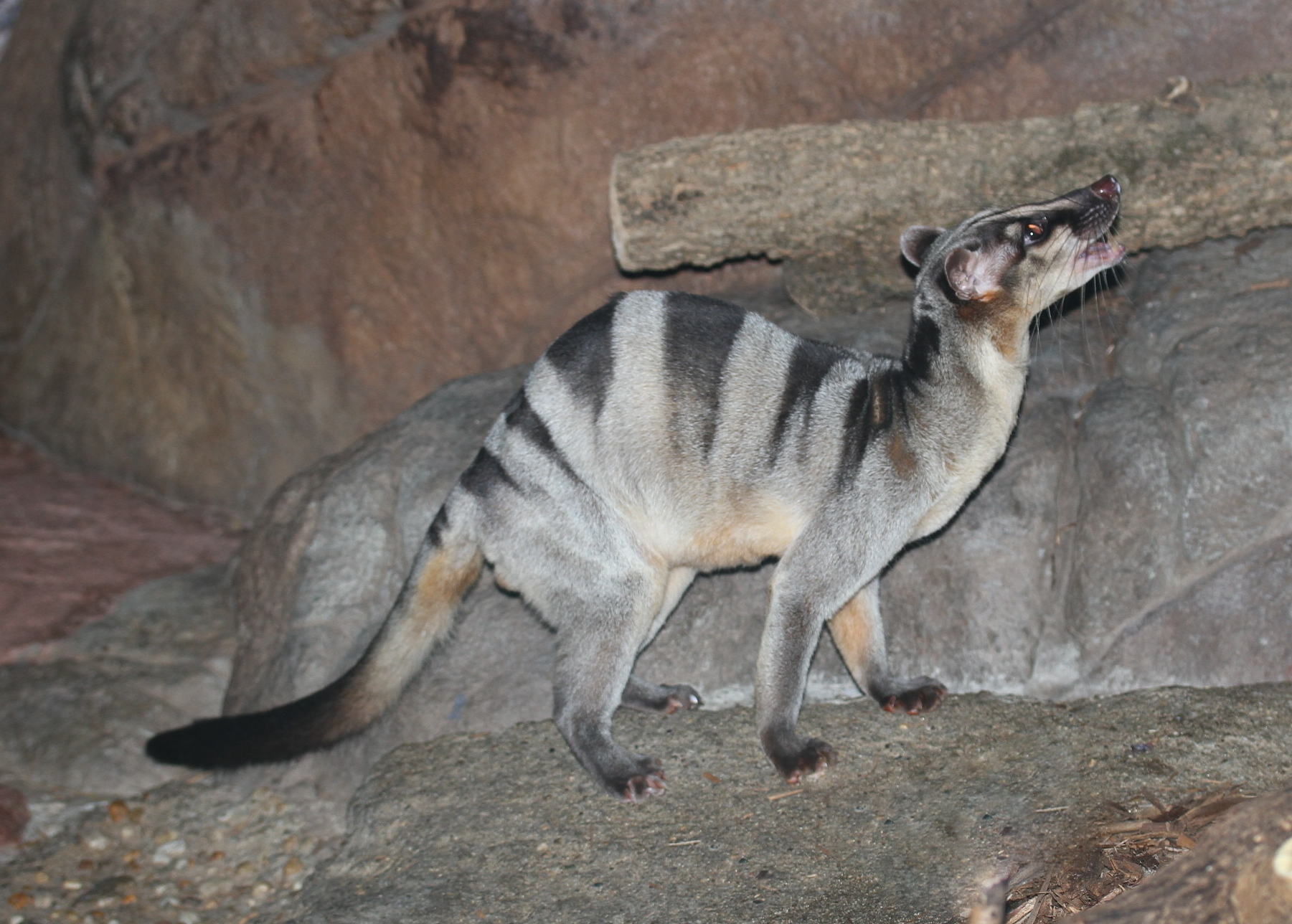

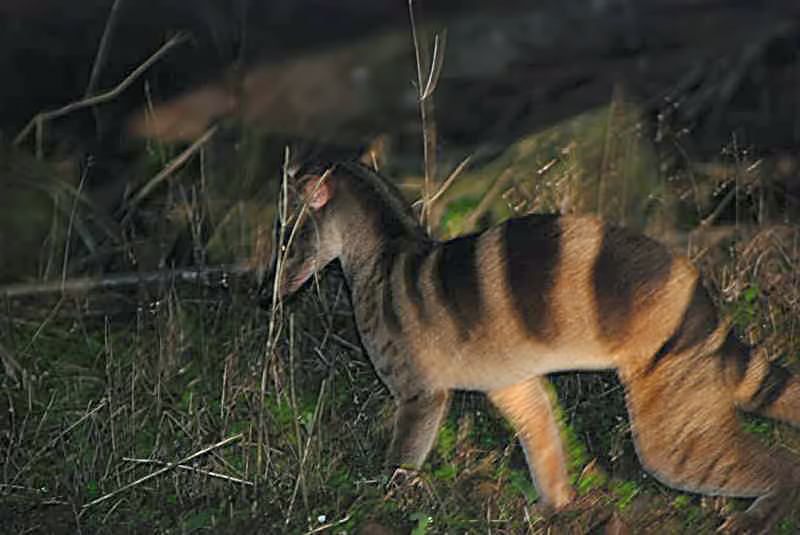

==== Genus: Paguma ====
Species: Masked palm civet (Paguma larvata) LC/

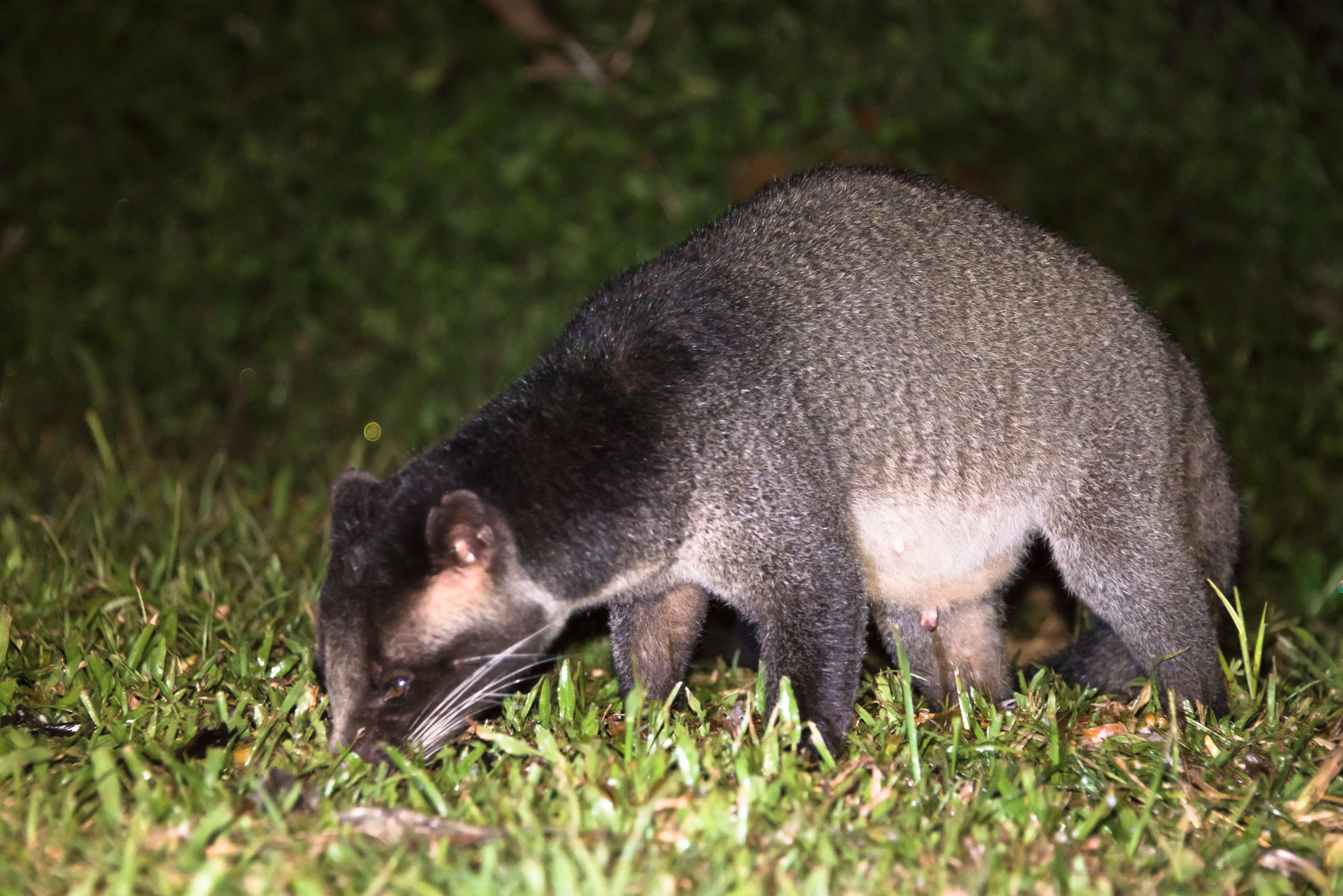

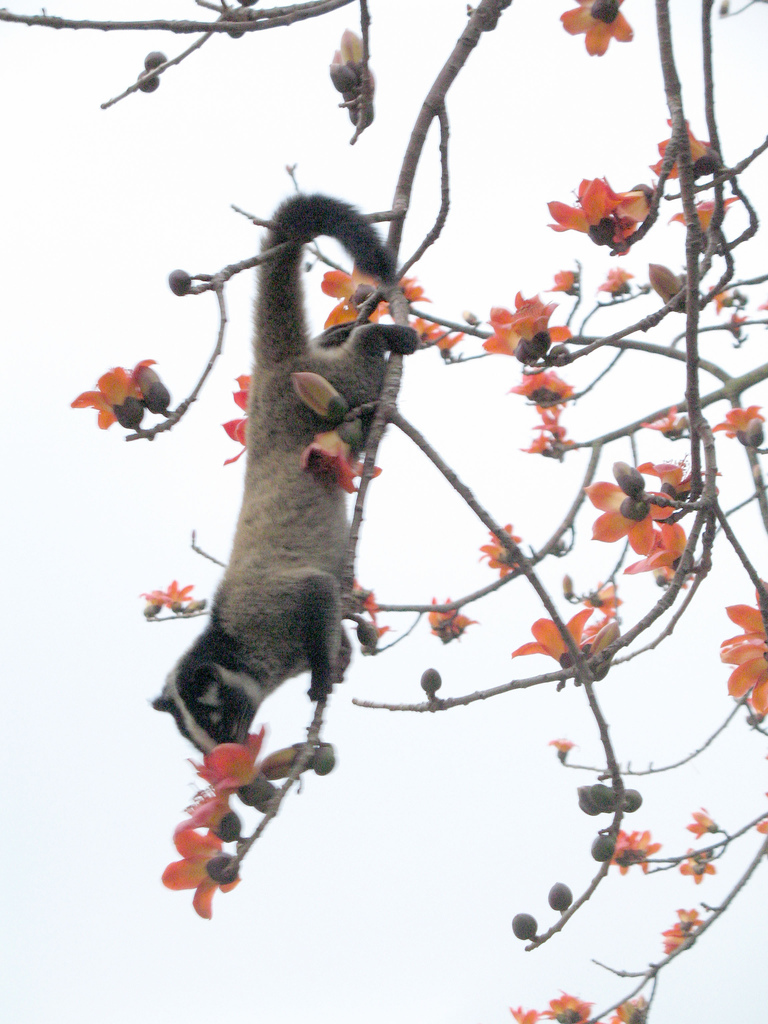

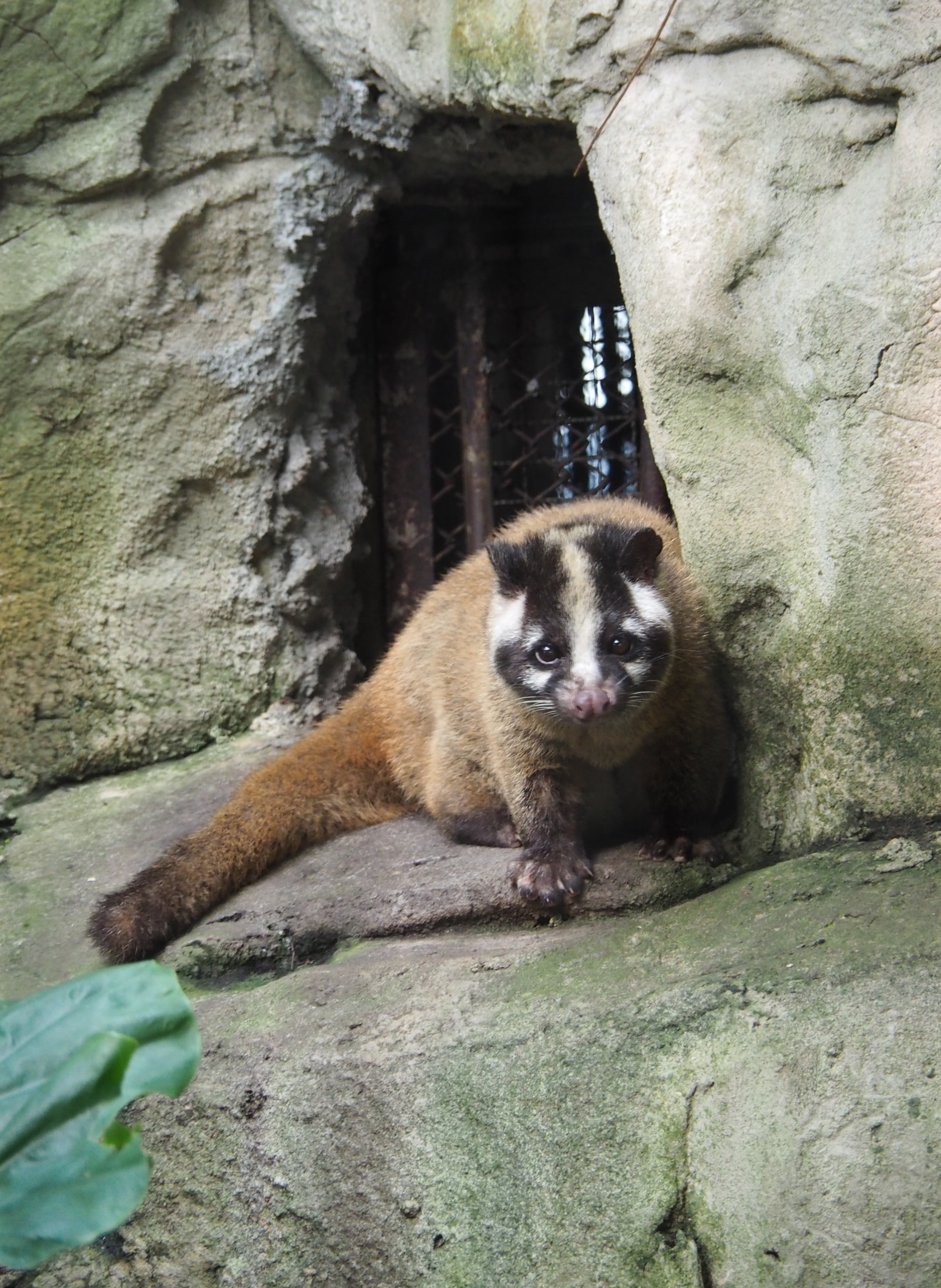

==== Genus: Paradoxurus ====
Species: Asian palm civet (Paradoxurus hermaphrodites) LC/

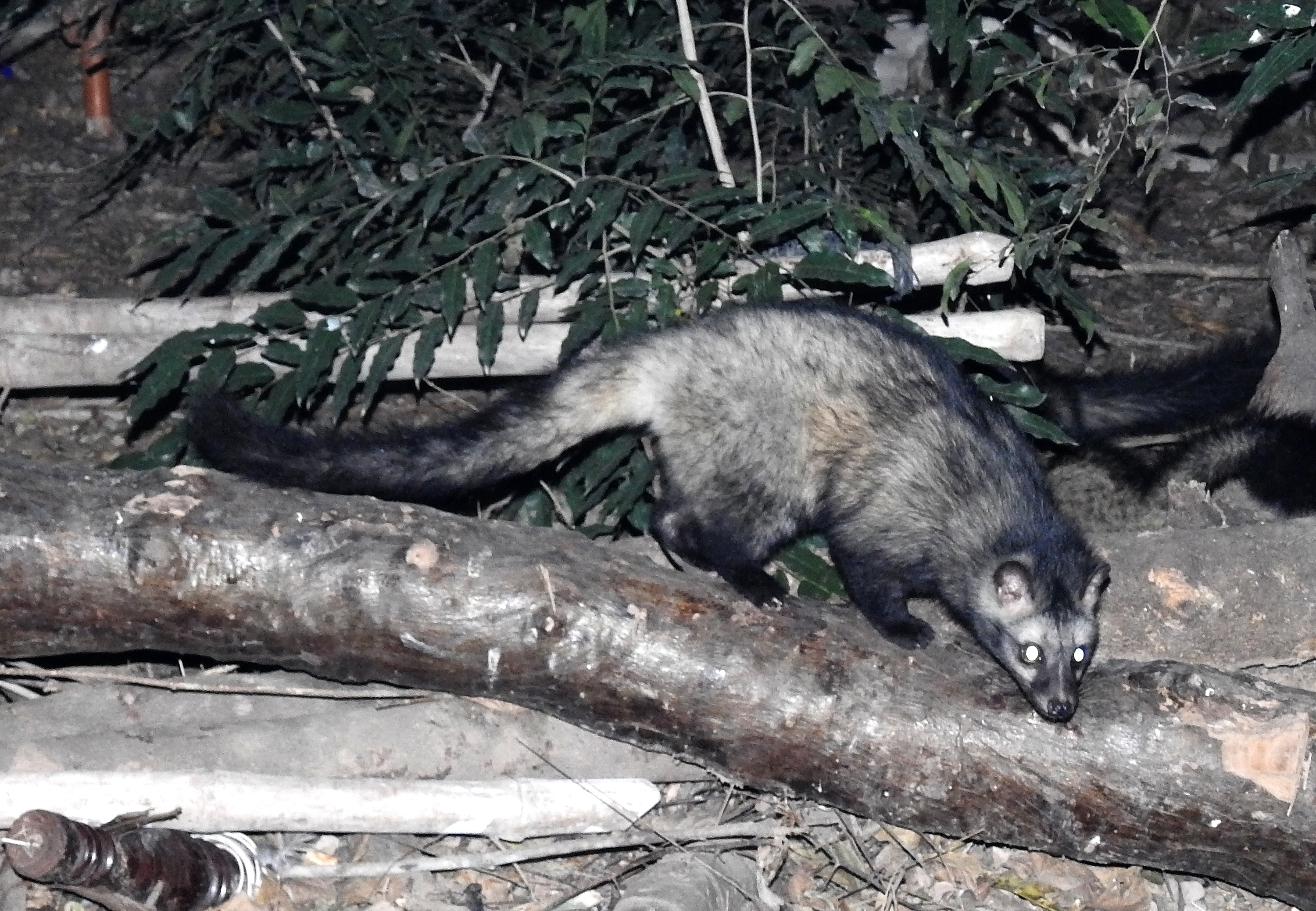

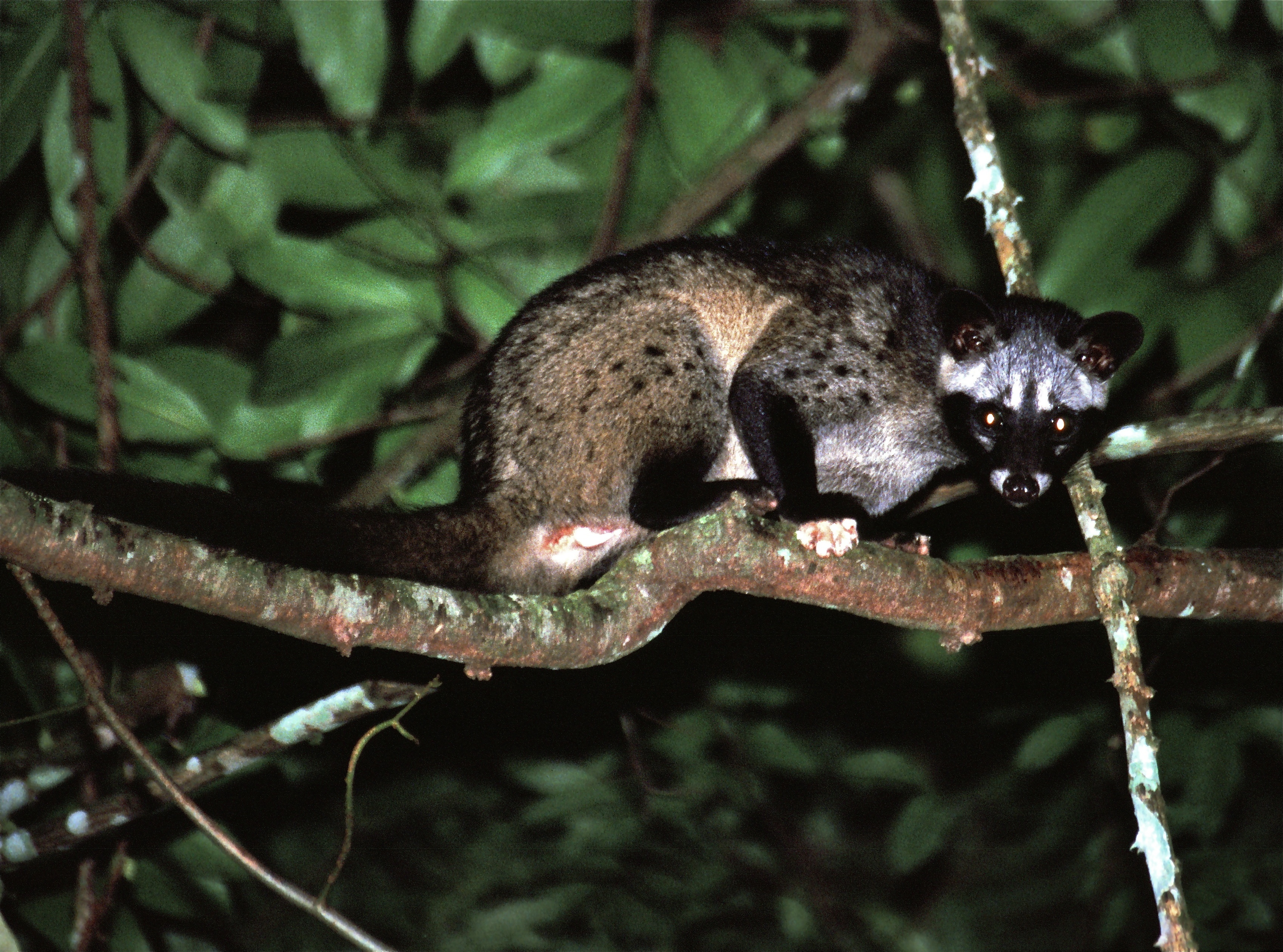

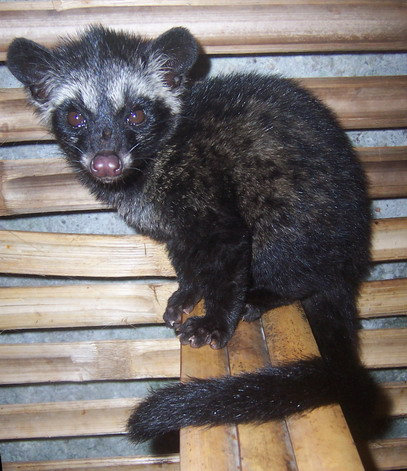

==== Genus: Viverra ====
Species: Malayan civet (Viverra tangalunga) LC/

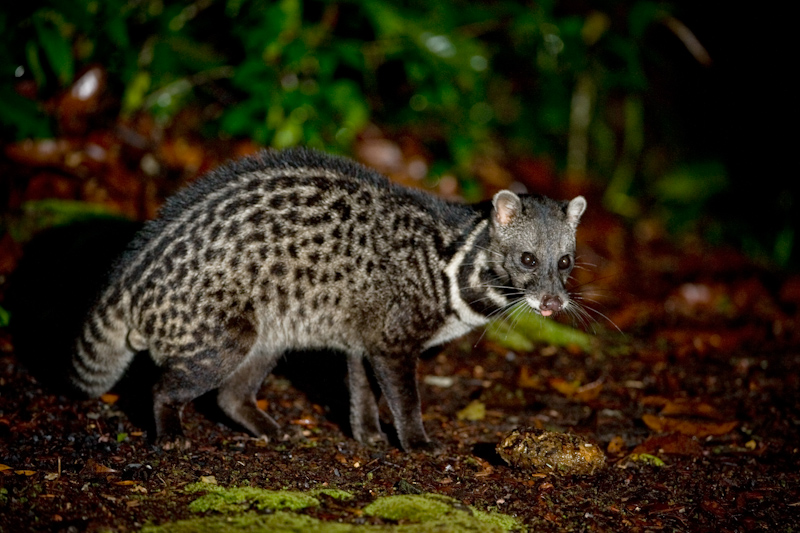

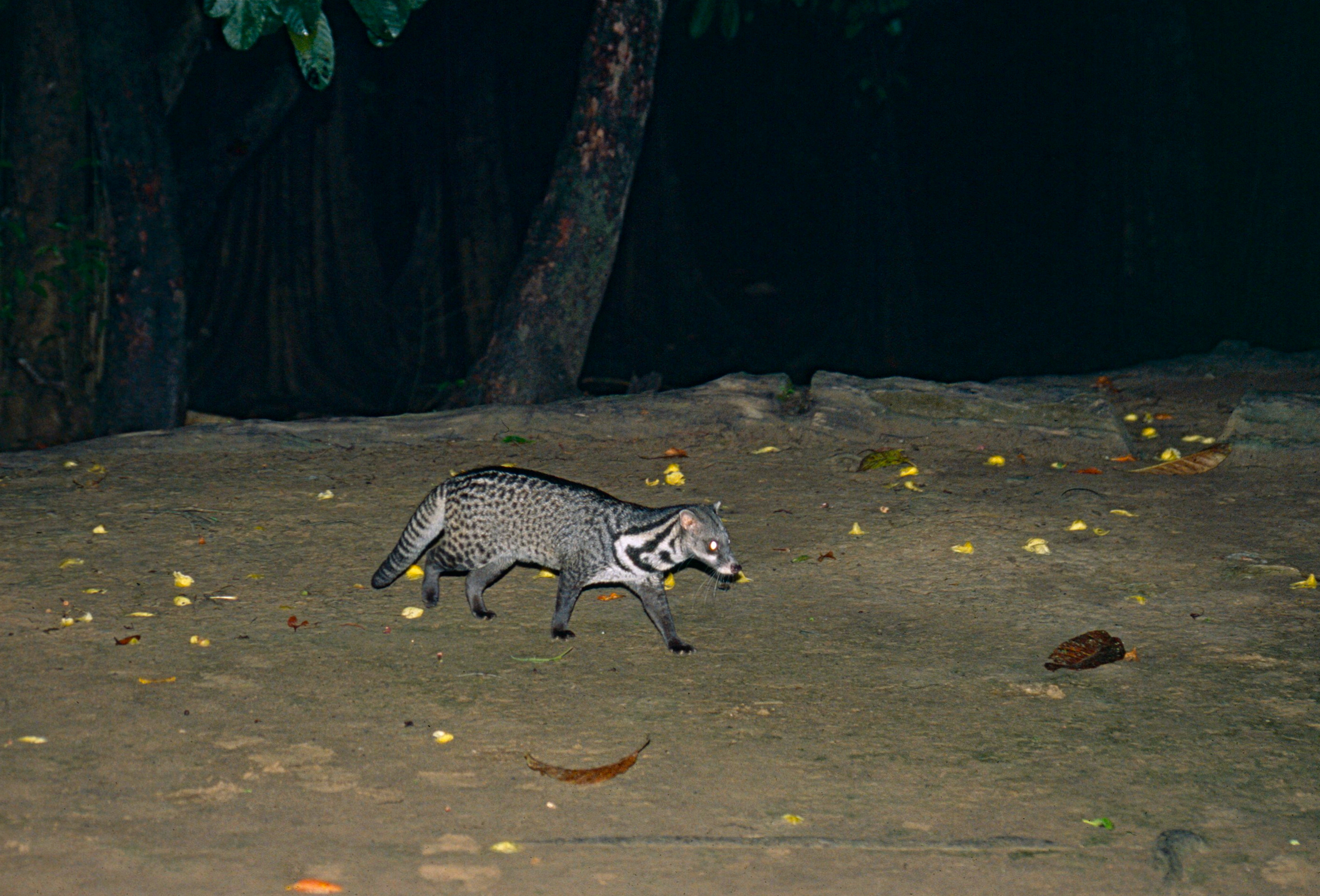

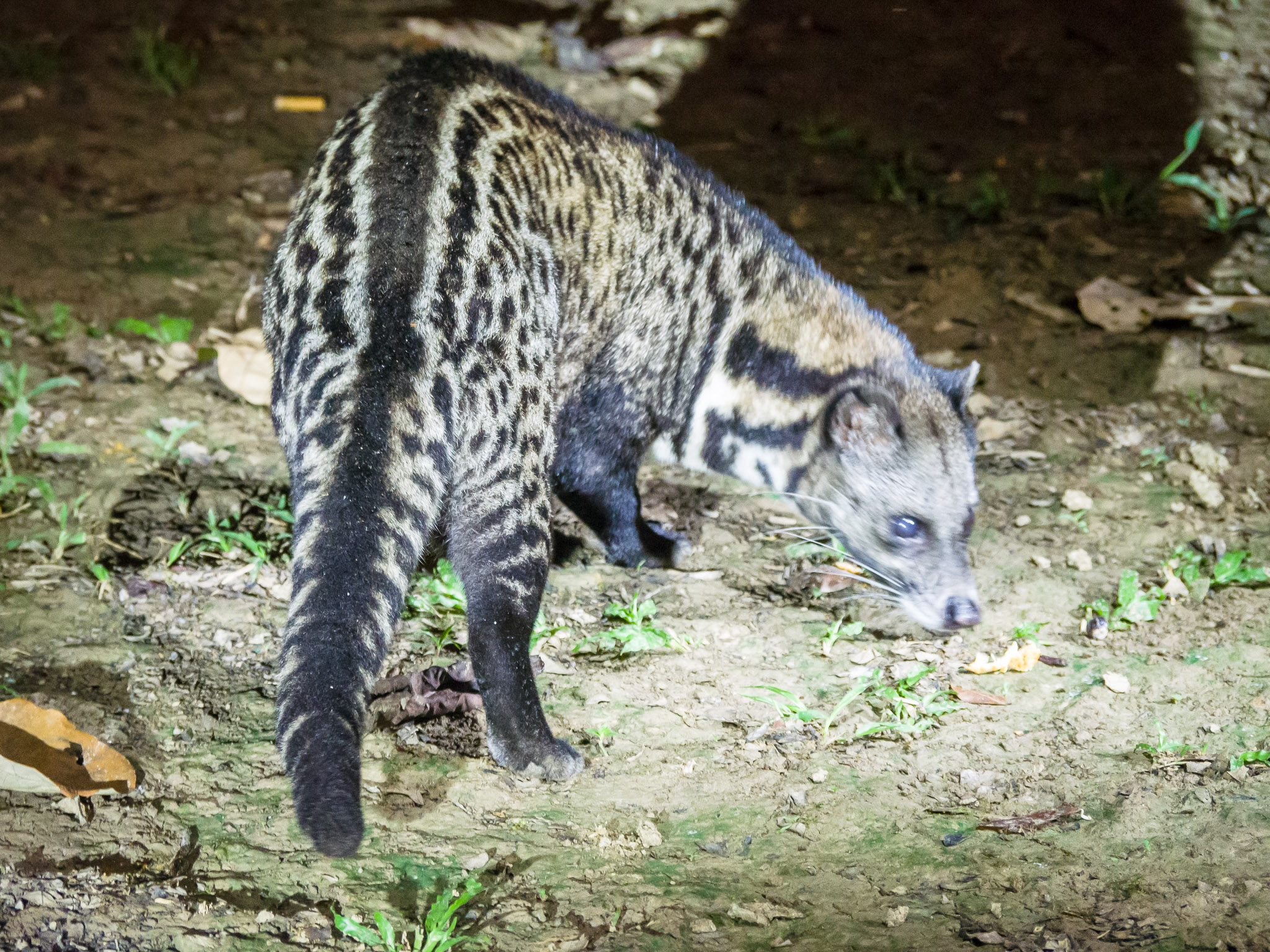

==== Genus: Viverricula ====
Species: Small Indian civet (Viverricula indica) LC/ Note: Its current status and species presence on Sumatra still unclear. Only few published record reported species existence on northern Sumatra, and none of them came from southern Sumatra. Further verification and confirmation required.

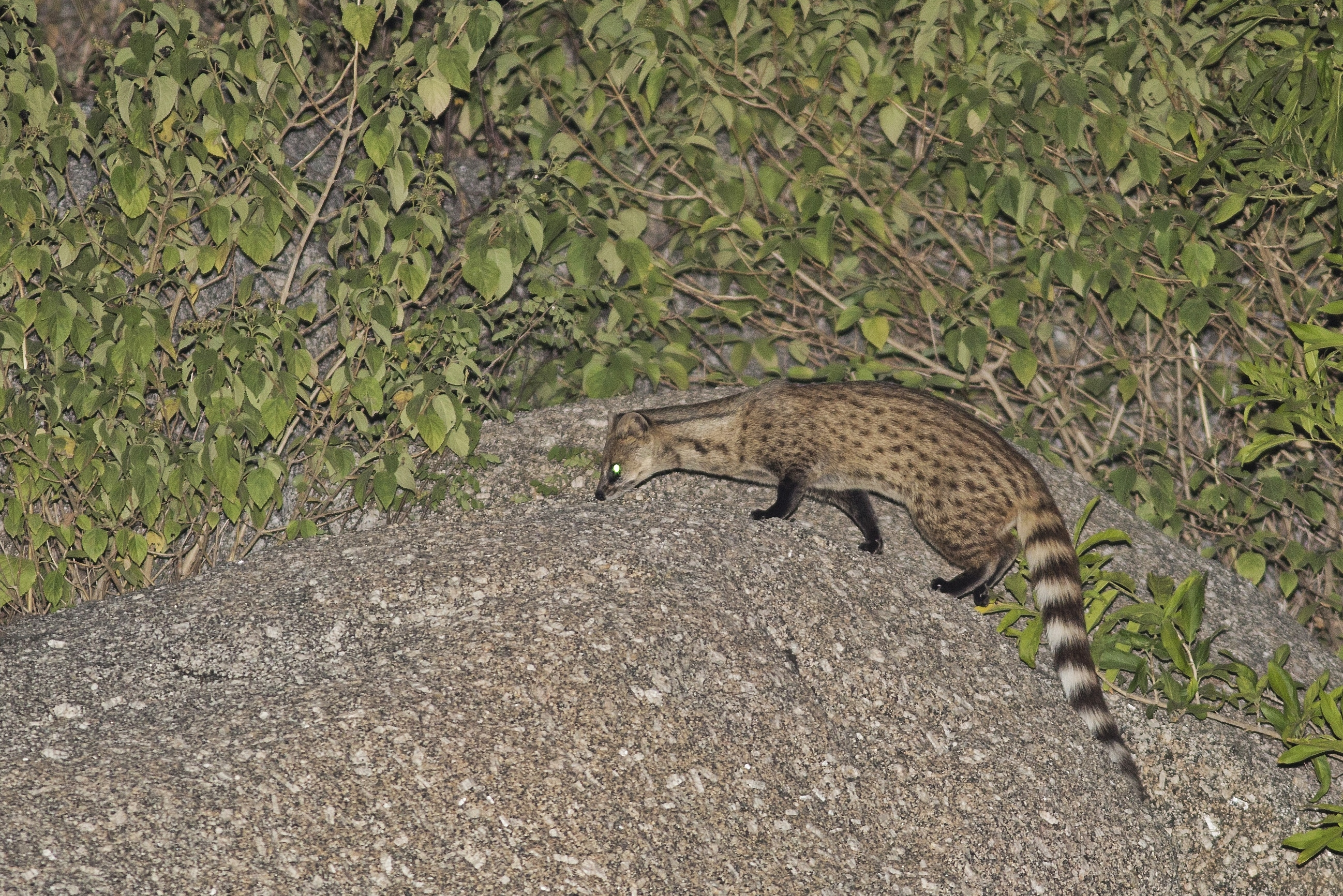

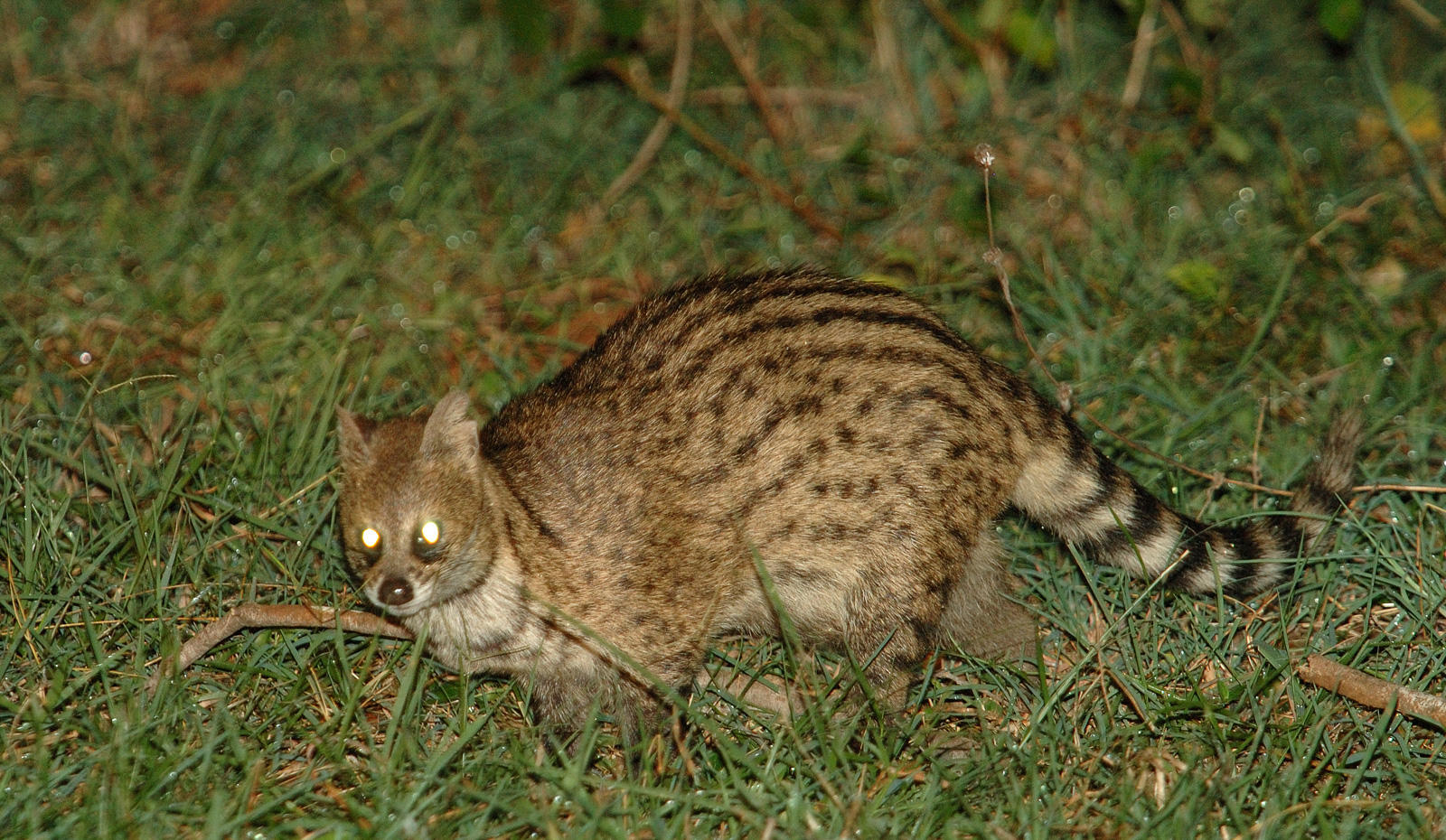

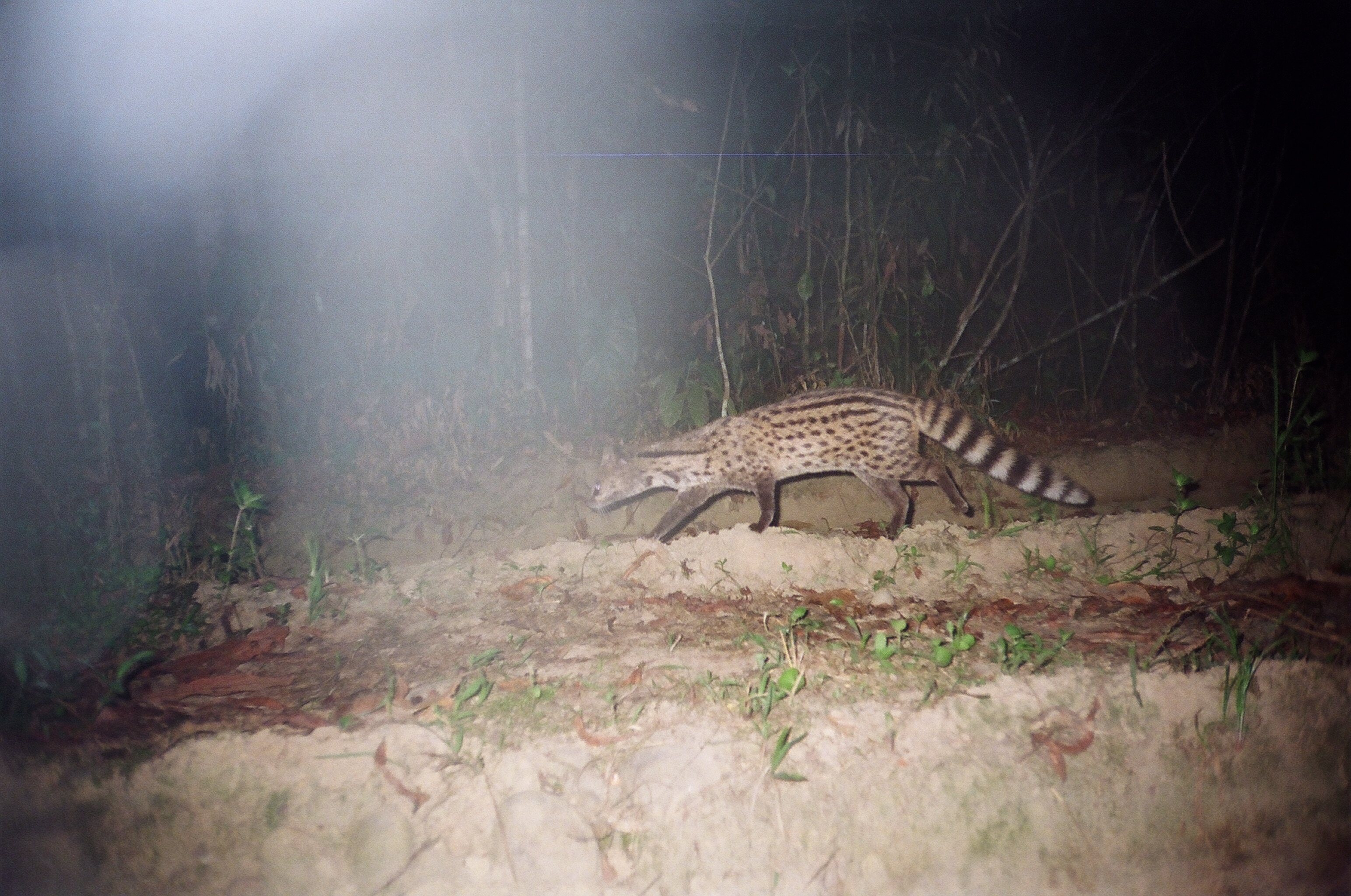

=== Family: Prionodontidae ===
==== Genus: Prionodon ====
Species: Banded linsang (Prionodon linsang) LC/

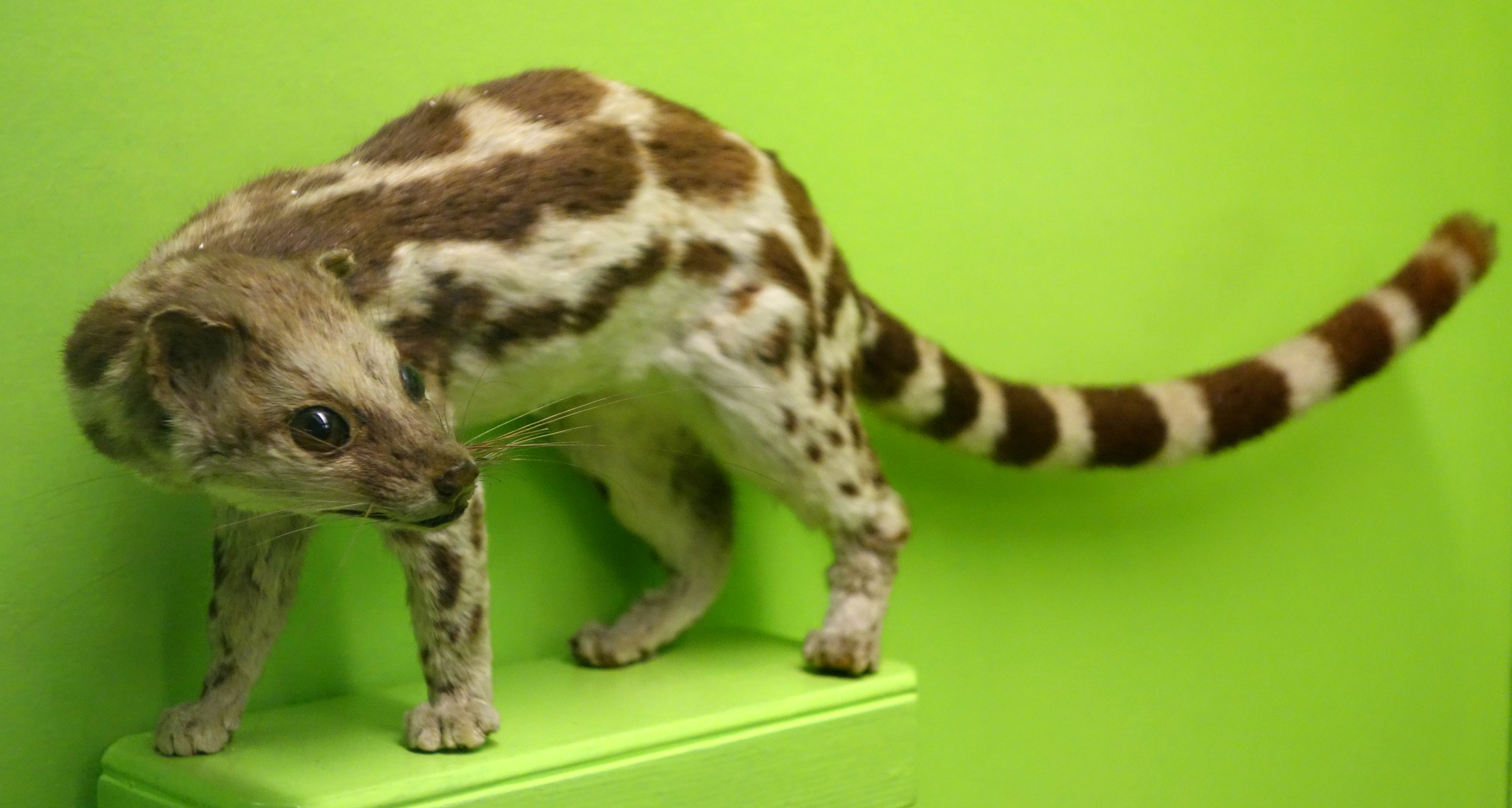

=== Family: Herpestidae ===
==== Genus: Urva ====
Species:

- Short-tailed mongoose (Urva brachyura) LC/
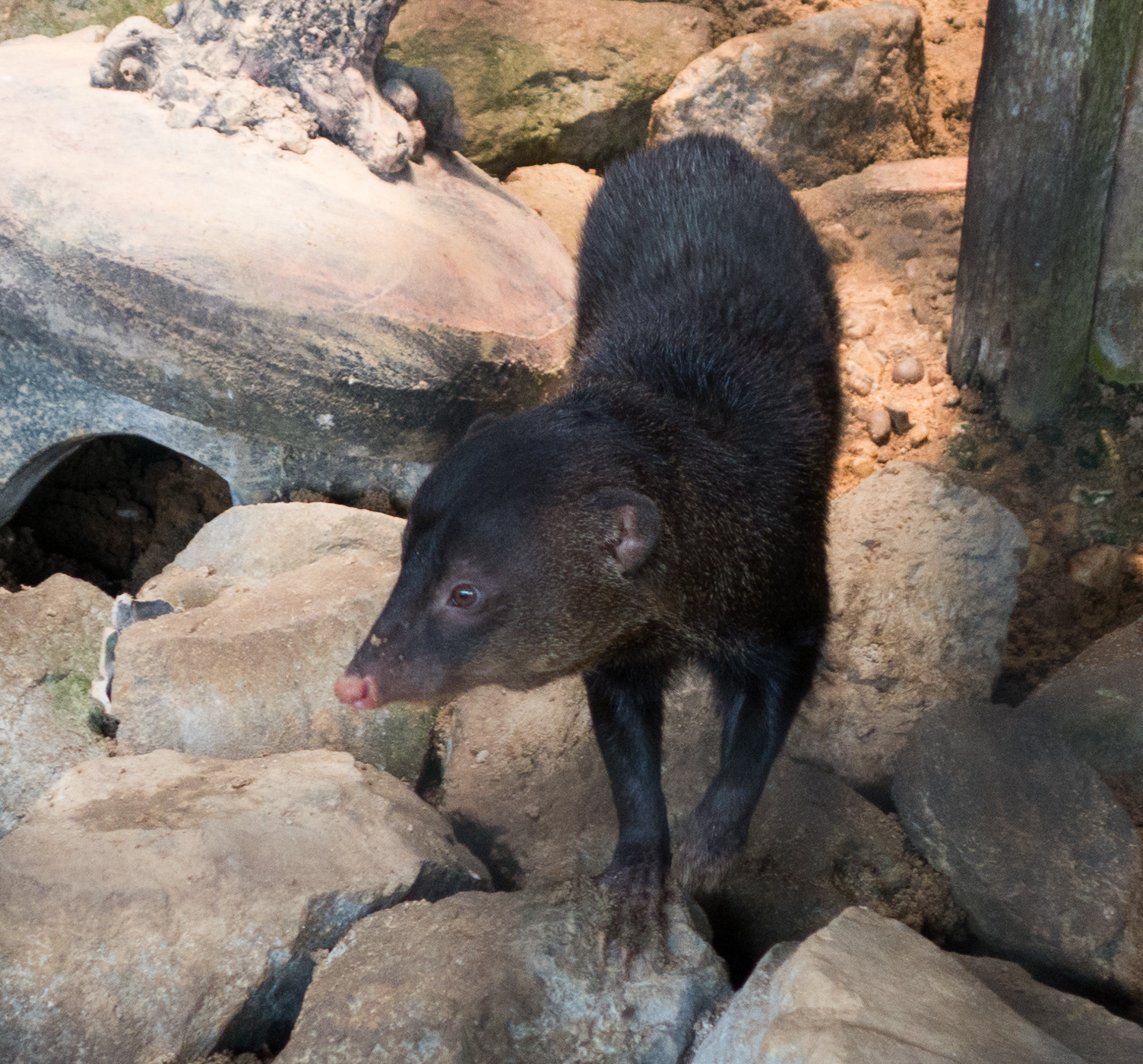
- Javan mongoose (Urva javanica) LC/

Note: Its current status and species presence in Sumatra are still unclear. Presumably, this species was restricted to the northern fifth part of Sumatra.

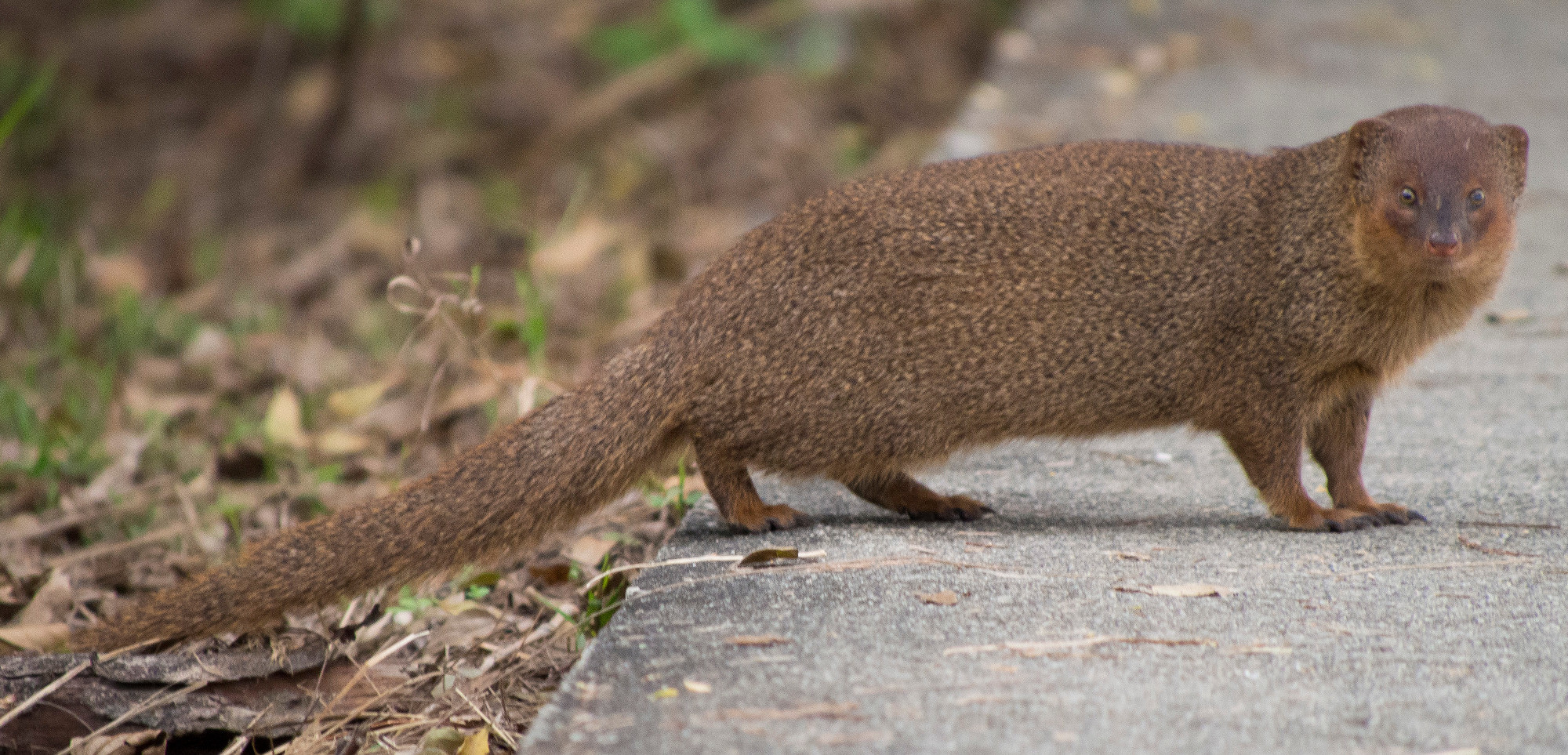

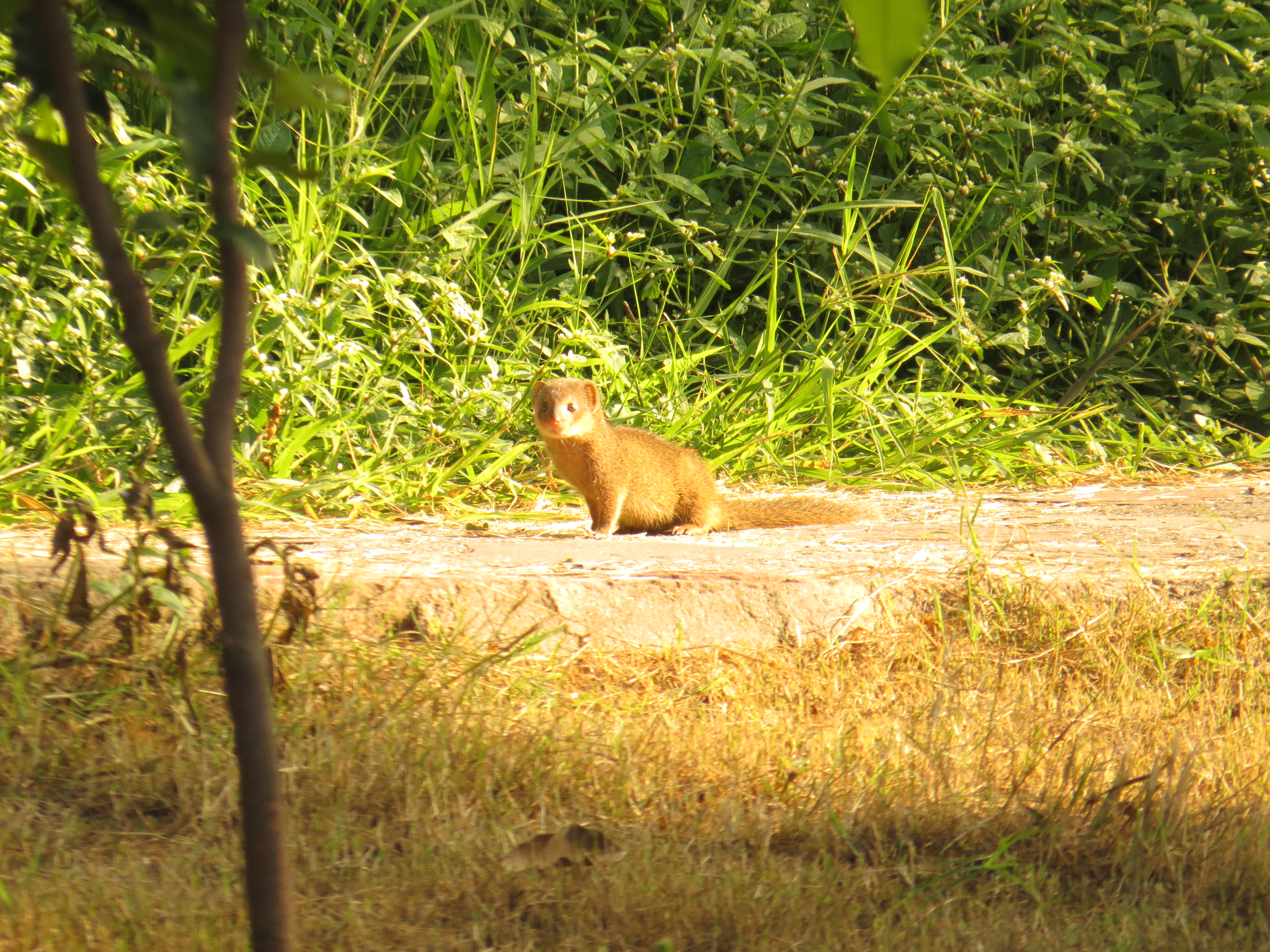
- Collared mongoose (Urva semitorquata) DD/

Note: The current status and species presence in Sumatra are still unclear. It is still undecided whether the species were introduced to Sumatra or underrecorded rare native species to the island. Further studies are required.

=== Family: Ursidae ===
==== Genus: Helarctos ====
Species: Sun bear (Helarctos malayanus) VU/

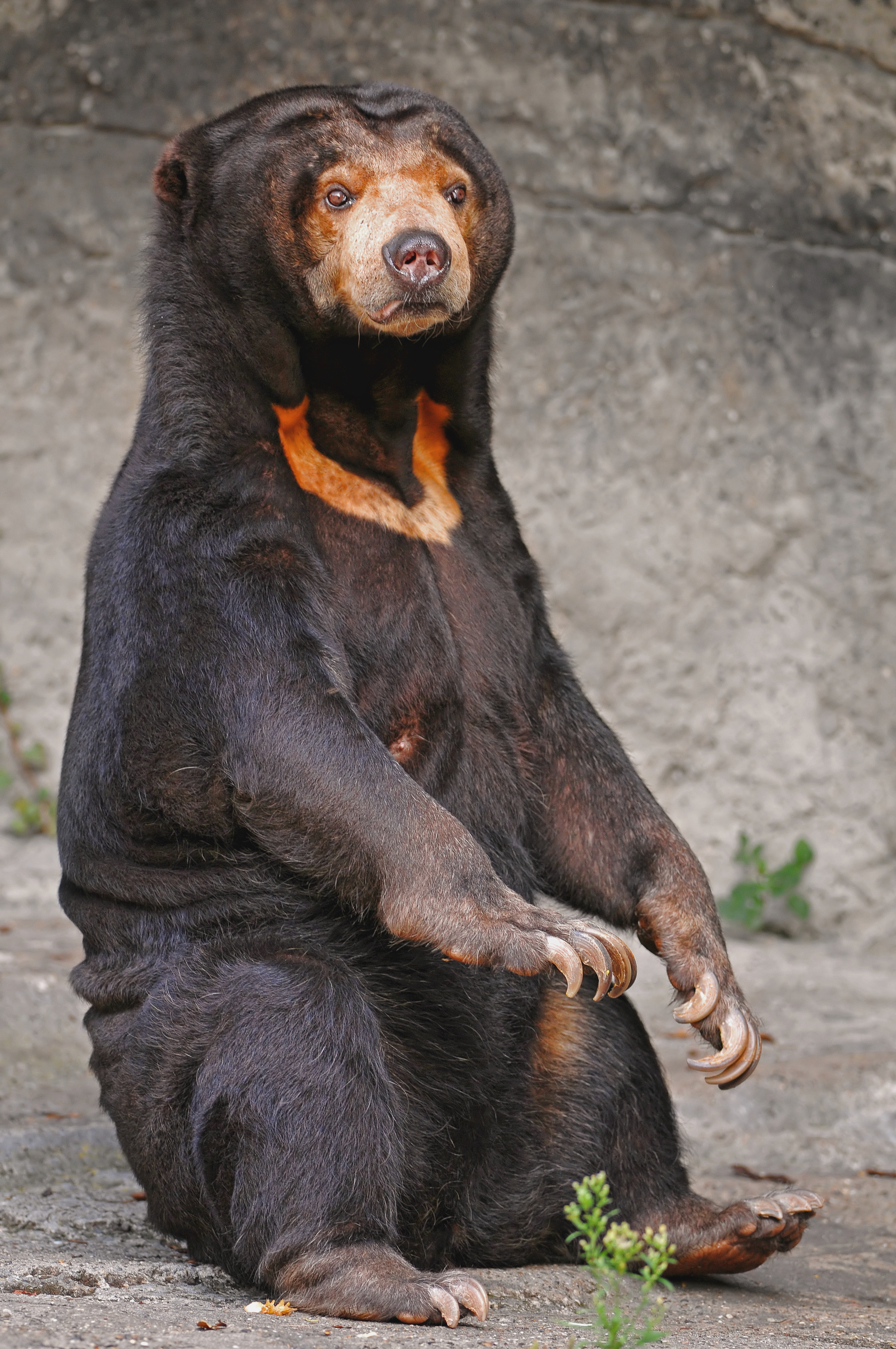

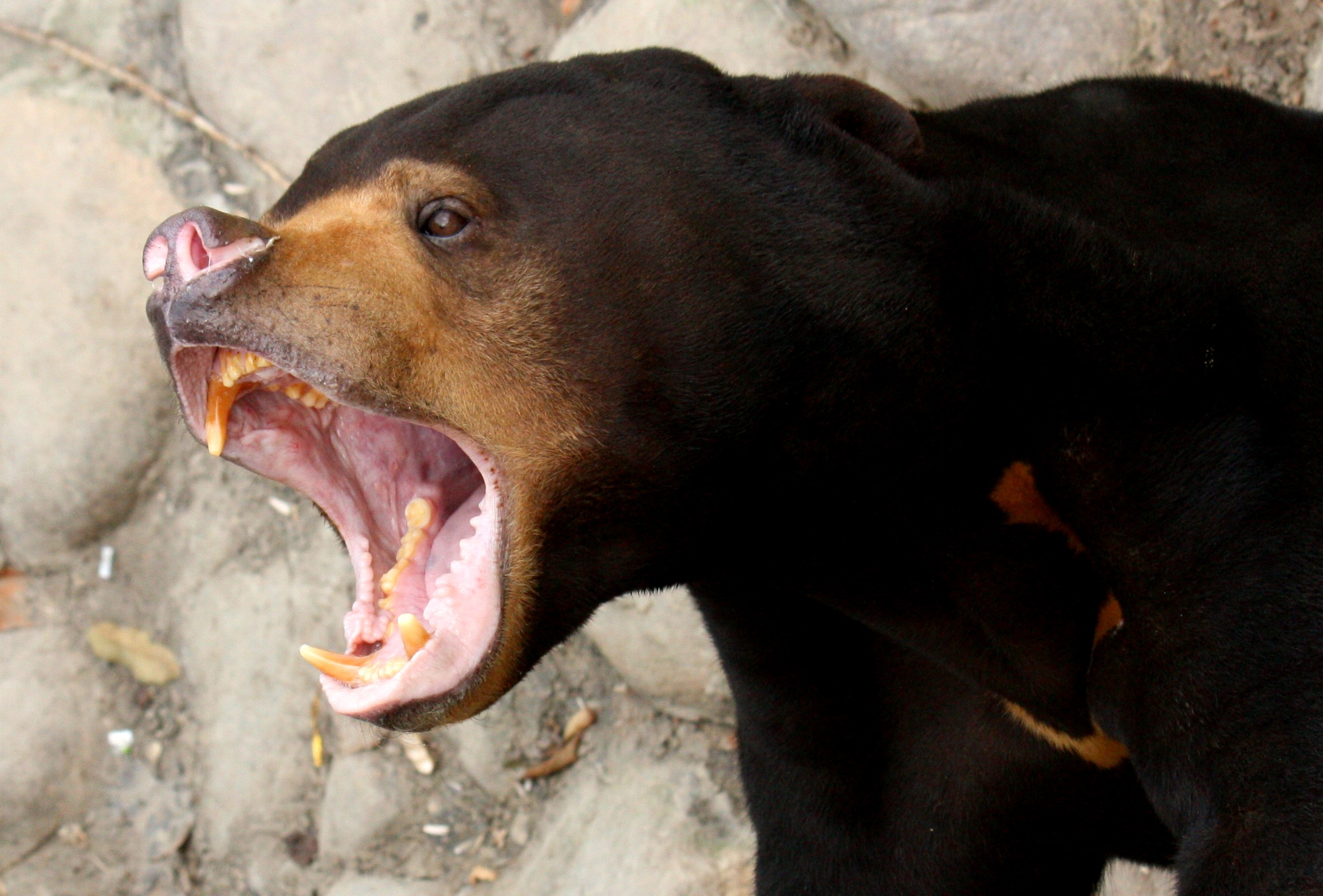

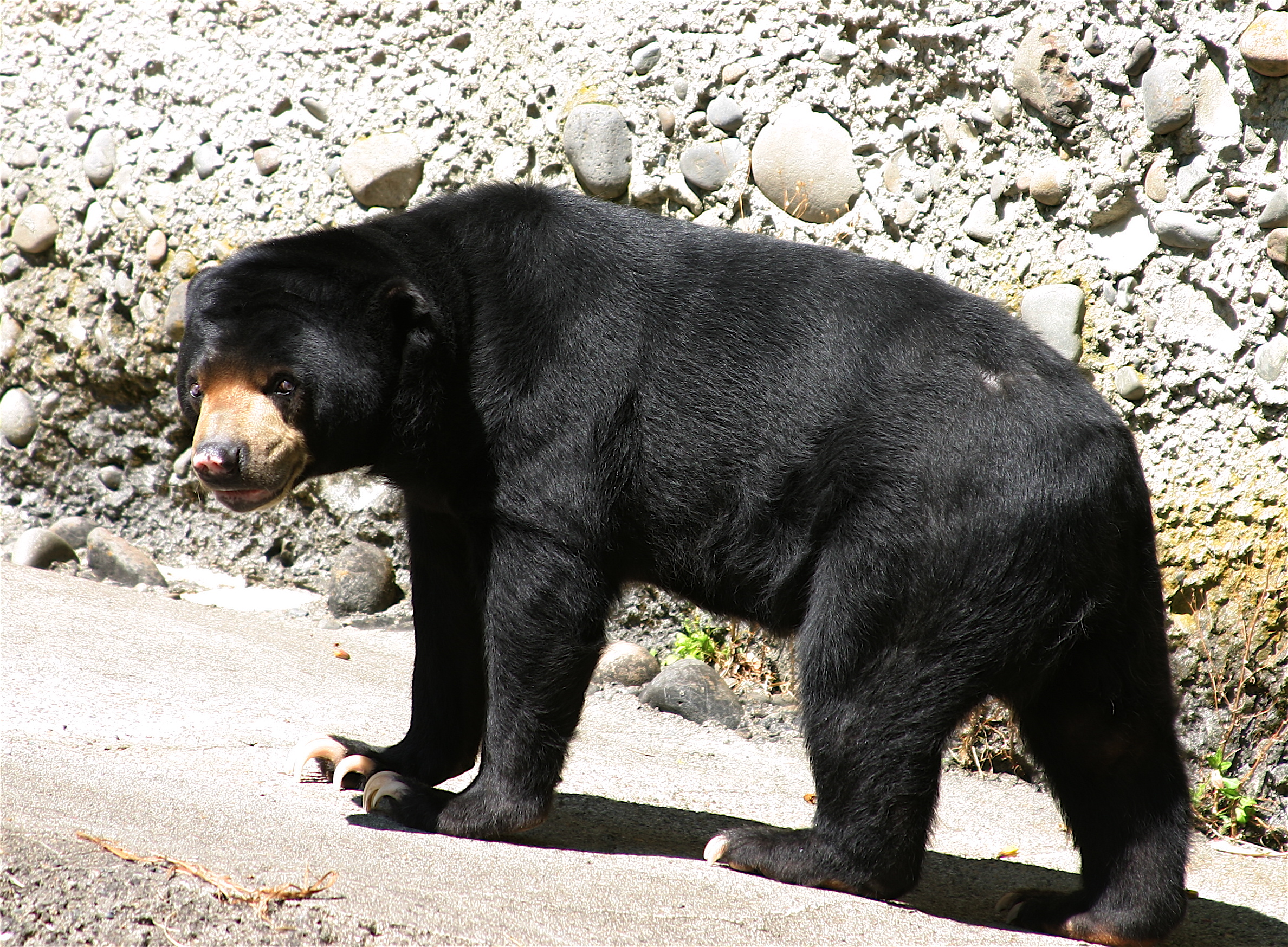

=== Family: Canidae ===
==== Genus: Cuon ====
Species: Dhole (Cuon alpinus) EN/

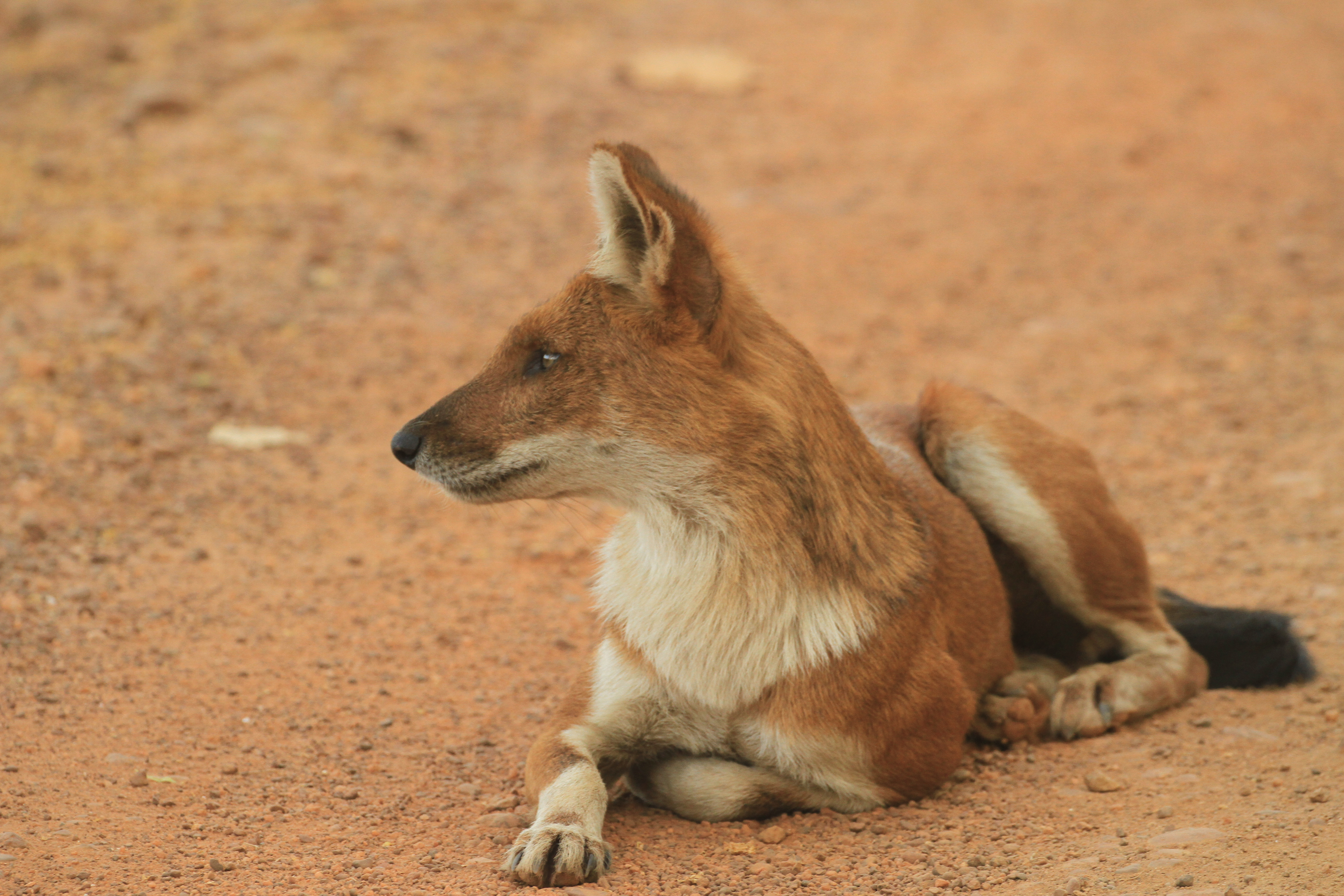

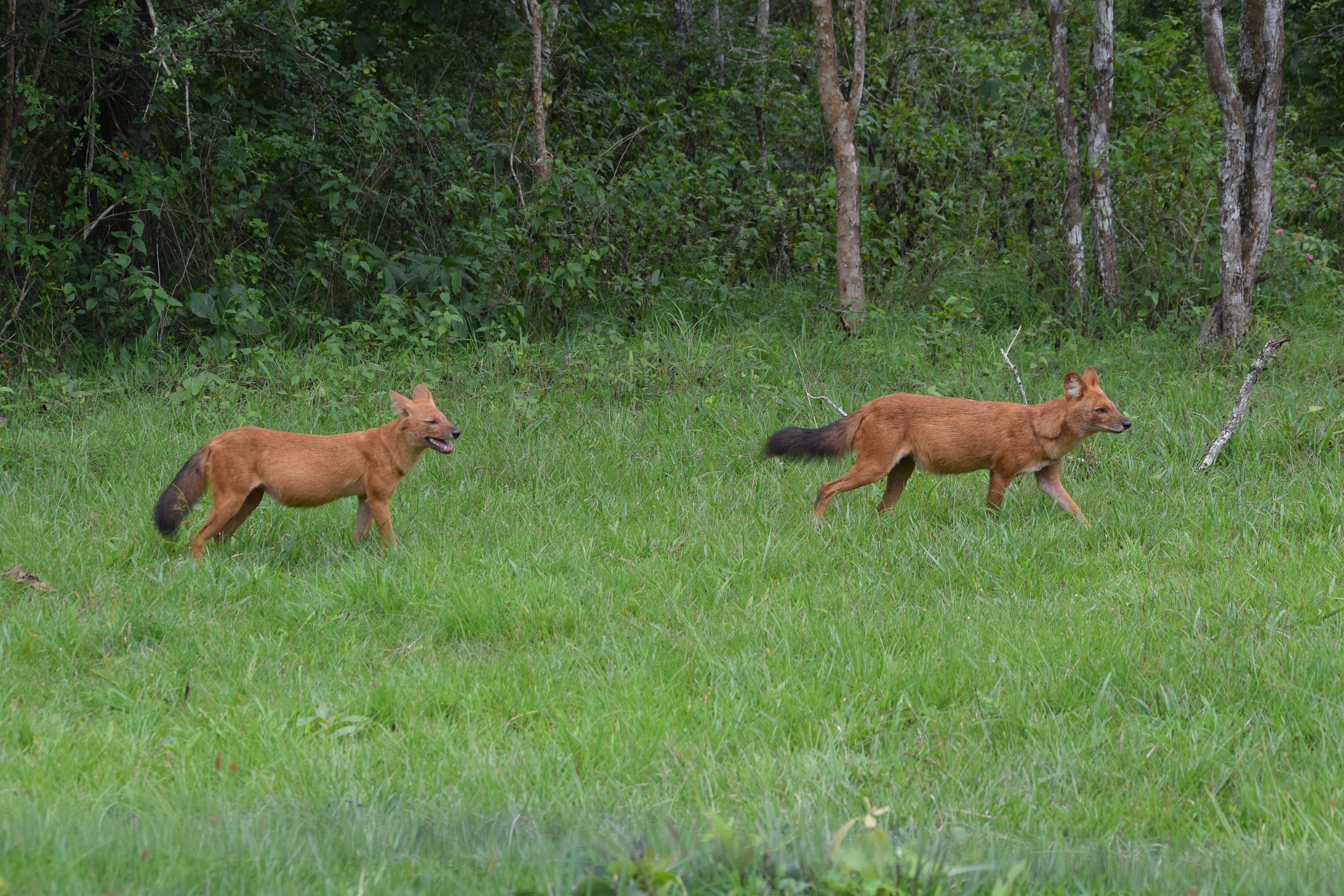

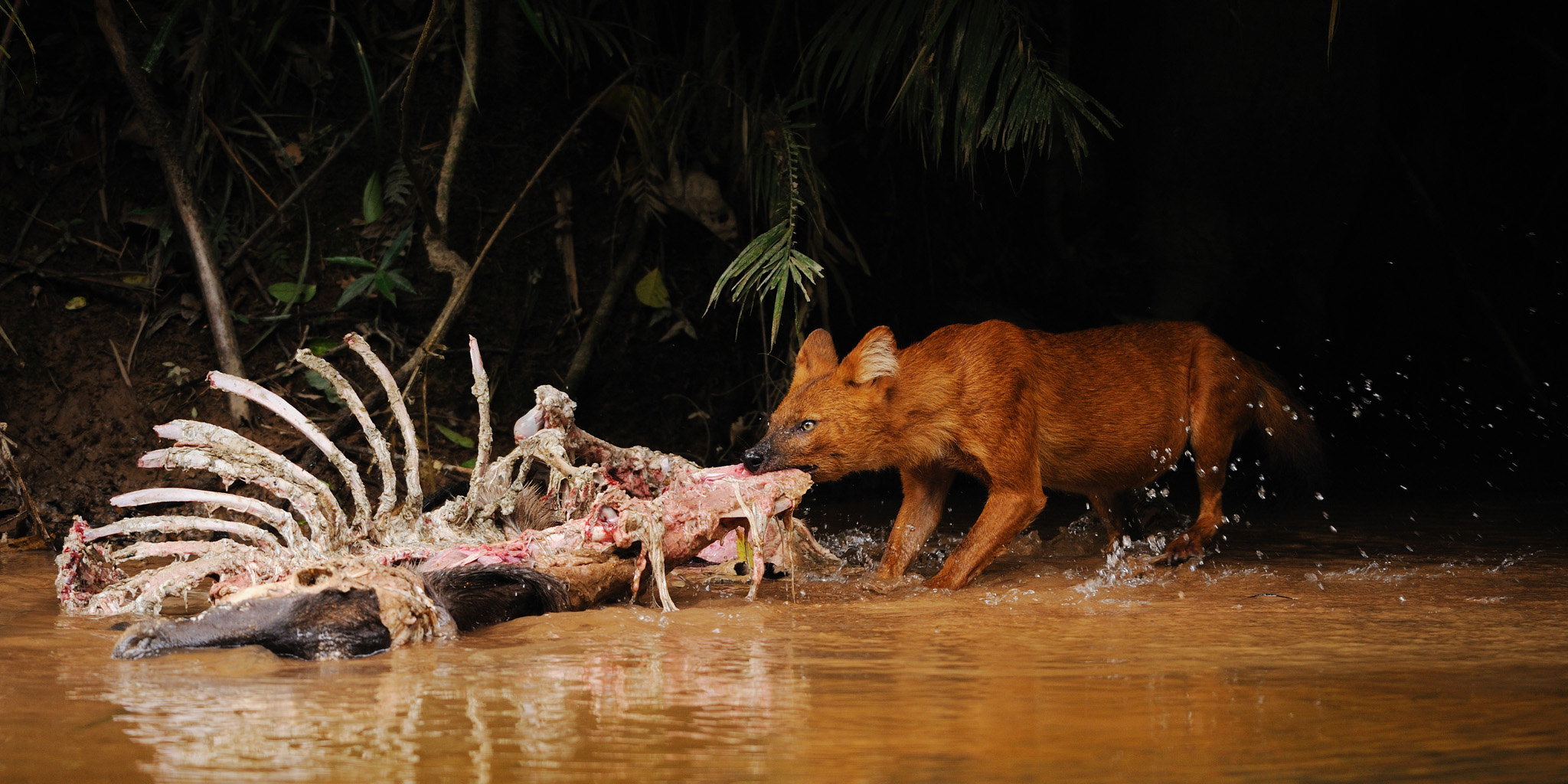

=== Family: Mustelidae ===
==== Genus: Aonyx ====
Species: Oriental small-clawed otter (Aonyx cinereus) VU/

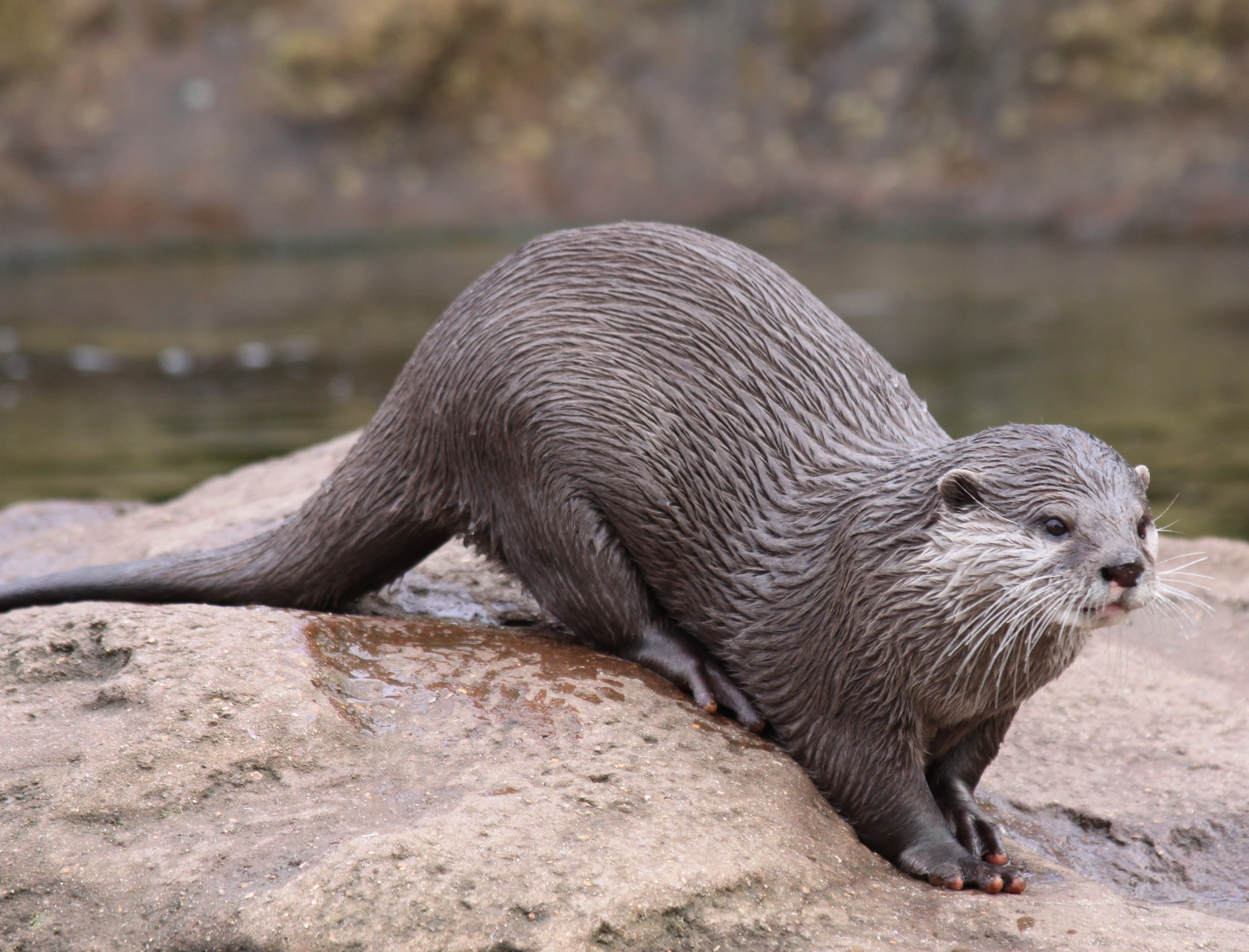

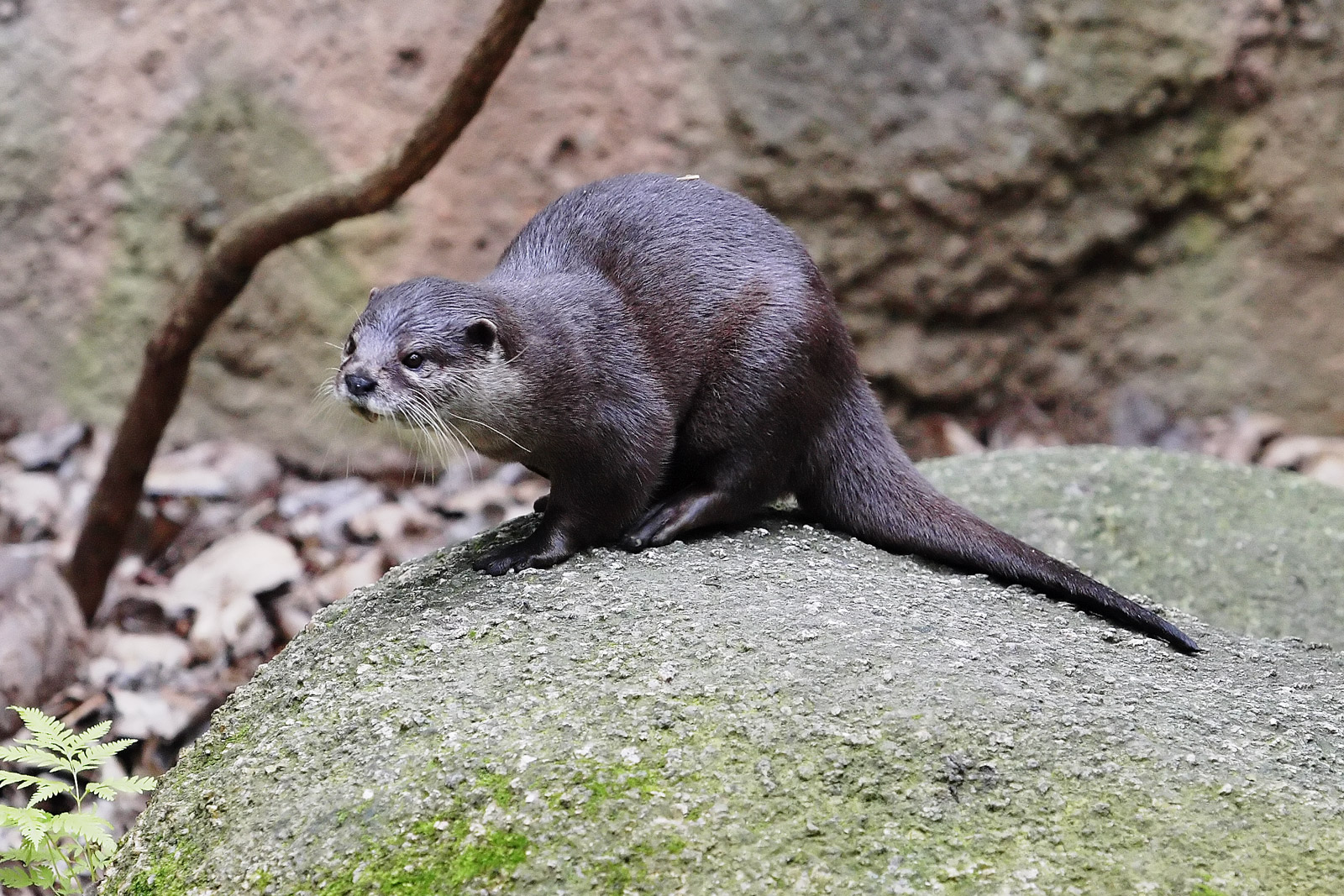

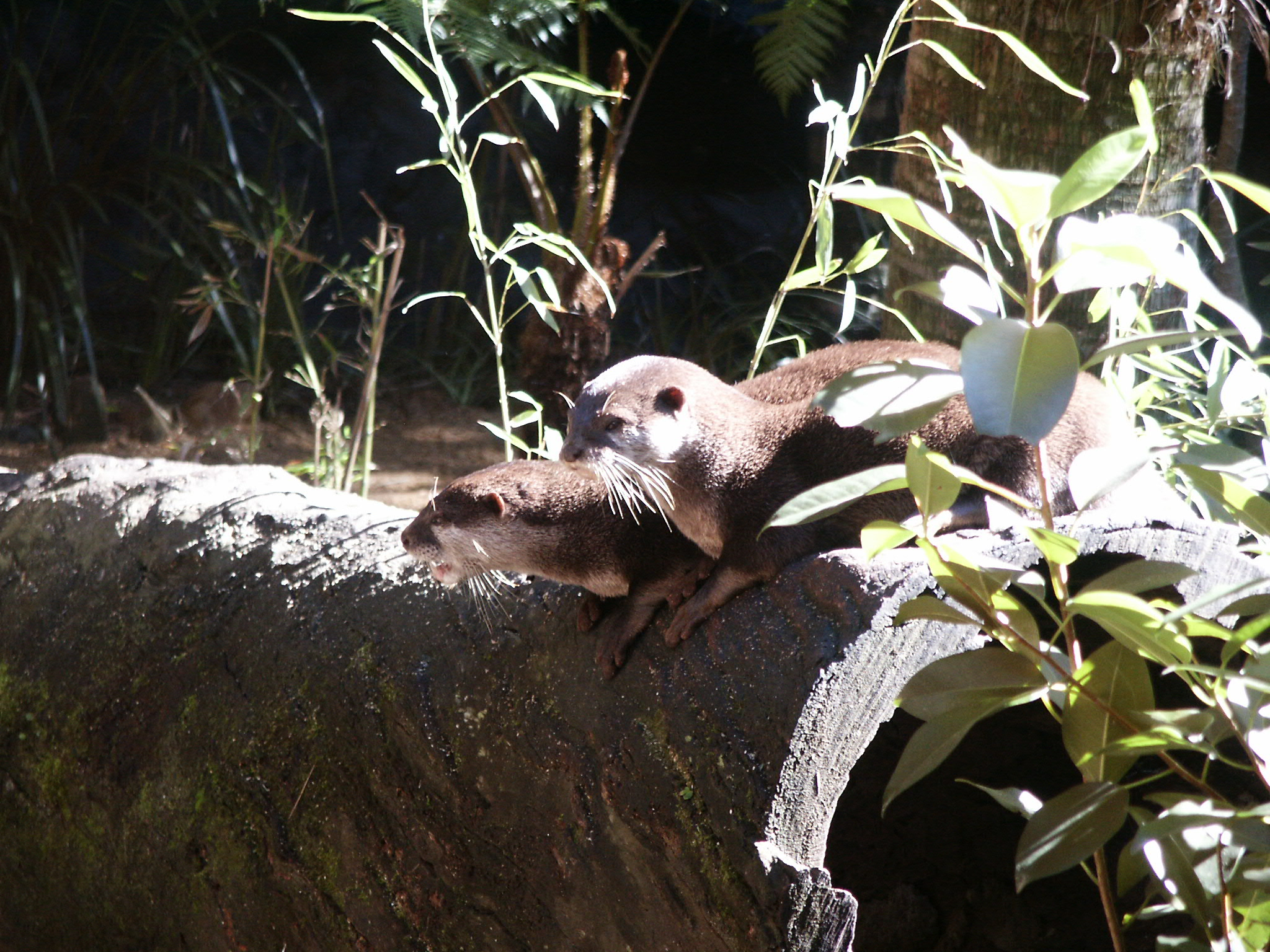

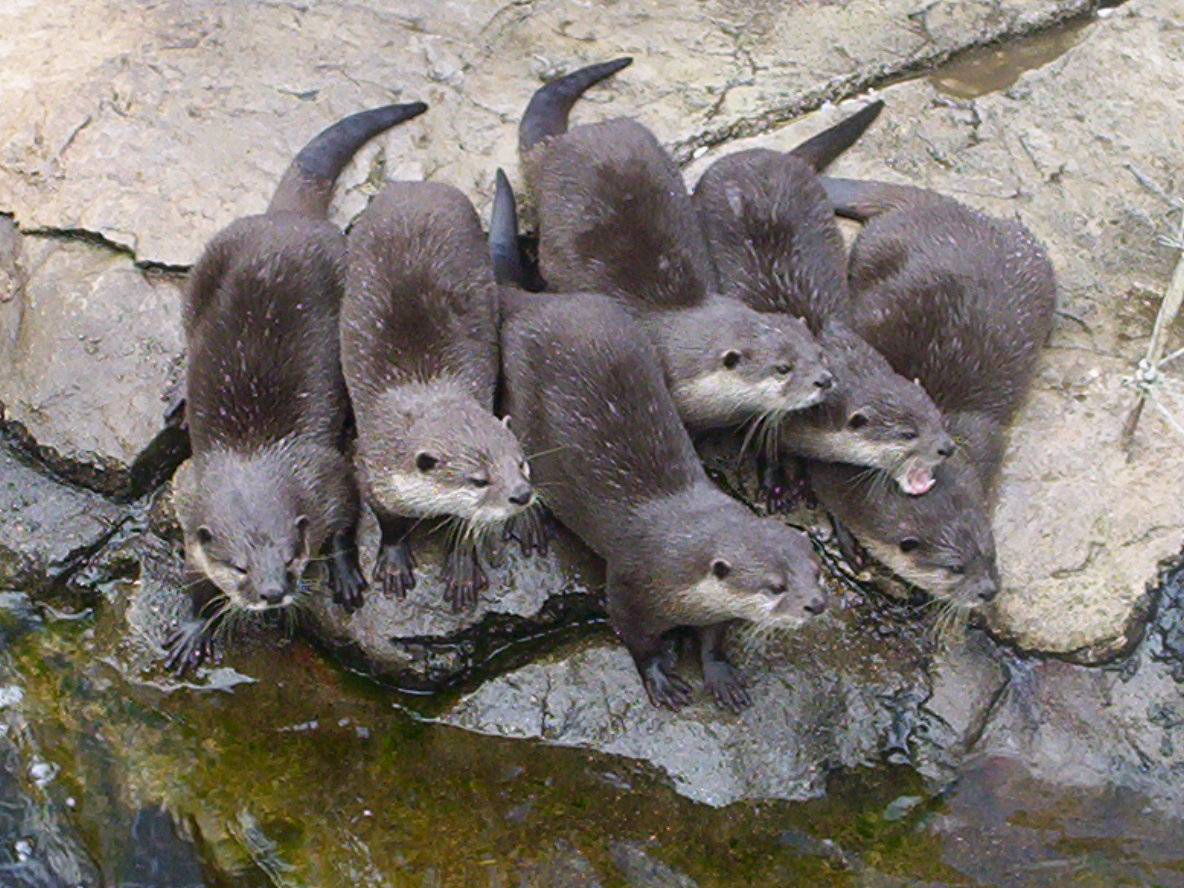

==== Genus: Arctonyx ====
Species: Sumatran hog badger (Arctonyx hoevenii) LC/

==== Genus: Lutra ====
Species:

- Eurasian otter (Lutra lutra) EN/
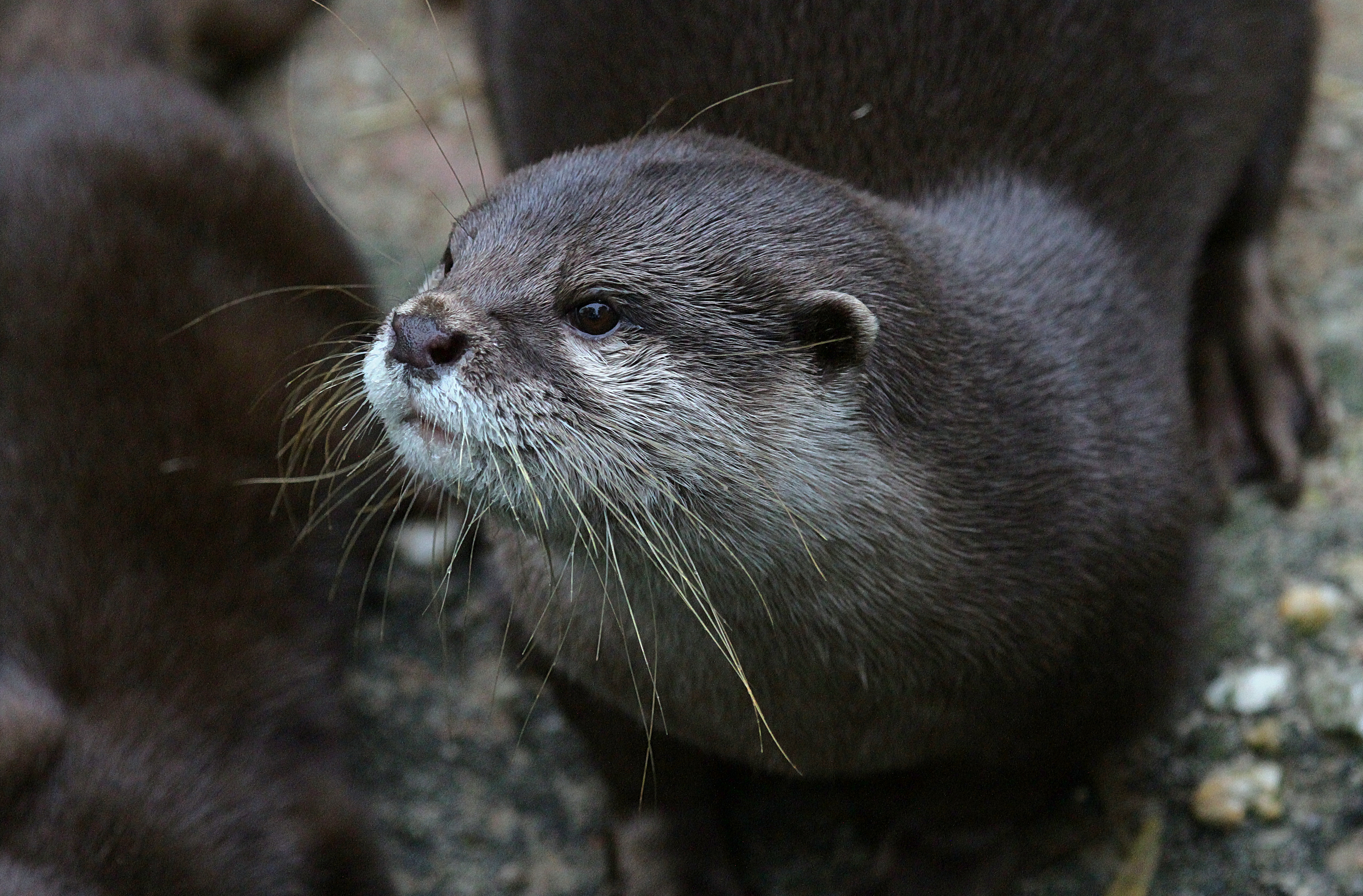

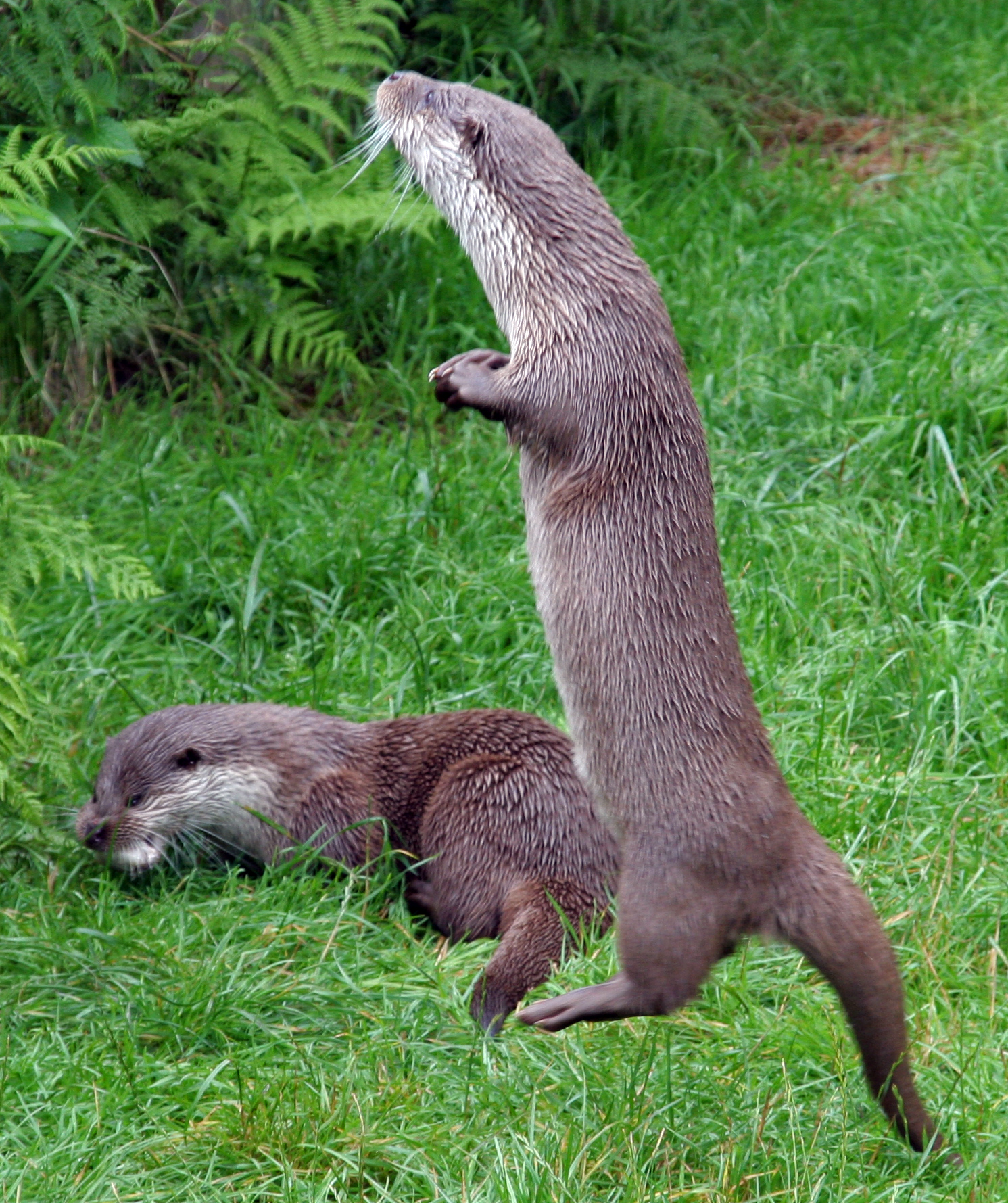
- Hairy-nosed otter (Lutra sumatrana) EN/
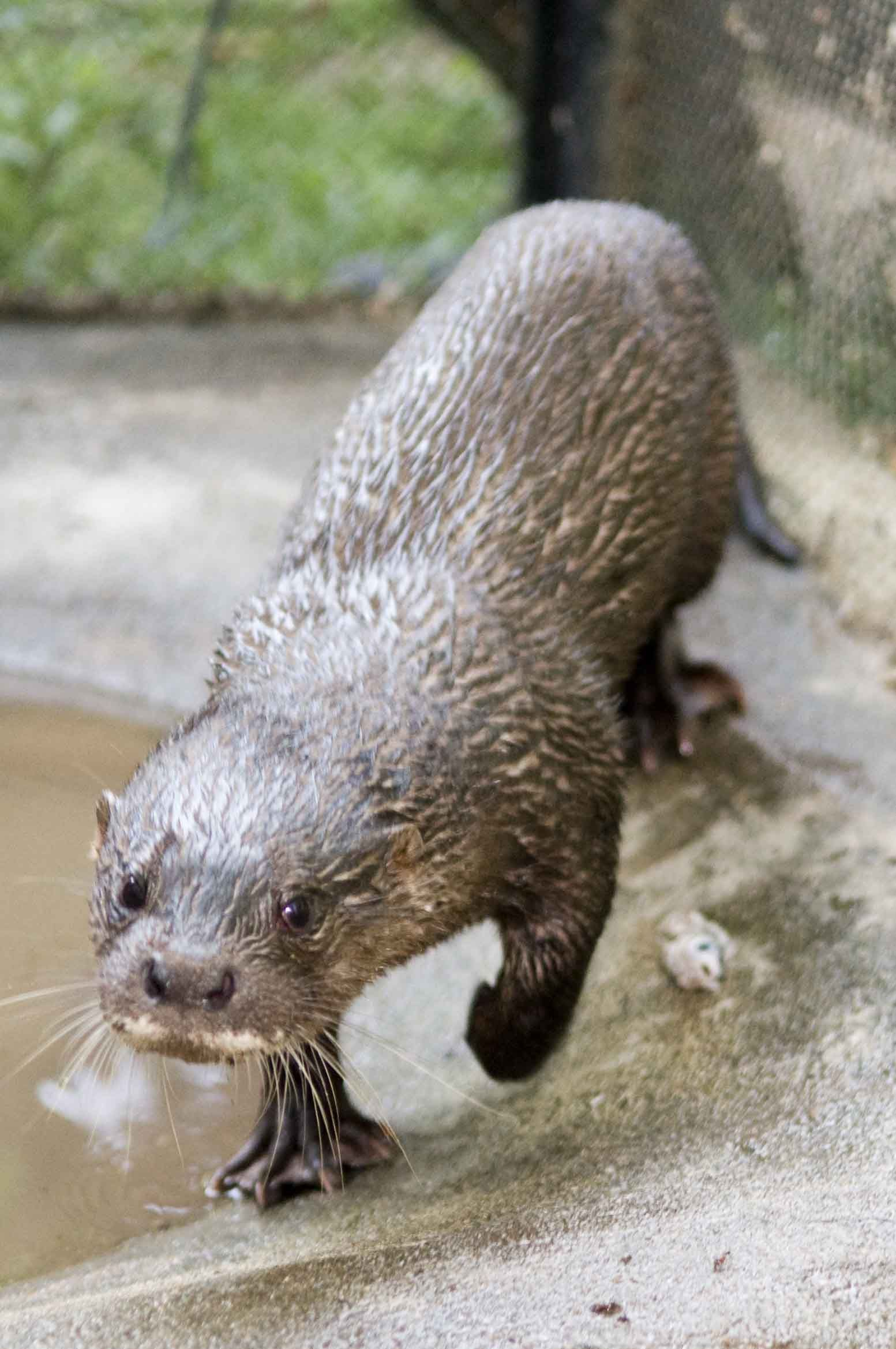

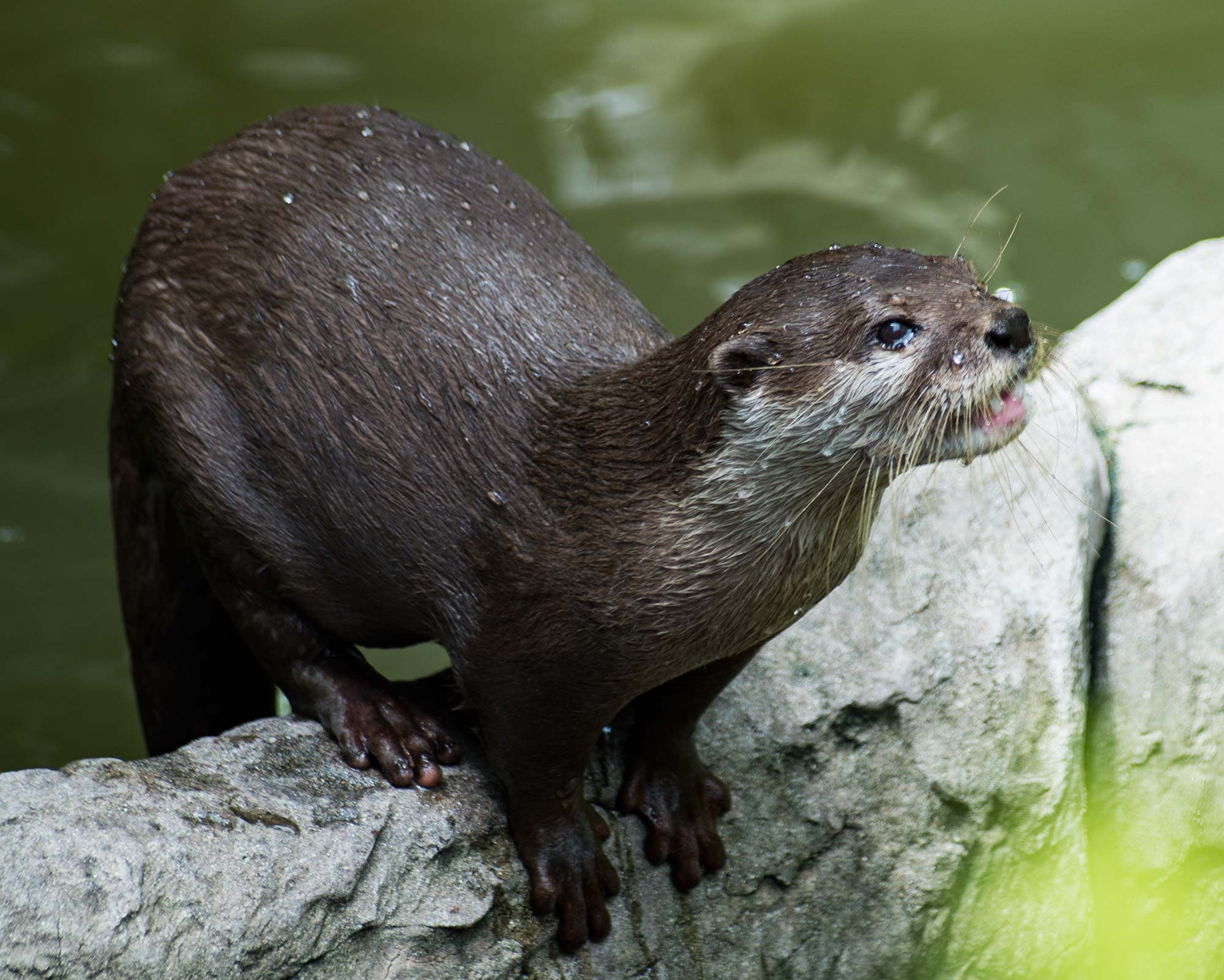

==== Genus: Lutrogale ====
Species: Smooth-coated otter (Lutrogale perspicillata) VU/

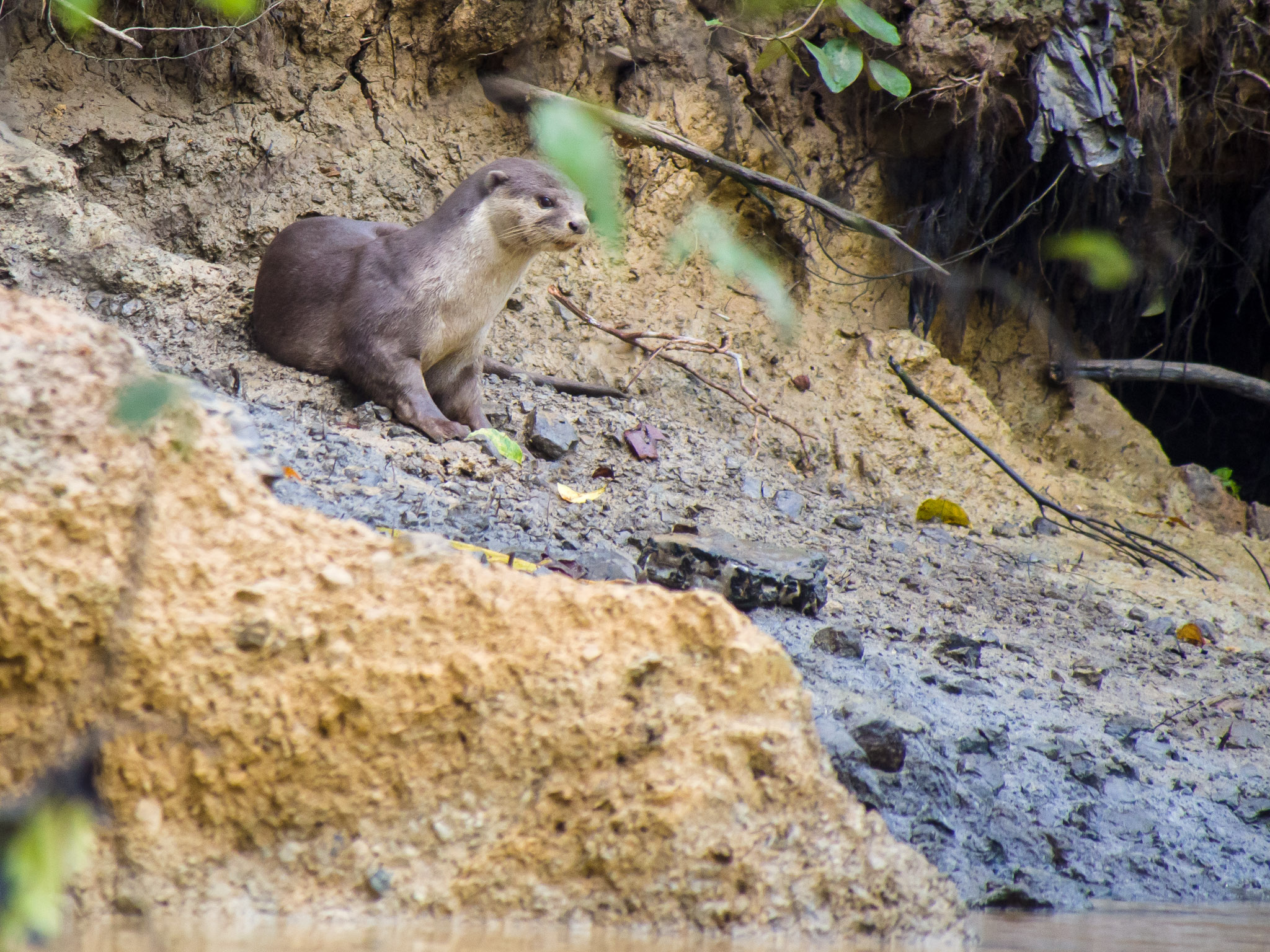

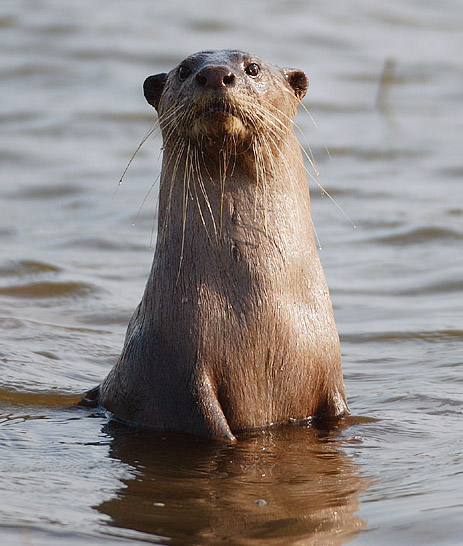

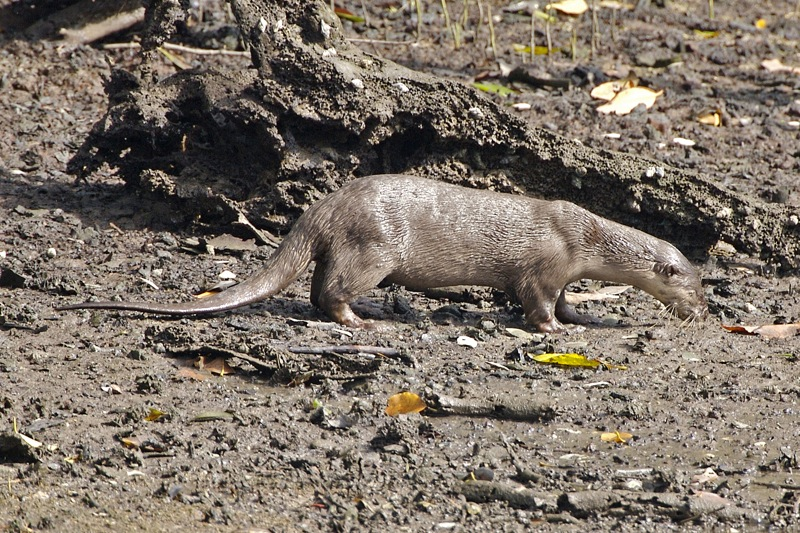

==== Genus: Martes ====
Species: Yellow-throated marten (Martes flavigula) LC/

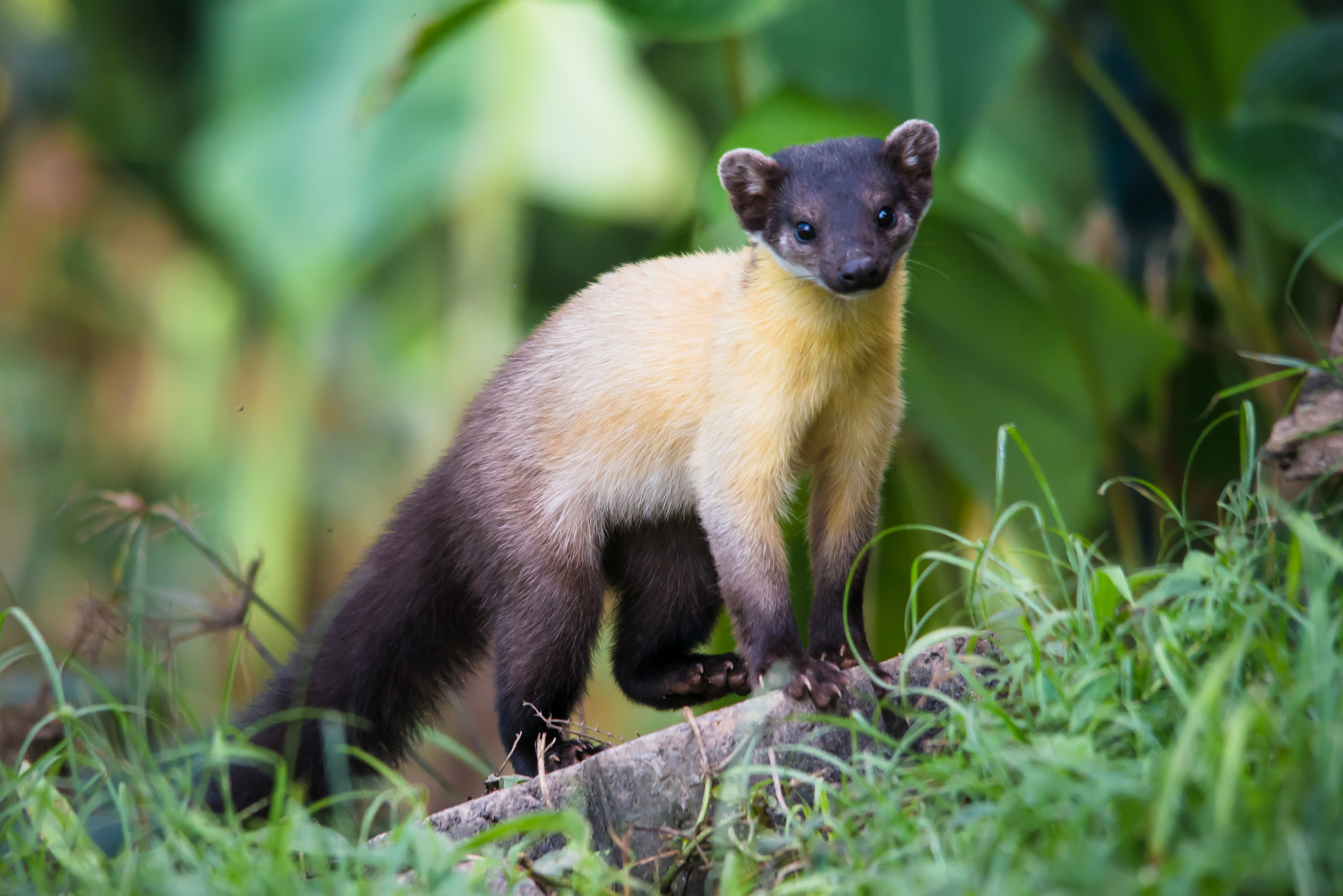

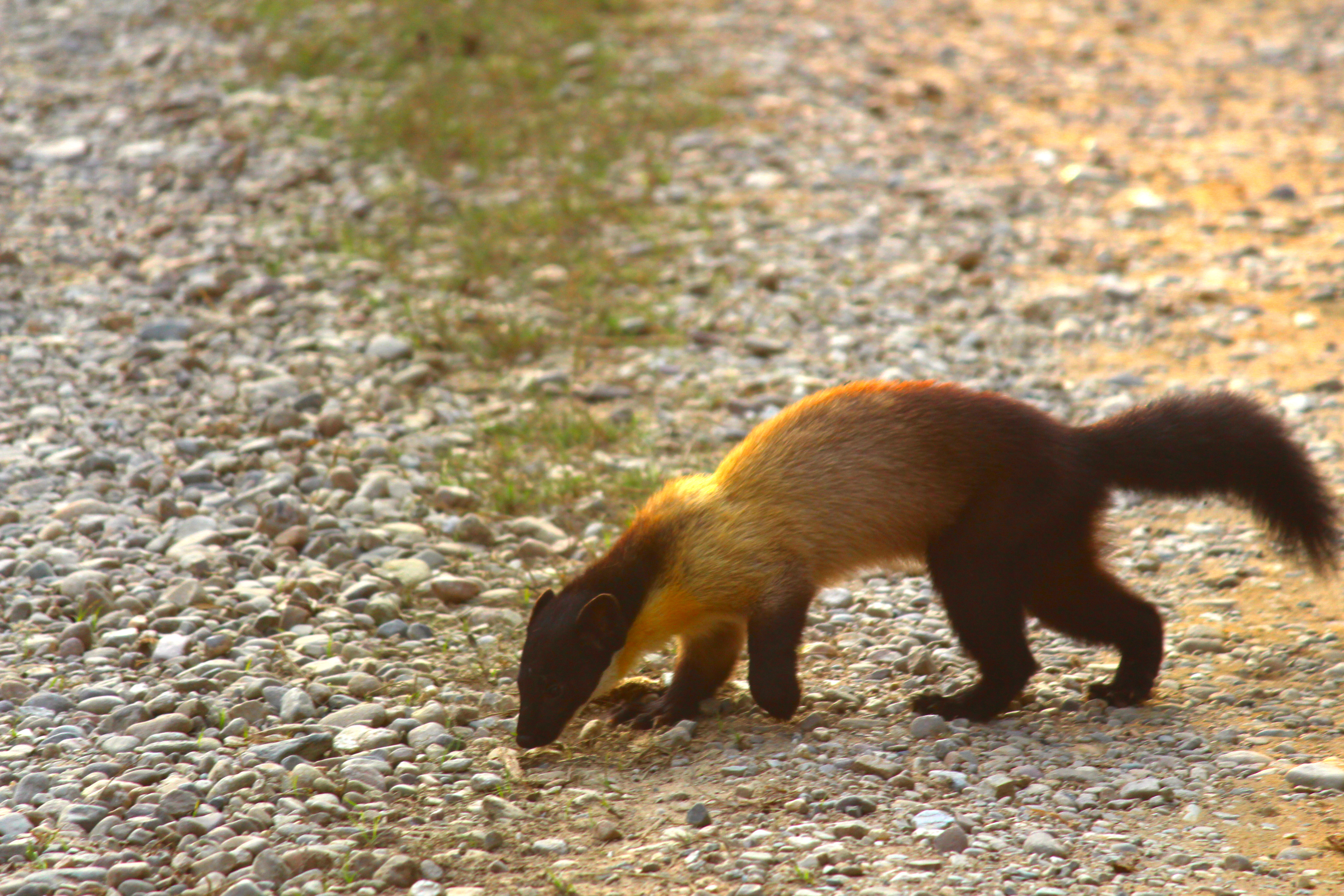

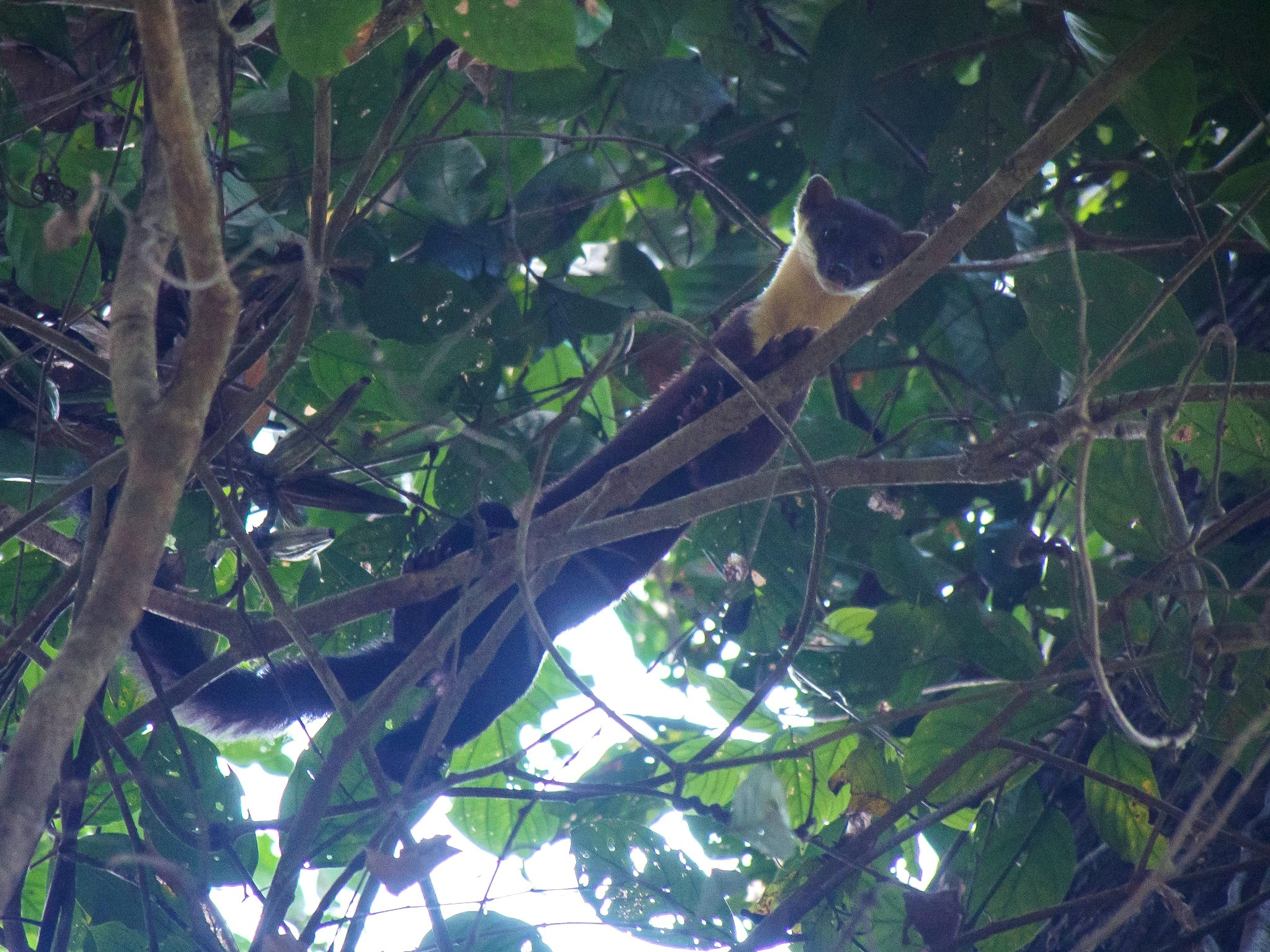

==== Genus: Mustela ====
Species:

- Indonesian mountain weasel (Mustela lutreolina) DD/
- Malayan weasel (Mustela nudipes) LC/

=== Family: Mephitidae ===
==== Genus: Mydaus ====
Species: Sunda stink badger (Mydaus javanensis) LC/

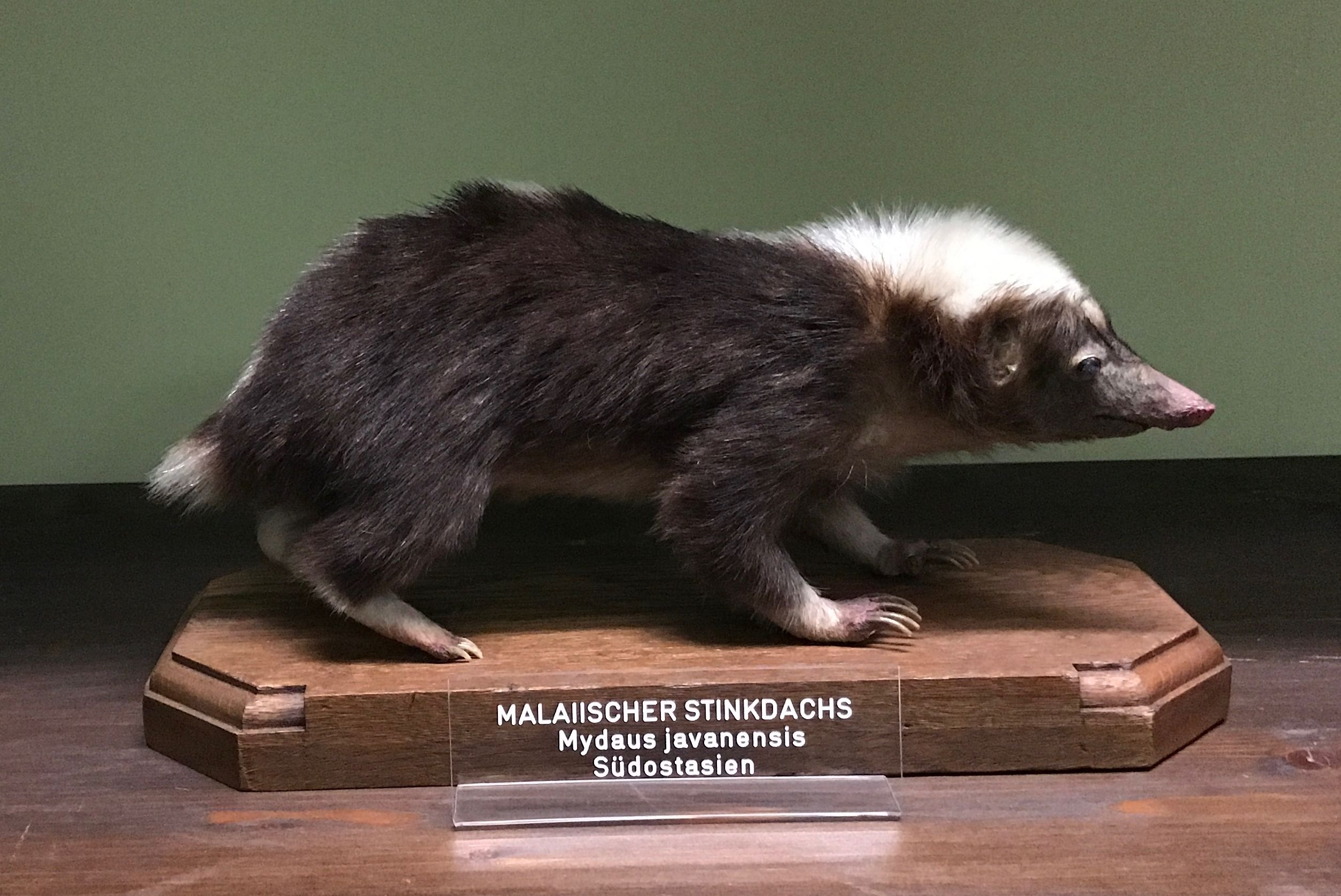

== Order: Perissodactyla ==
=== Family: Rhinocerotidae ===
==== Genus: Dicerorhinus ====
Species: Sumatran rhinoceros (Dicerorhinus sumatrensis) CR/cr

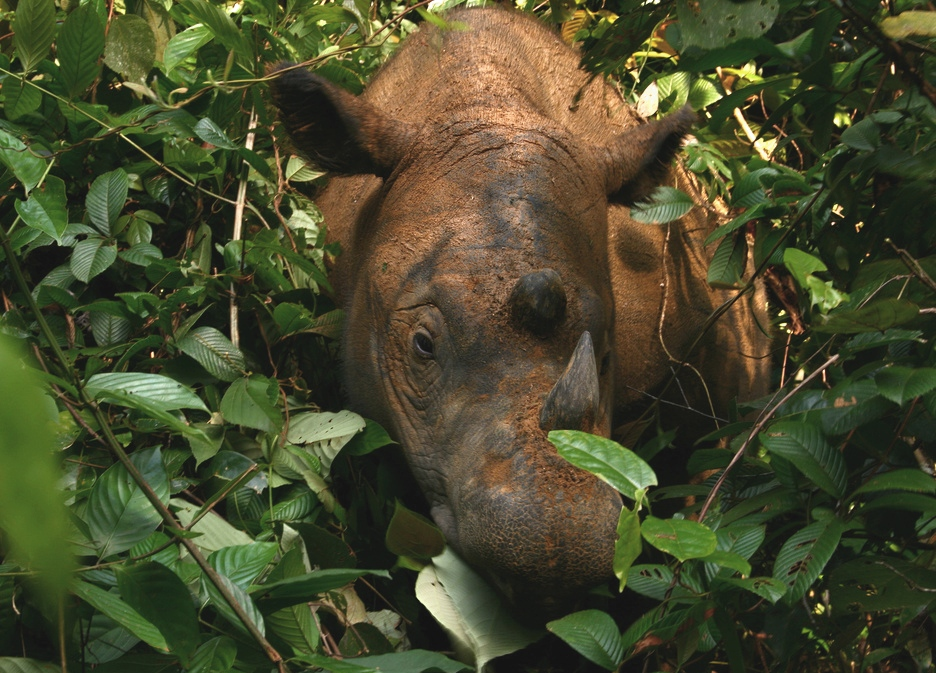

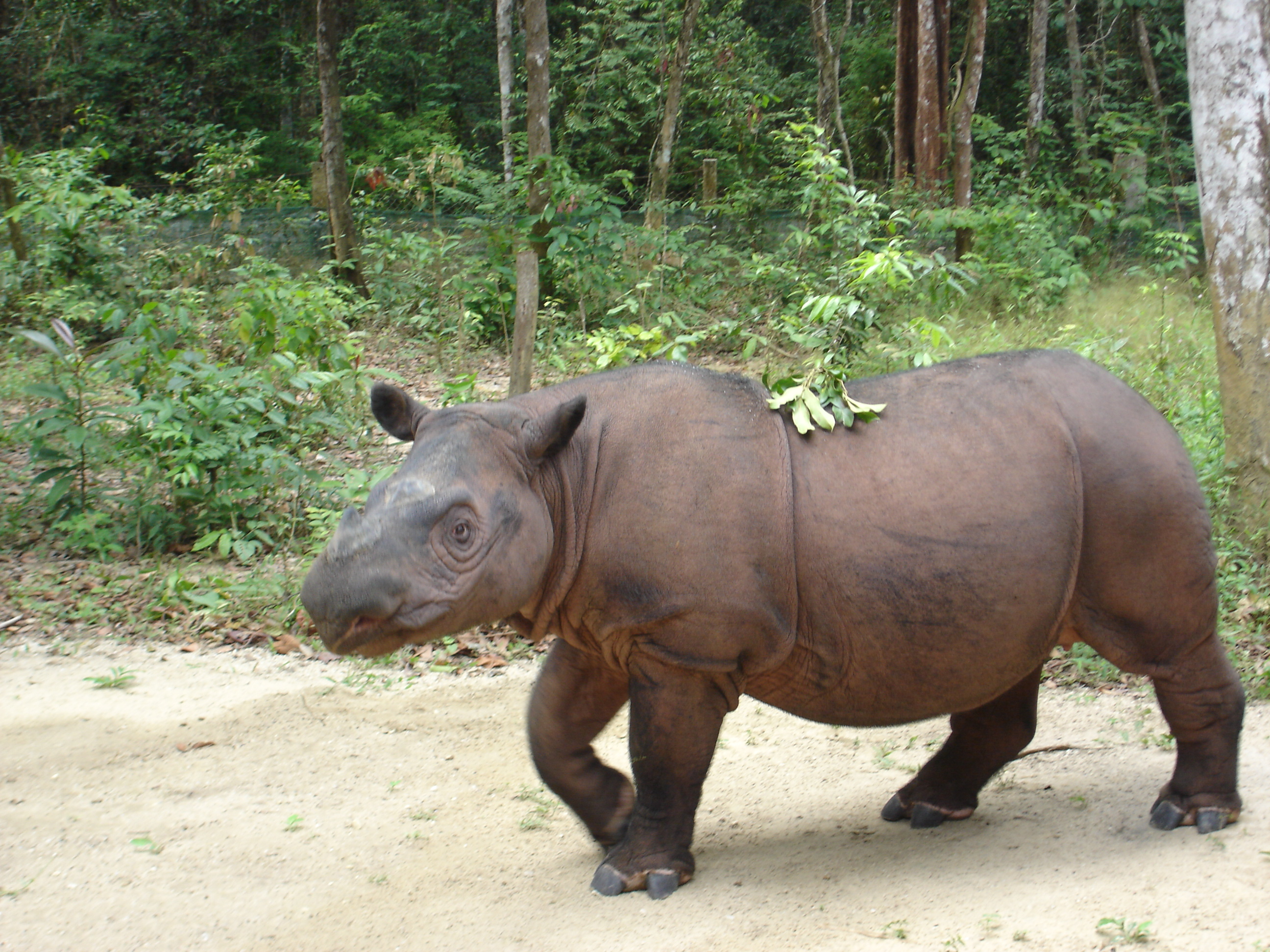

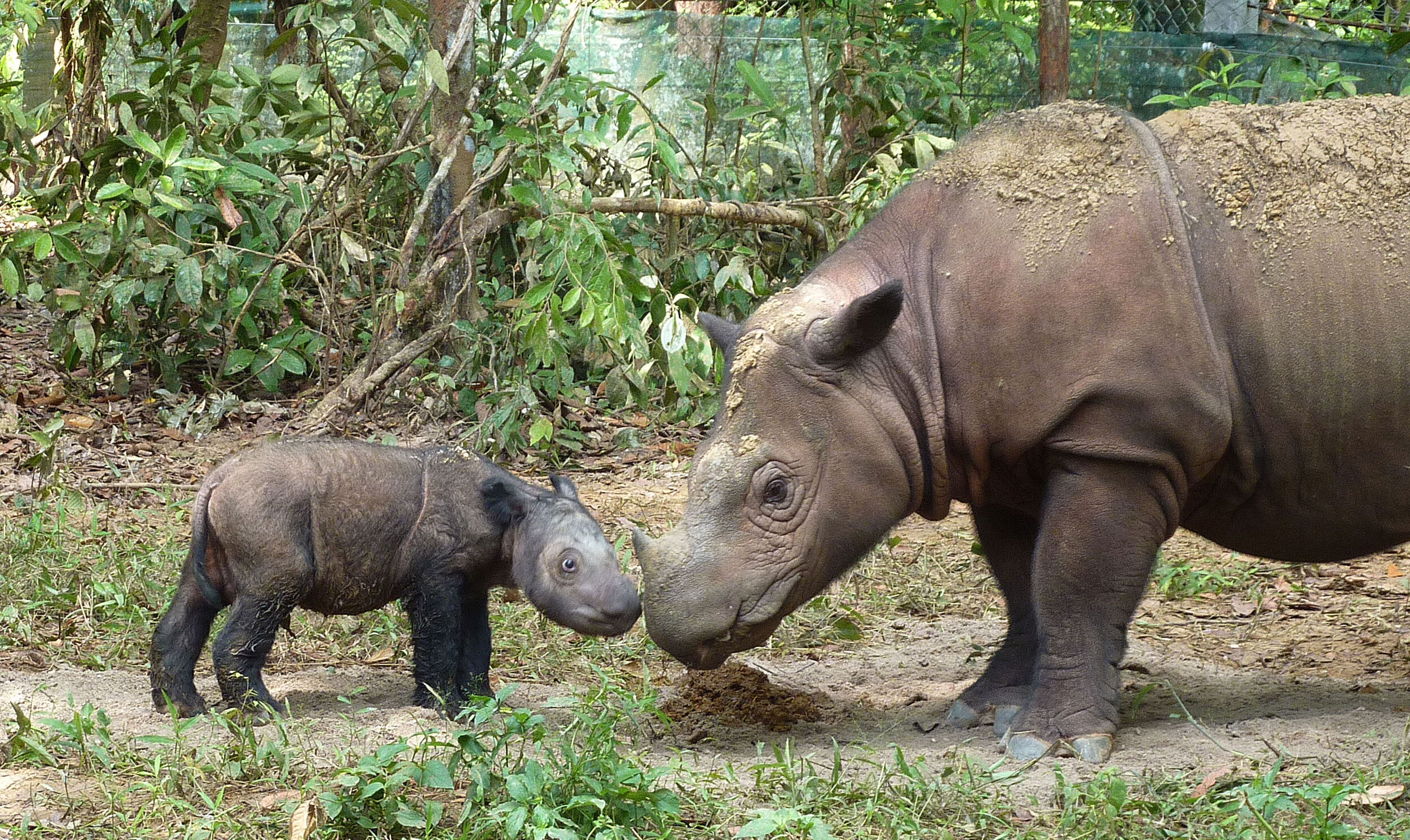

=== Family: Tapiridae ===
==== Genus: Tapirus ====
Species: Malayan tapir (Tapirus indicus) EN/en

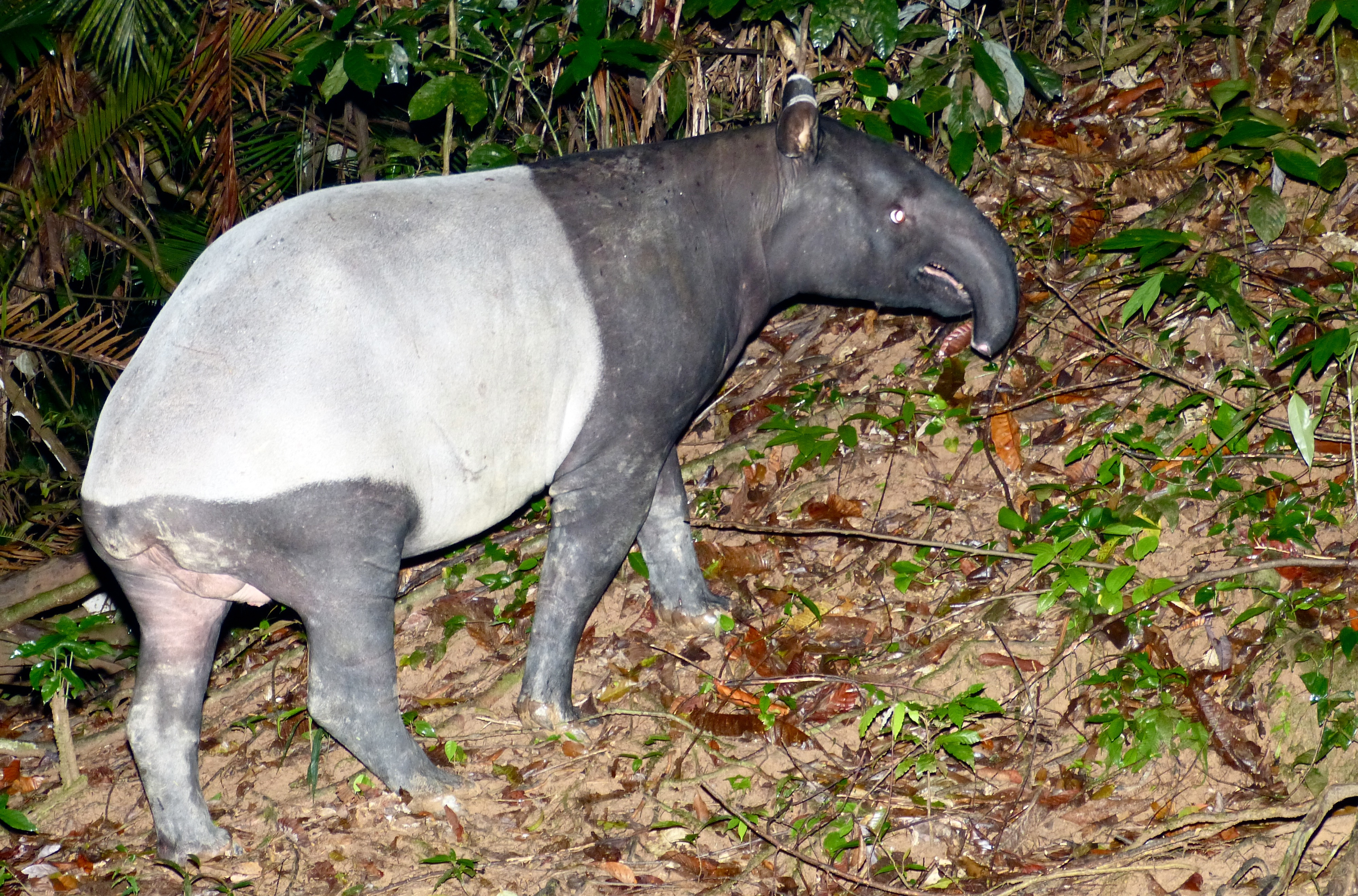

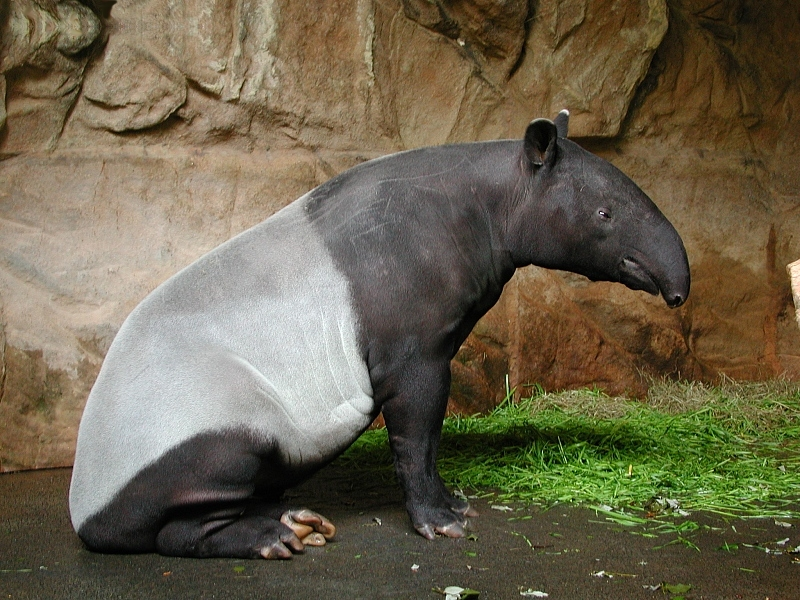

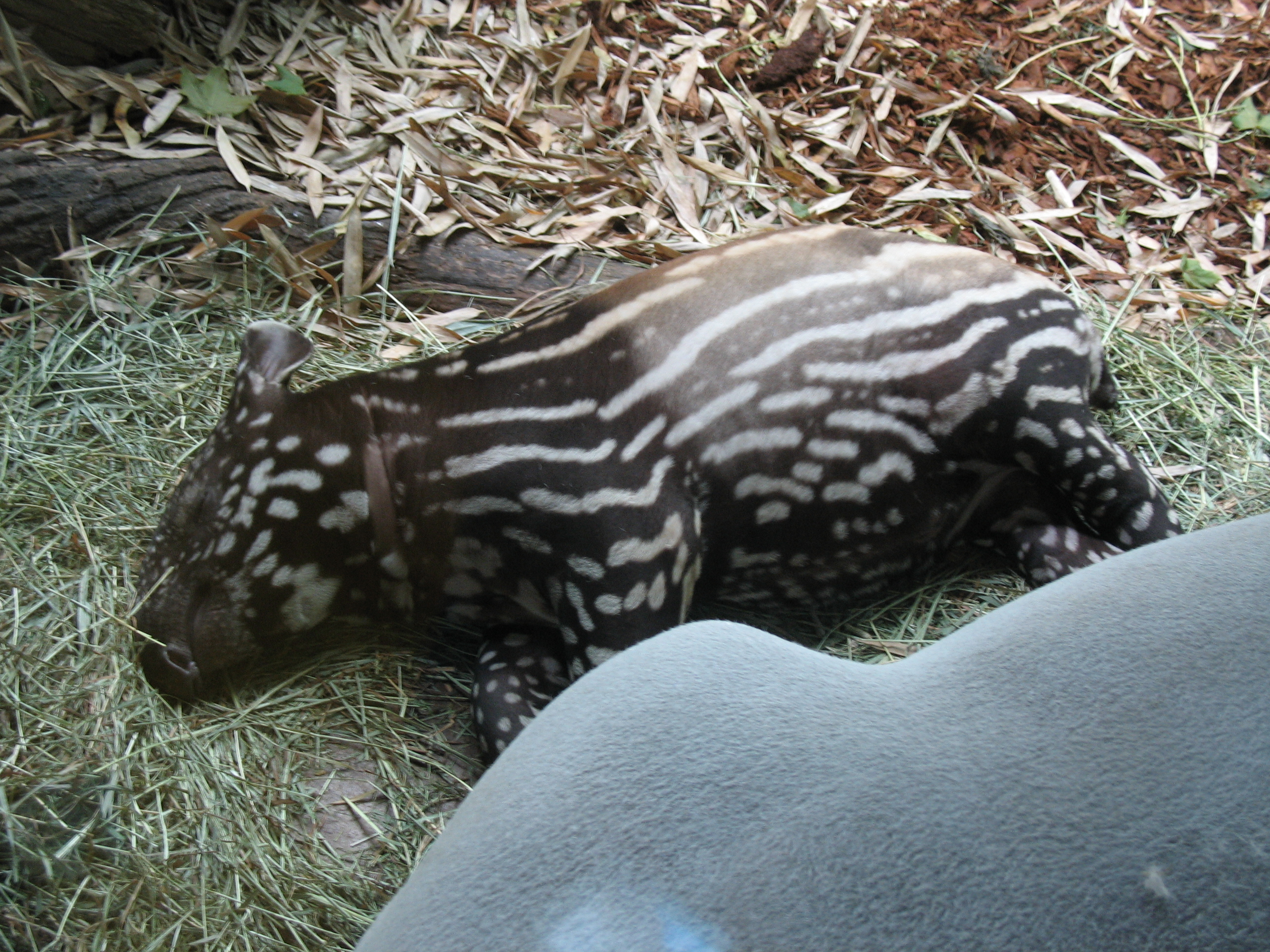

== Order: Artiodactyla ==
=== Family: Suidae ===
==== Genus: Sus ====
Species:

- Bornean bearded pig (Sus barbatus) VU/
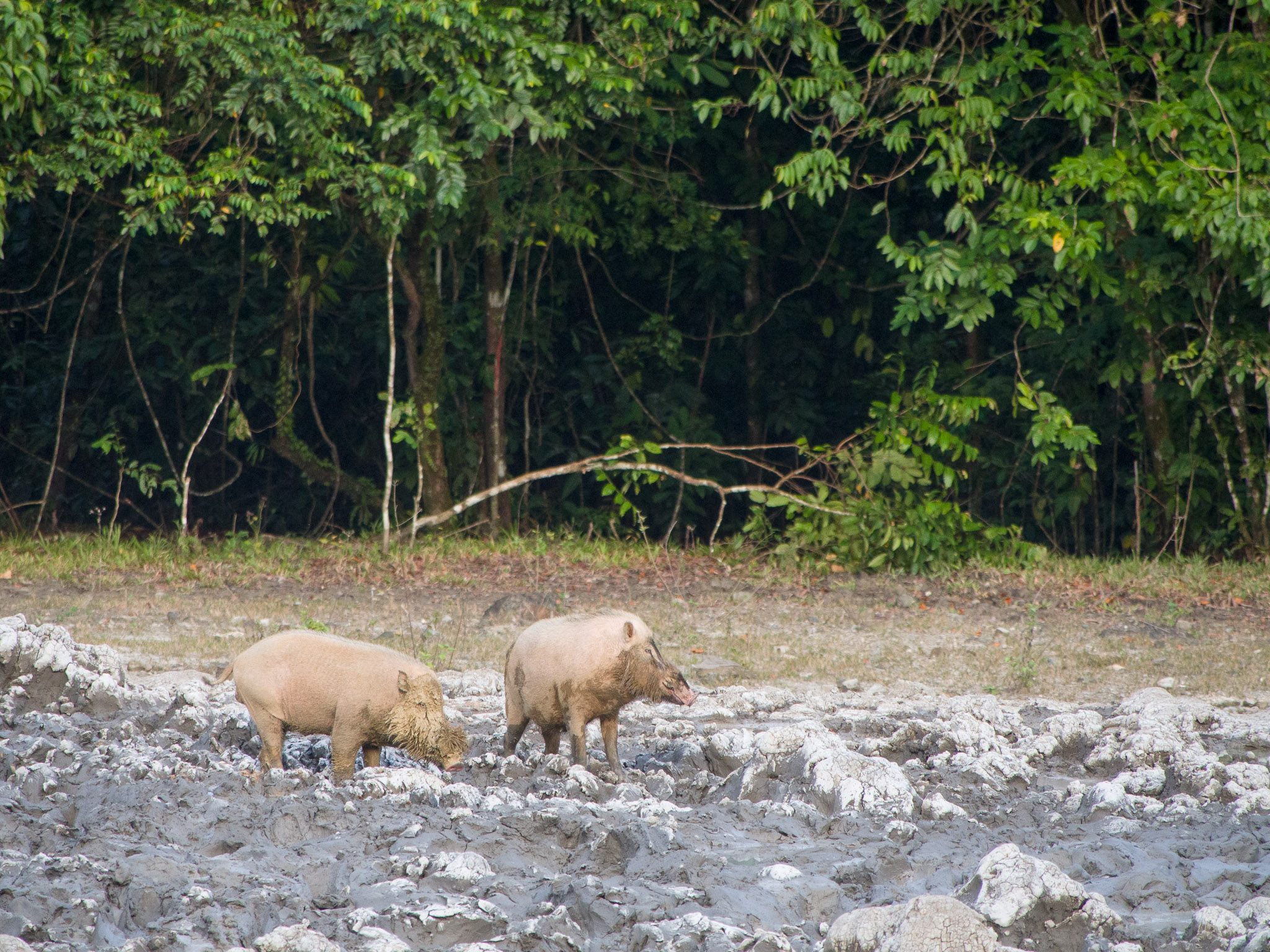

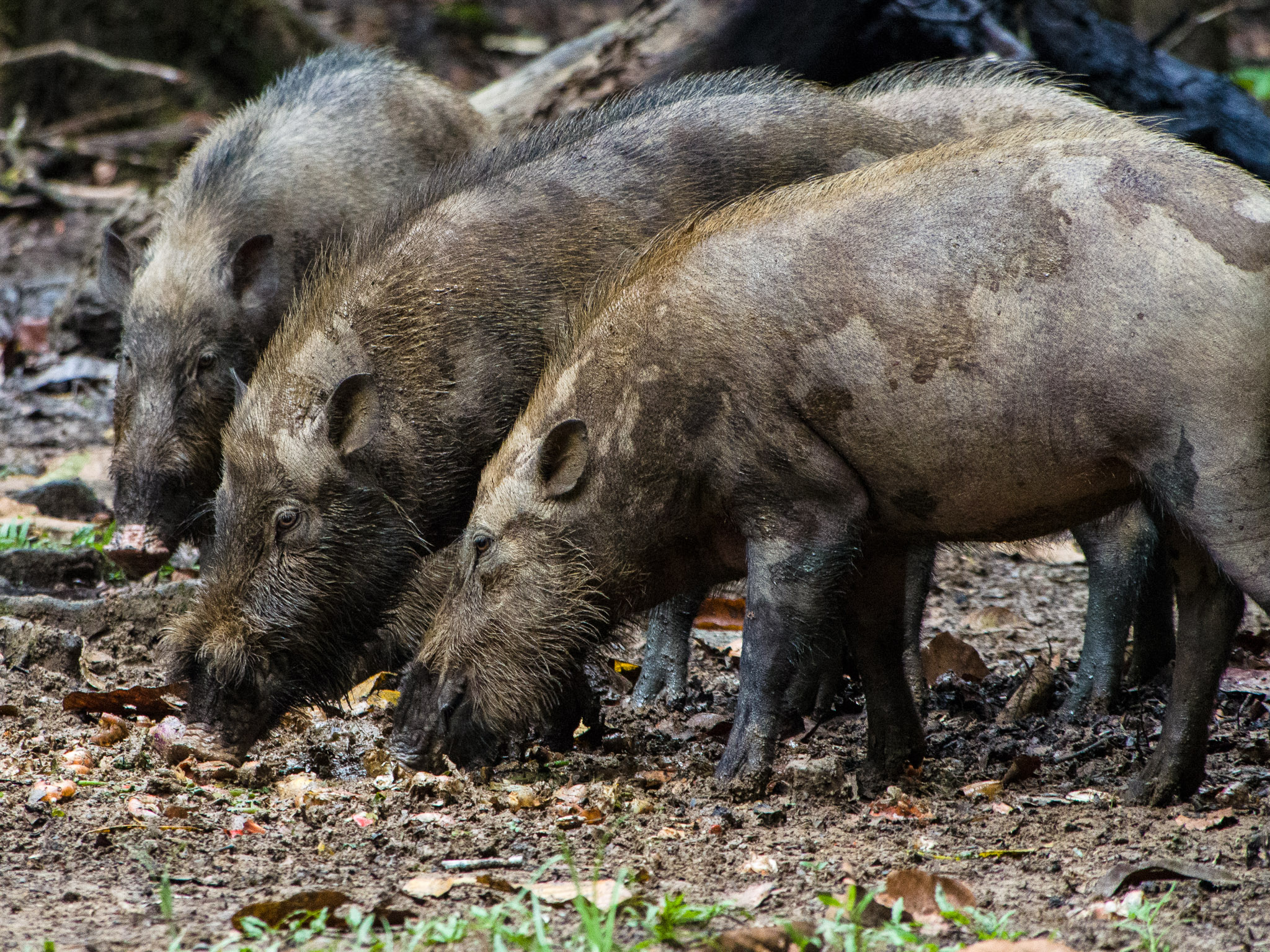

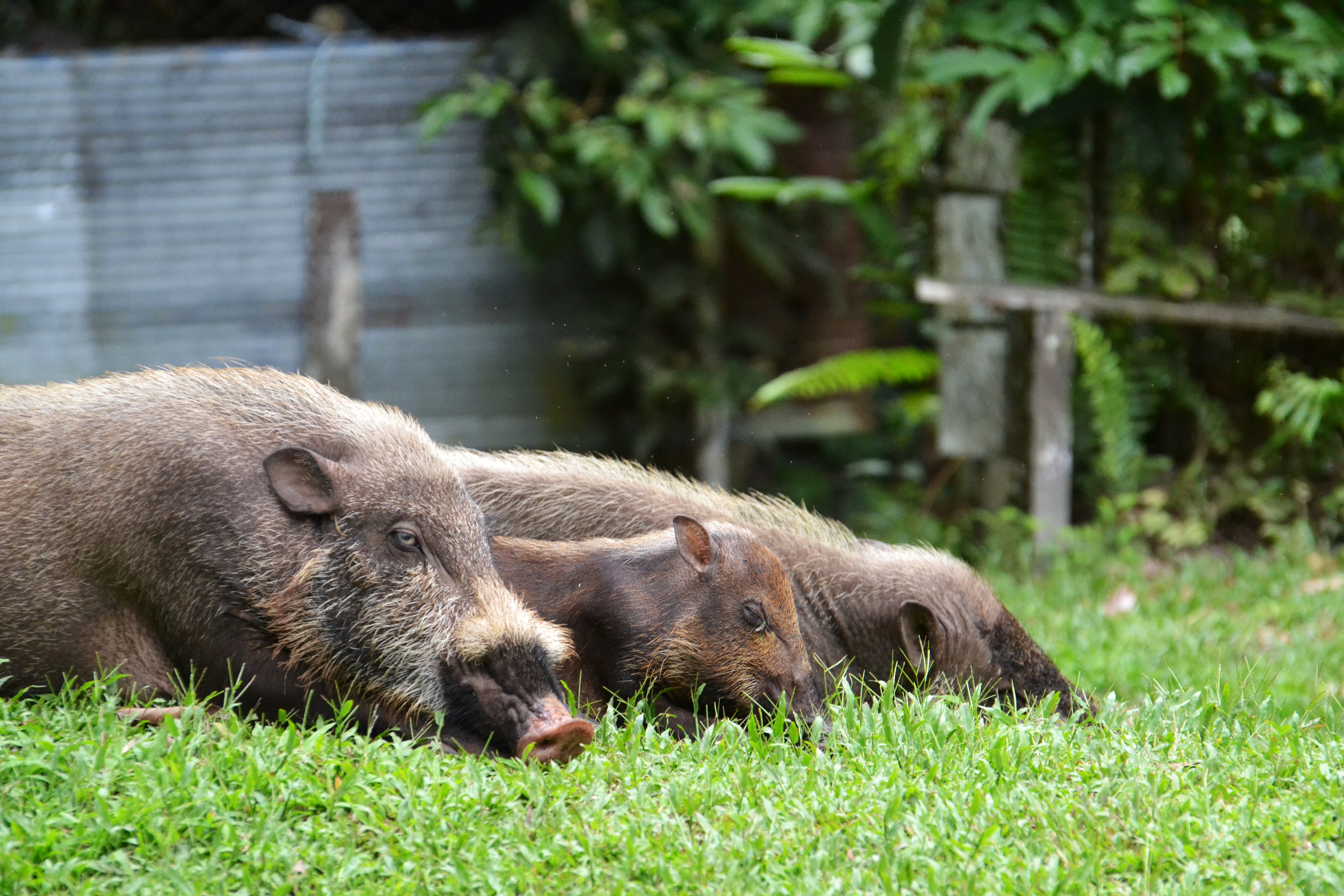
- Wild boar (Sus scrofa) LC/
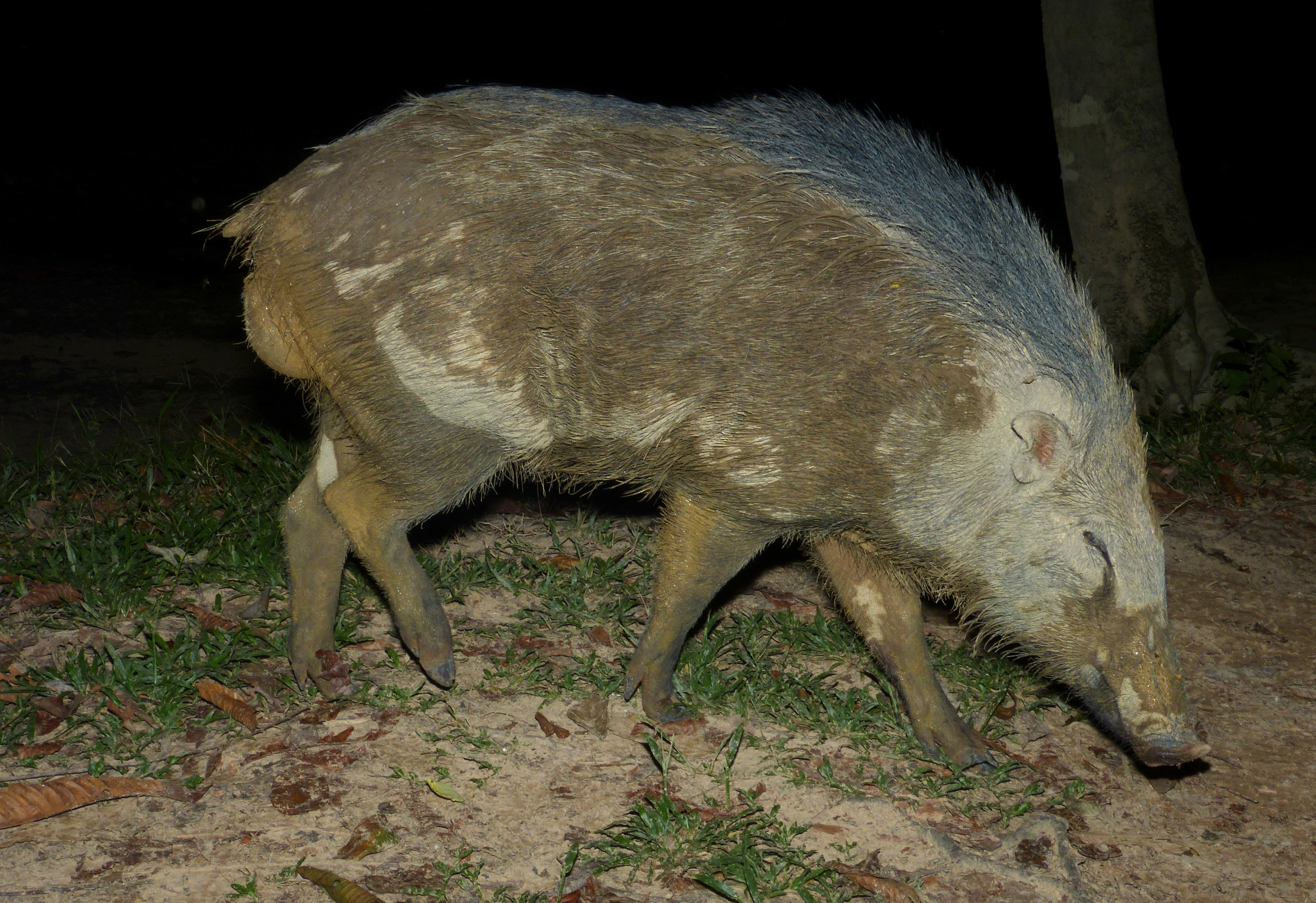

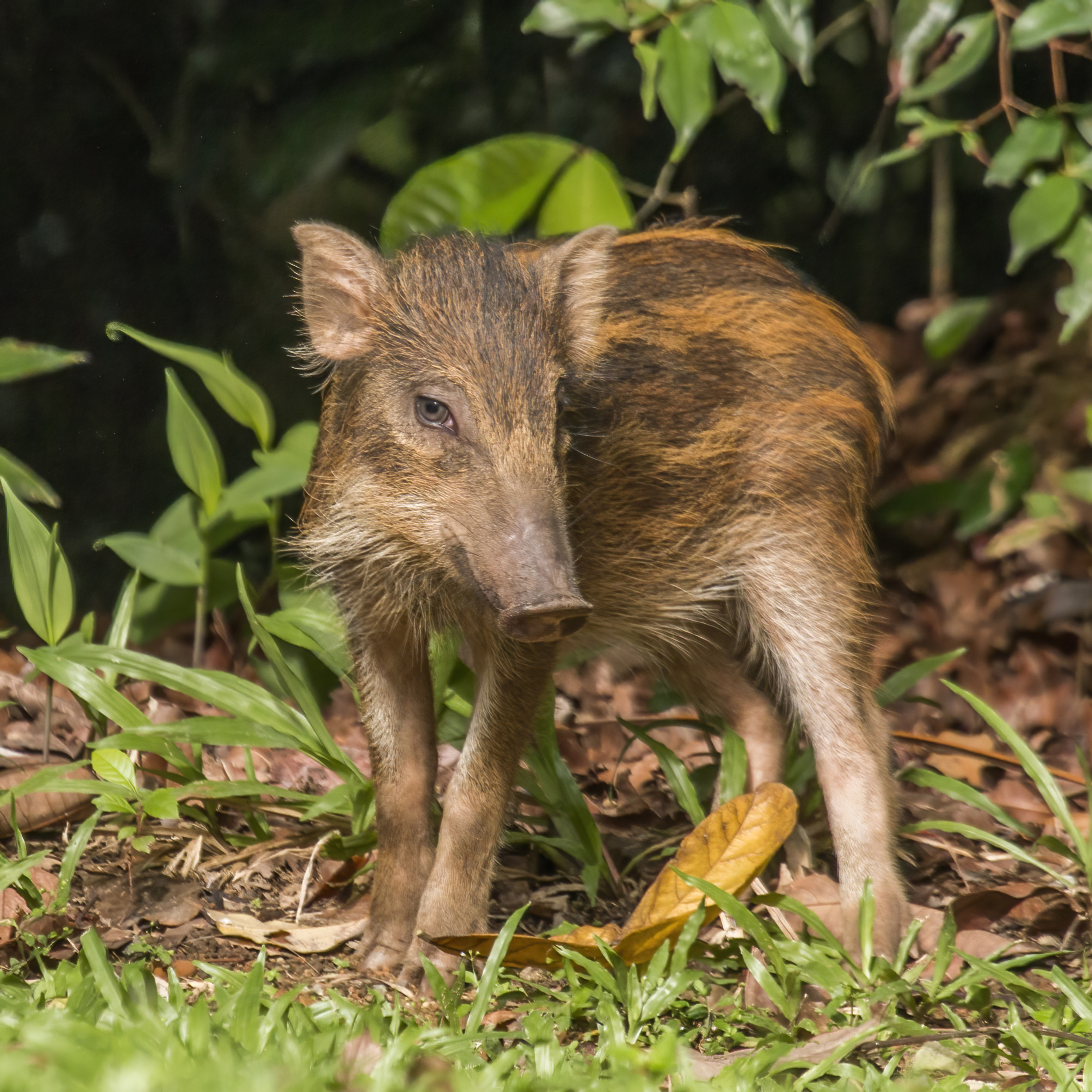

=== Family: Tragulidae ===
==== Genus: Tragulus ====
Species:

- Lesser mouse-deer (Tragulus kanchil) LC/
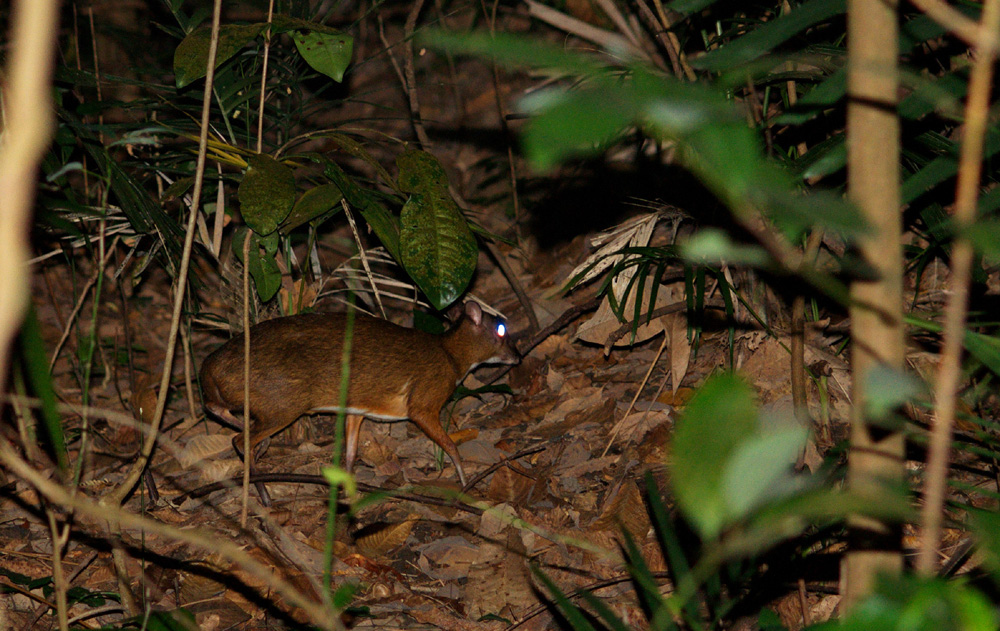

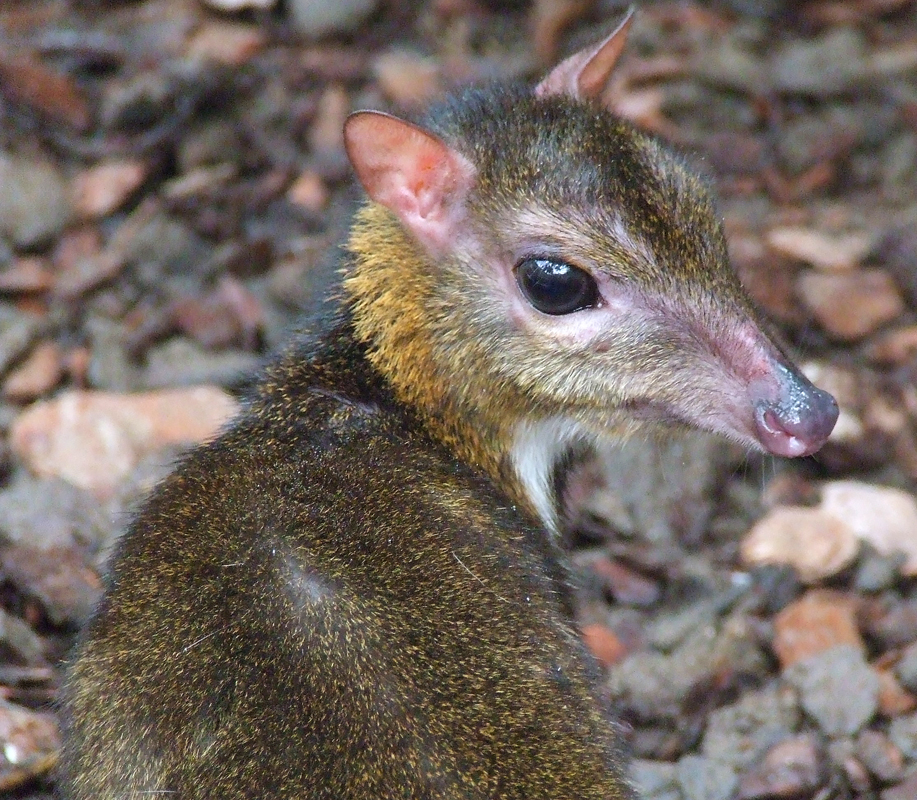

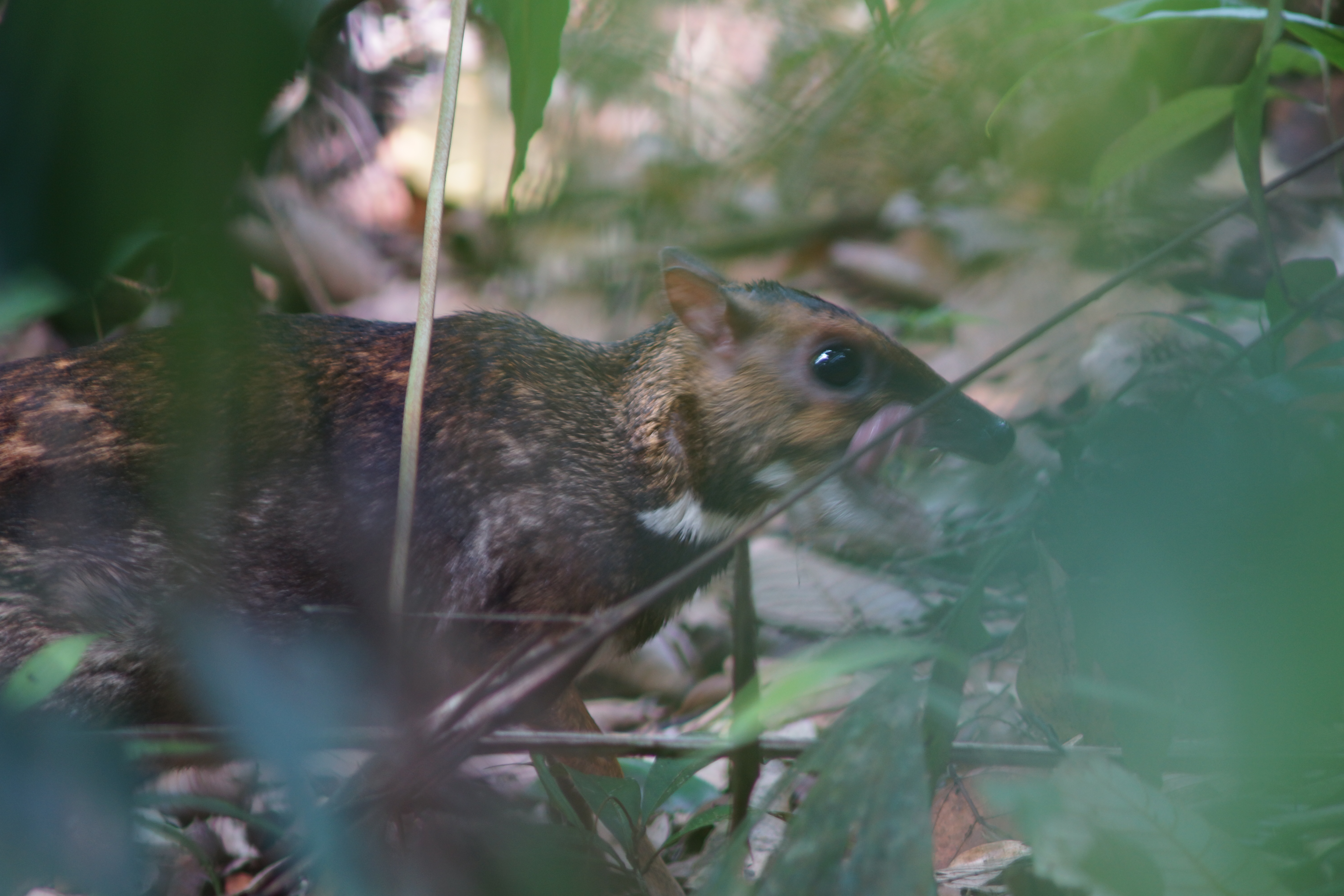
- Greater mouse-deer (Tragulus napu) LC/
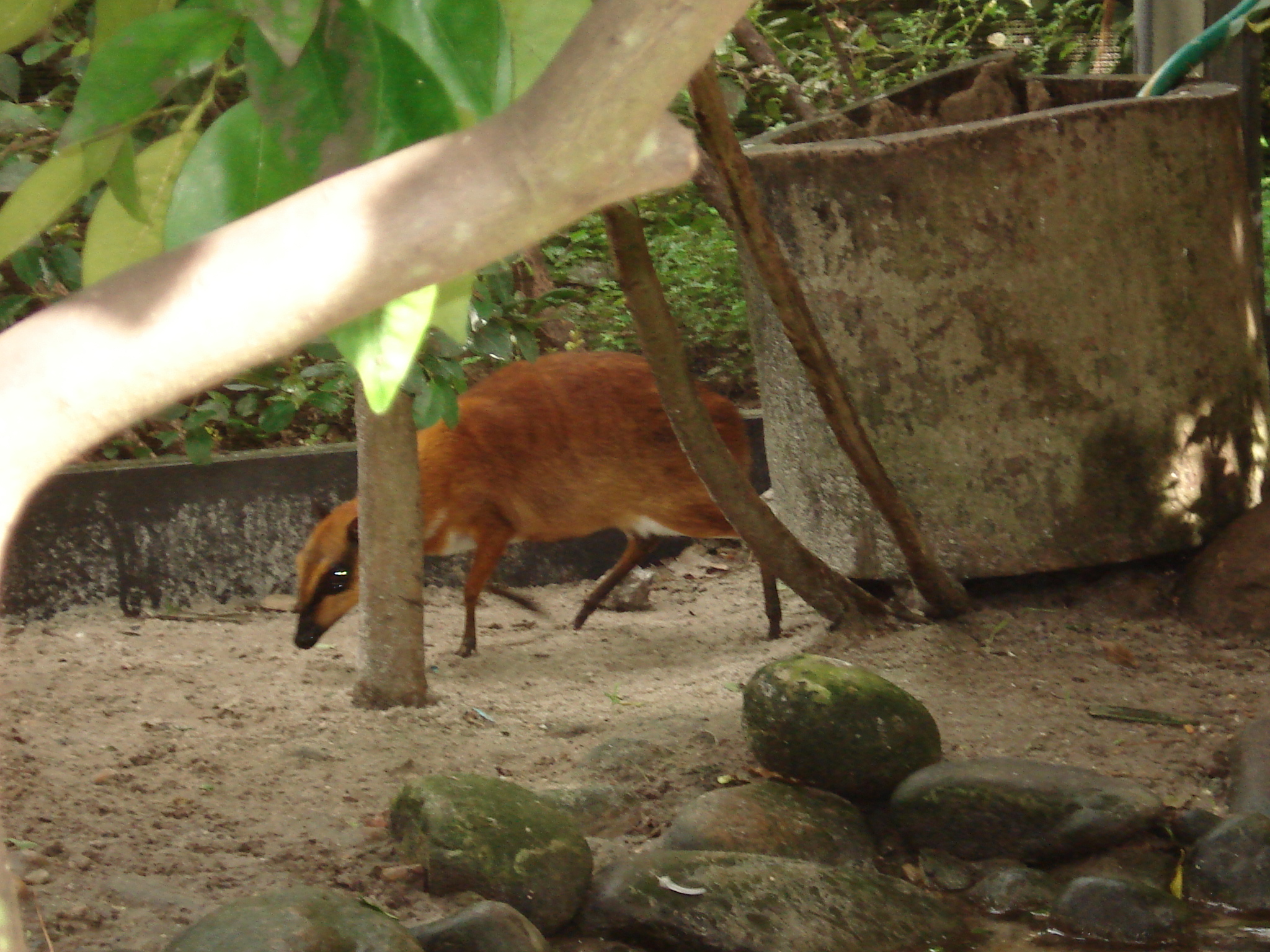

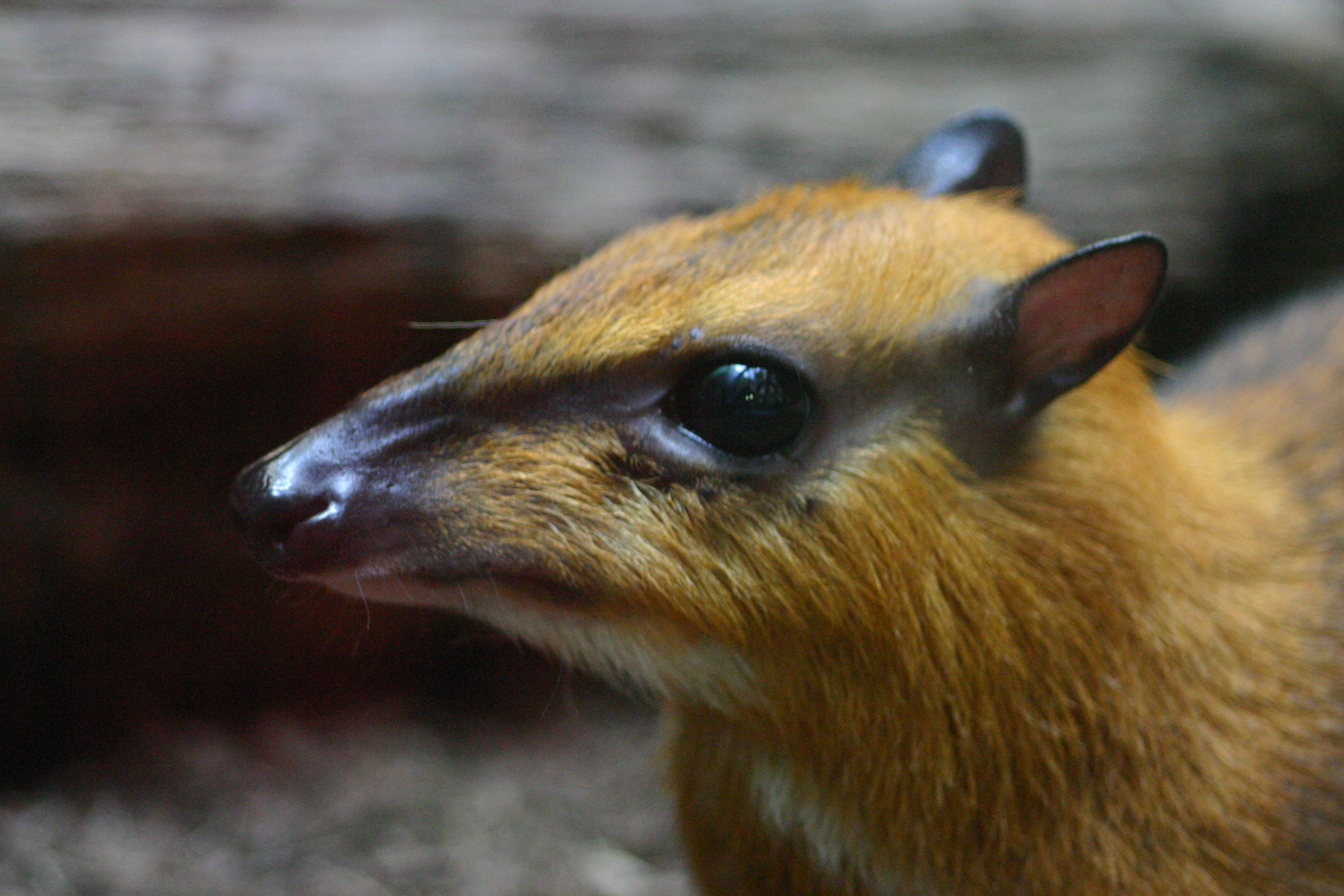

=== Family: Bovidae ===
==== Genus: Capricornis ====
Species: Sumatran serow (Capricornis sumatraensis) VU/

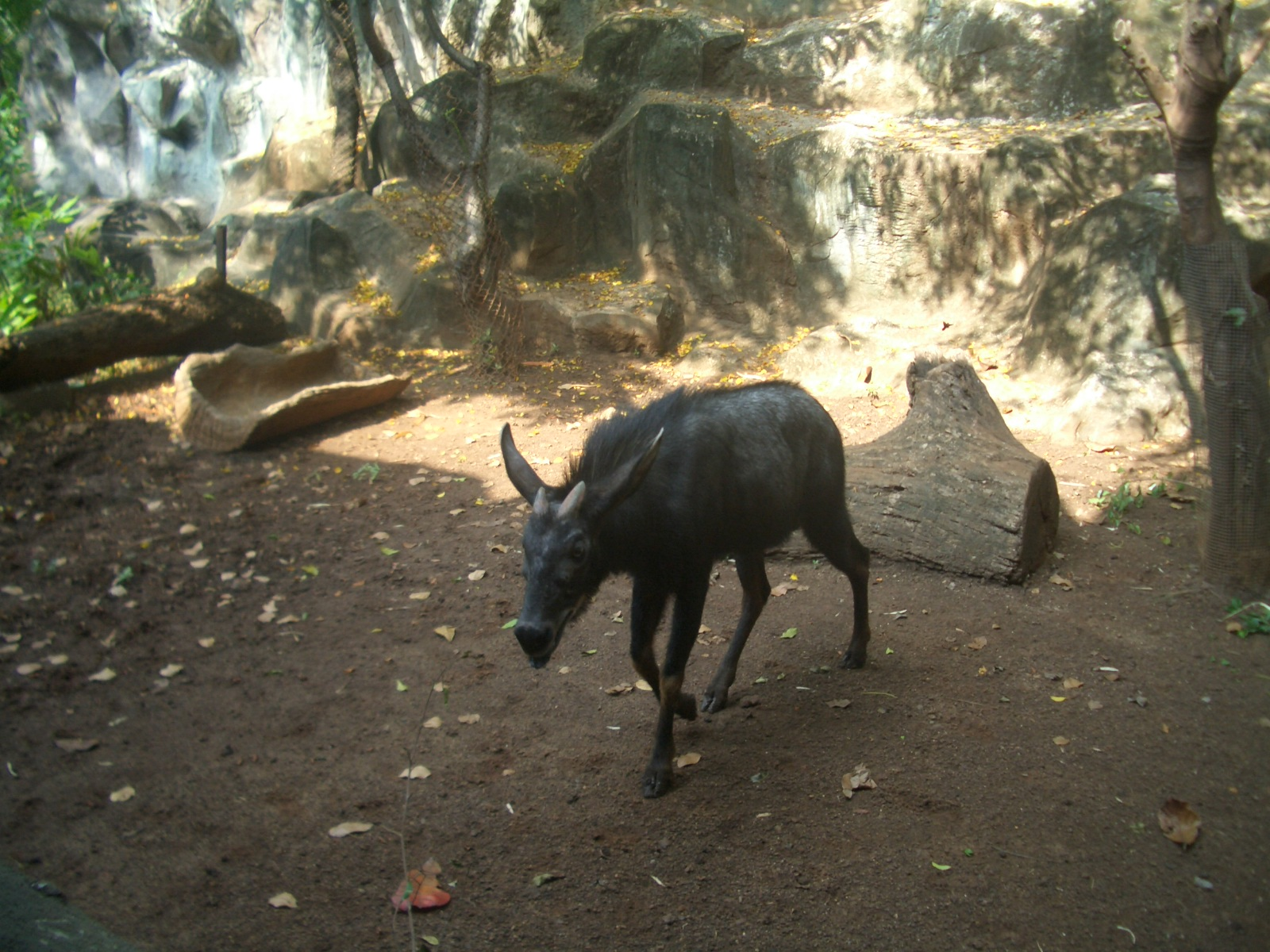

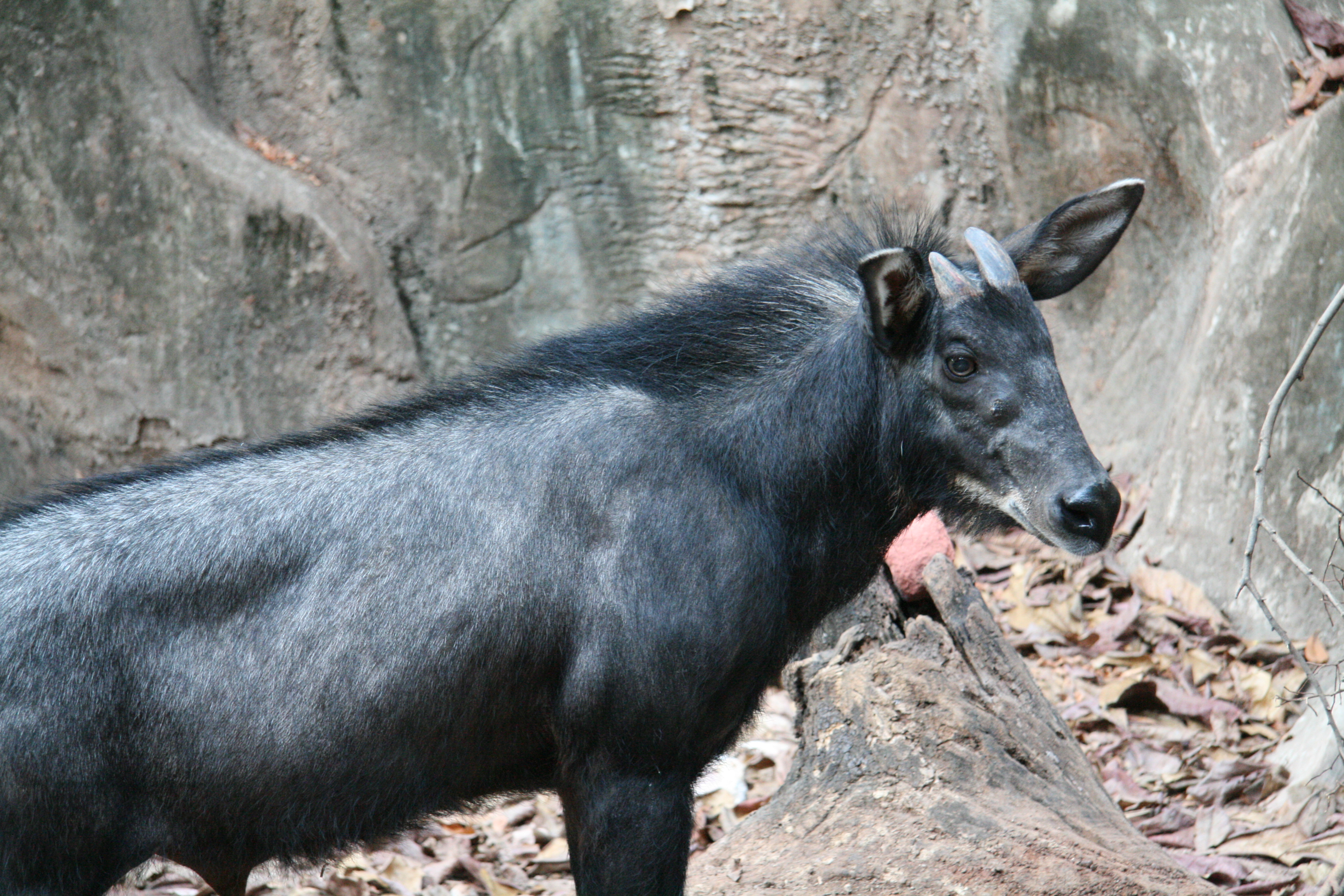

=== Family: Cervidae ===
==== Genus: Rusa ====
Species: Sambar deer (Rusa unicolor) VU/

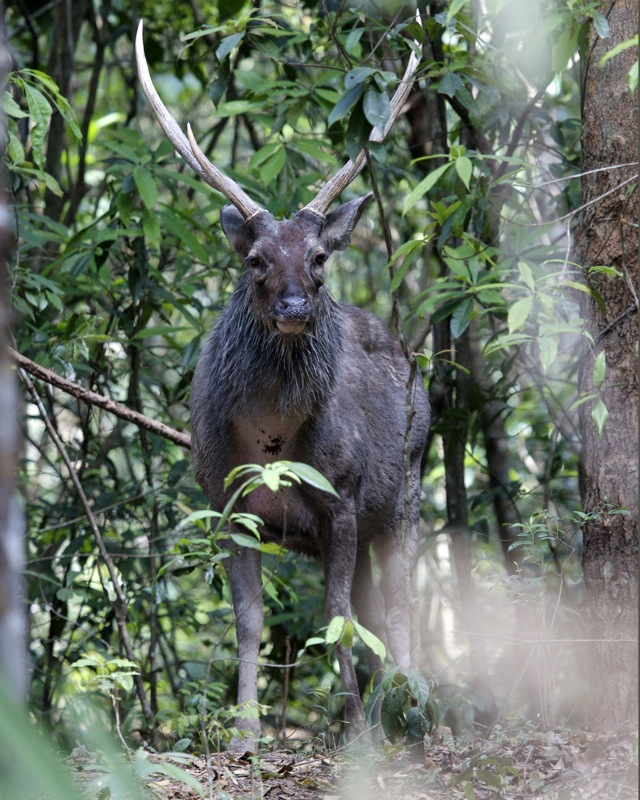

==== Genus: Muntiacus ====
Species:

- Sumatran muntjac (Muntiacus montanus) DD/
- Southern red muntjac (Muntiacus muntjak) LC/
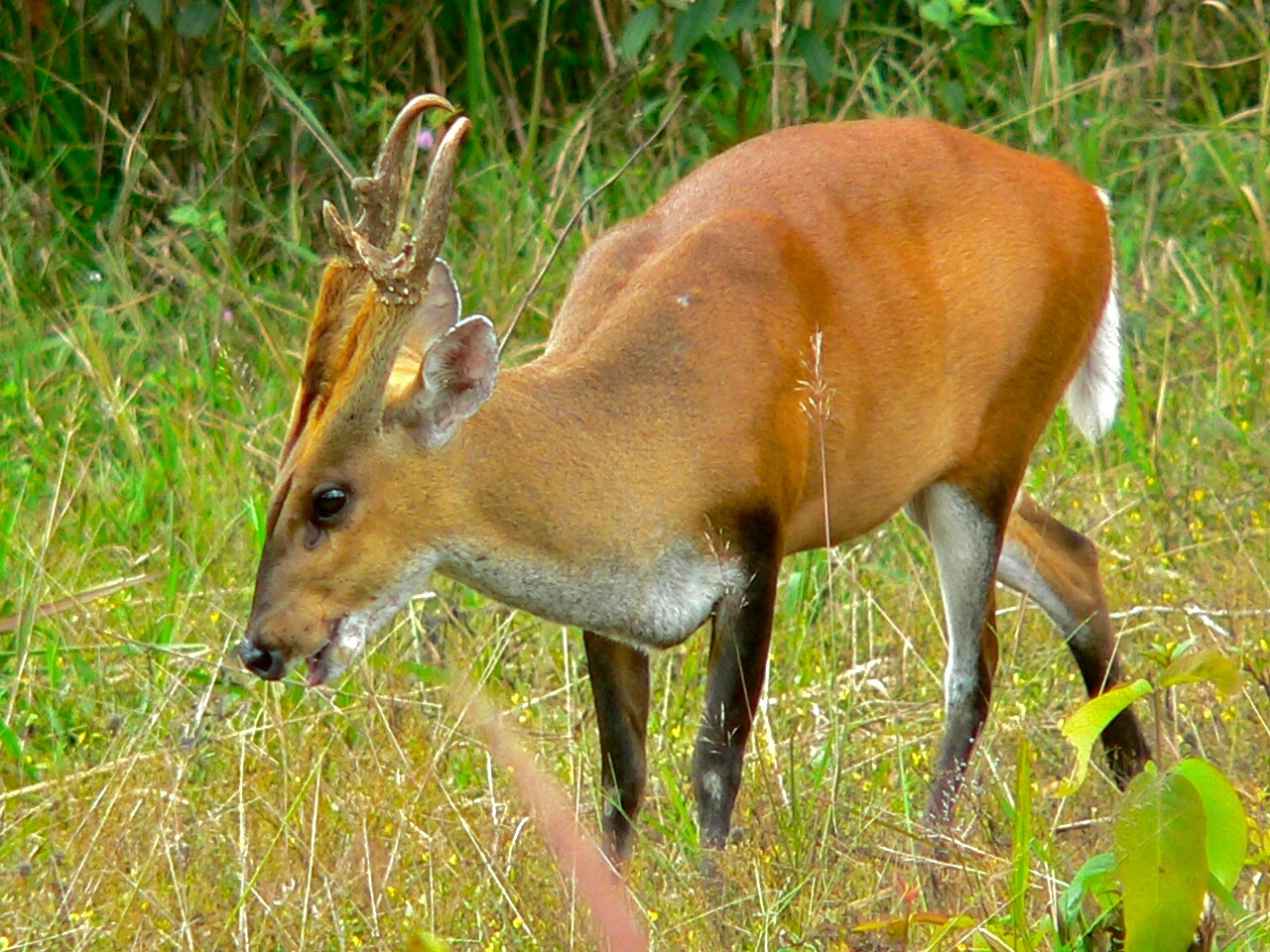

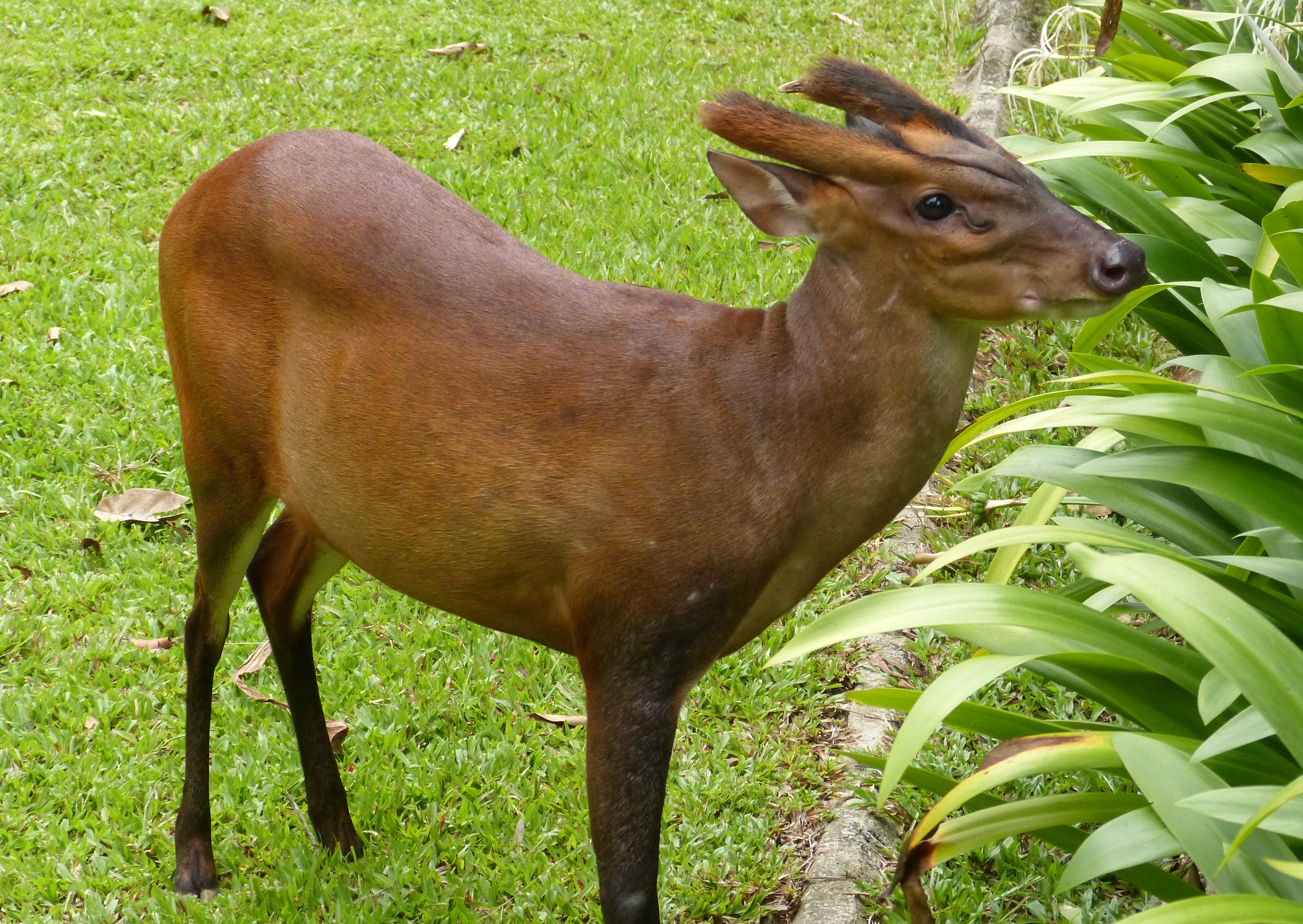

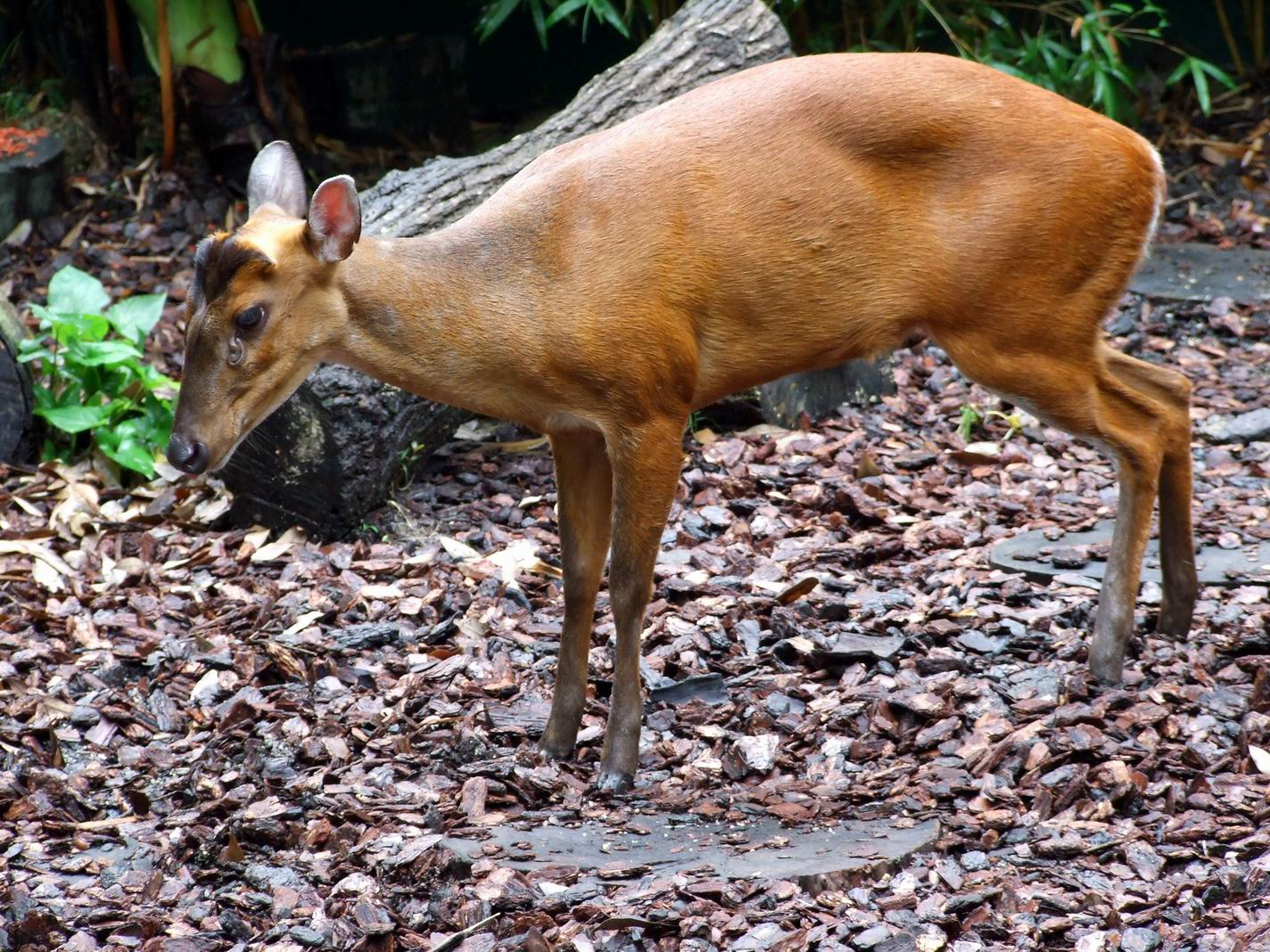

== Order: Lagomorpha ==
=== Family: Leporidae ===
==== Genus: Nesolagus ====
Species: Sumatran striped rabbit (Nesolagus netscheri) VU/

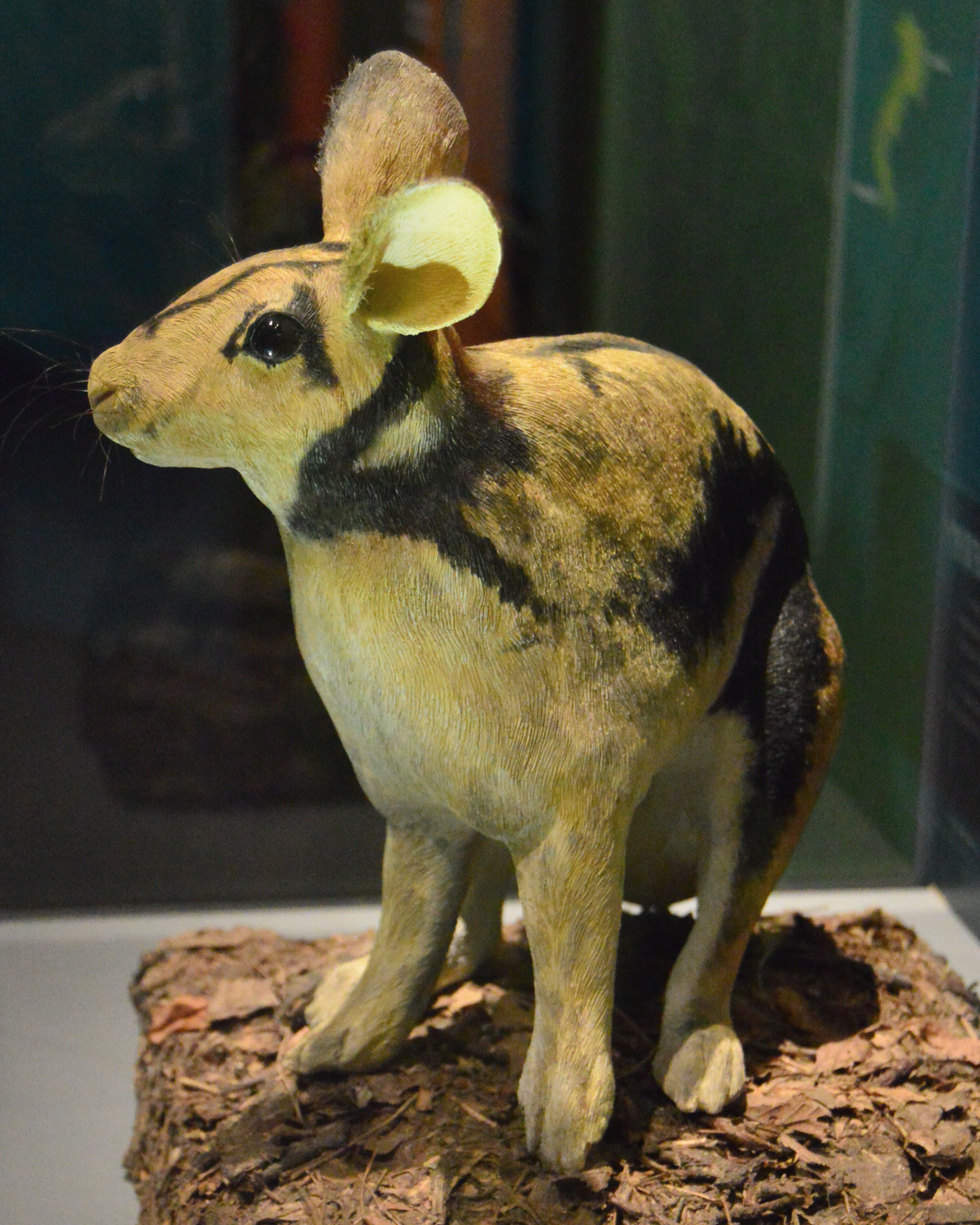

== Order: Rodentia ==
=== Family: Hystricidae ===
==== Genus: Hystrix ====
Species:

- Malayan porcupine (Hystrix brachyura) LC/
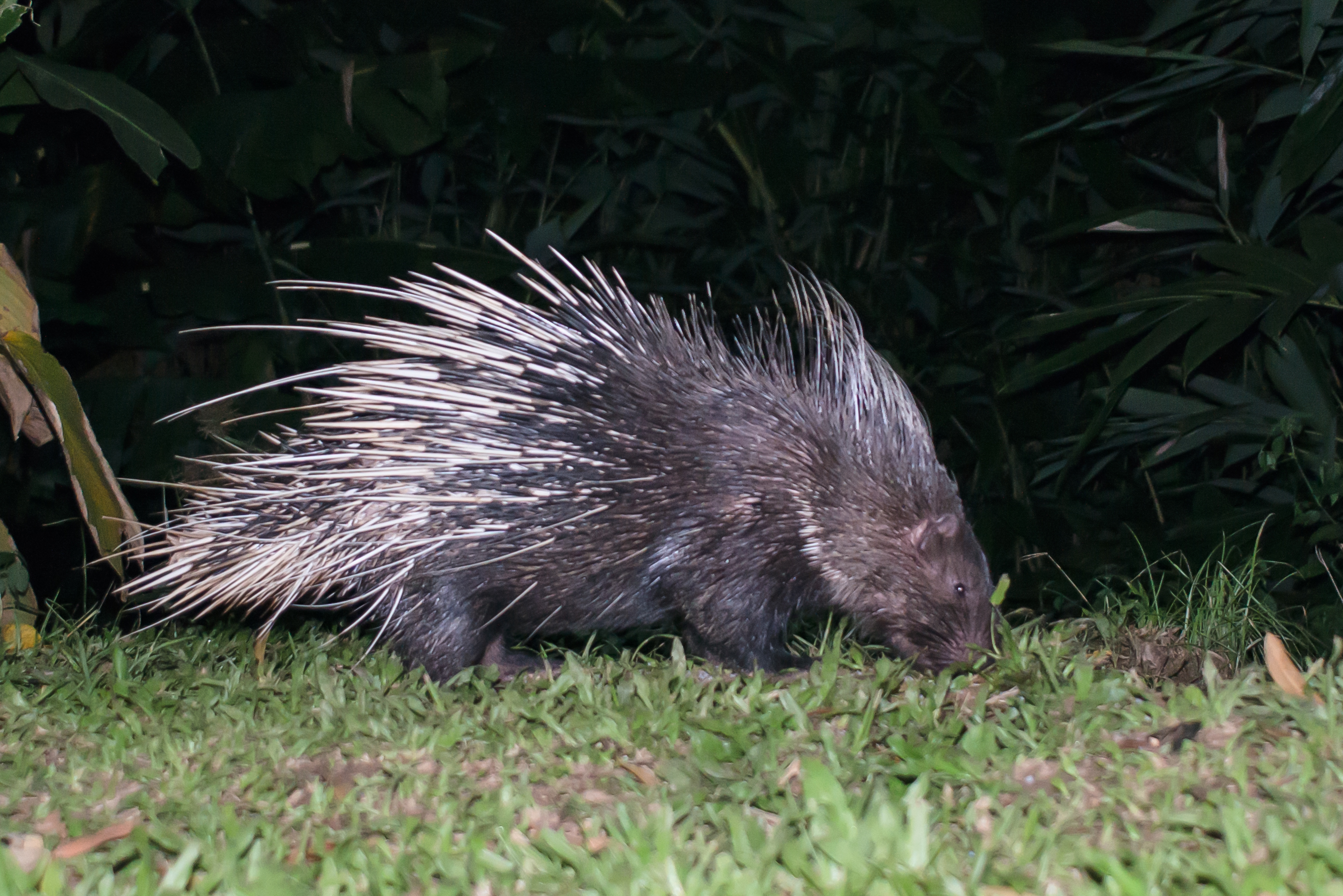

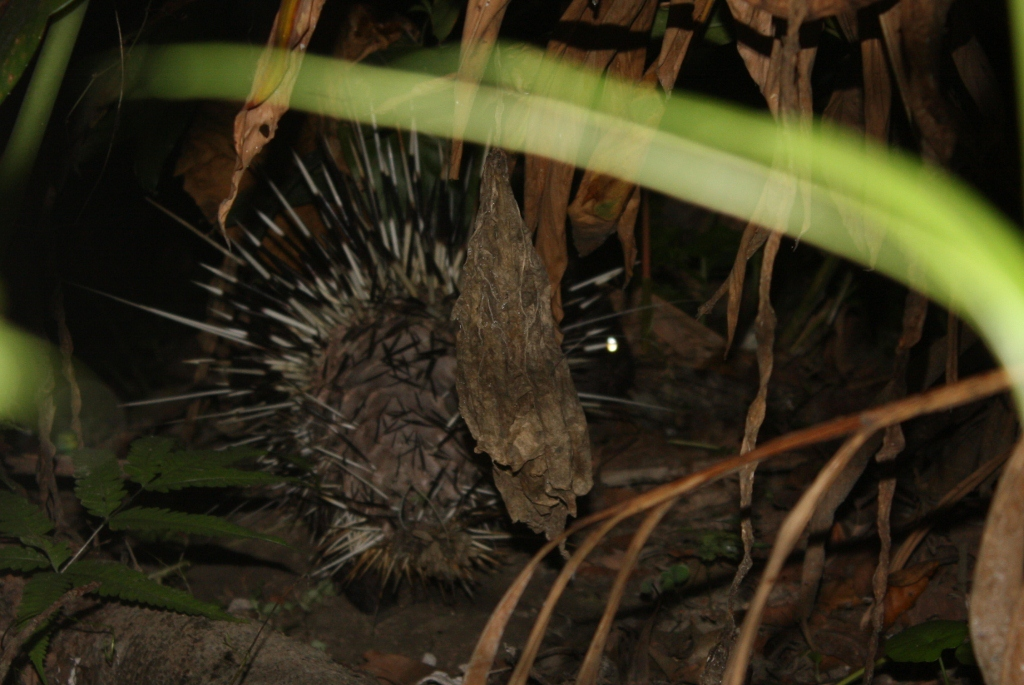

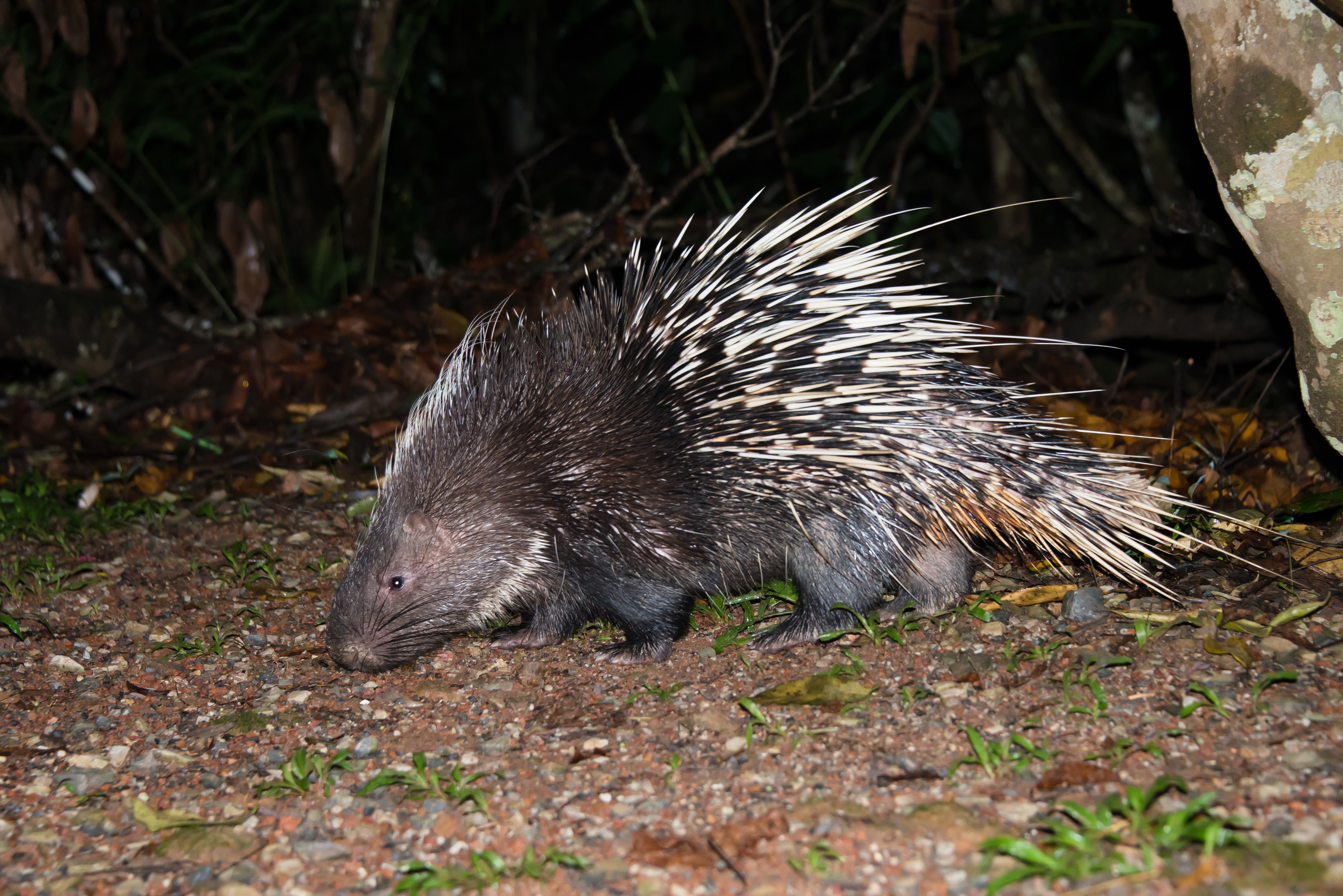
- Sumatran porcupine (Hystrix sumatrae) LC/

==== Genus: Trichys ====
Species: Long-tailed porcupine (Trichys fasciculata) LC/

=== Family: Sciuridae ===
==== Genus: Aeromys ====
Species: Black flying squirrel (Aeromys tephromelas) DD/

==== Genus: Callosciurus ====
Species:

- Kloss's squirrel (Callosciurus albescens) DD/
- Mentawai squirrel (Callosciurus melanogaster) VU/
- Black-striped squirrel (Callosciurus nigrovittatus) NT/
- Plantain squirrel (Callosciurus notatus) LC/
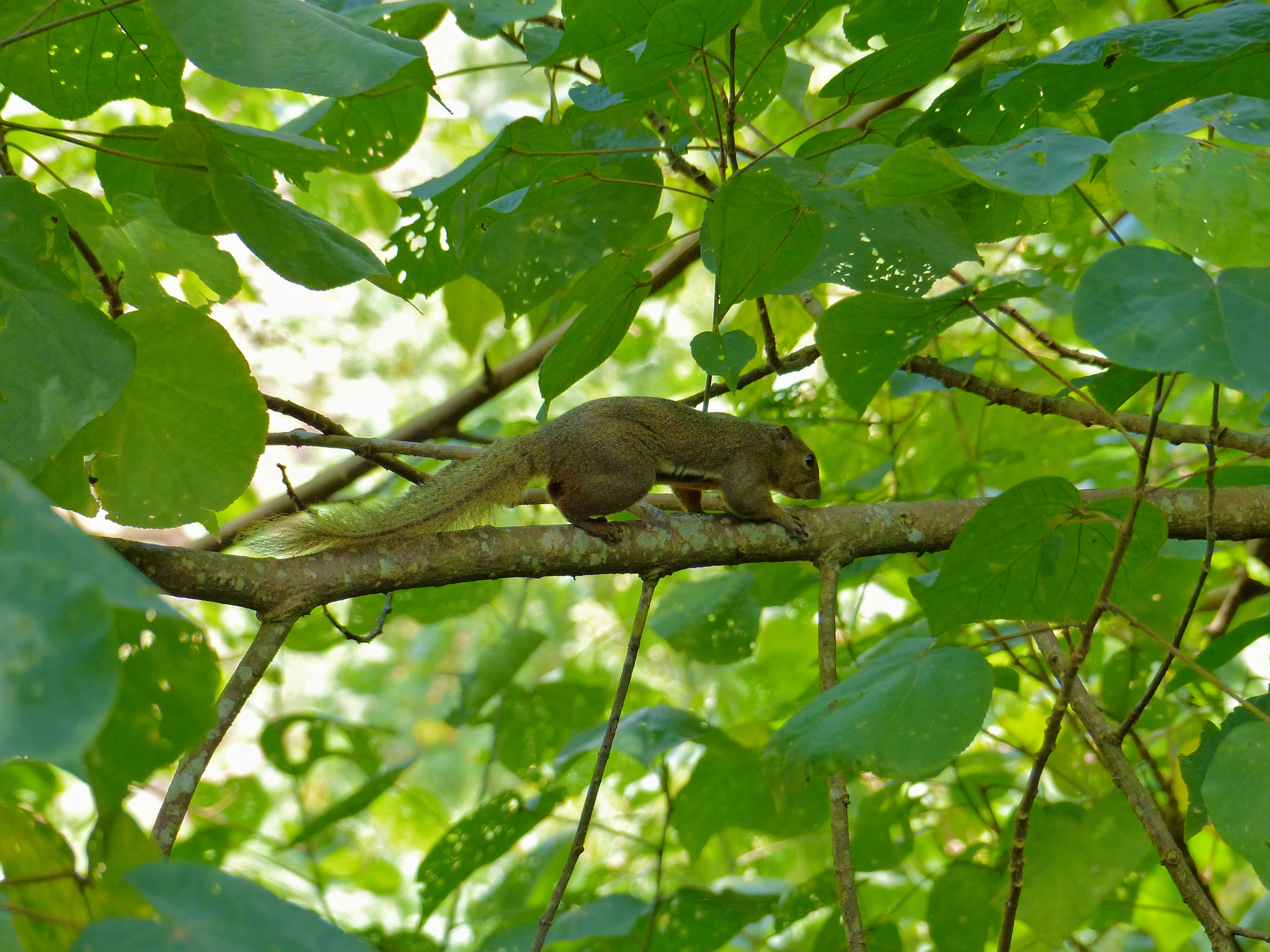

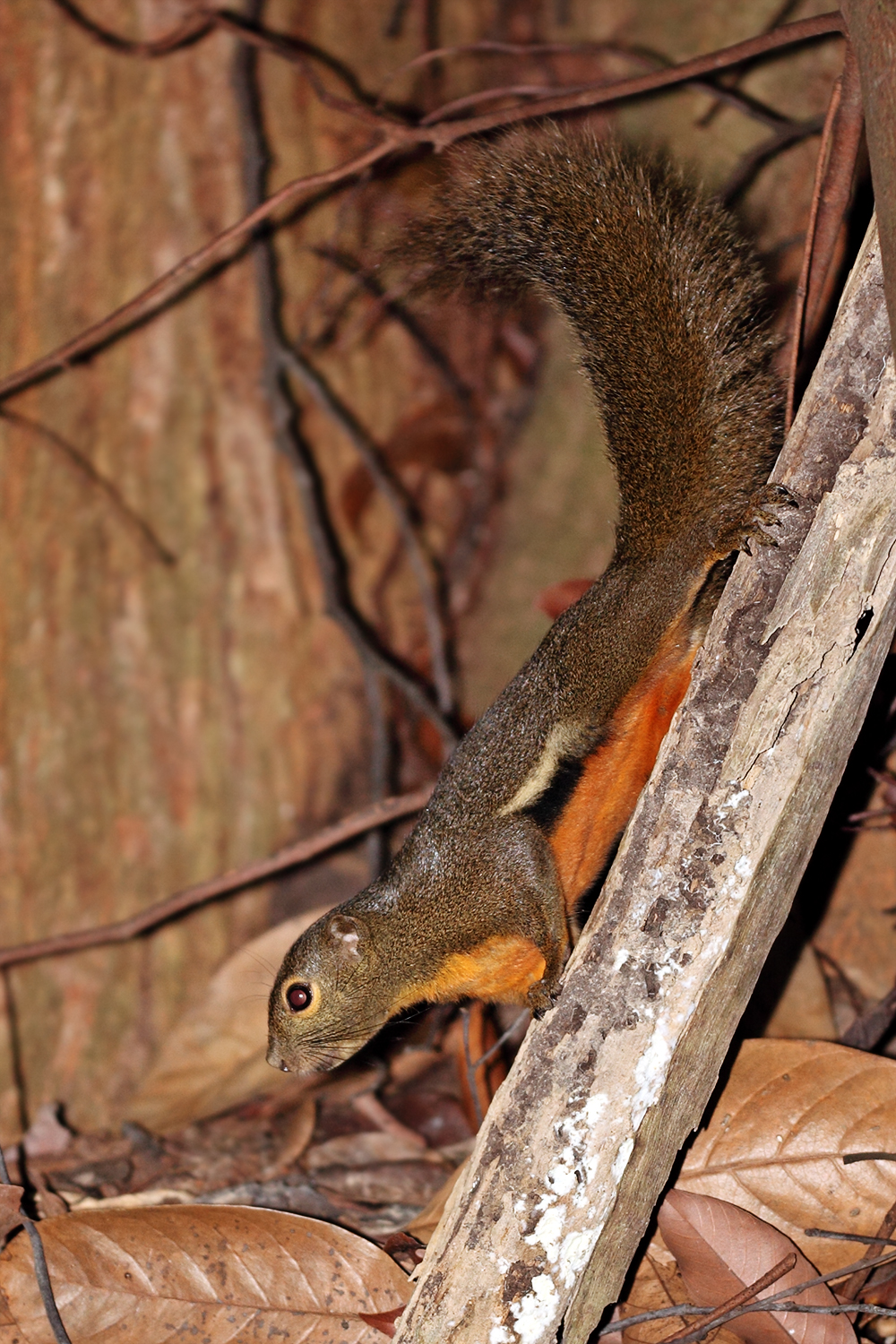

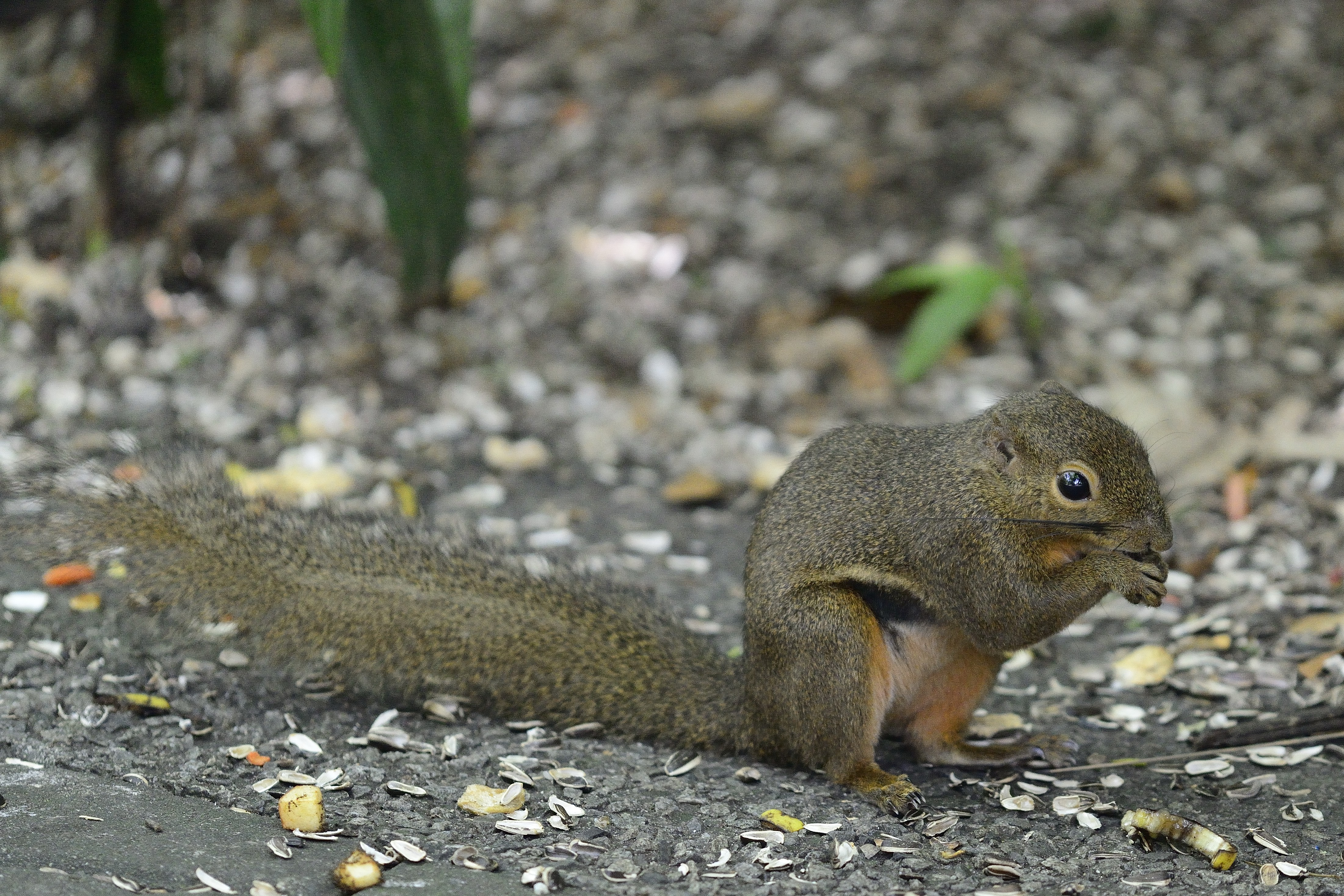
- Prevost's squirrel (Callosciurus prevostii) LC/
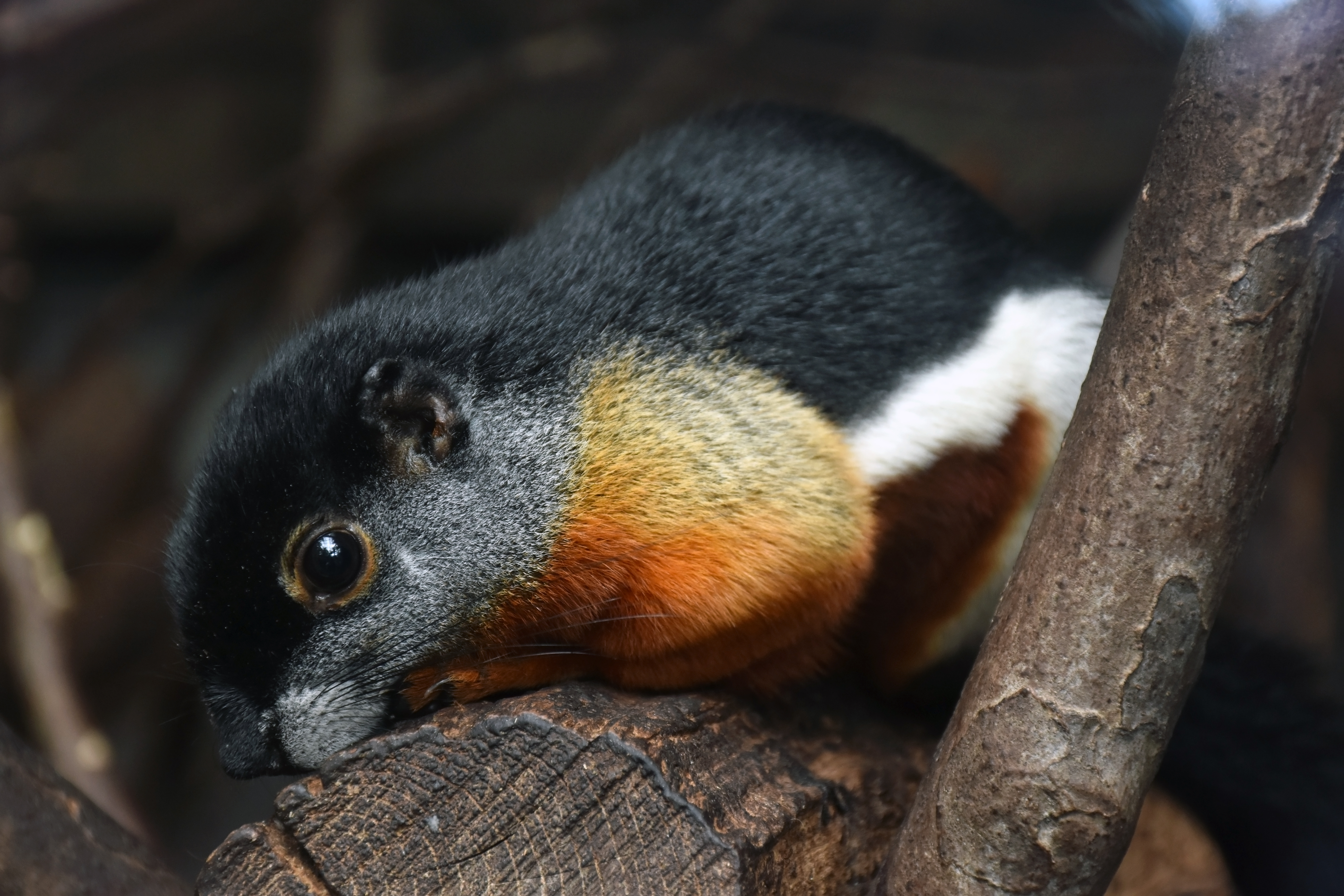

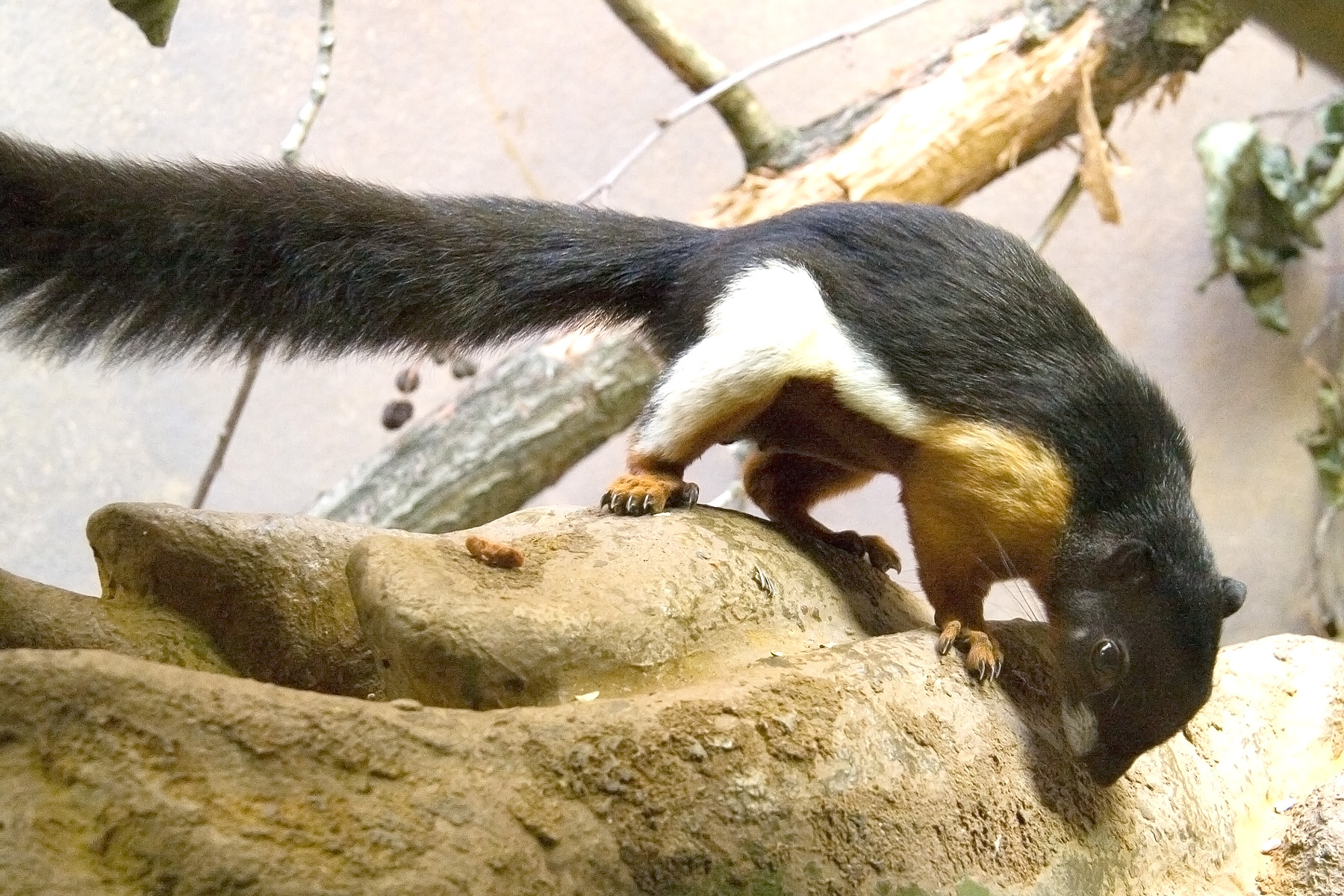

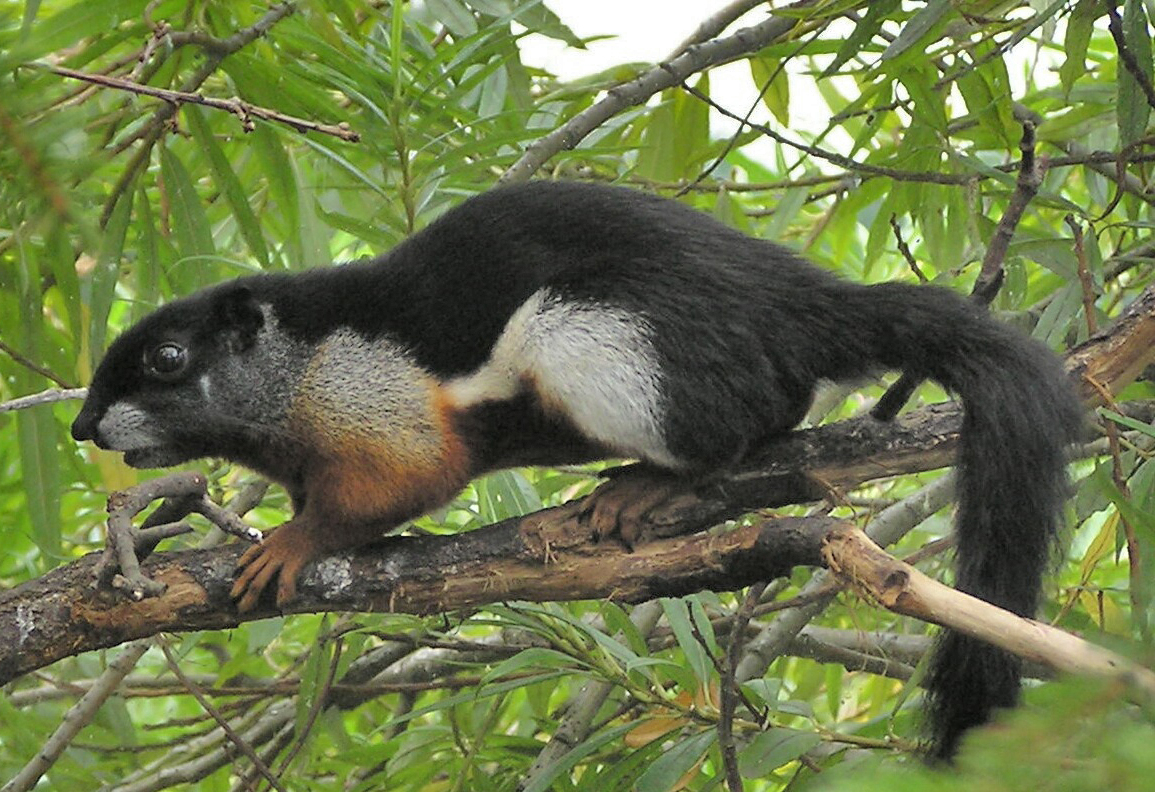

==== Genus: Exilisciurus ====
Species: Least pygmy squirrel (Exilisciurus exilis) DD/

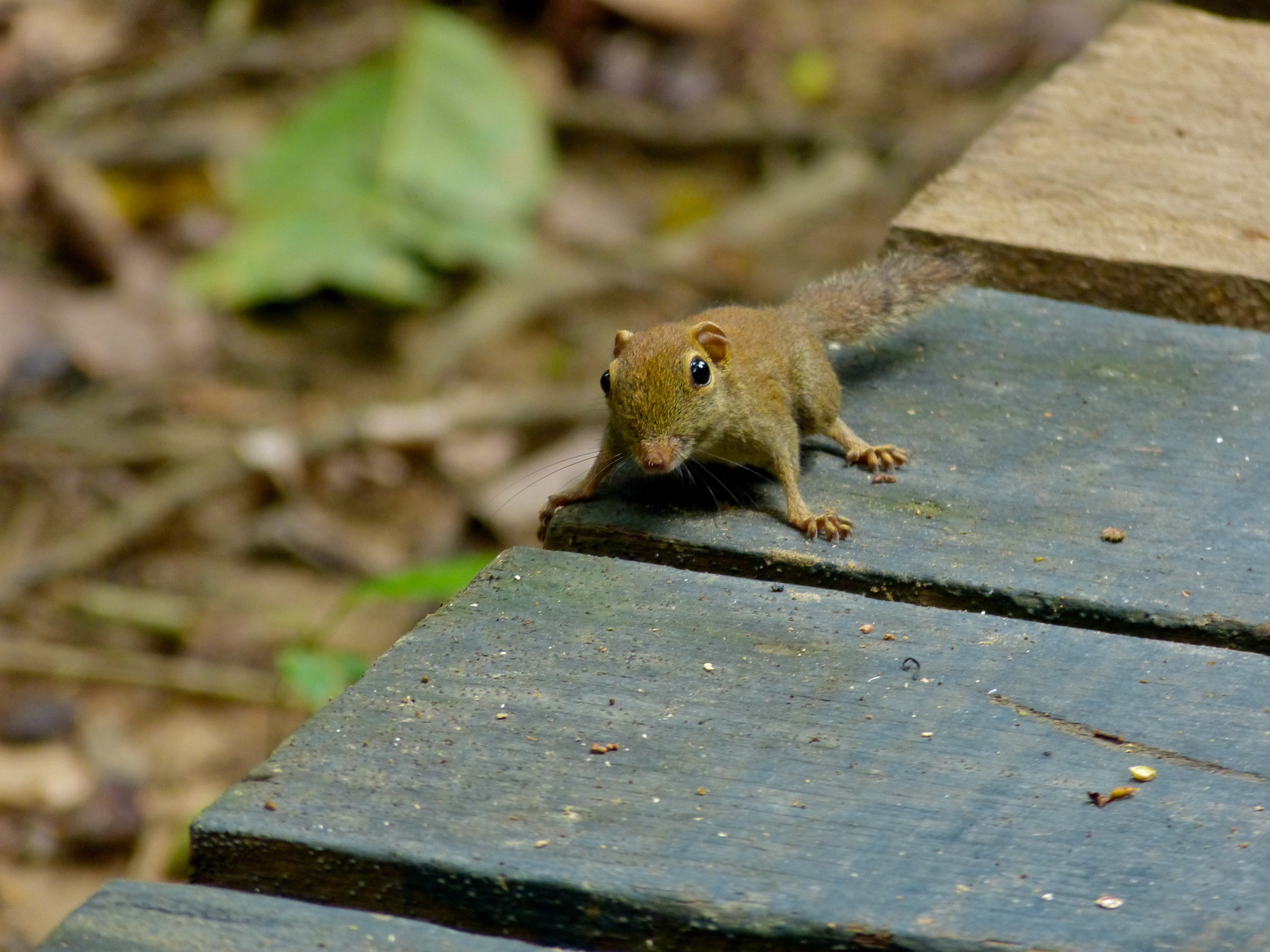

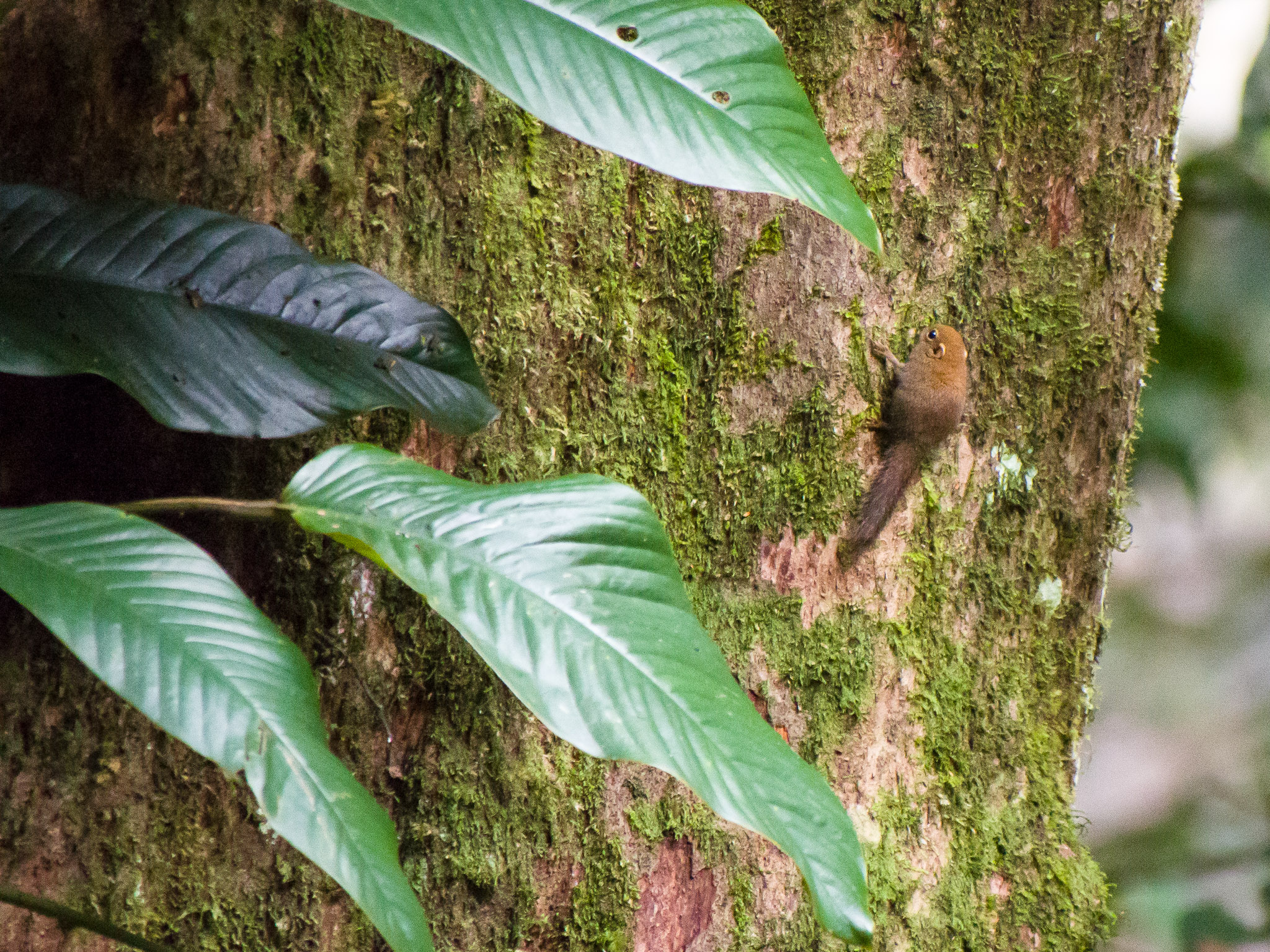

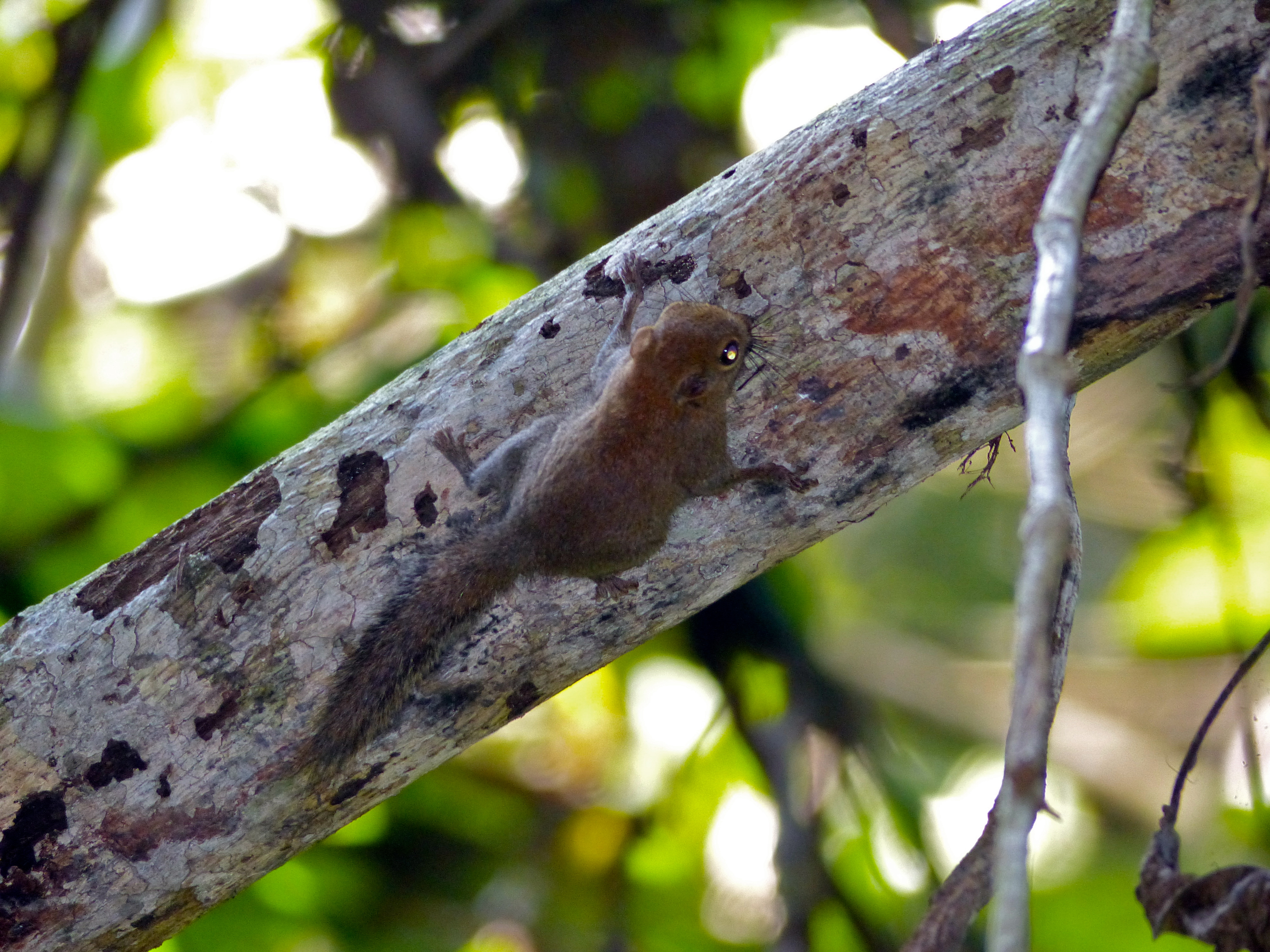

==== Genus: Hylopetes ====
Species:

- Gray-cheeked flying squirrel (Hylopetes lepidus) DD/
- Jentink's flying squirrel (Hylopetes platyurus) DD/
- Sipora flying squirrel (Hylopetes sipora) EN/
- Red-cheeked flying squirrel (Hylopetes spadiceus) LC/
- Sumatran flying squirrel (Hylopetes winstoni) DD/

==== Genus: Iomys ====
Species:

- Javanese flying squirrel (Iomys horsfieldii) LC/
- Mentawi flying squirrel (Iomys sipora) EN/

==== Genus: Lariscus ====
Species:

- Three-striped ground squirrel (Lariscus insignis) LC/
- Niobe ground squirrel (Lariscus niobe) DD/
- Mentawai three-striped squirrel (Lariscus obscurus) NT/

==== Genus: Petaurista ====
Species: Spotted giant flying squirrel (Petaurista elegans) LC/

==== Genus: Petinomys ====
Species:

- Whiskered flying squirrel (Petinomys genibarbis) VU/
- Hagen's flying squirrel (Petinomys hageni) DD/
- Siberut flying squirrel (Petinomys lugens) EN/
- Temminck's flying squirrel (Petinomys setosus) VU/
- Vordermann's flying squirrel (Petinomys vordermanni) VU/

==== Genus: Pteromyscus ====
Species: Smoky flying squirrel (Pteromyscus pulverulentus) EN/

==== Genus: Ratufa ====
Species:

- Cream-coloured giant squirrel (Ratufa affinis) NT/
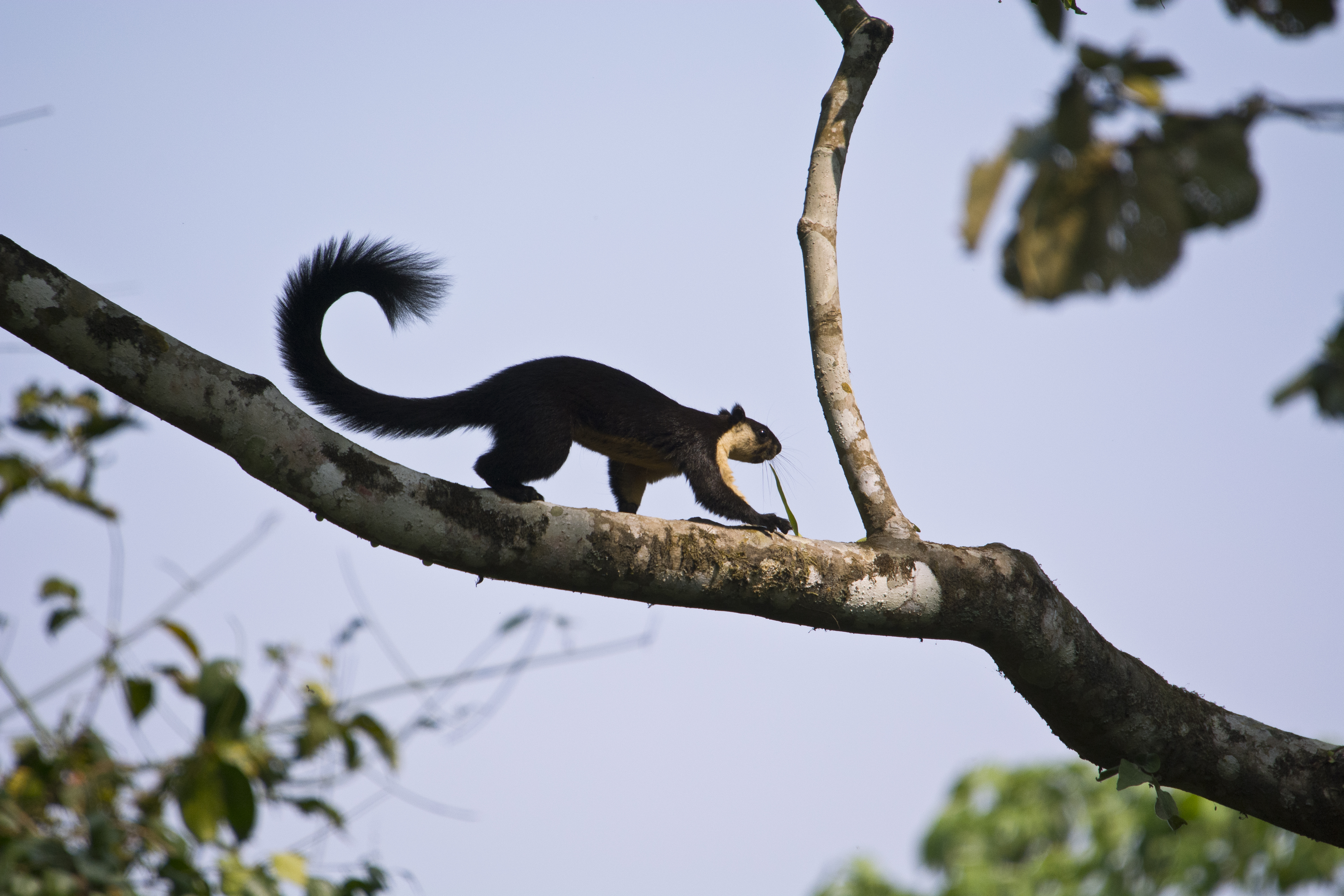

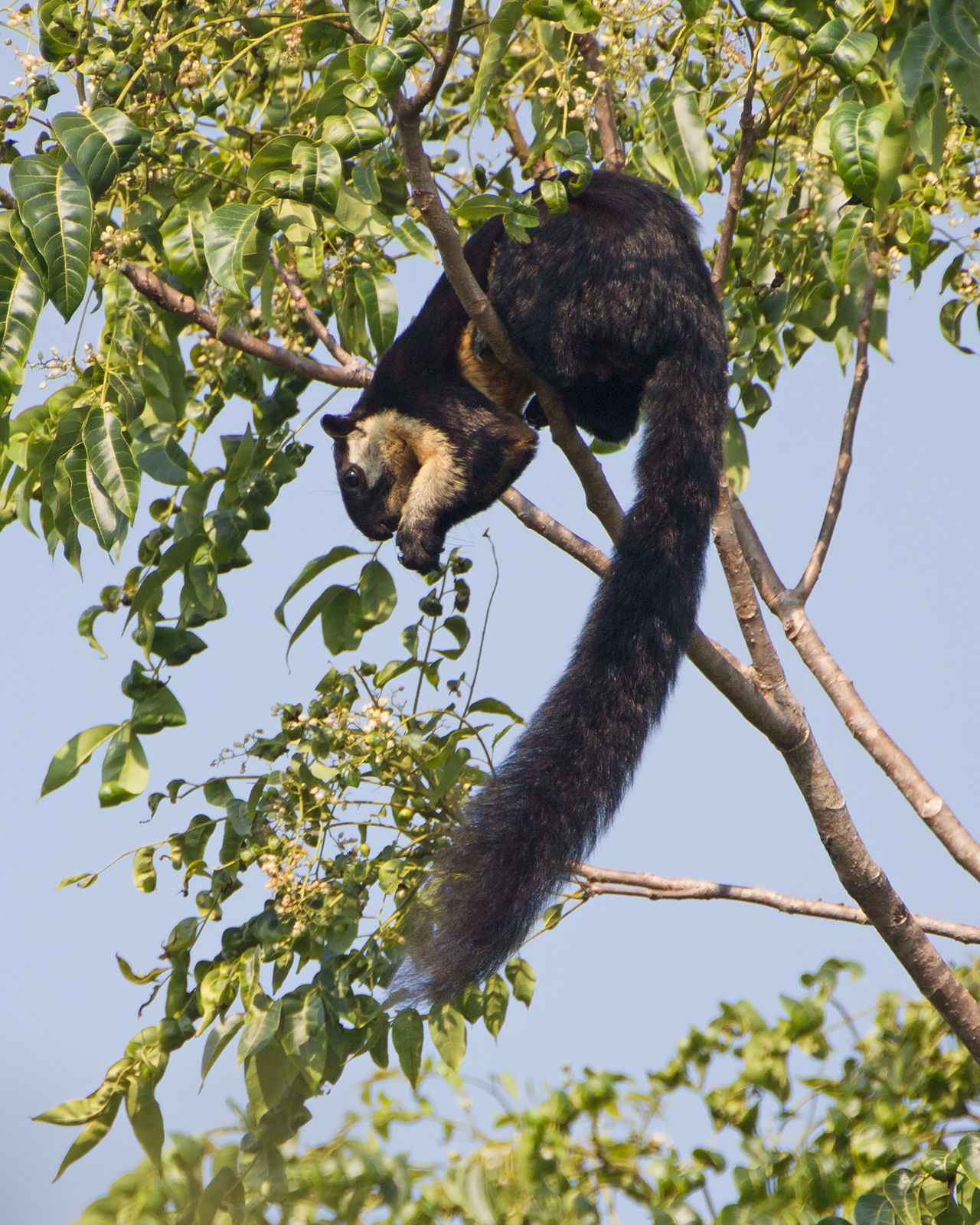

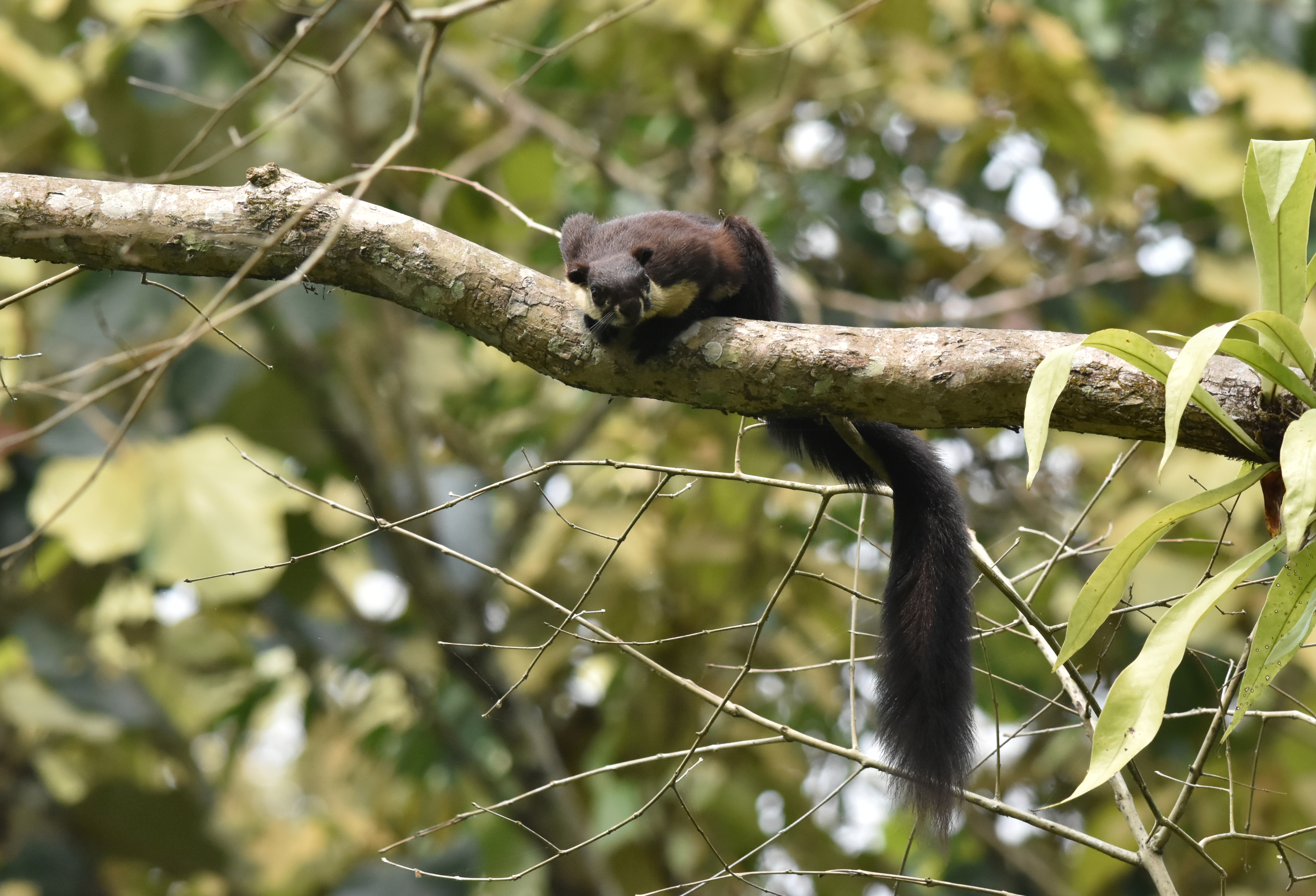
- Black giant squirrel (Ratufa bicolor) NT/
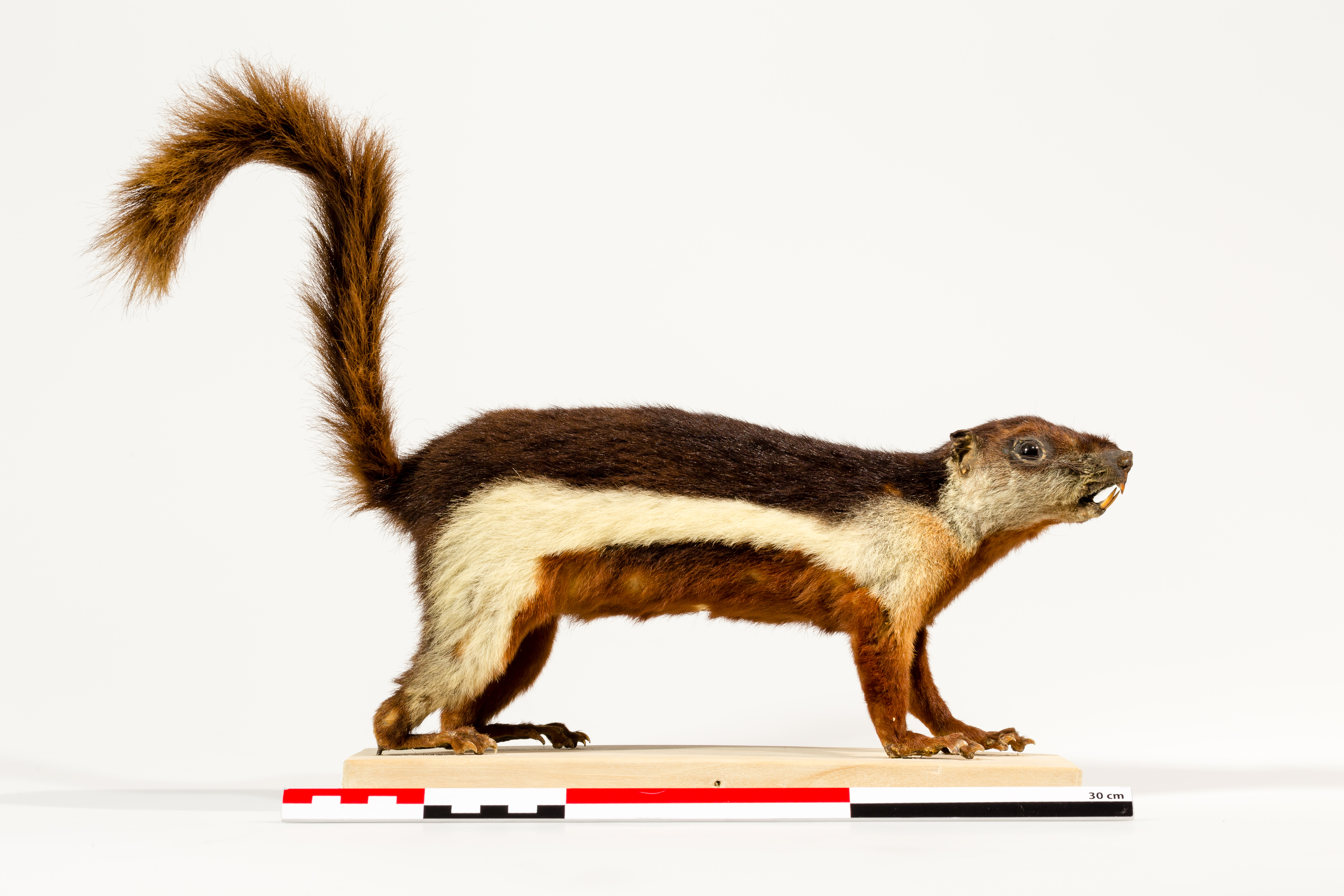

==== Genus: Rhinosciurus ====
Species: Shrew-faced squirrel (Rhinosciurus laticaudatus) NT/

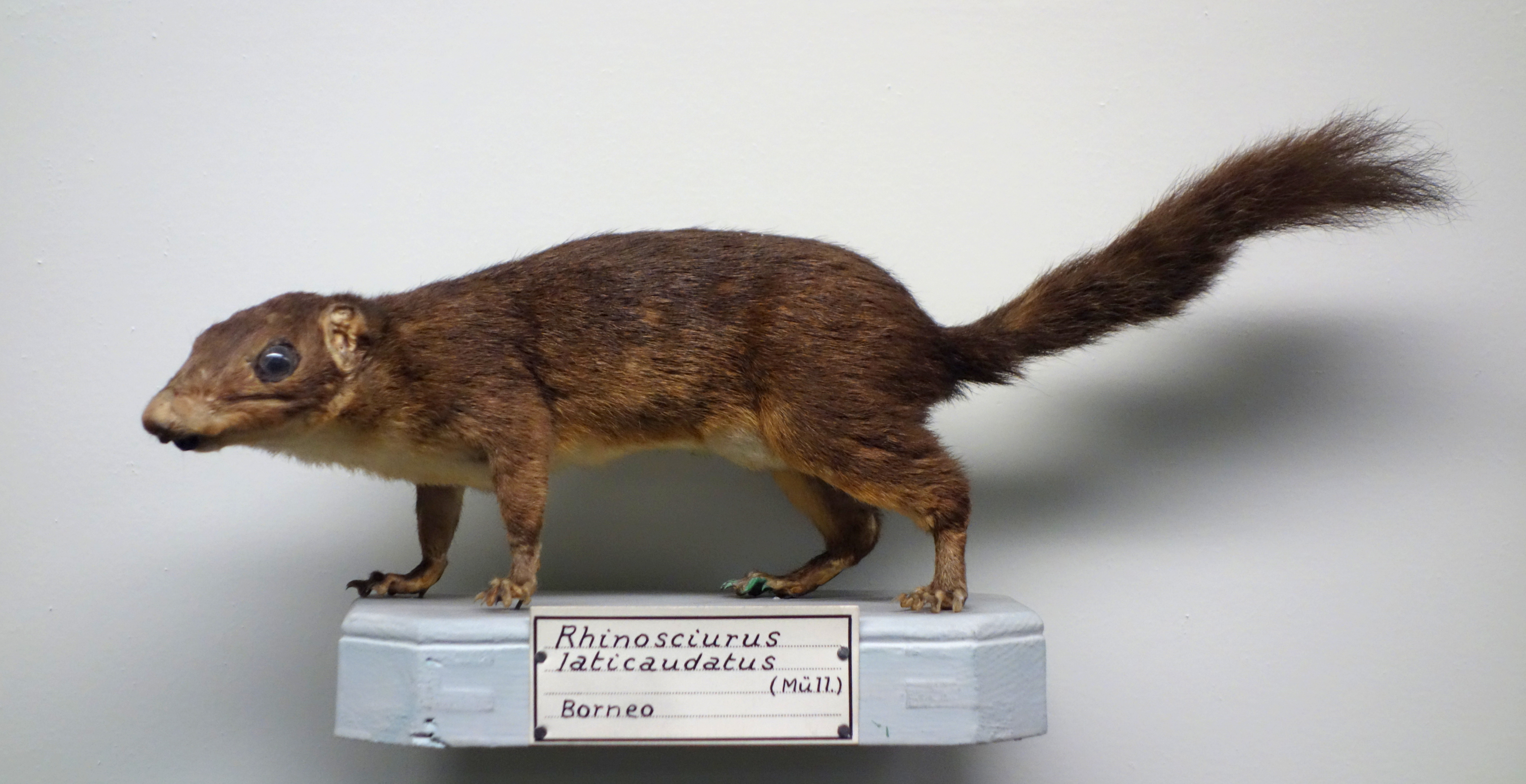

==== Genus: Sundasciurus ====
Species:

- Fraternal squirrel (Sundasciurus fraterculus) EN/
- Horse-tailed squirrel (Sundasciurus hippurus) NT/
- Low's squirrel (Sundasciurus lowii) LC/
- Slender squirrel (Sundasciurus tenuis) LC/
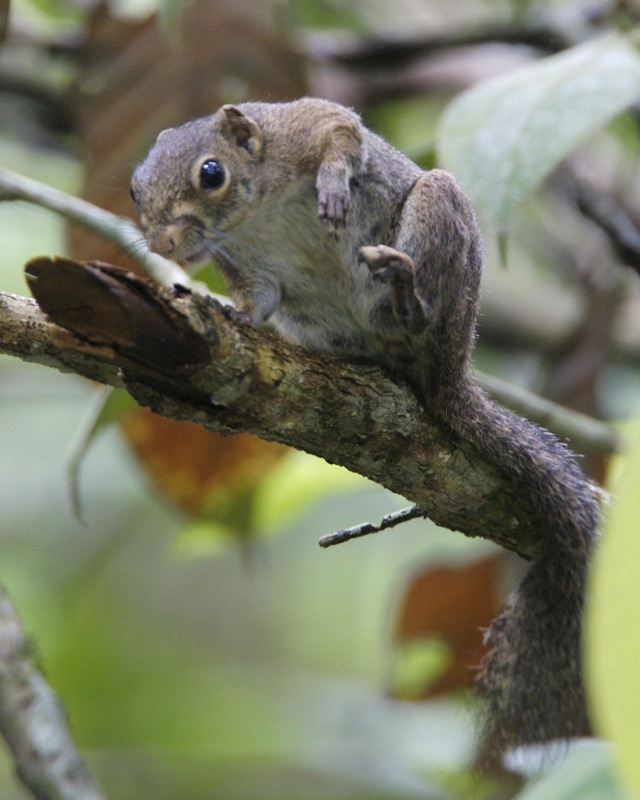

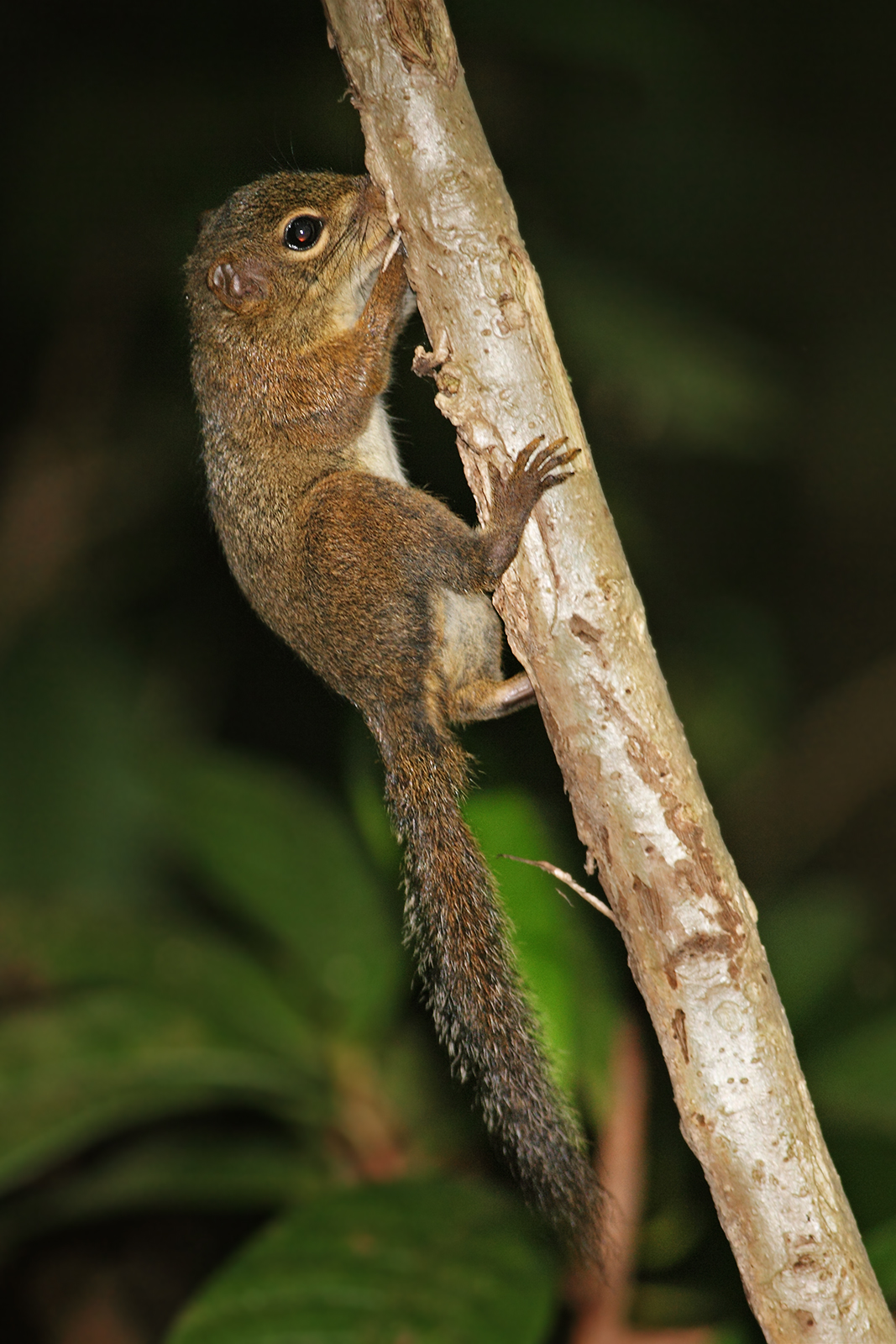

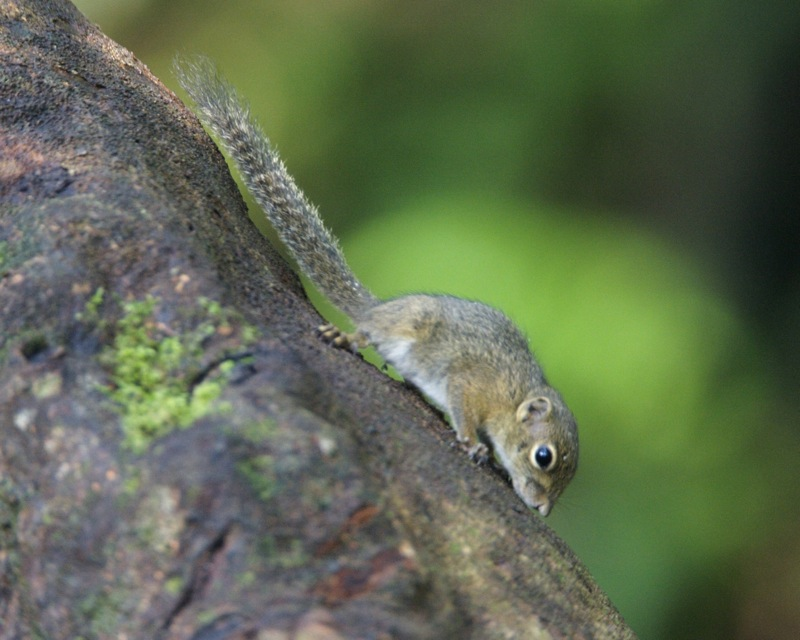

=== Family: Spalacidae ===
==== Genus: Rhizomys ====
Species: Large bamboo rat (Rhizomys sumatrensis) LC/

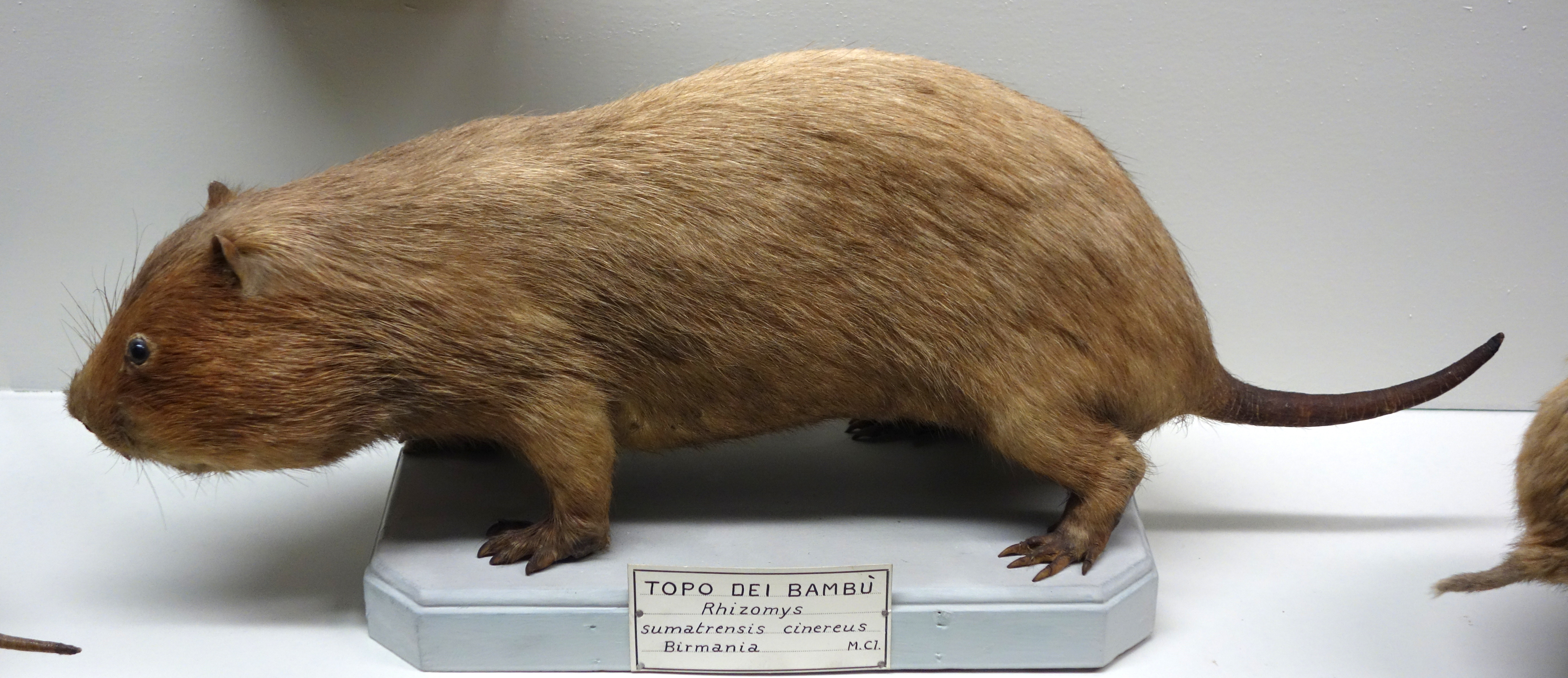

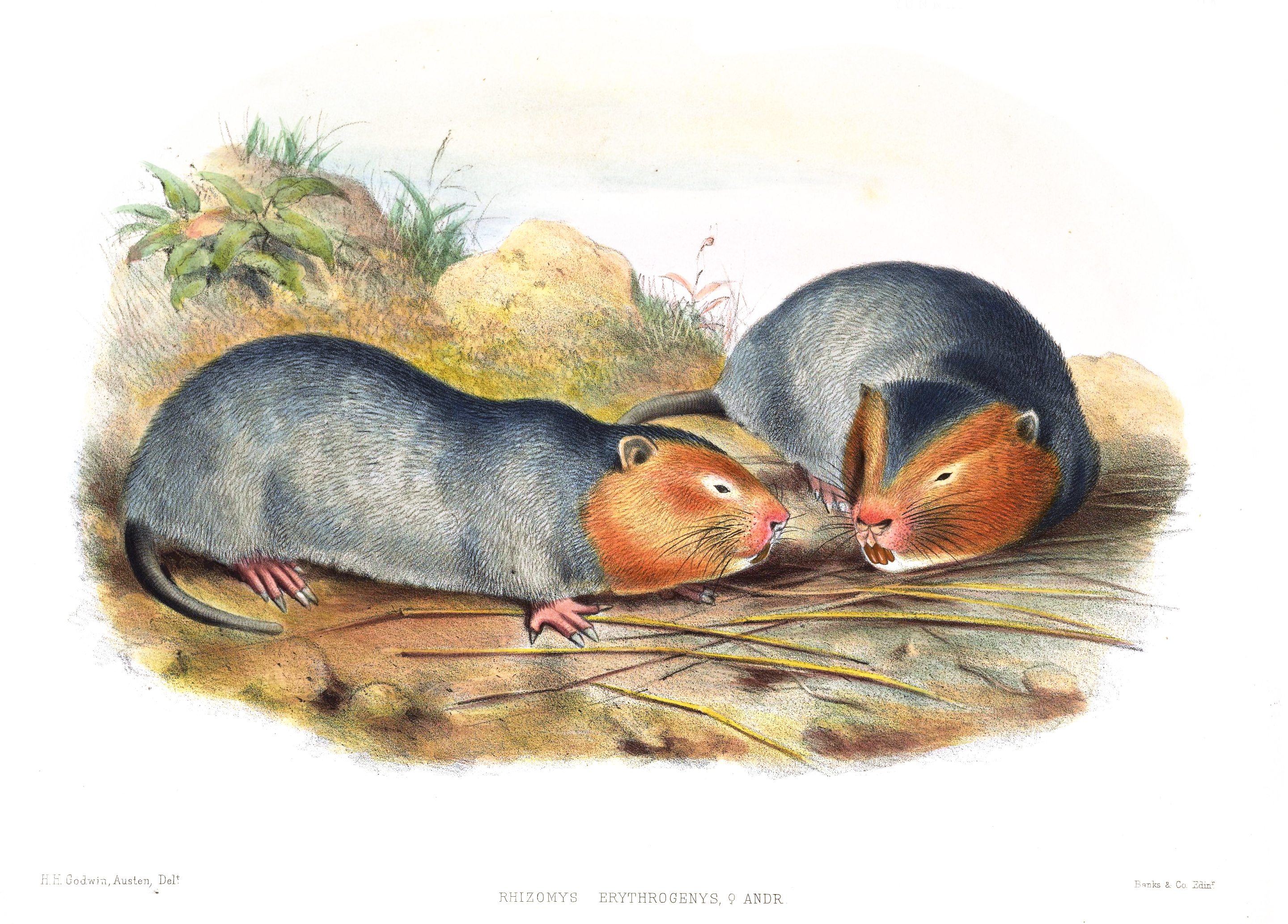

=== Family: Muridae ===
==== Genus: Berylmys ====
Species: Bower's white-toothed rat (Berylmys bowersi) LC/

==== Genus: Chiropodomys ====
Species:

- Indomalayan pencil-tailed tree mouse (Chiropodomys gliroides) LC/
- Koopman's pencil-tailed tree mouse (Chiropodomys karlkoopmani) EN/

==== Genus: Leopoldamys ====
Species:

- Sundaic mountain leopoldamys (Leopoldamys ciliatus) LC/
- Long-tailed giant rat (Leopoldamys sabanus) LC/
- Mentawai long-tailed giant rat (Leopoldamys siporanus) EN/

==== Genus: Maxomys ====
Species:

- Sumatran spiny rat (Maxomys hylomyoides) NT/
- Fat-nosed spiny rat (Maxomys inflatus) VU/
- Pagai spiny rat (Maxomys pagensis) EN/
- Rajah spiny rat (Maxomys rajah) VU/
- Red spiny rat (Maxomys surifer) LC/
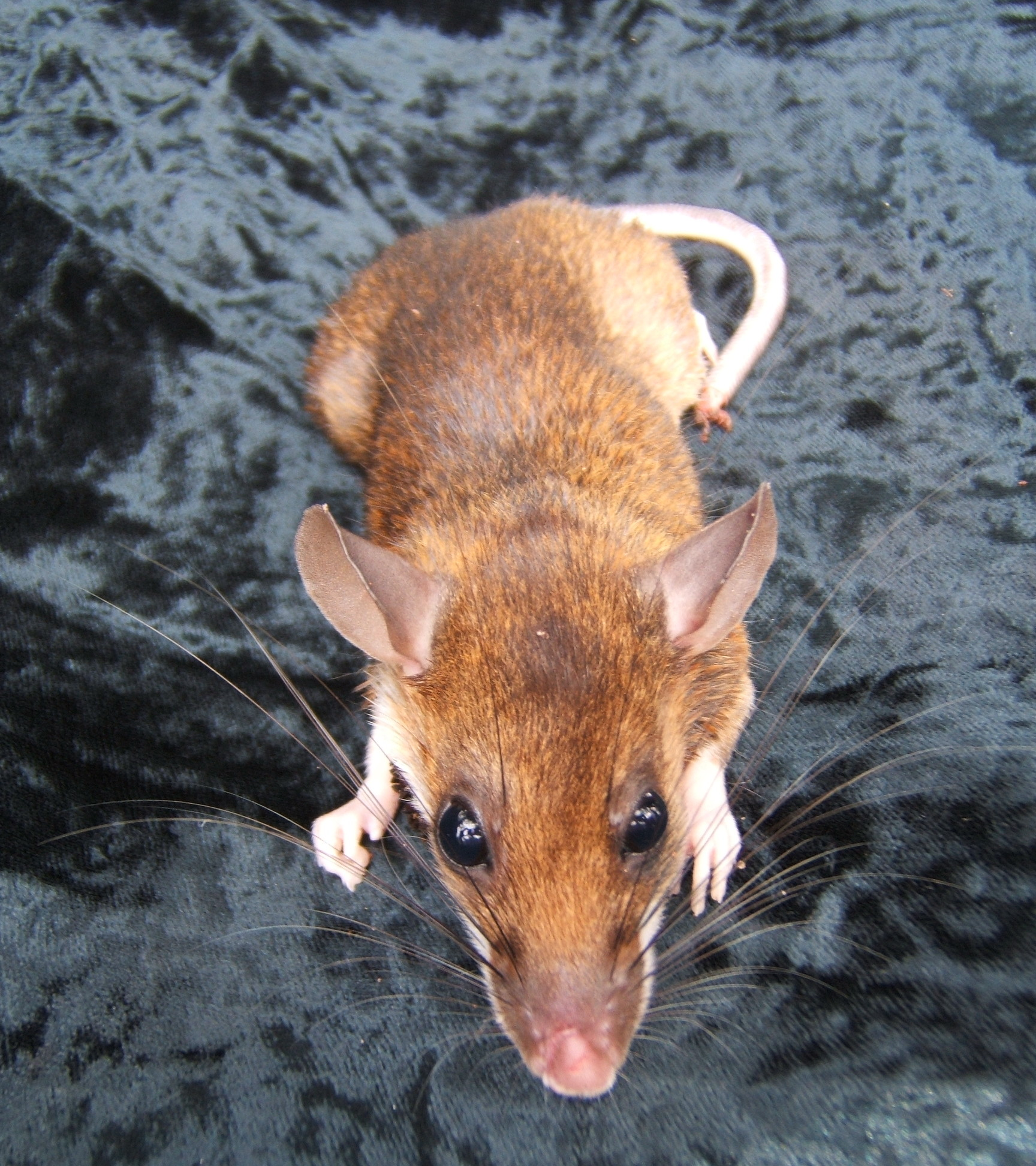
- Whitehead's spiny rat (Maxomys whiteheadi) VU/

==== Genus: Mus ====
Species: Sumatran shrewlike mouse (Mus crociduroides) LC/

==== Genus: Niviventer ====
Species:

- Dark-tailed tree rat (Niviventer cremoriventer) VU/
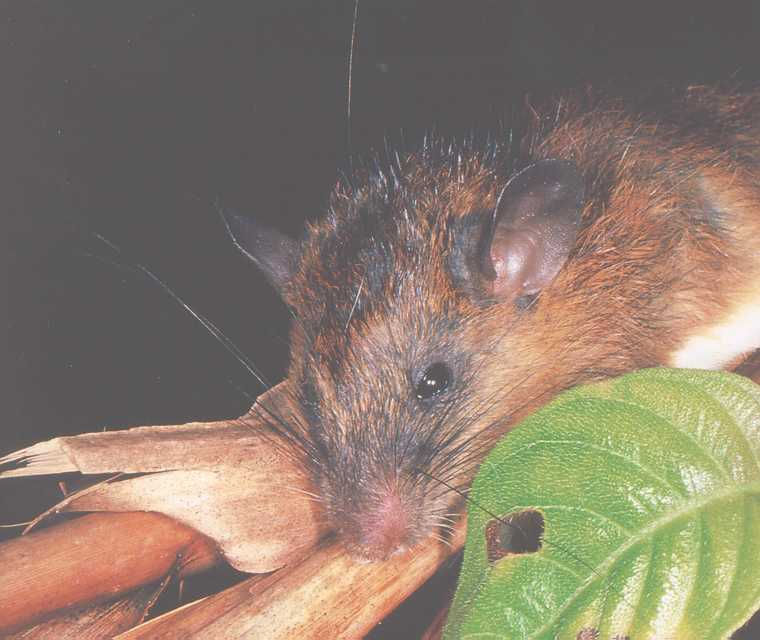
- Montane Sumatran white-bellied rat (Niviventer fraternus) LC/
- Chestnut white-bellied rat (Niviventer fulvescens) LC/
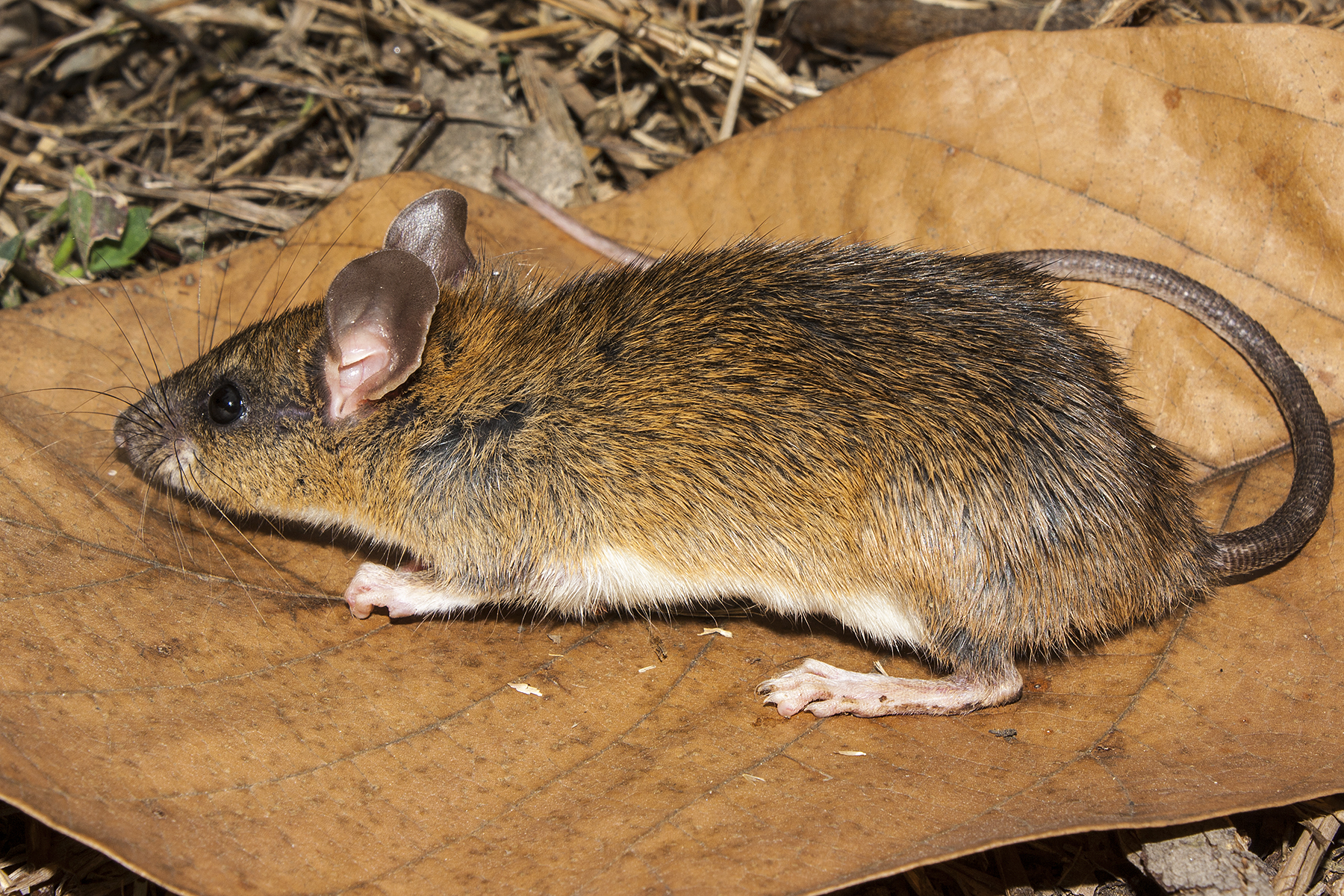

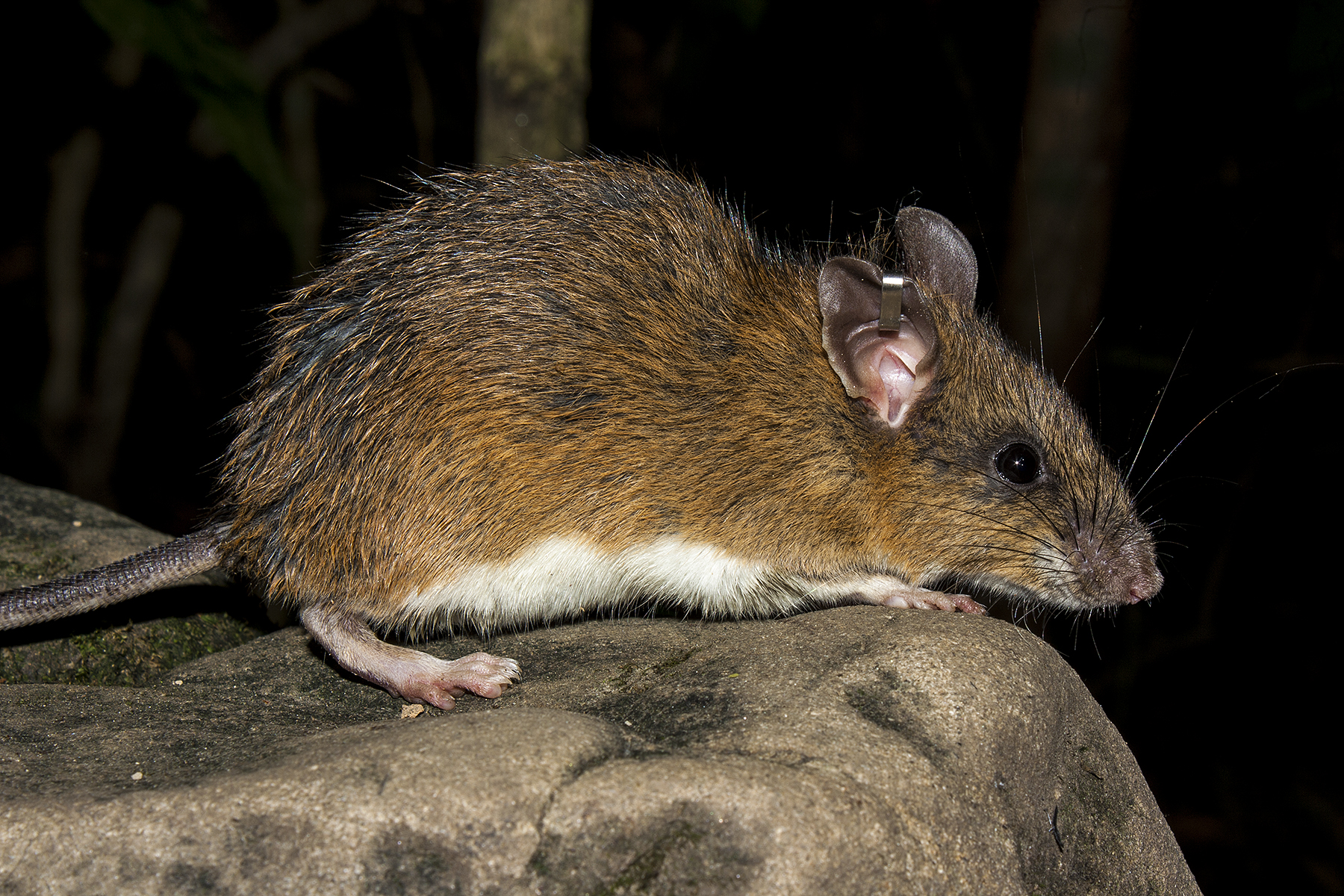

==== Genus: Rattus ====
Species:

- Sunburned rat (Rattus adustus) DD/
- Annandale's rat (Rattus annandalei) LC/
- Ricefield rat (Rattus argentiventer) LC/
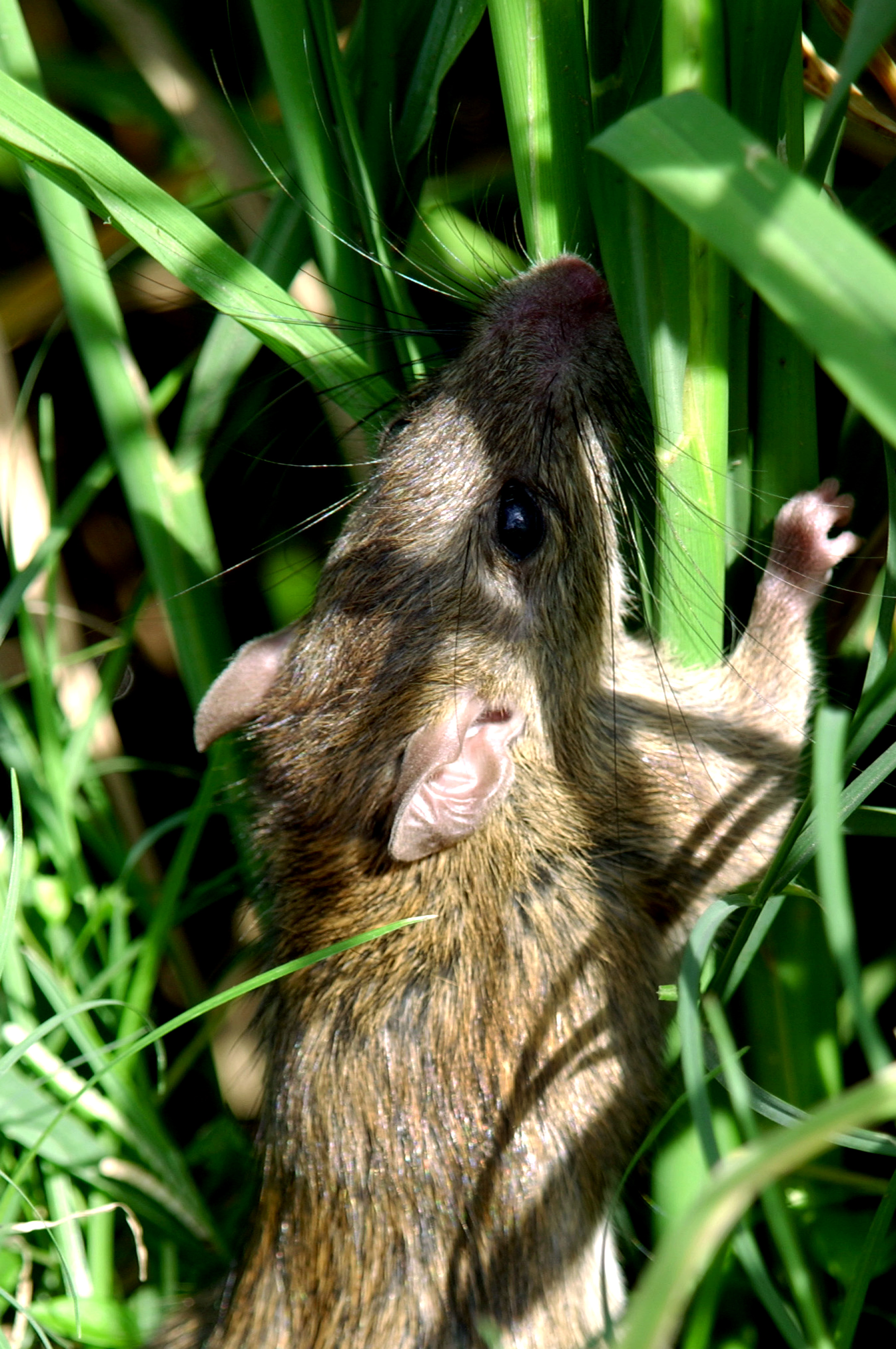
- Enggano rat (Rattus enganus) CR/
- Hoogerwerf's rat (Rattus hoogerwerfi) VU/
- Korinch's rat (Rattus korinchi) LC/
- Mentawai rat (Rattus lugens) LC/
- Simalur rat (Rattus simalurensis) LC/

==== Genus: Sundamys ====
Species:

- Mountain giant Sunda rat (Sundamys infraluteus) LC/
- Müller's giant Sunda rat (Sundamys muelleri) LC/

== Order: Scandentia ==
=== Family: Tupaiidae ===
==== Genus: Tupaia ====
Species:

- Golden-bellied treeshrew (Tupaia chrysogaster) EN/
- Common treeshrew (Tupaia glis) LC/
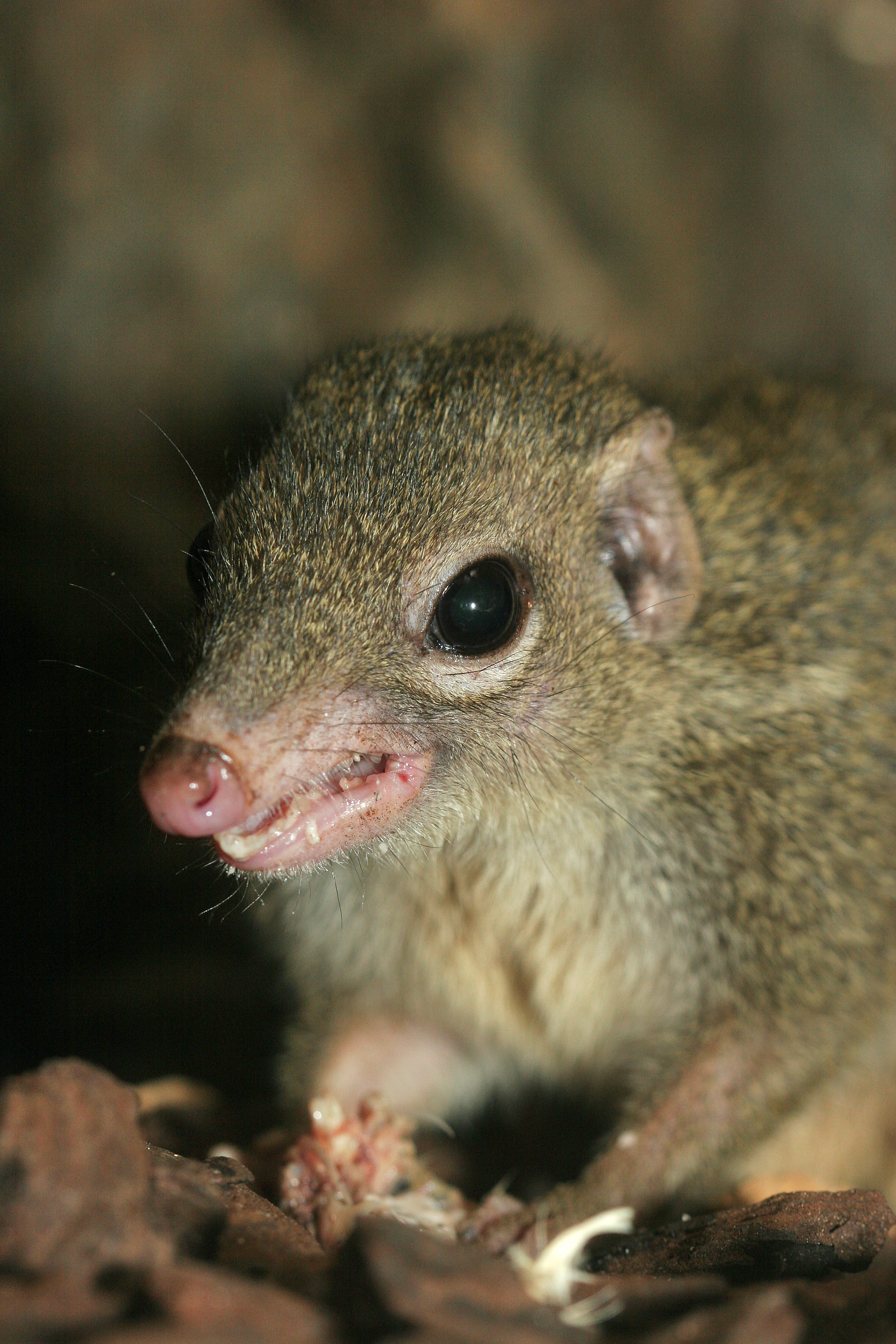

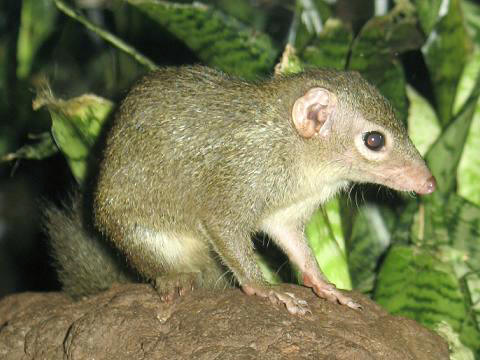
- Slender treeshrew (Tupaia gracilis) LC/
- Horsfield's treeshrew (Tupaia javanica) LC/
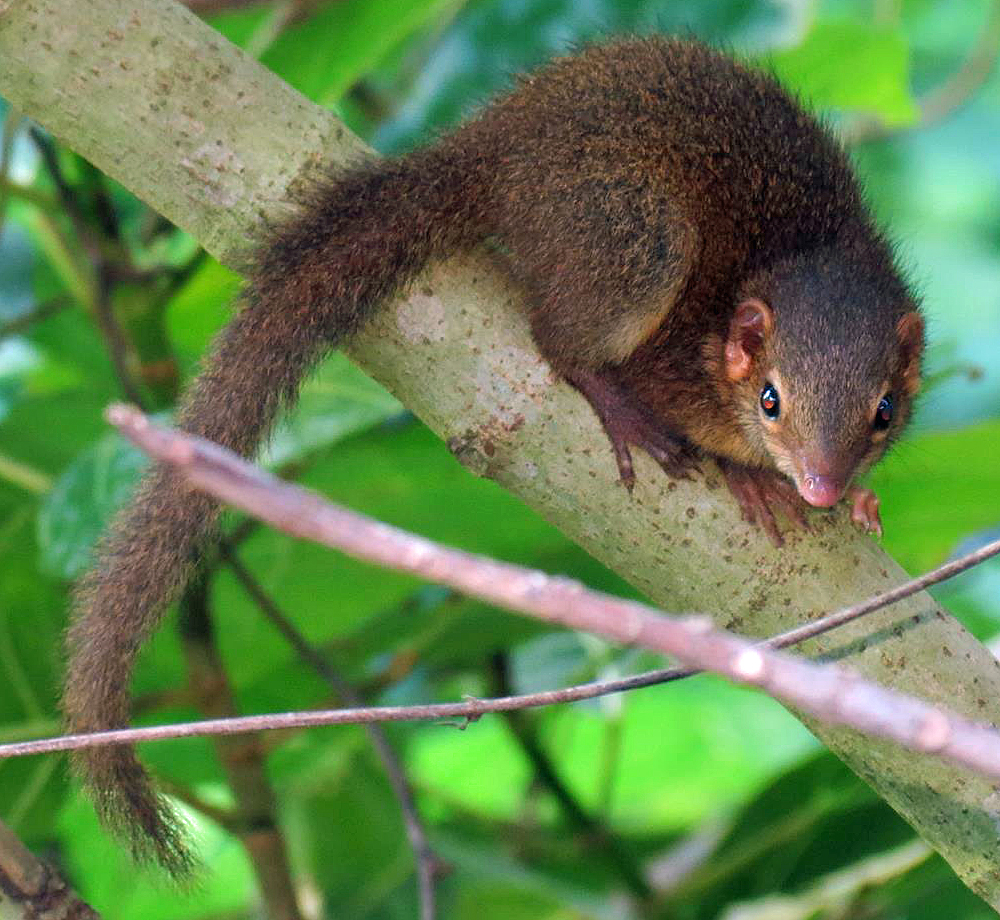

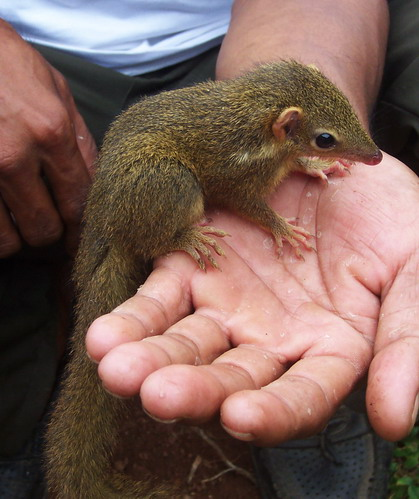
- Pygmy treeshrew (Tupaia minor) LC/
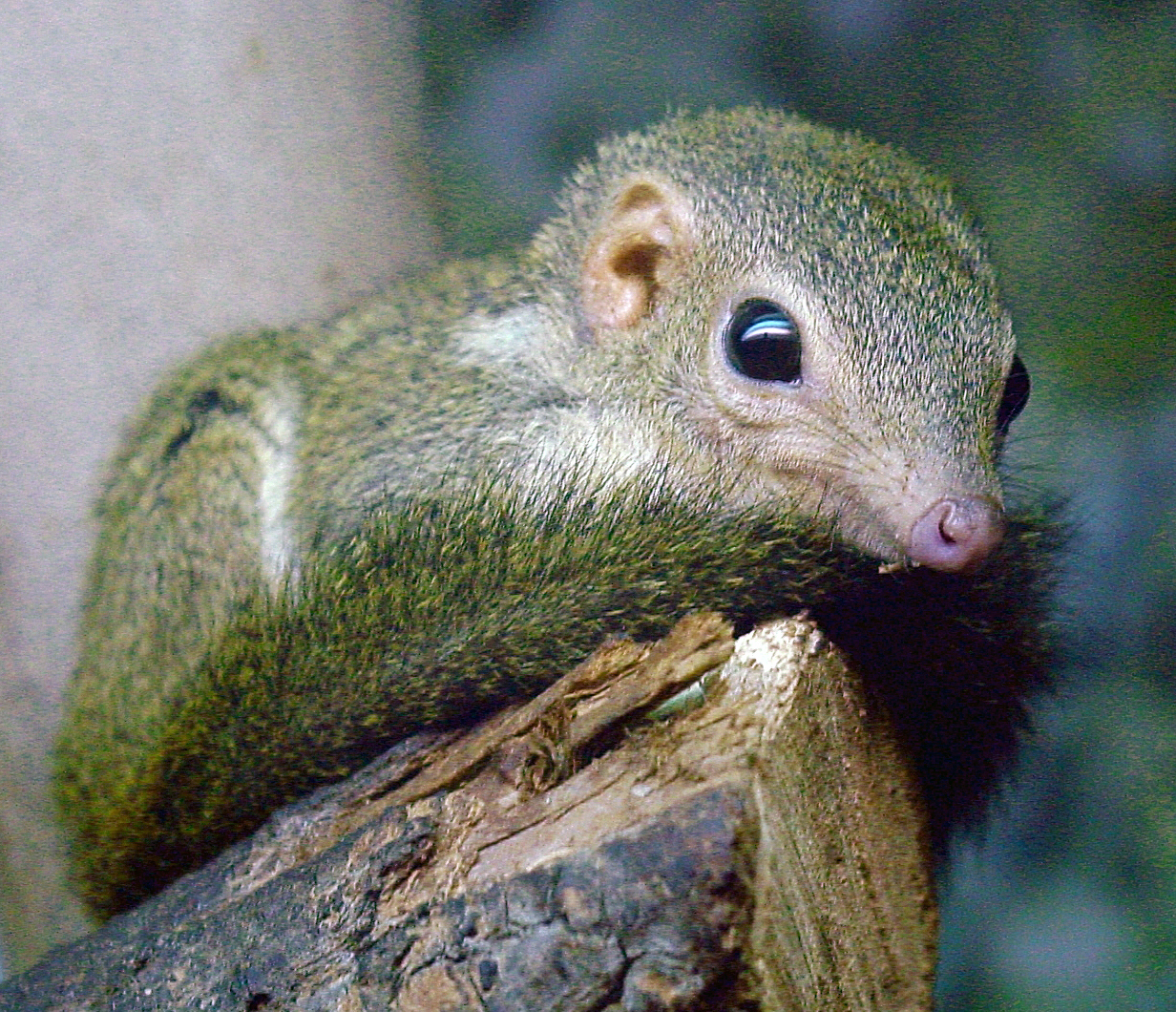

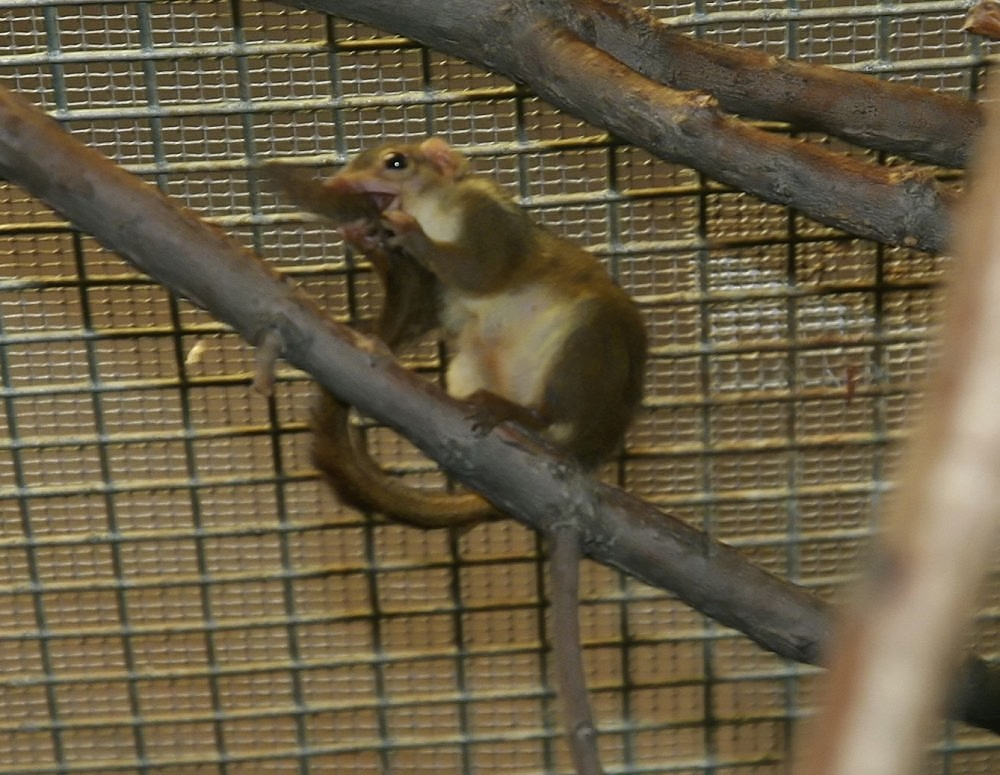
- Large treeshrew (Tupaia tana) LC/
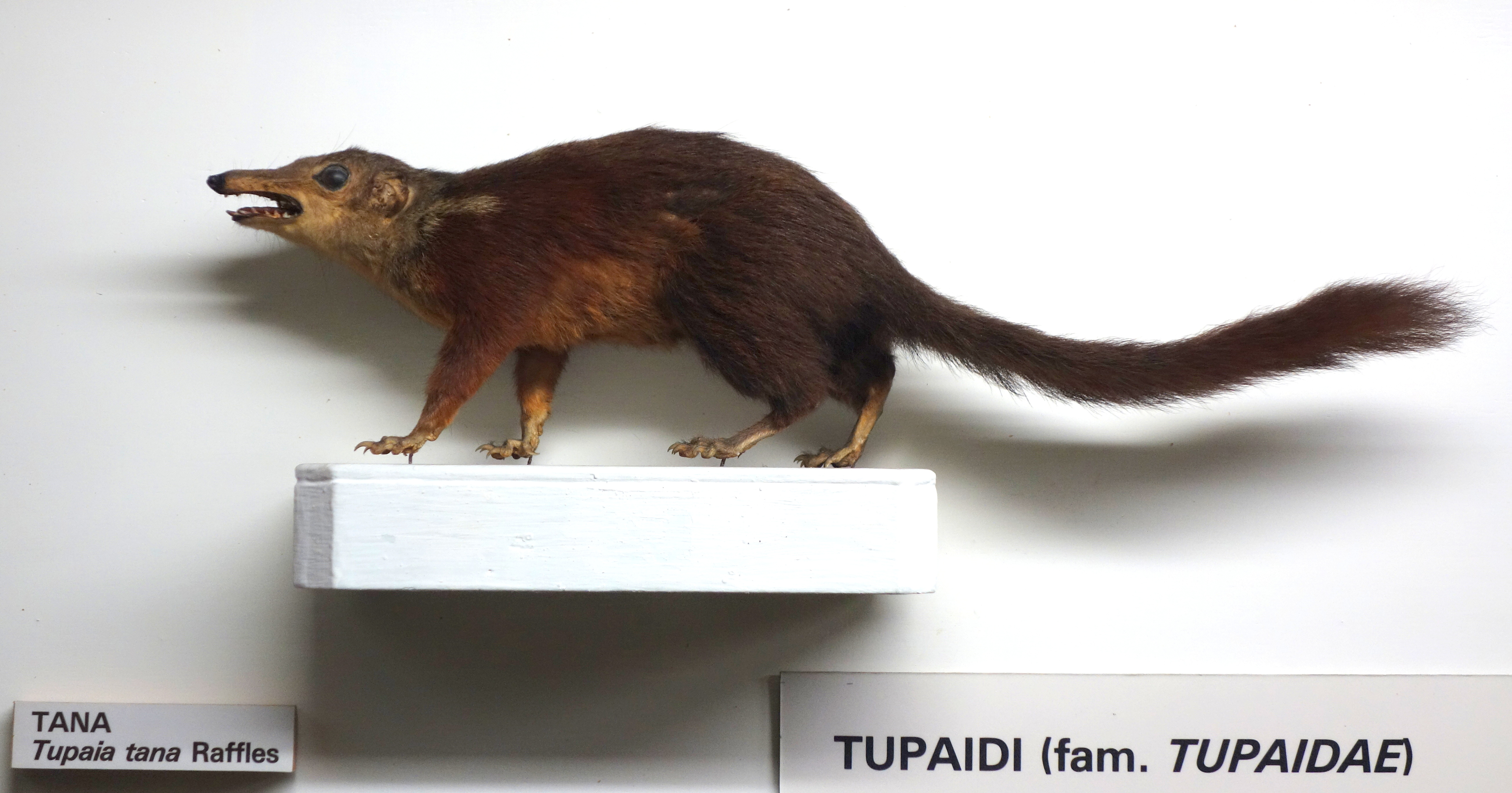

=== Family: Ptilocercidae ===
==== Genus: Ptilocercus ====
Species: Pen-tailed treeshrew (Ptilocercus lowii) LC/

== Order: Dermoptera ==
=== Family: Cynocephalidae ===
==== Genus: Galeopterus ====
Species: Sunda flying lemur (Galeopterus variegatus) LC/

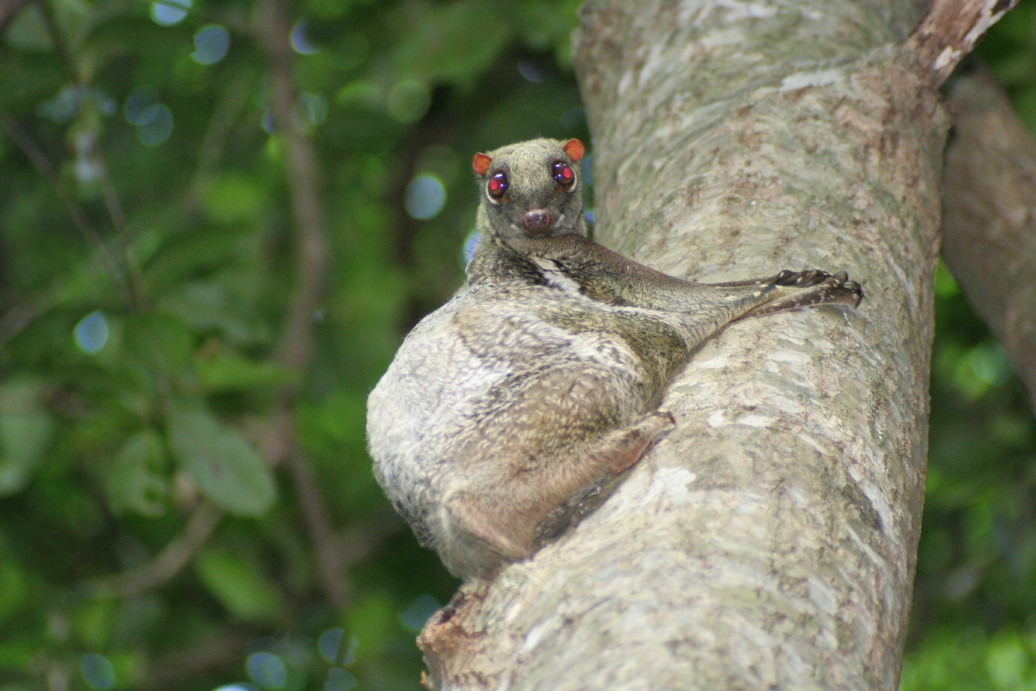

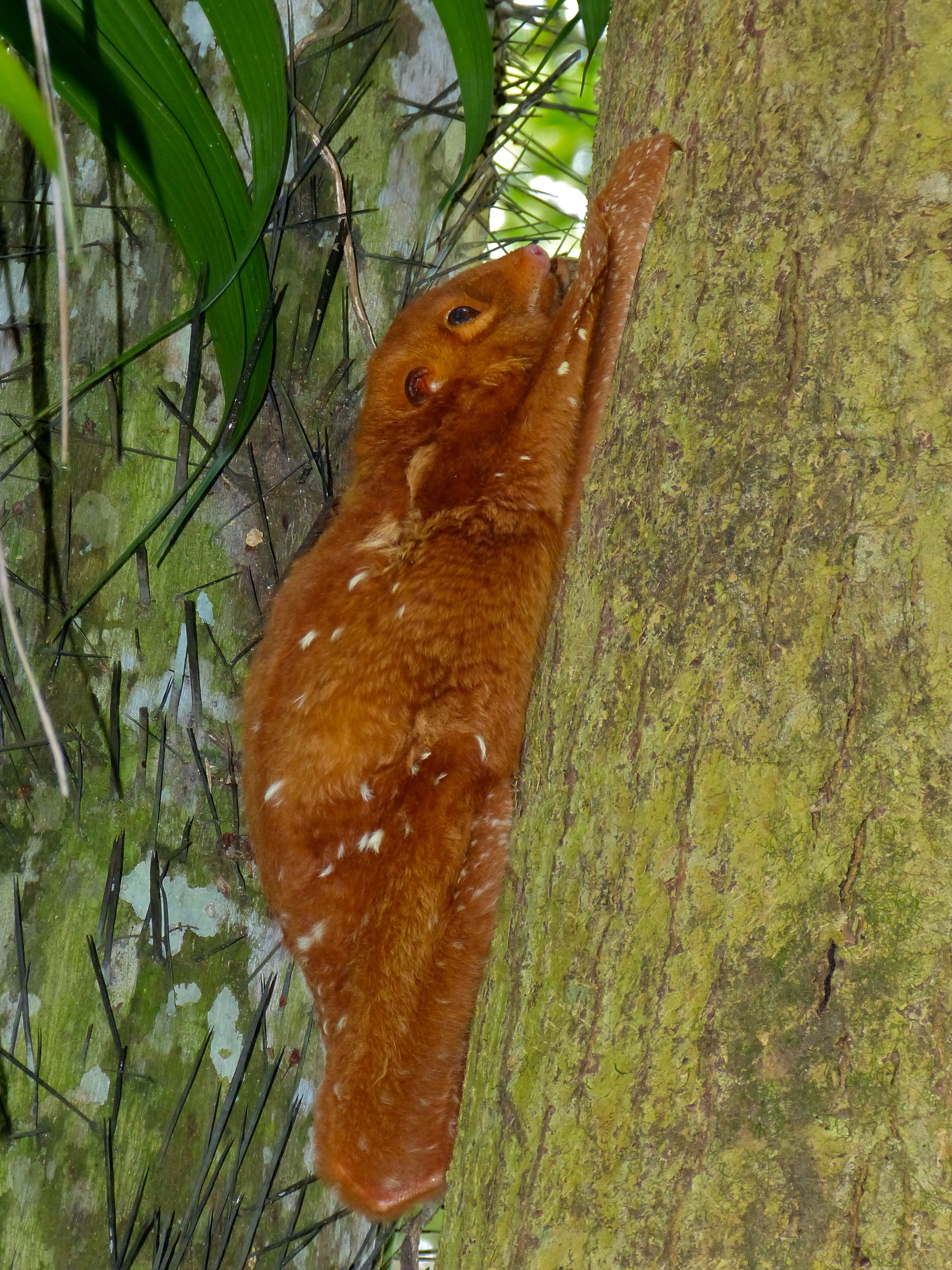

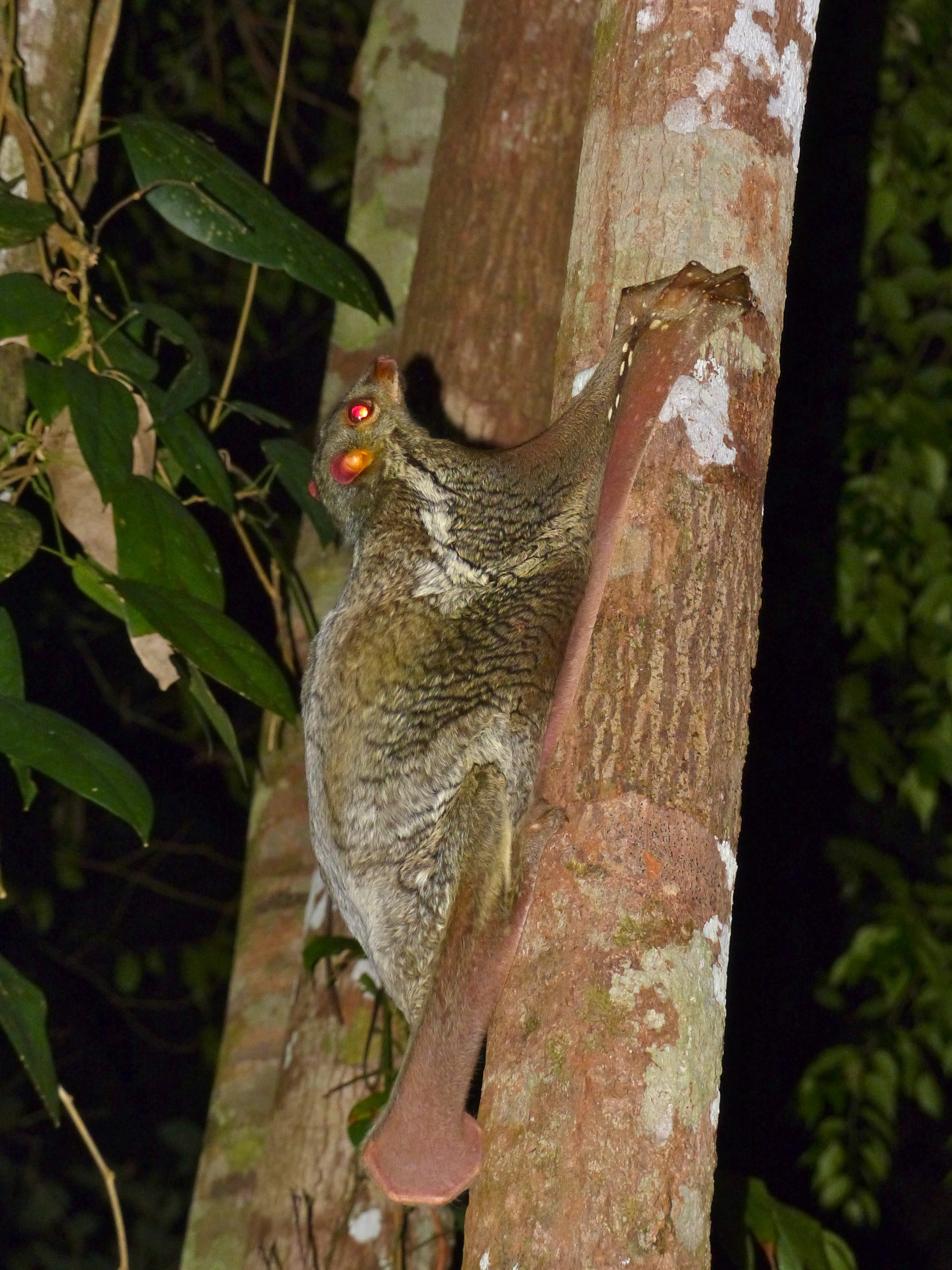

== Order: Primates ==
=== Family: Lorisidae ===
==== Genus: Nycticebus ====
Species:

- Bangka slow loris (Nycticebus bancanus)
- Sunda slow loris (Nycticebus coucang)
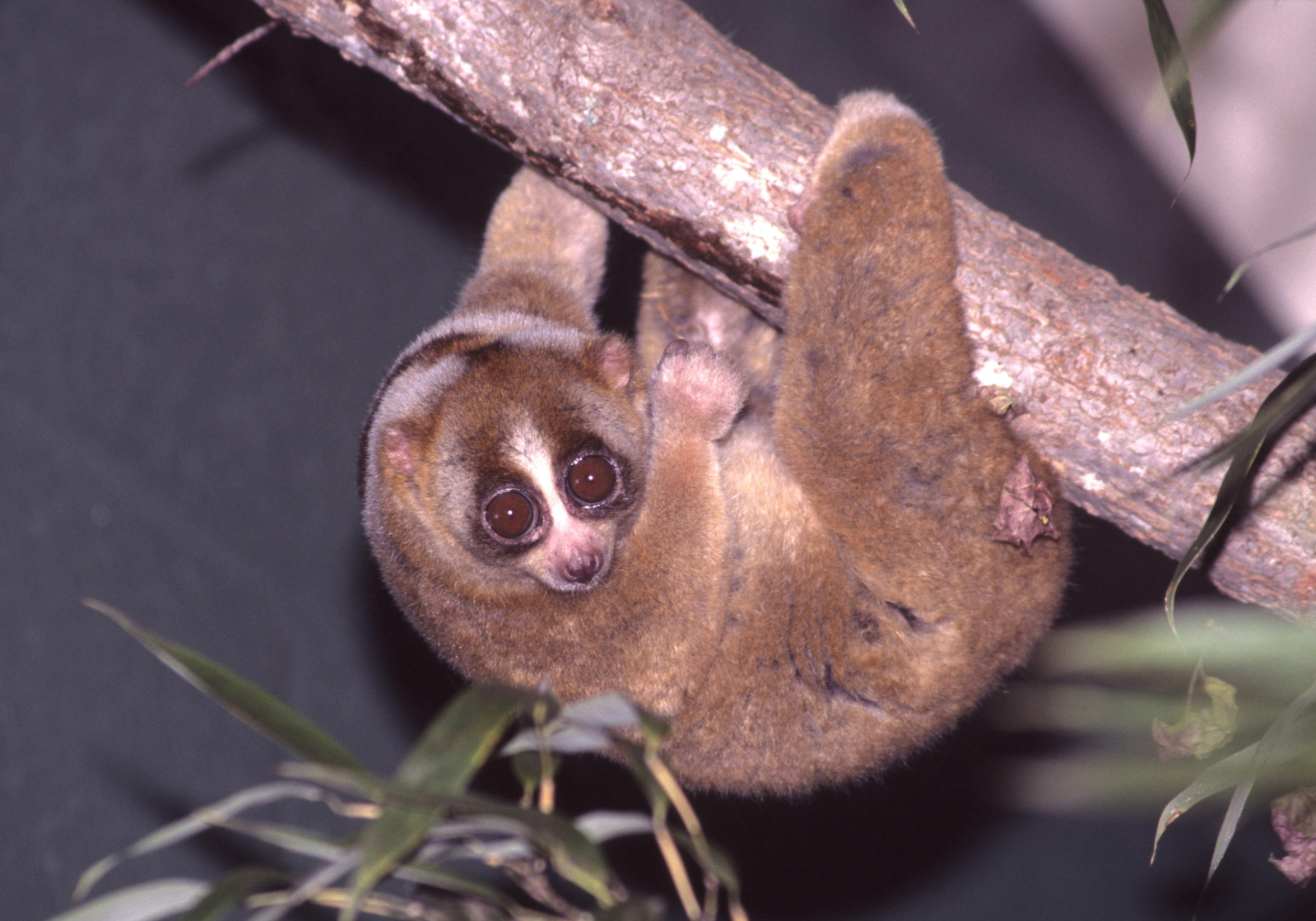

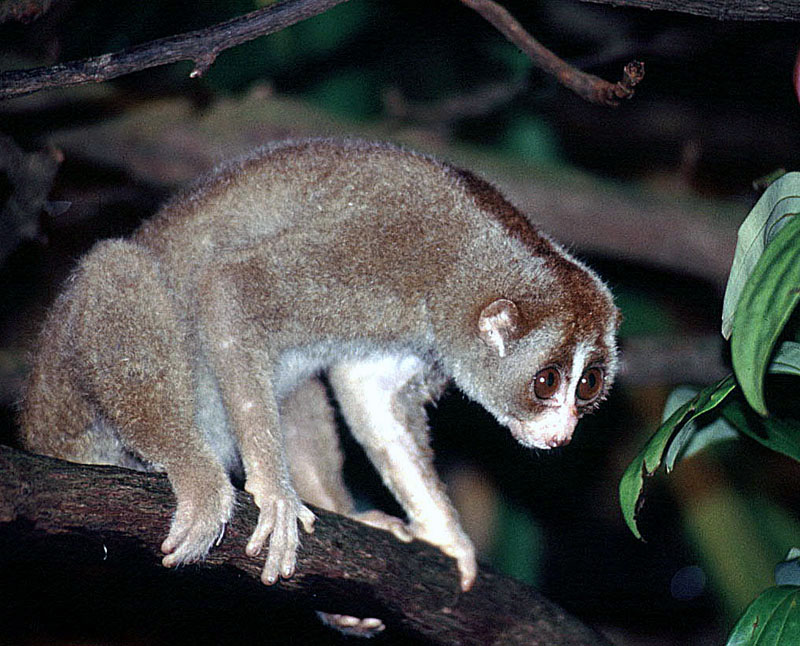

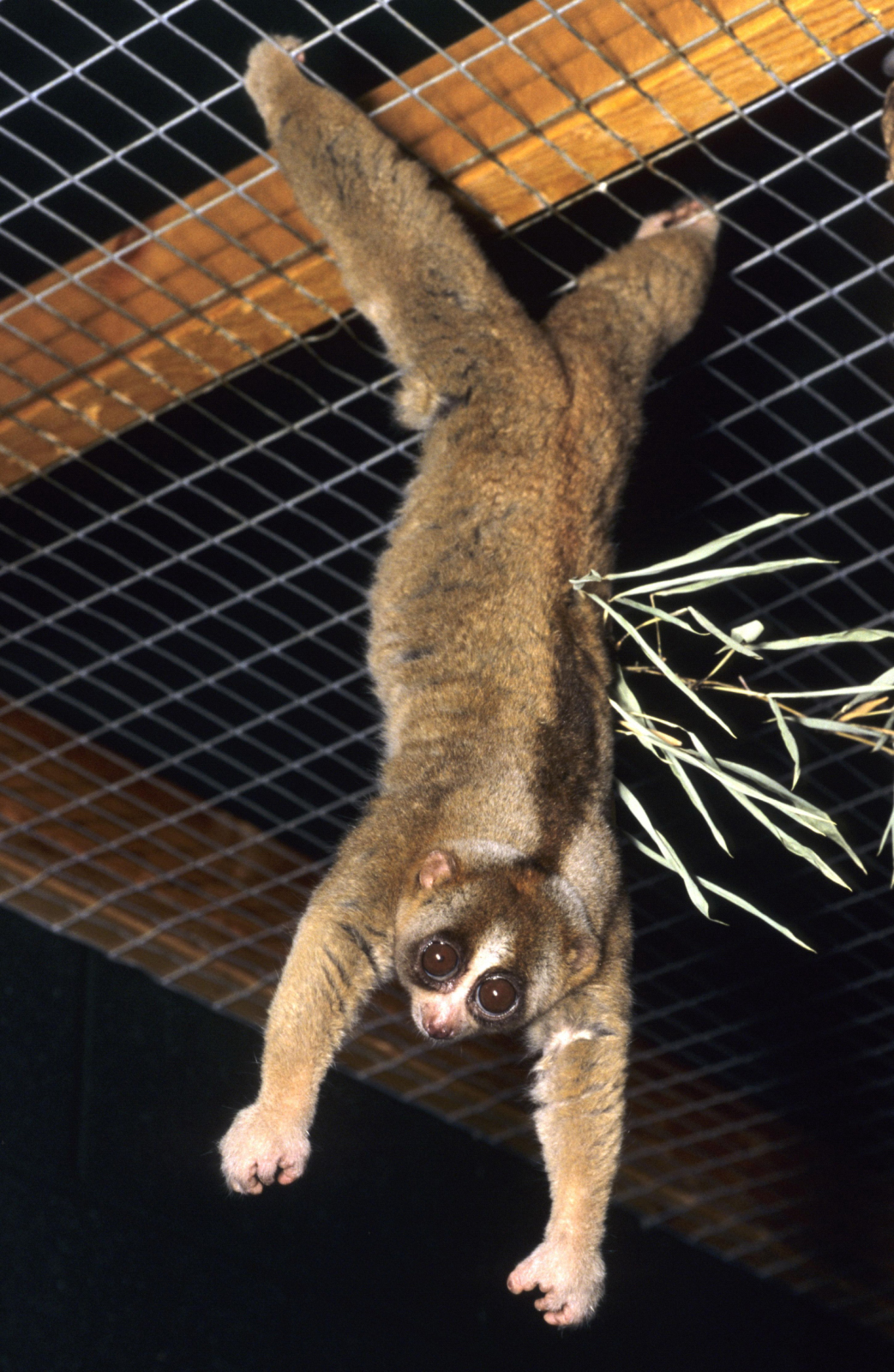

=== Family: Tarsiidae ===
==== Genus: Cephalopachus ====
- Horsfield's tarsier (Cephalopachus bancanus) VU/
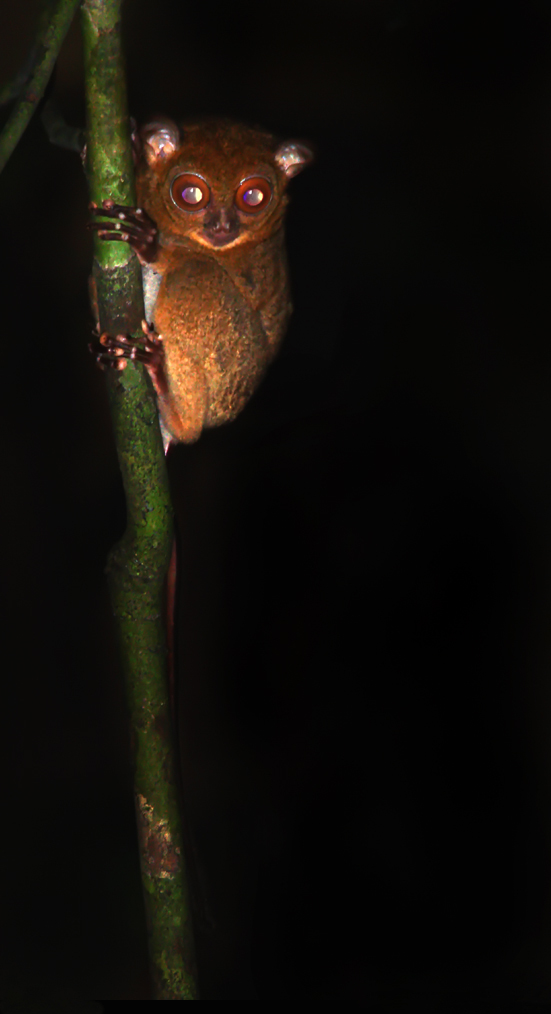

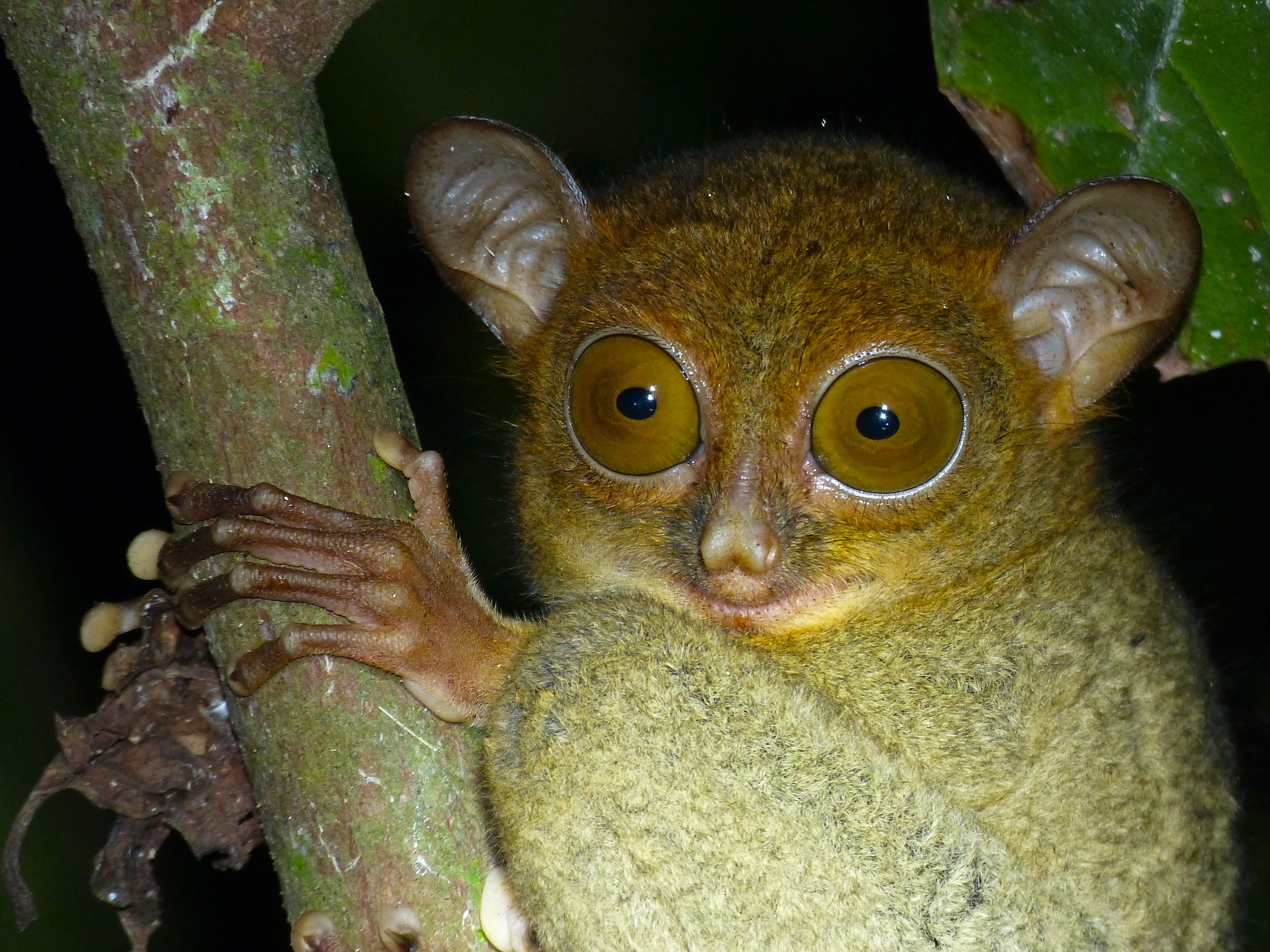

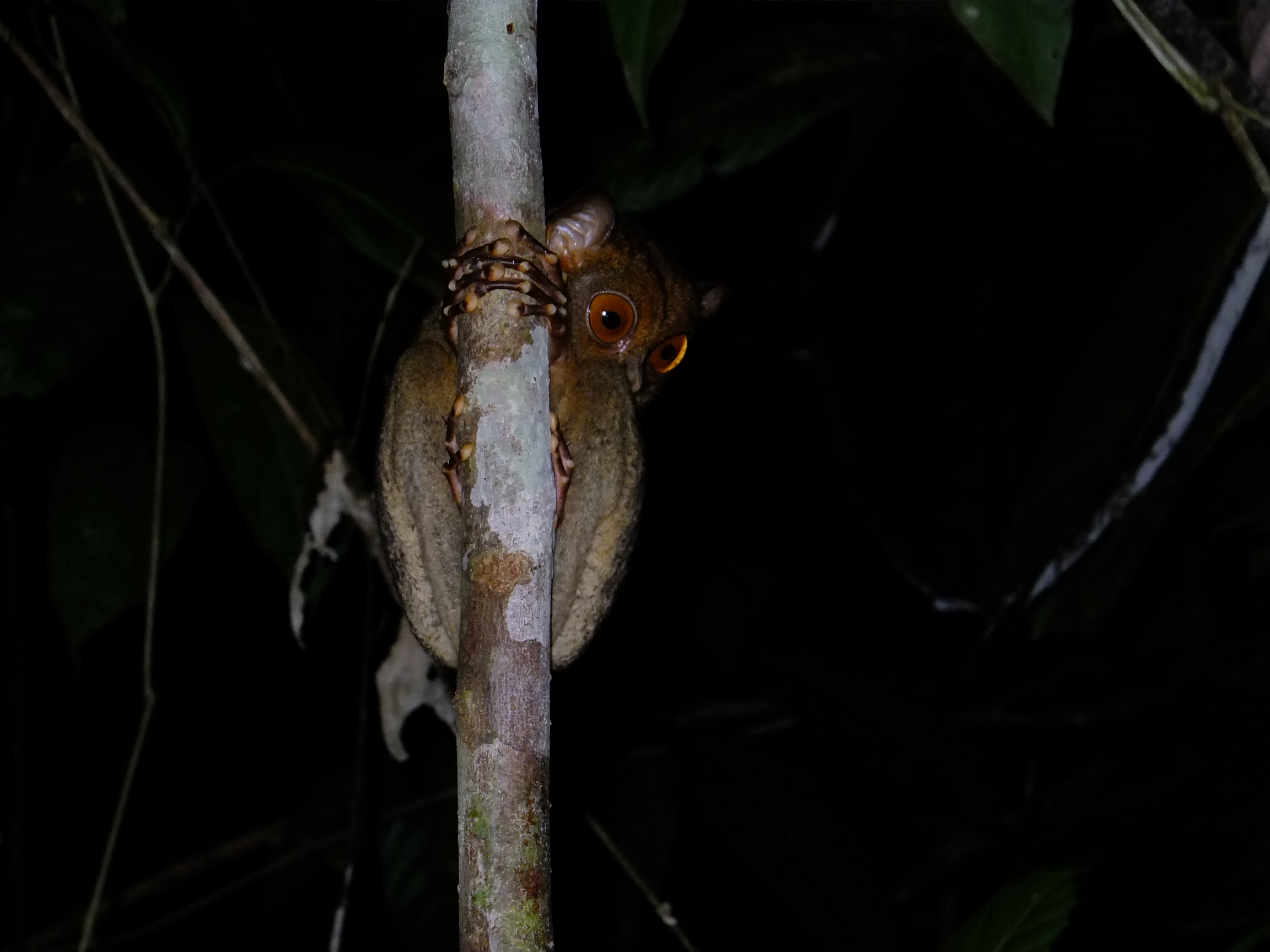

=== Family: Cercopithecidae ===
==== Genus: Macaca ====
Species:

- Crab-eating macaque (Macaca fascicularis) LC/
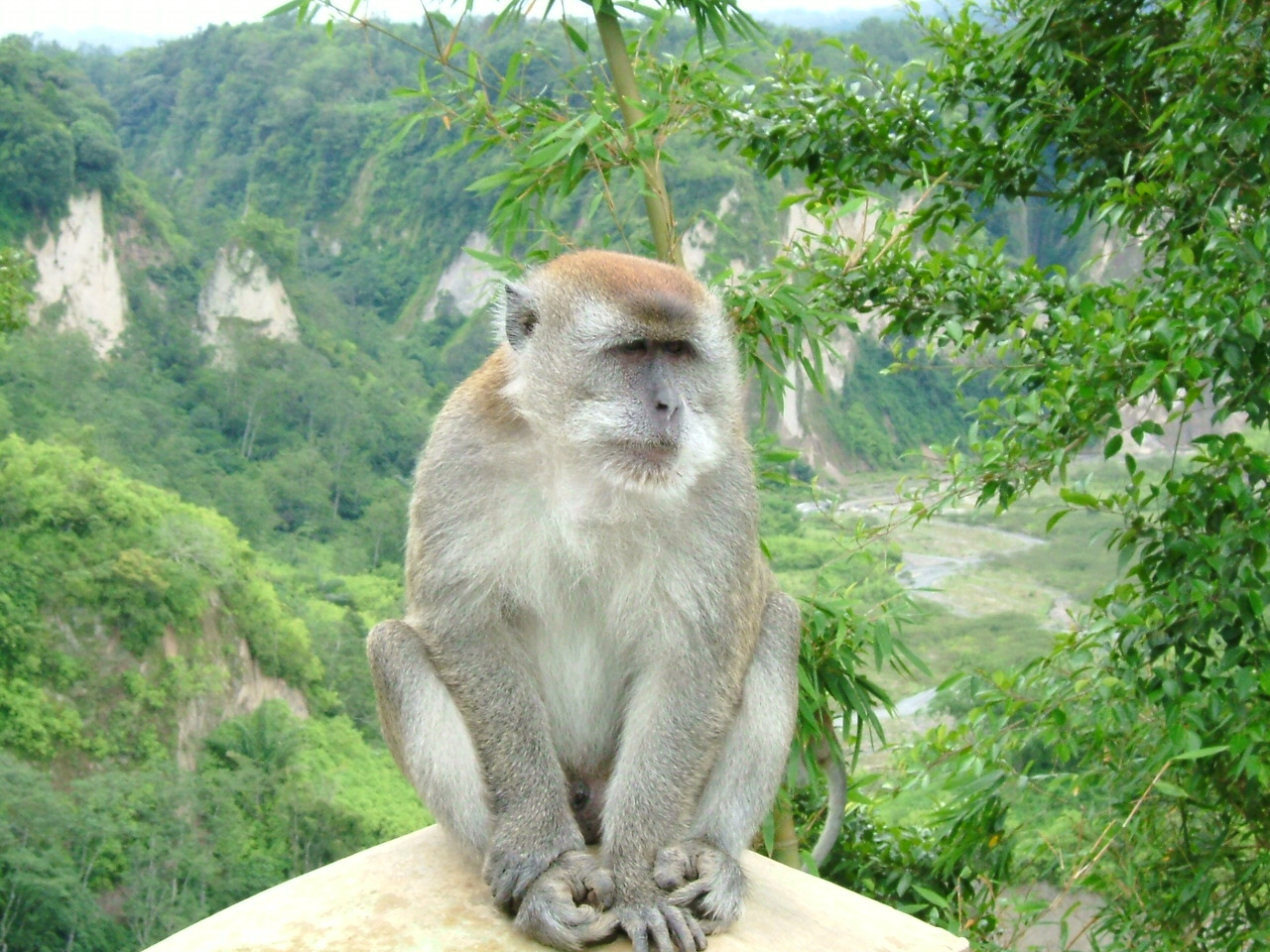

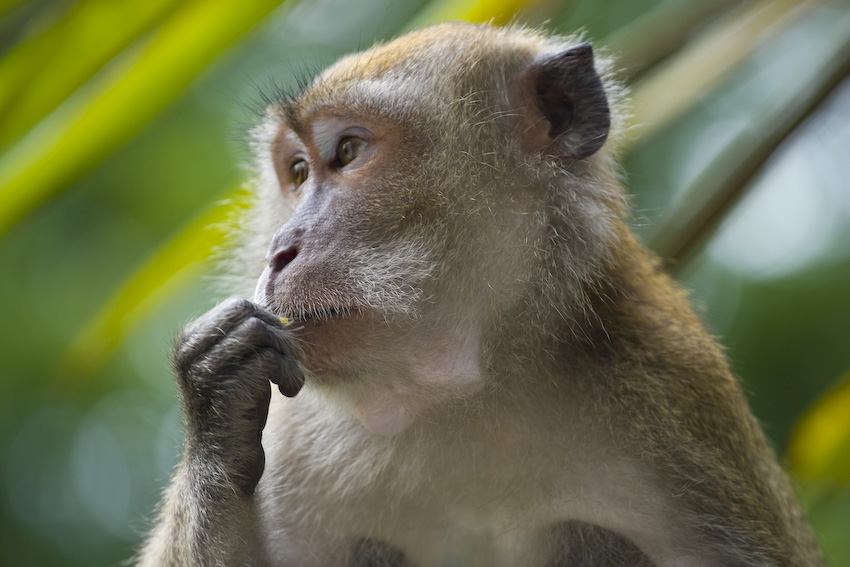

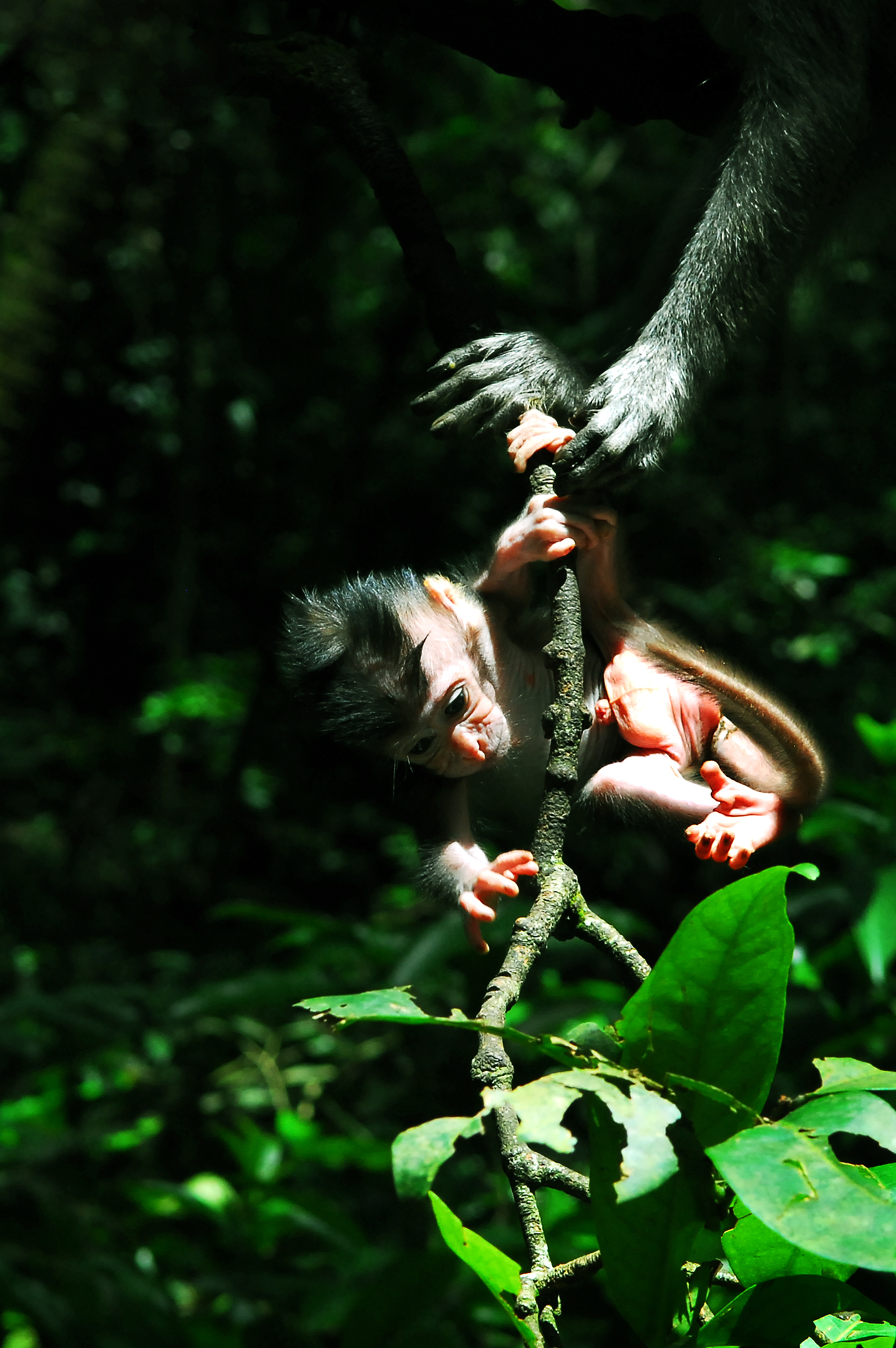
- Southern pig-tailed macaque (Macaca nemestrina) VU/
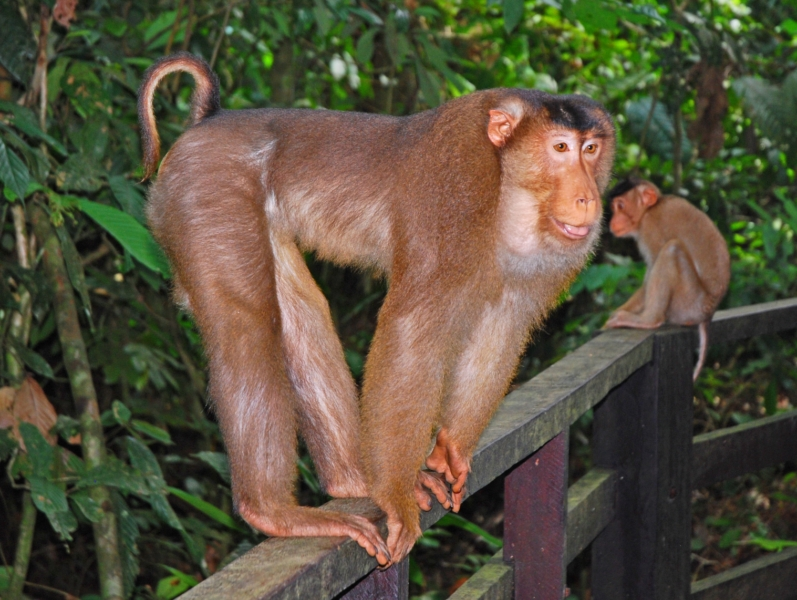

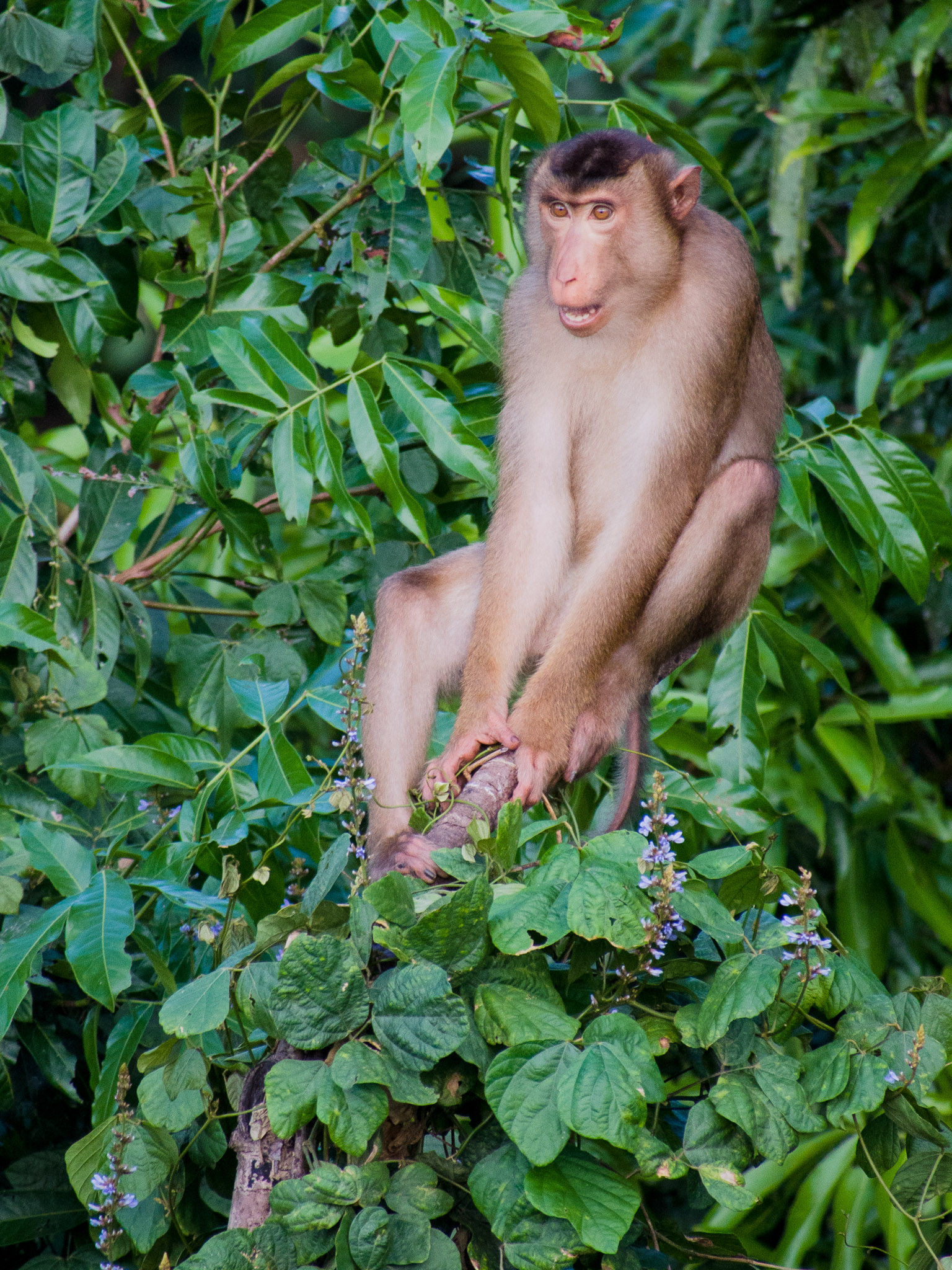

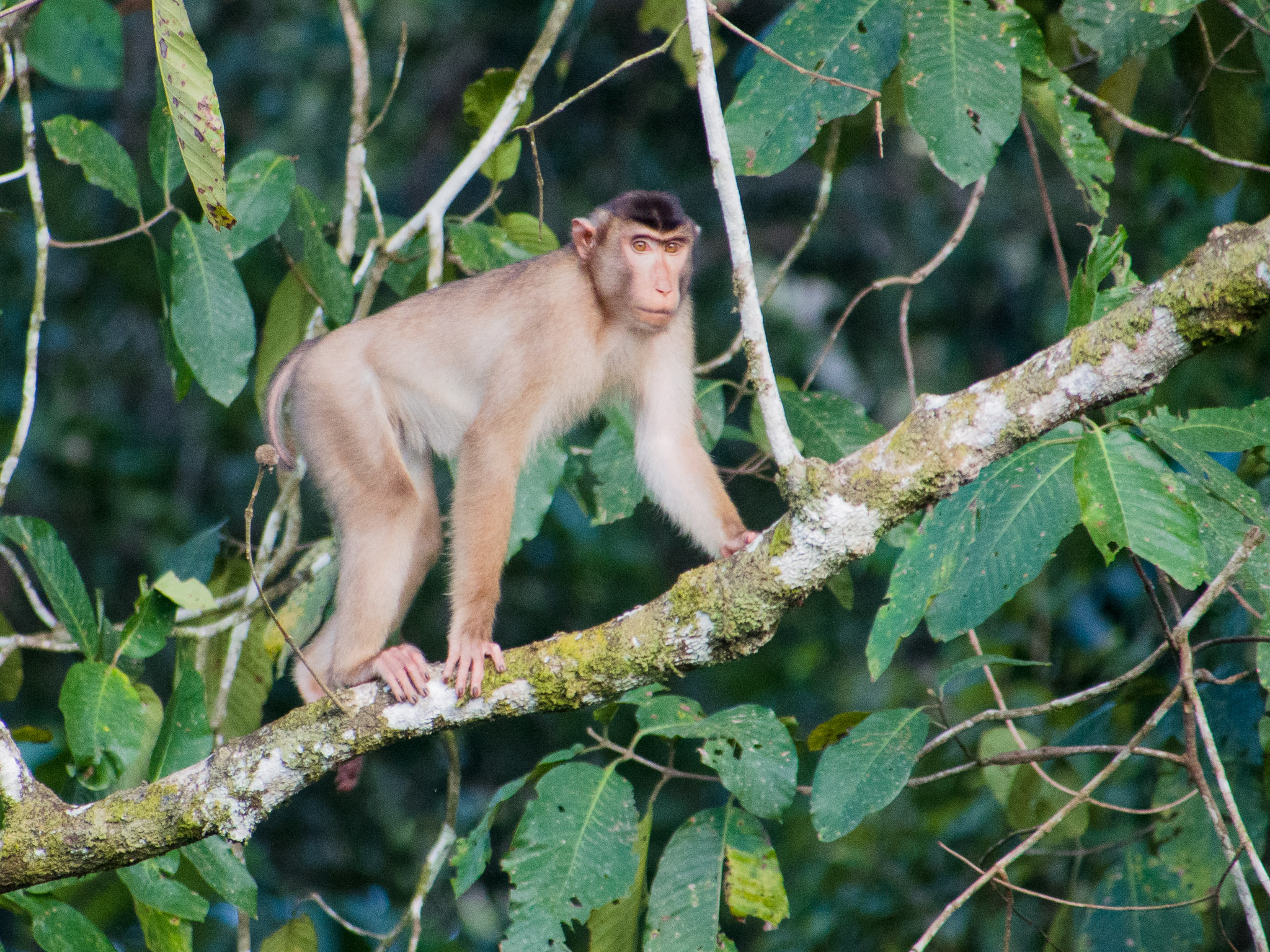
- Pagai Island macaque (Macaca pagensis) CR/
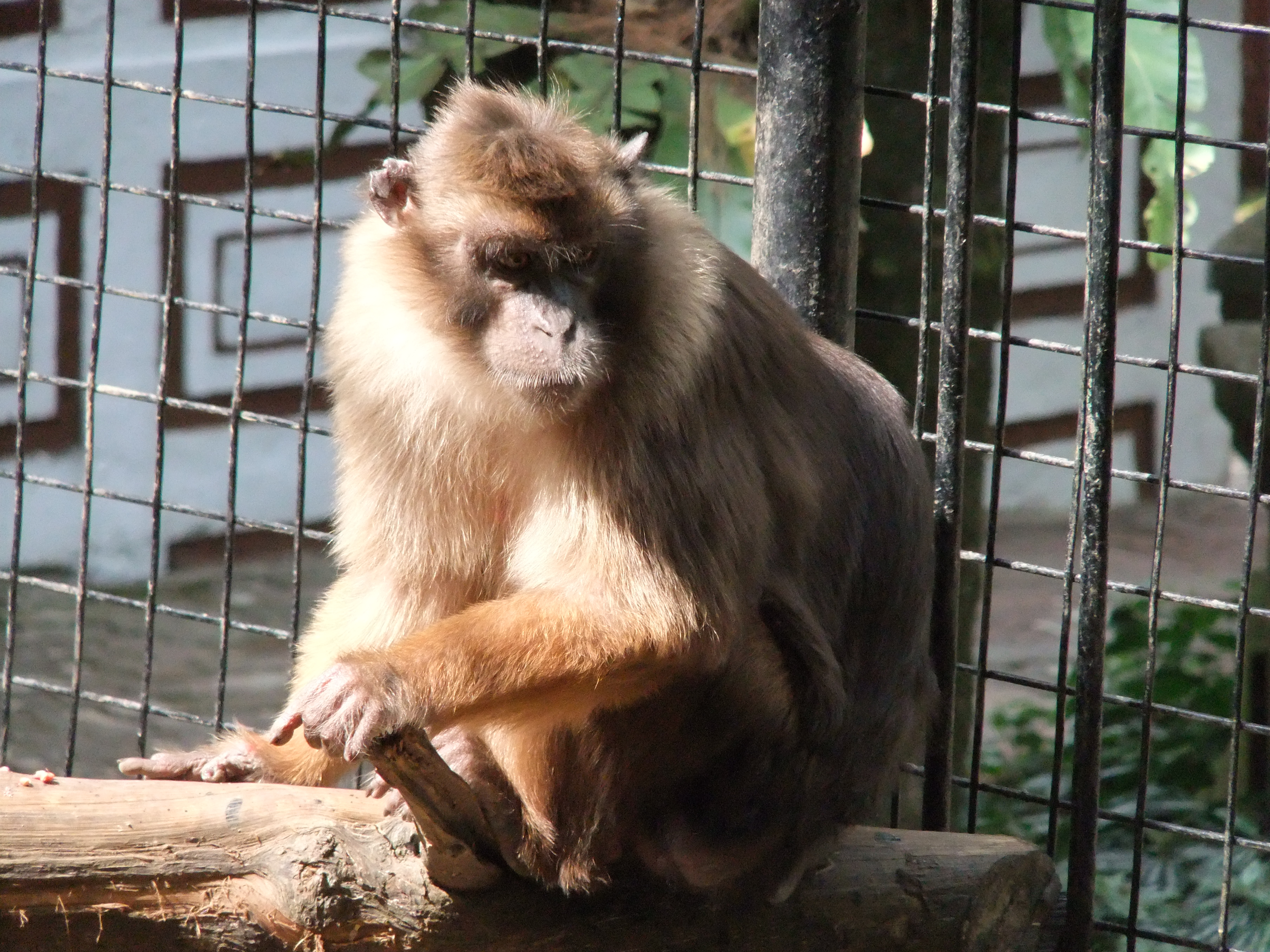

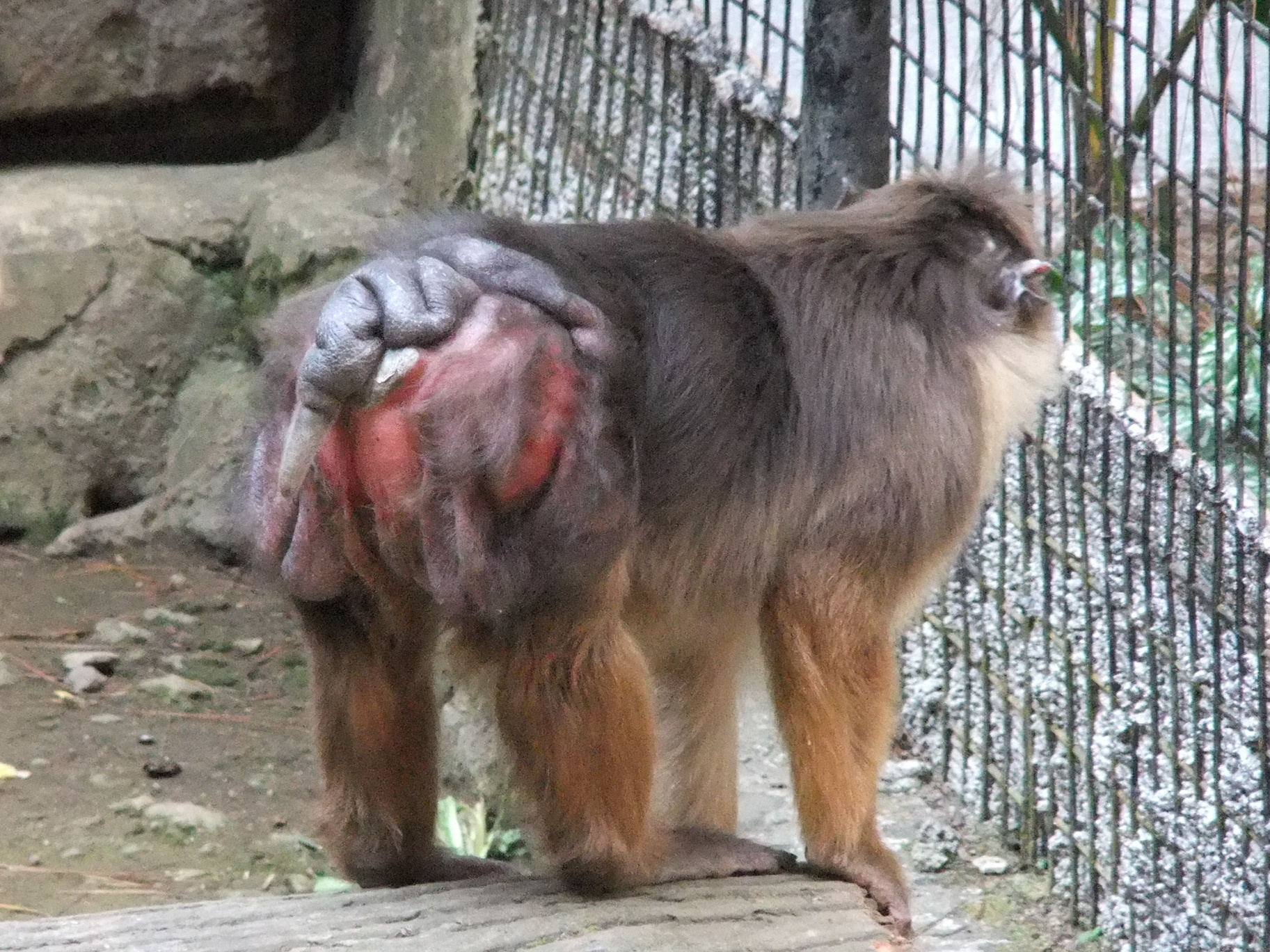
- Siberut macaque (Macaca siberu) VU/

==== Genus: Presbytis ====
Species:

- Banded surili (Presbytis femoralis) NT/
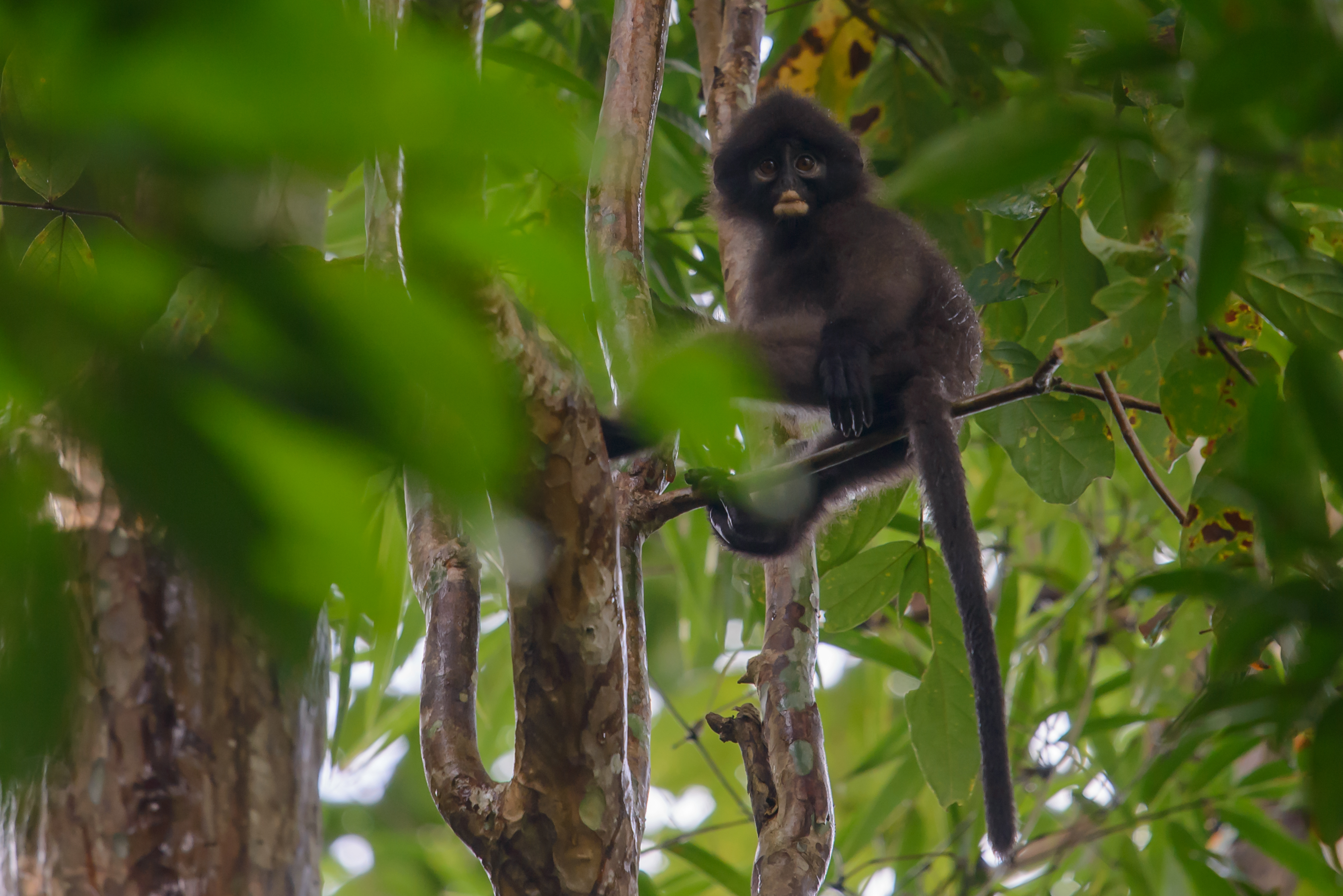
- Sumatran surili (Presbytis melalophos) EN/
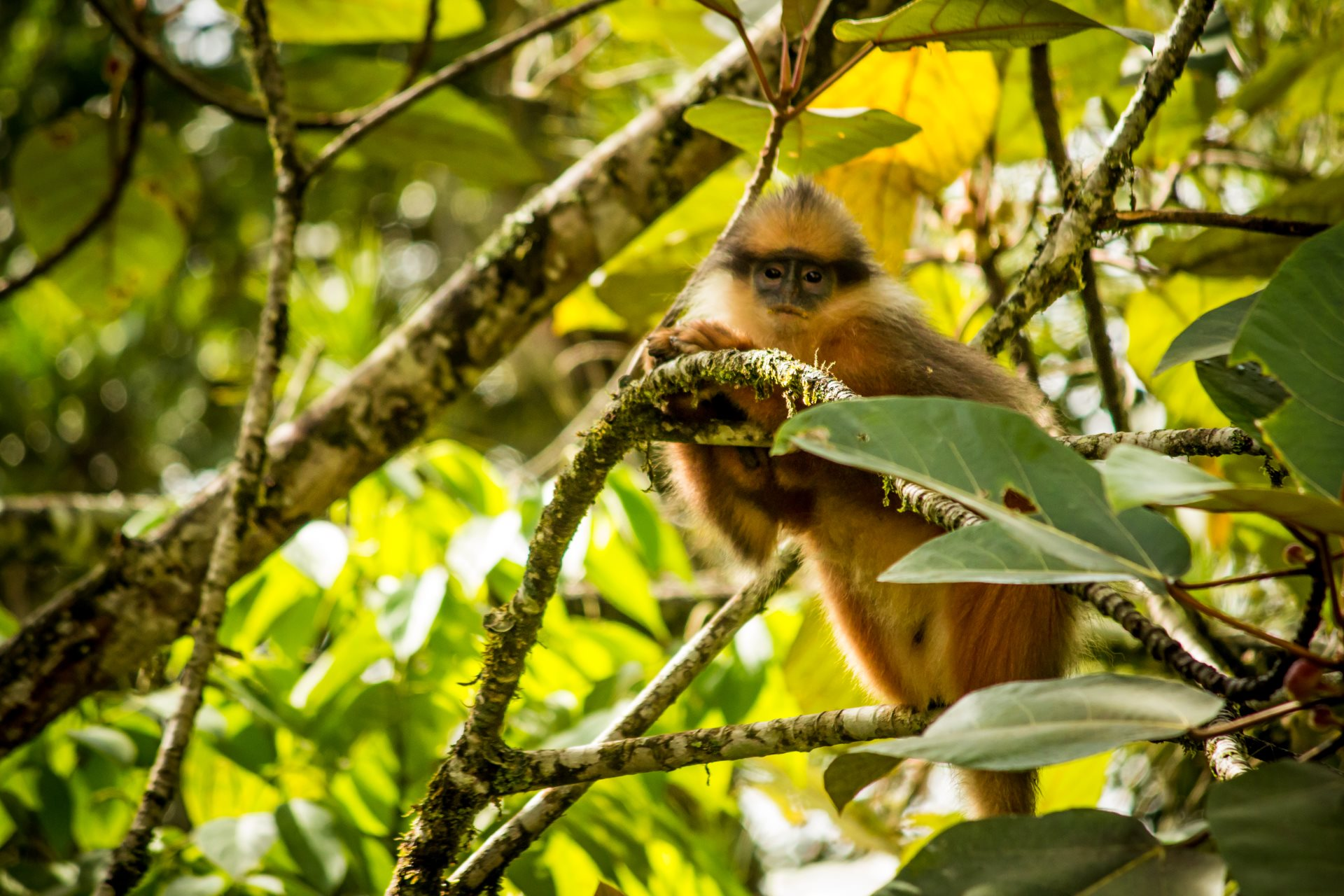
- Mentawai langur (Presbytis potenziani) EN/
- White-thighed surili (Presbytis siamensis) NT/
- Thomas's langur (Presbytis thomasi) VU/
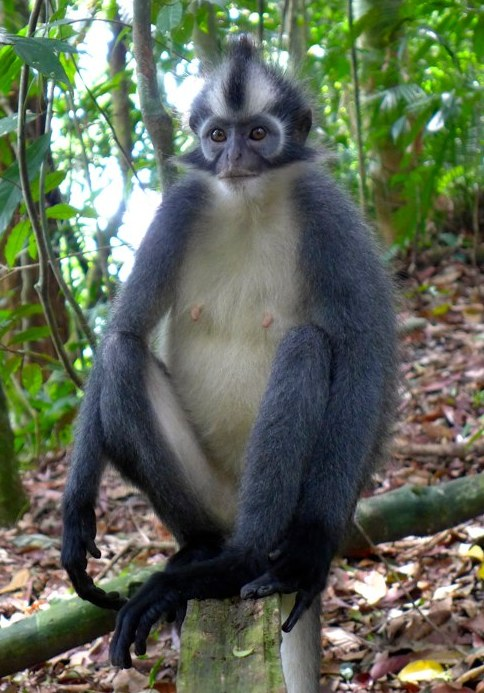

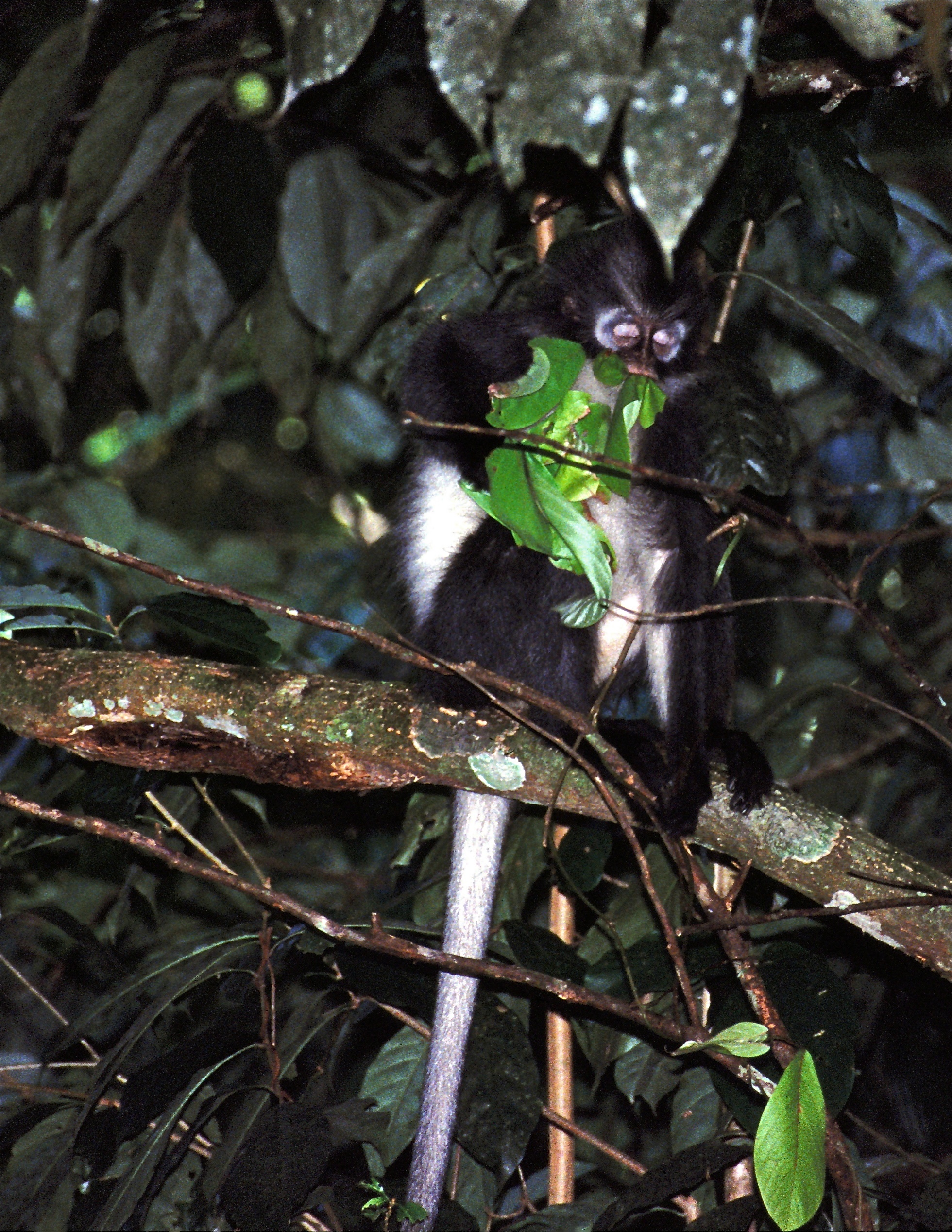

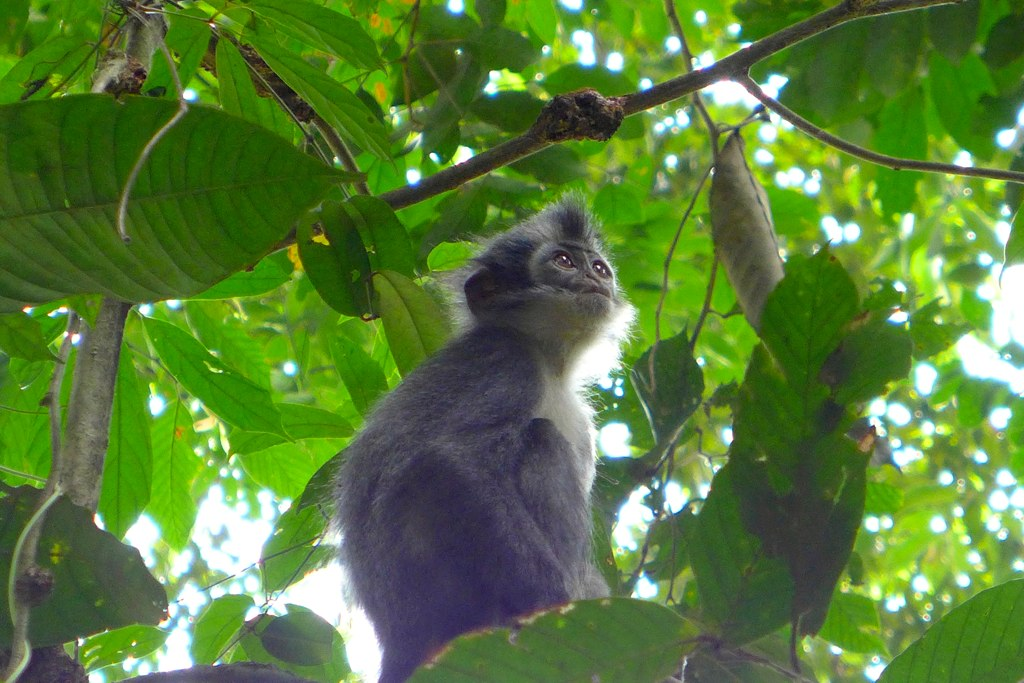

==== Genus: Simias ====
Species: Pig-tailed langur (Simias concolor) CR/

==== Genus: Trachypithecus ====
Species: Silvery lutung (Trachypithecus cristatus) NT/

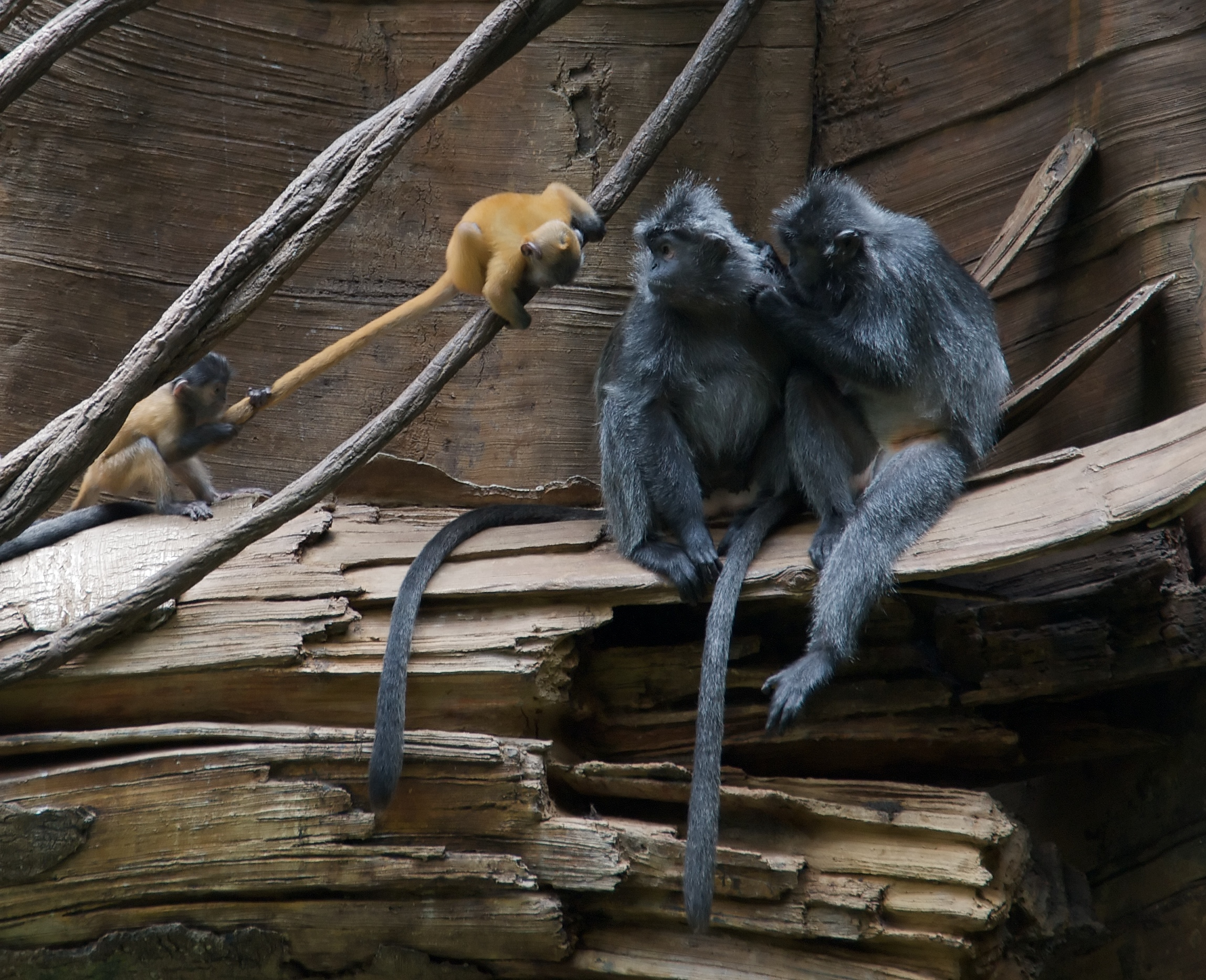

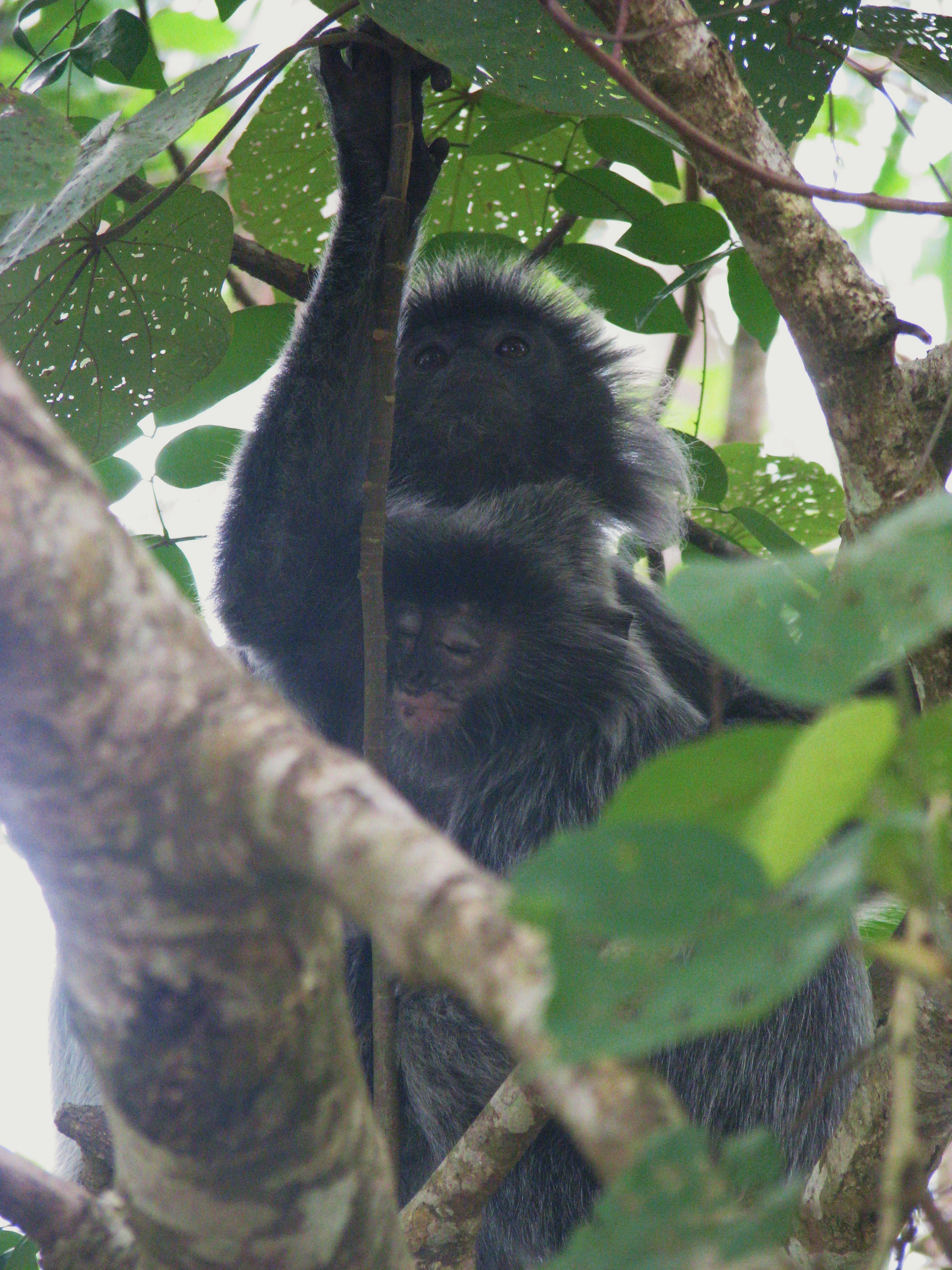

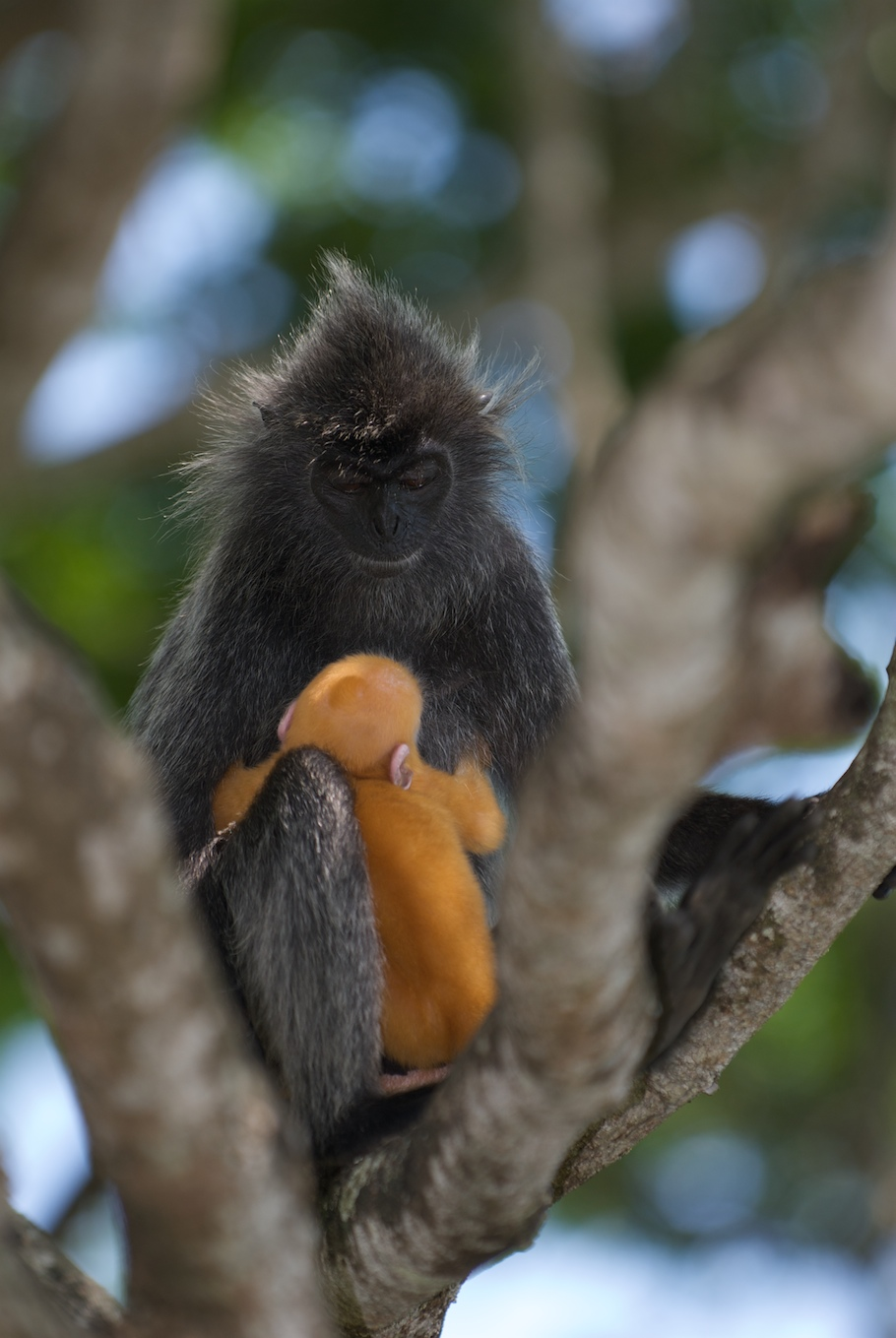

=== Family: Hylobatidae ===
==== Genus: Hylobates ====
Species:

- Agile gibbon (Hylobates agilis) EN/
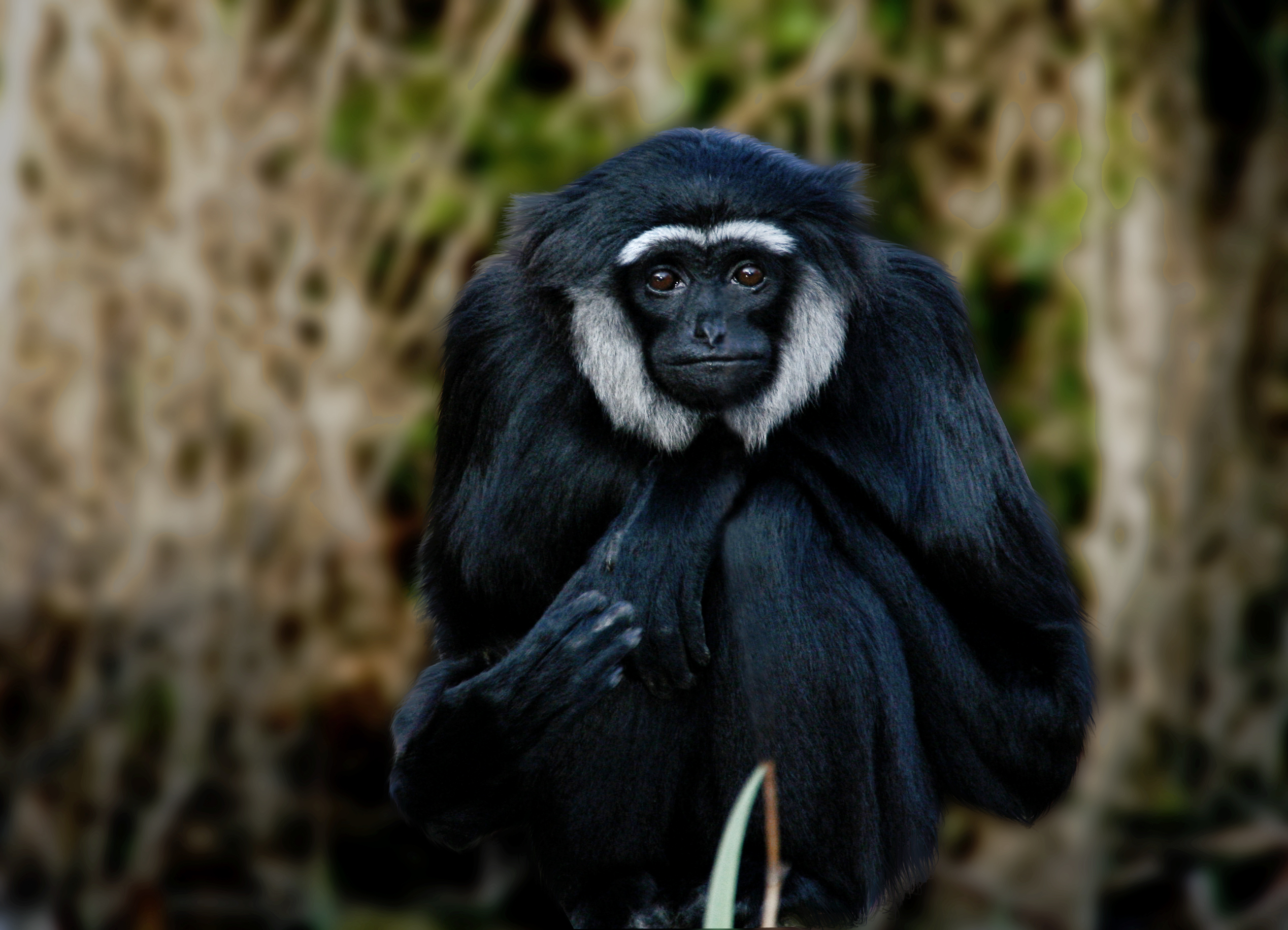
- Kloss's gibbon (Hylobates klossii) EN/
- Lar gibbon (Hylobates lar) EN/
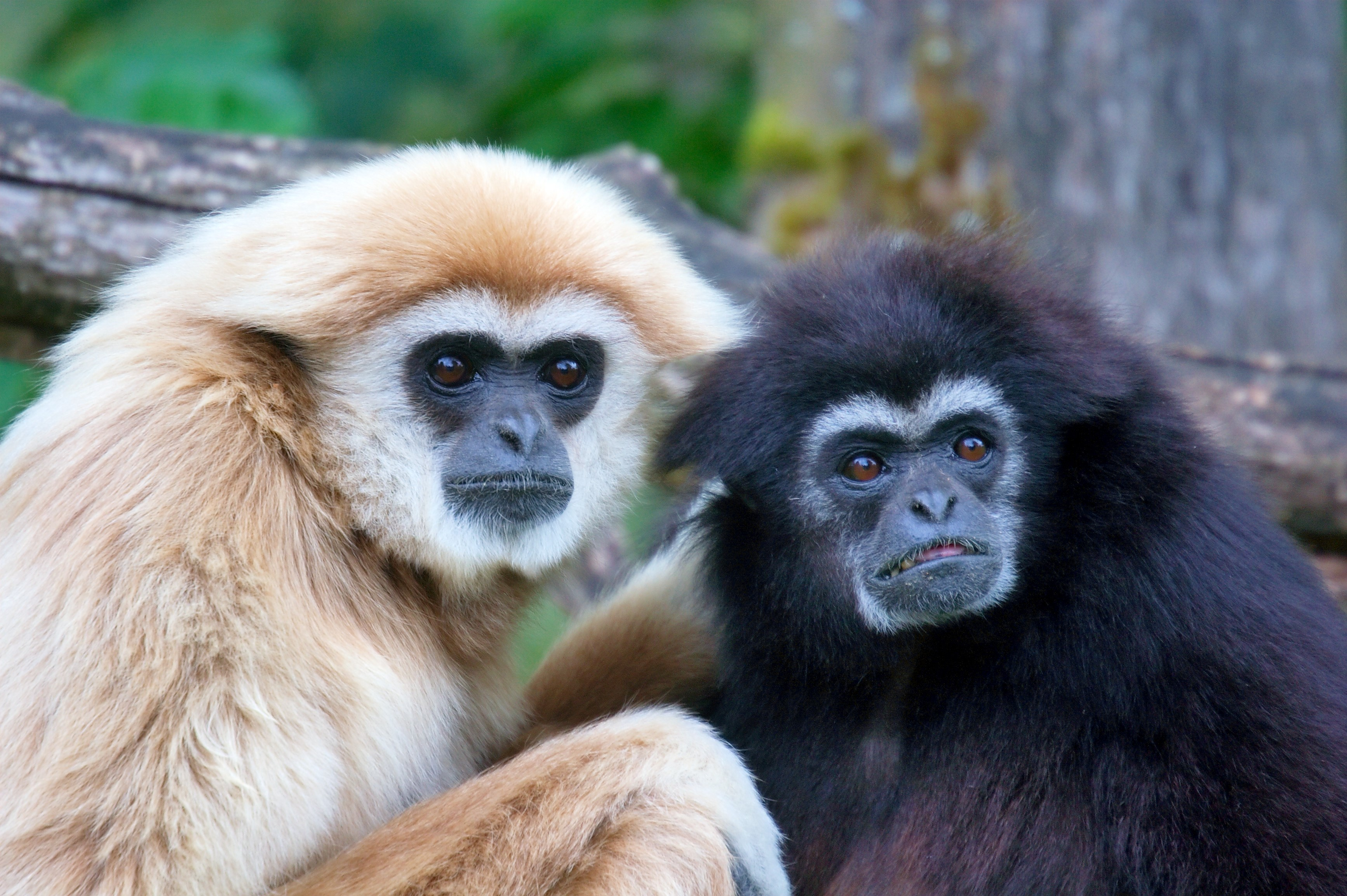

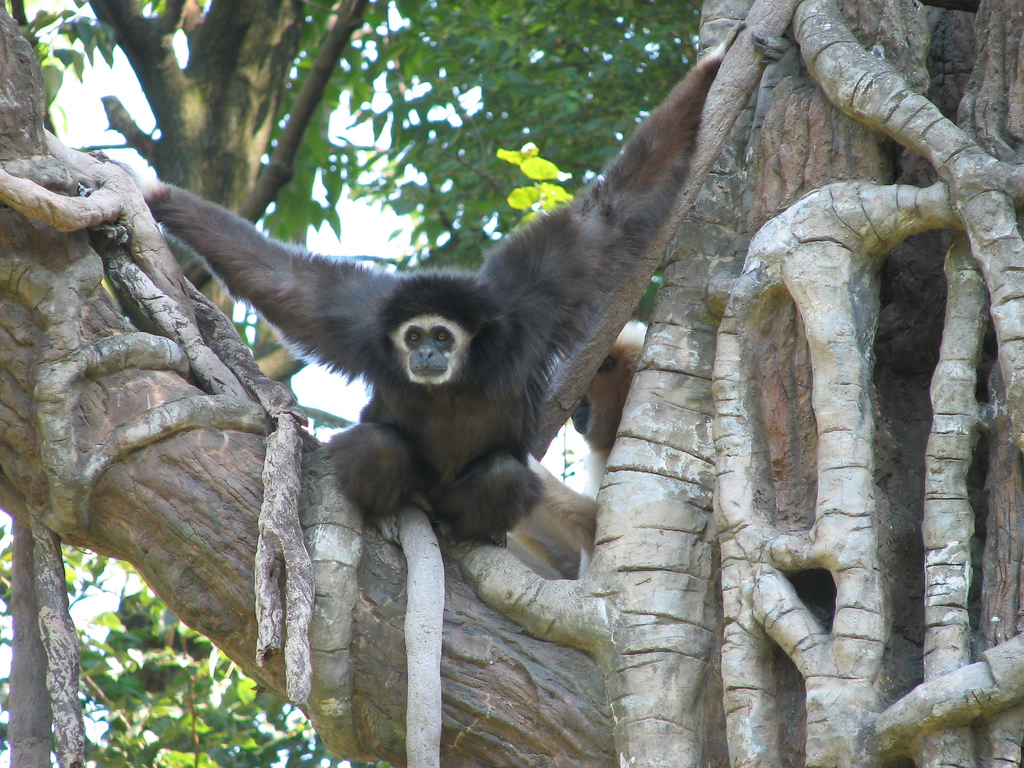

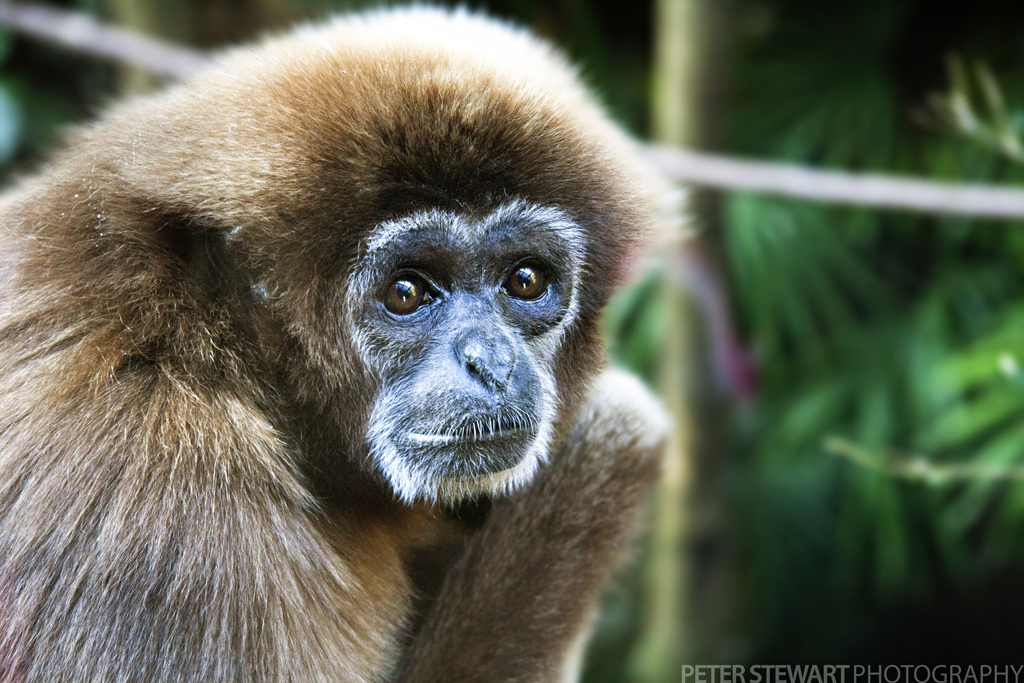

==== Genus: Symphalangus ====
Species: Siamang (Symphalangus syndactylus) EN/

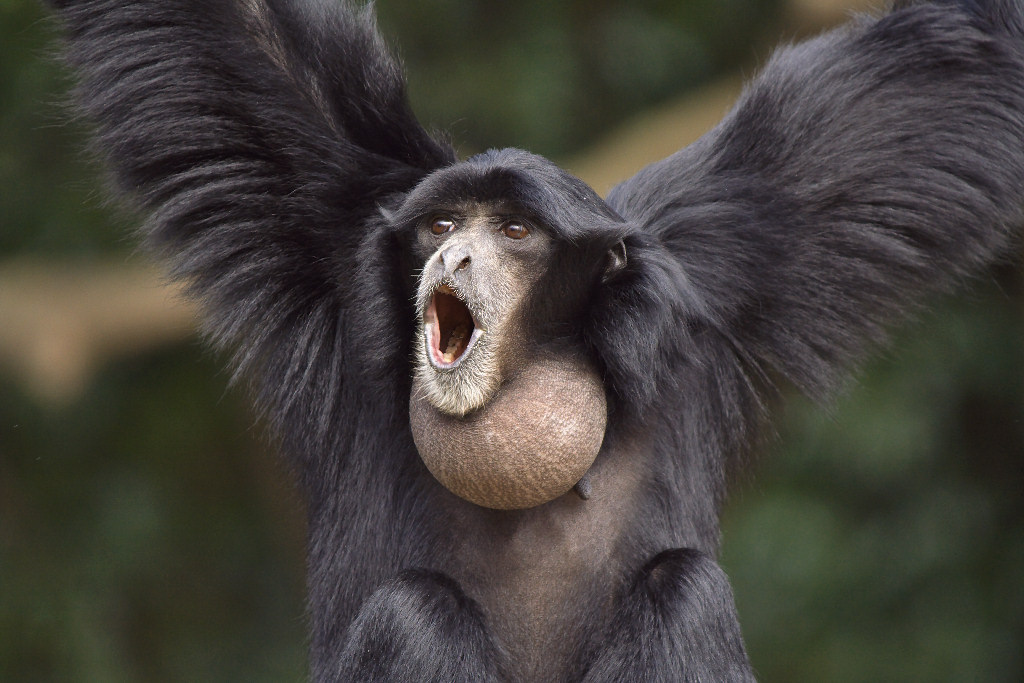

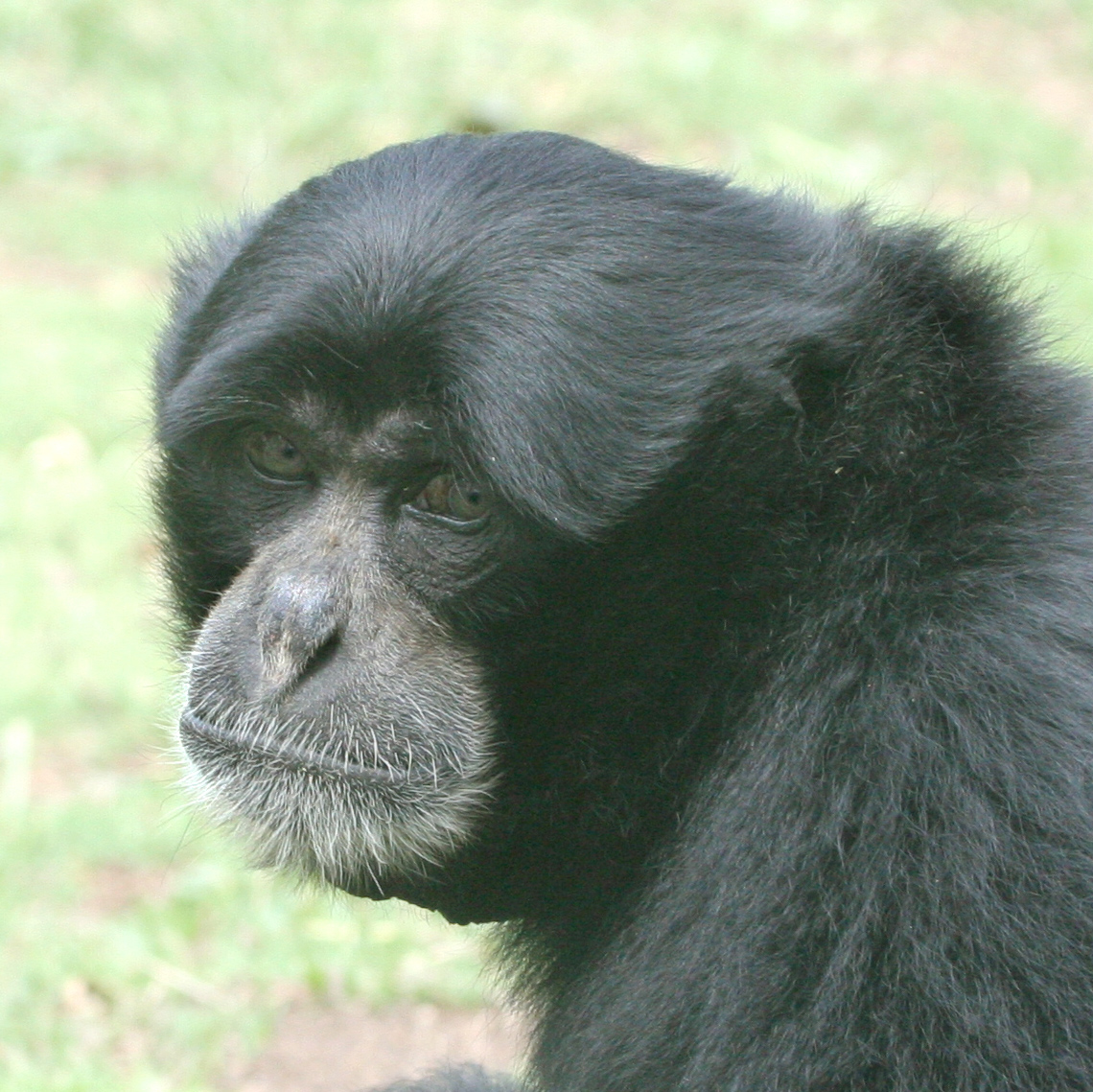

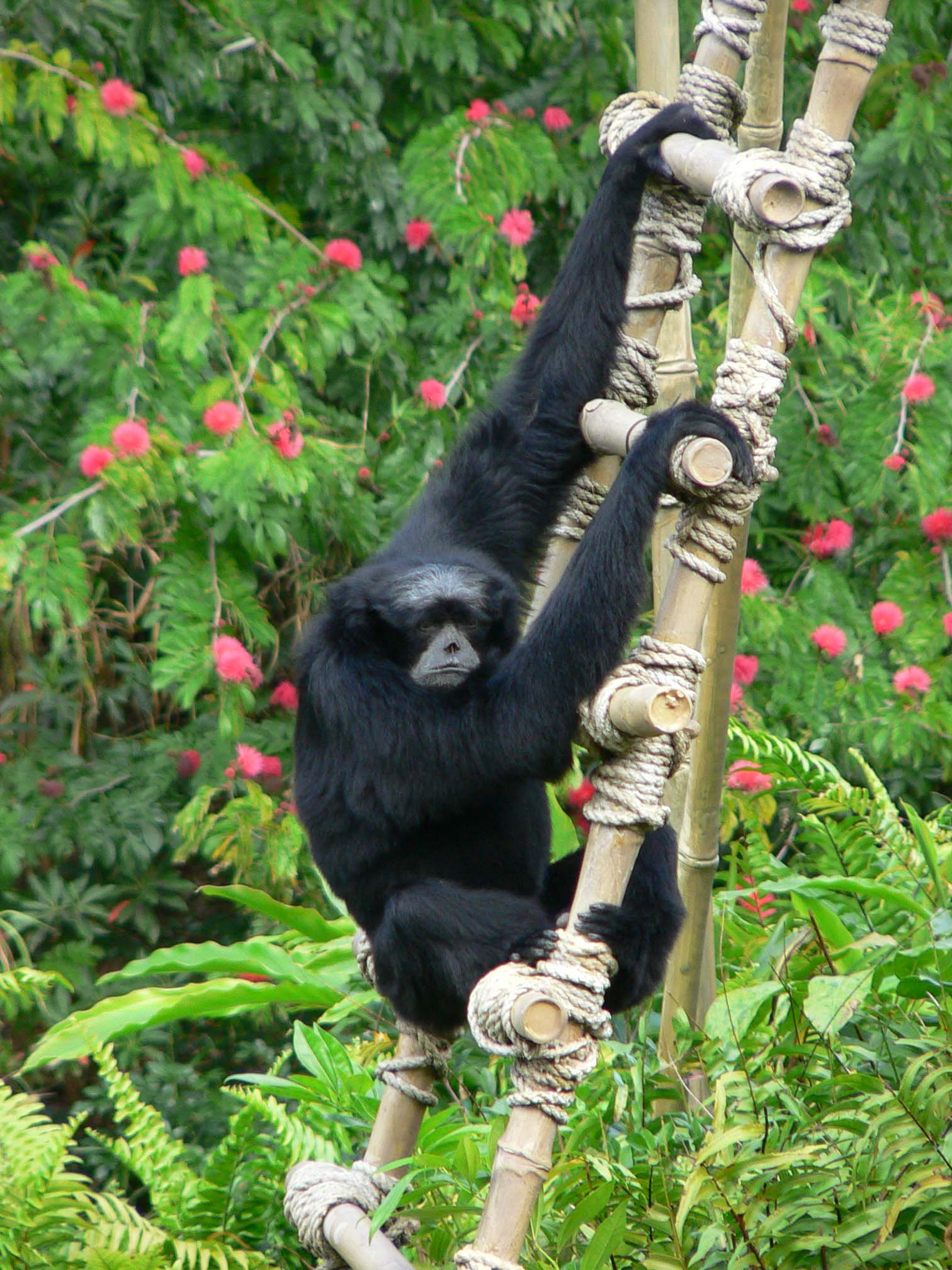

=== Family: Hominidae ===
==== Genus: Pongo ====
Species:

- Sumatran orangutan (Pongo abelii) CR/
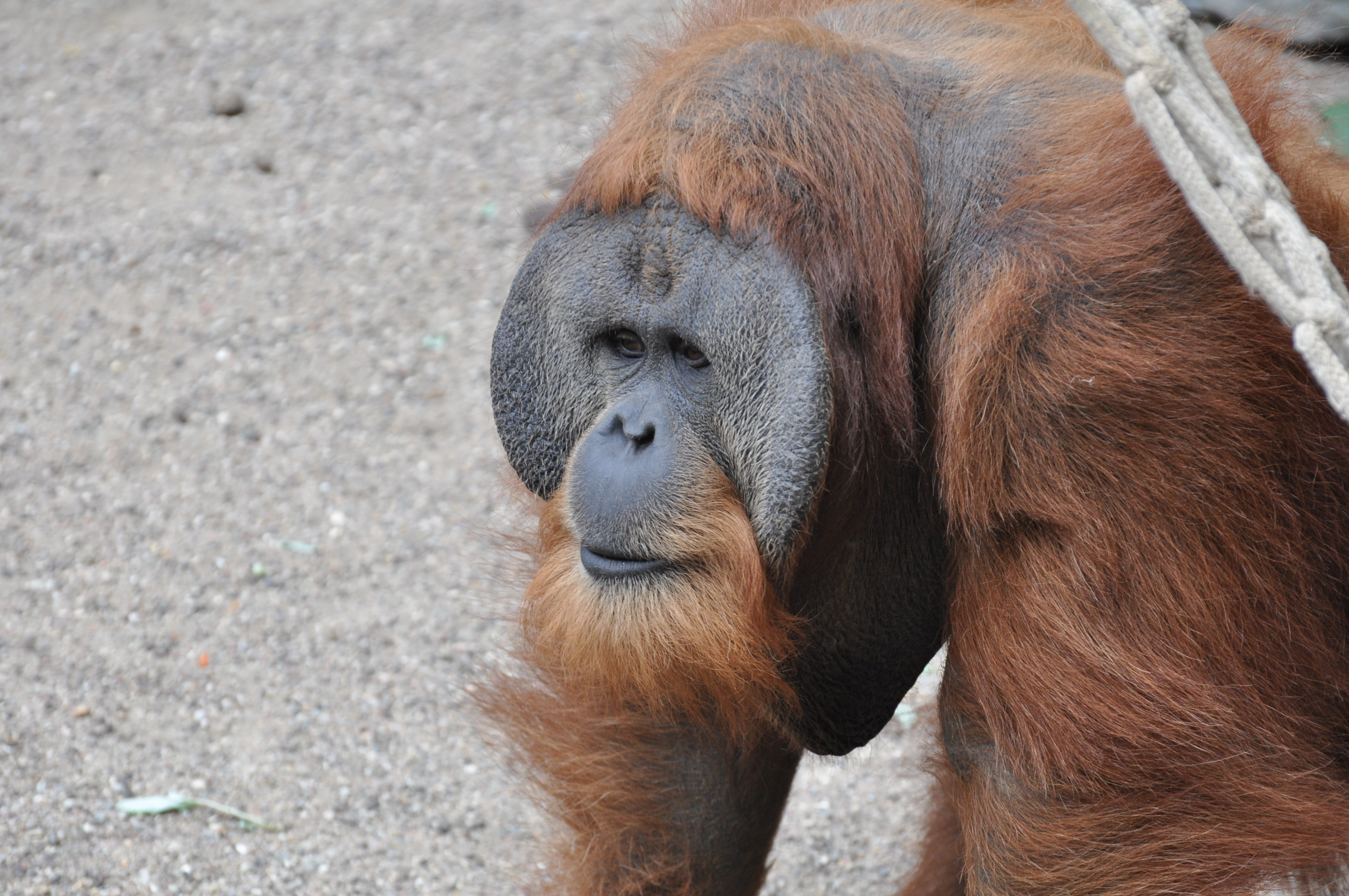

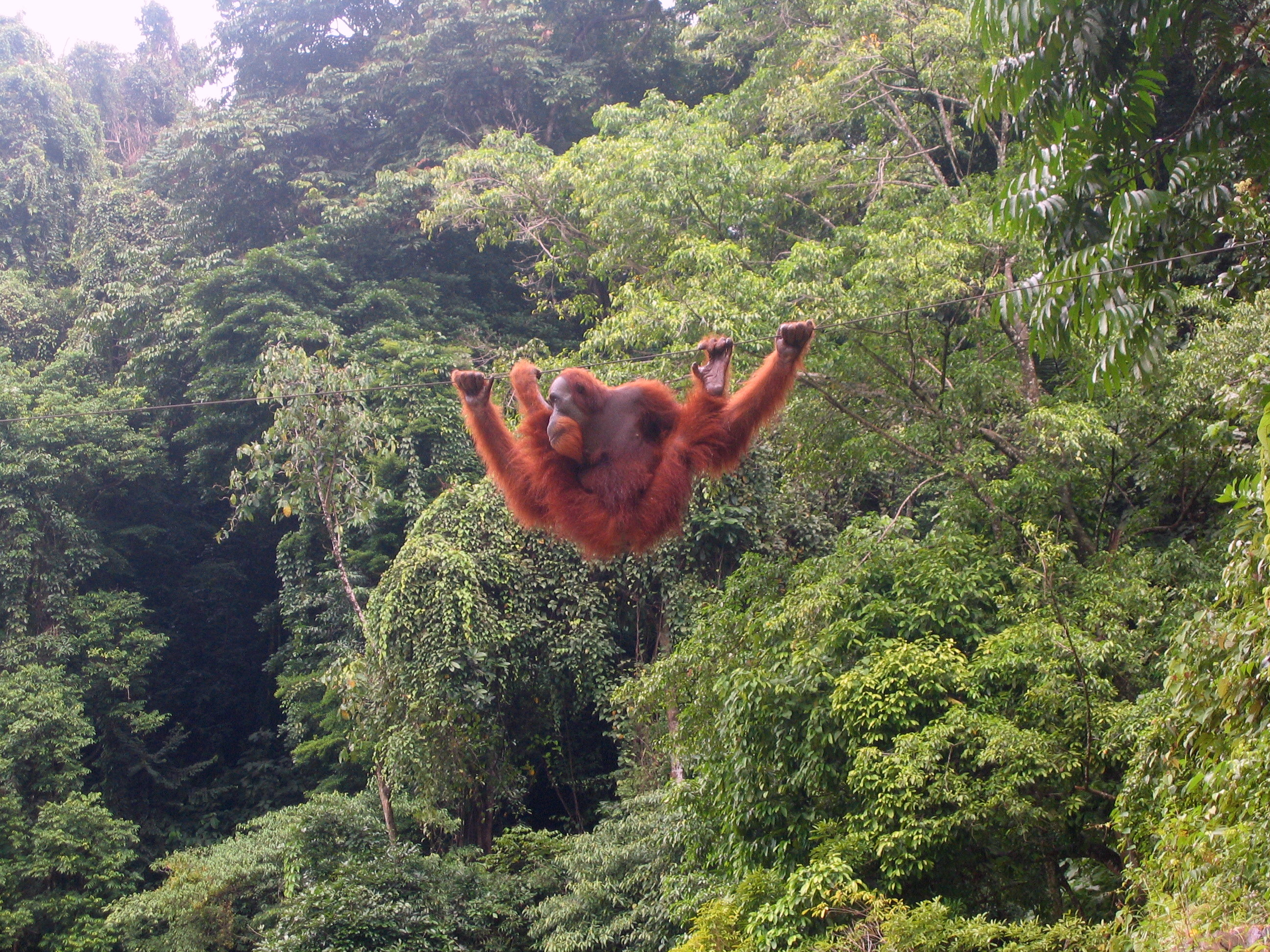

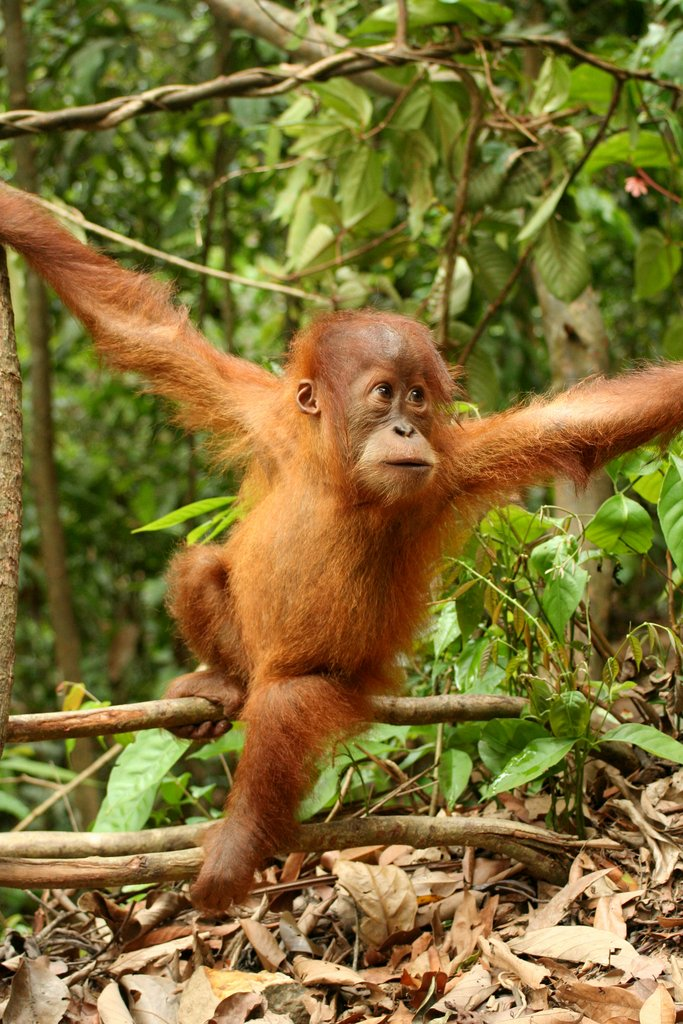
- Tapanuli orangutan (Pongo tapanuliensis) CR/
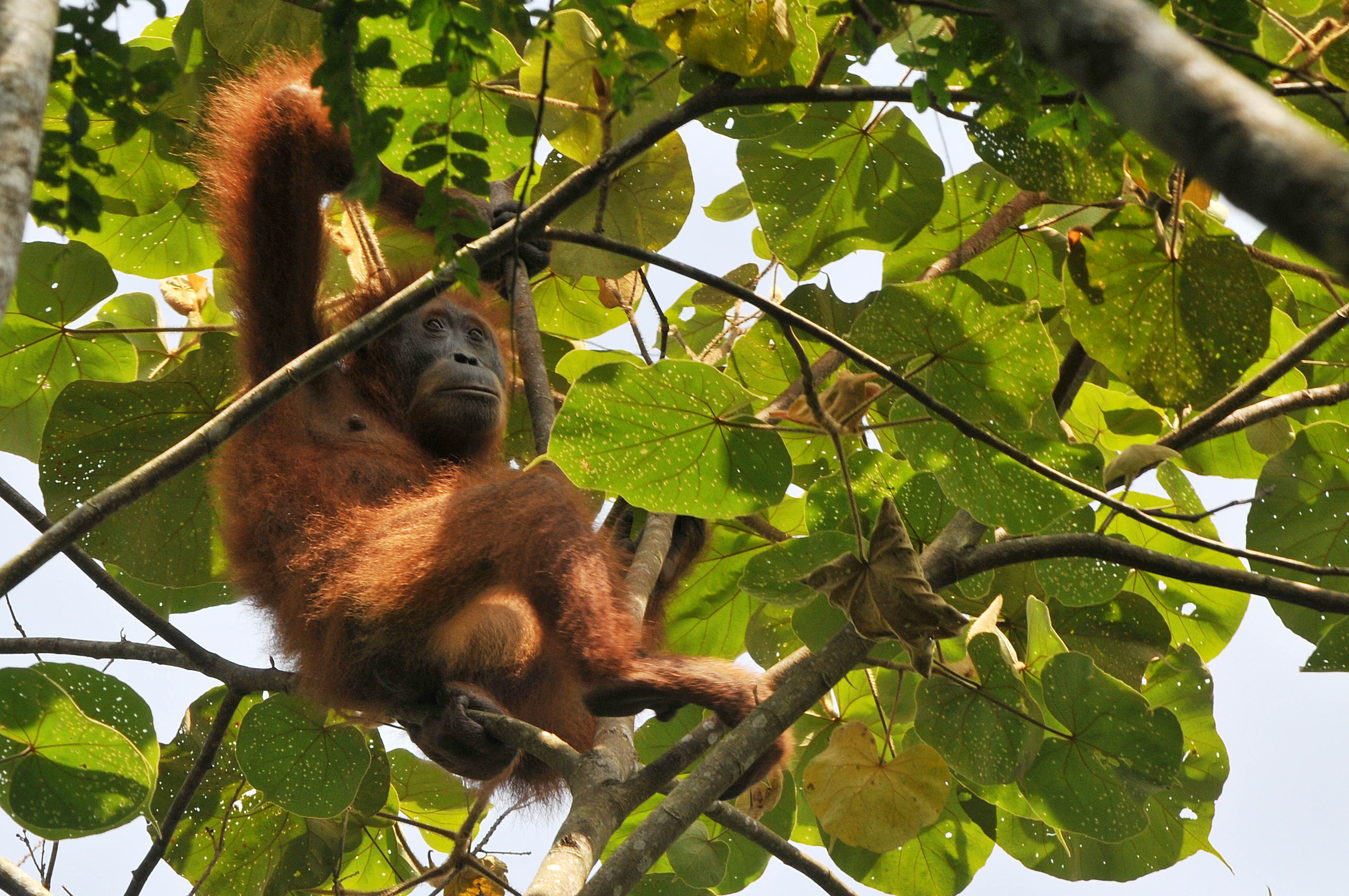

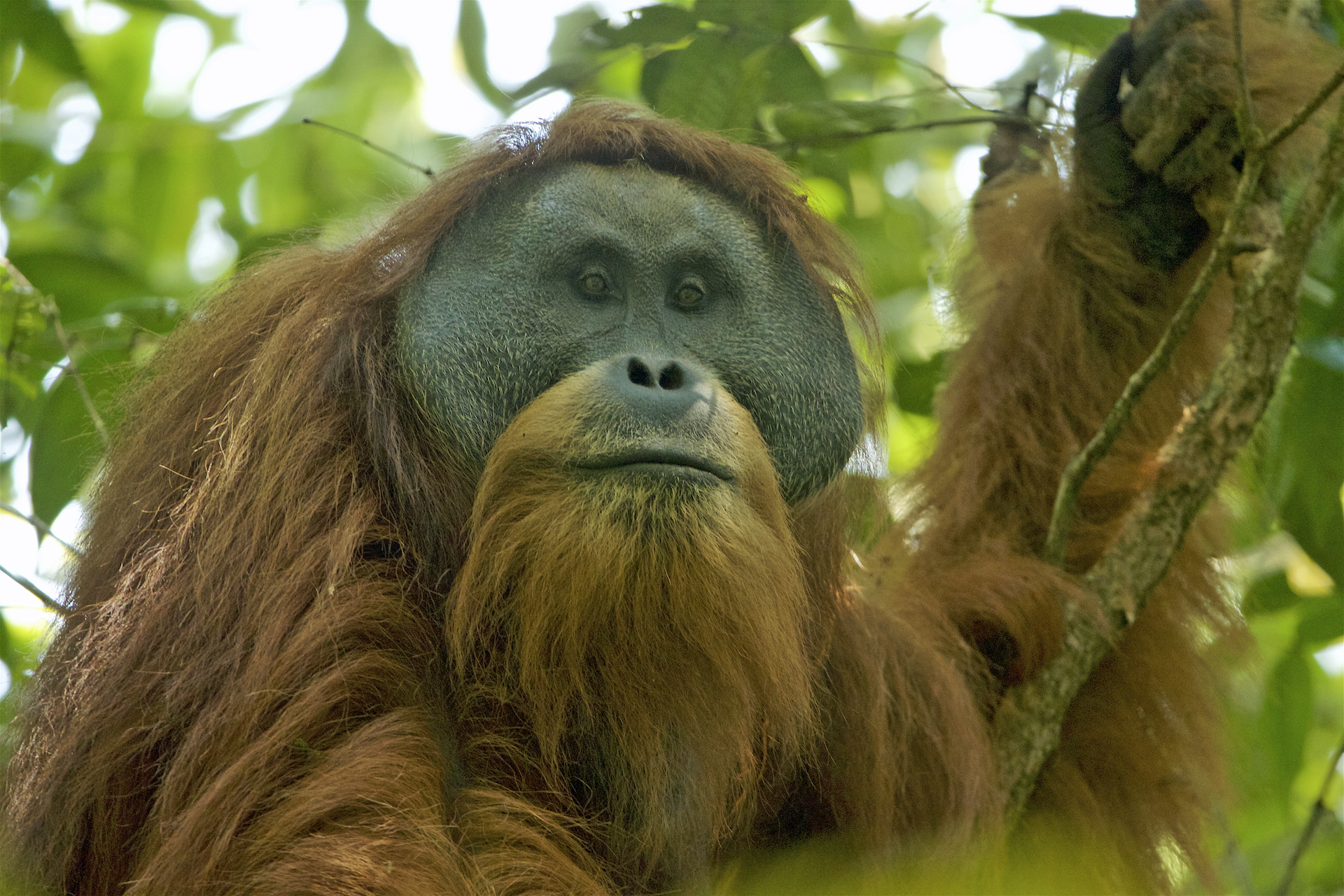

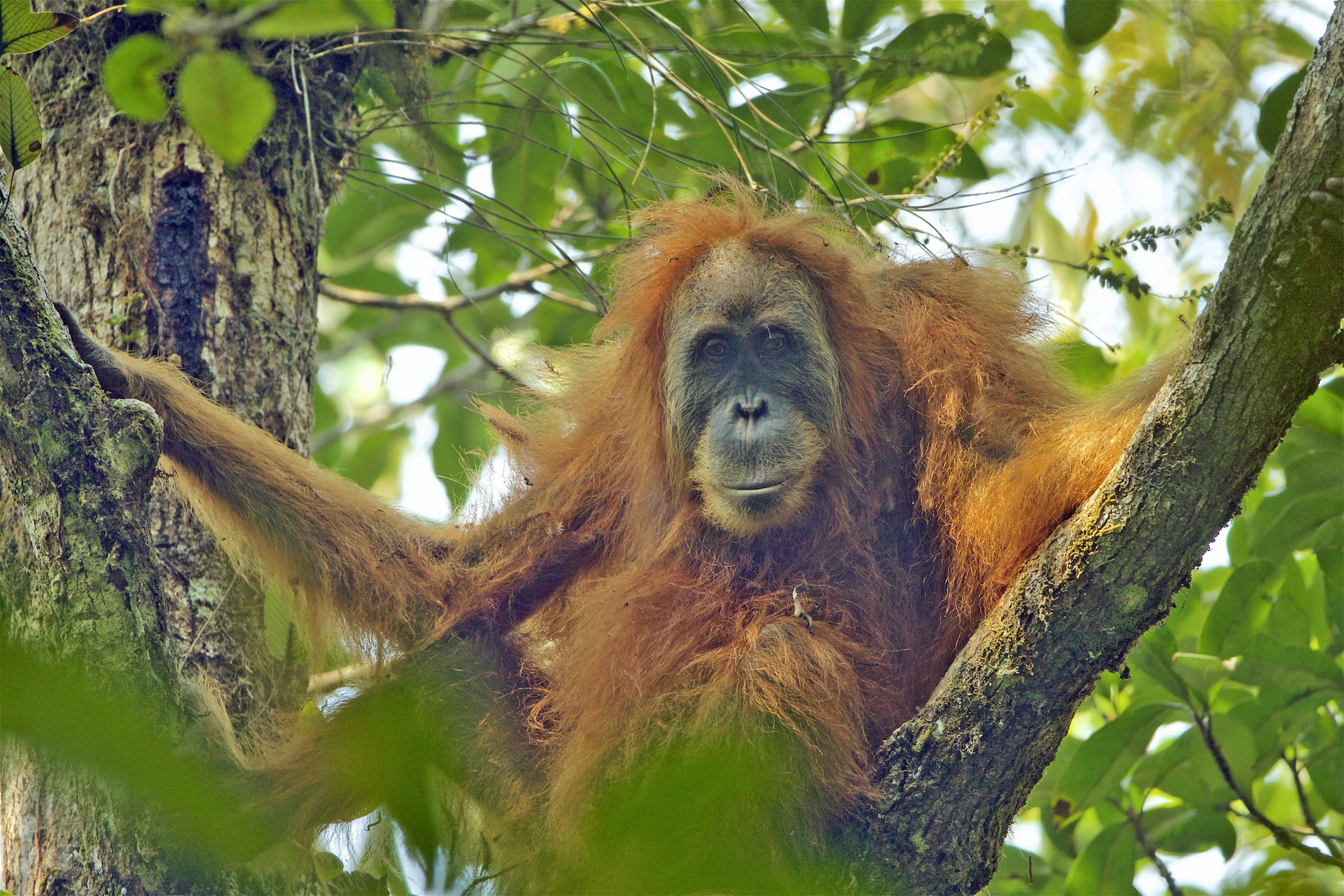
