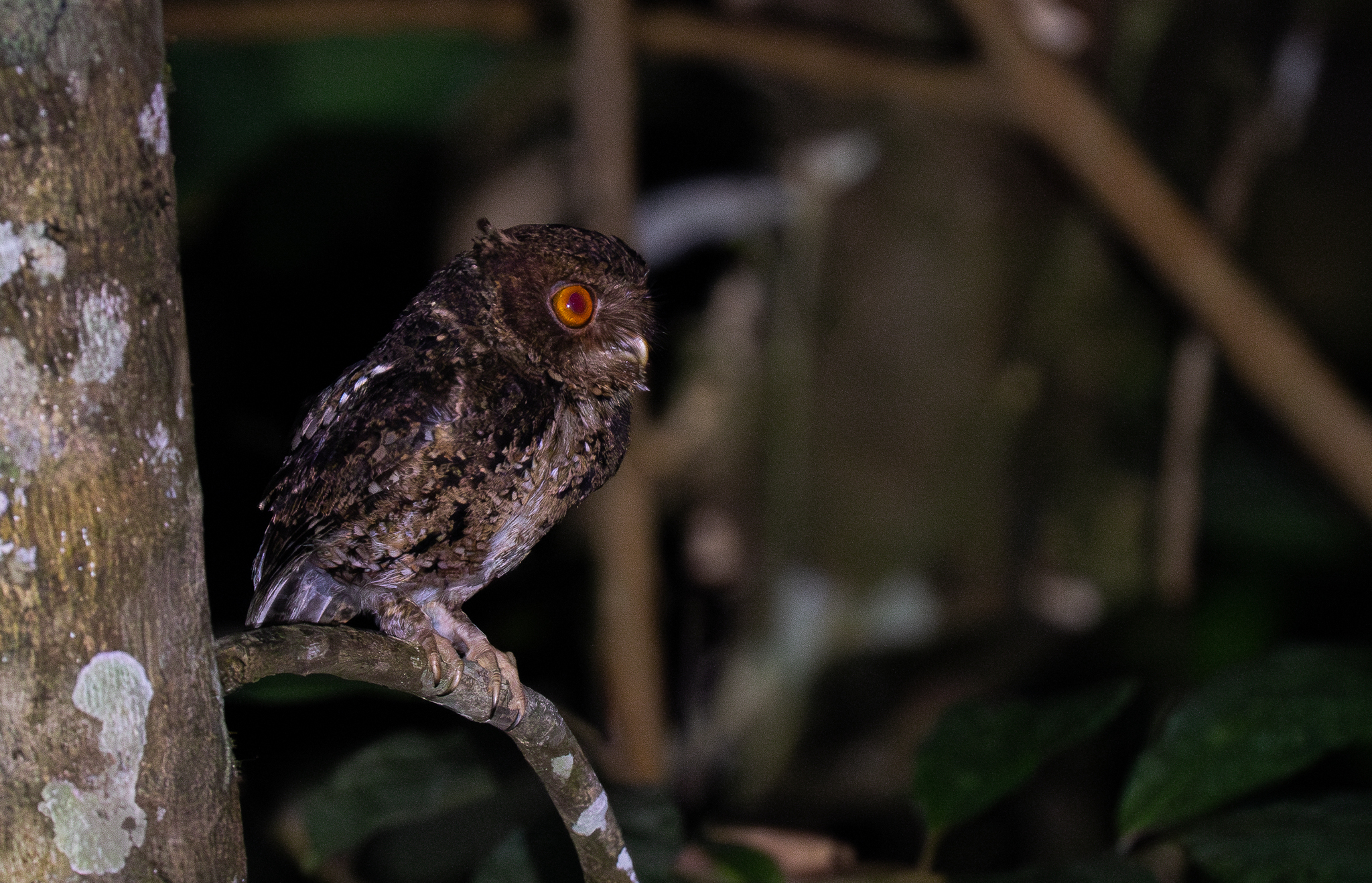

Conservation status
- Near Threatened (IUCN 3.1)
- CITES Appendix II

Scientific classification
- Kingdom: Animalia
- Phylum: Chordata
- Class: Aves
- Order: Strigiformes
- Family: Strigidae
- Genus: Otus
- Species: O. angelinae

Binomial name
- Otus angelinae (Finsch, 1912)

= Javan scops owl =

Species of bird

The Javan scops owl (Otus angelinae) is a small species of owl living mainly on western Java's high volcanos; local people refer to the owl as Celepuk Jawa. Like most owls, this nocturnal bird also has a strong ability of silent flight.

== Identification ==
The average weight of this bird species is 75-90 grams with a body length of 160-180 mm. It has a small tail (63-69 mm) but large wings (135-149 mm) to accommodate its lengthy gliding distance. O. angelinae has a light rusty-brown facial disc and prominent white brows that extend into ear-tufts. Their hooked bill is 19.5-21.5 mm long and varies in colour from dark straw-yellow to light greyish-yellow. The upper part of their body is brown or rufous-brown, generally, with a rusty-buff hindneck-collar, whitish scapular stripe and remiges barred. The underpart of their body is white to pale buff with a pronounced black streak superimposed on light rufous vermiculations. These brown feathers striated with black and white spots help them to better camouflage into the environment. One can distinguish O. angelinae from O. lempiji by noticing their more golden yellow or orange-yellow irides, prominent white eyebrows and ear tufts and tarsal feathering over the base of the toes.

== Systematics ==
Javan scops owl is possibly closest to the O. brookii. Sometimes treated as a subspecies of O. brookii or O. spilocephalus, it is currently defined as a separate species because of differences in morphology and vocal habit.

== Subspecies ==
The Javan scops owl is monotypic.

== Distribution and habitat ==
These birds are endemic to West Java's highland forest. Their traces were discovered in the mountains of Mount Salak, Mount Pangrango, Mount Gede, and Mount Tangkuban Perahu; their appearances were also historically reported in the Papandayan and Ciremai areas.

The Javan scops owl prefers montane forest with a well-developed understory at elevations ranging from 1,500 to 2,000 m. Their documented living elevation ranges from 900 to 2,500 metres. They prefer to dwell in the lower and middle canopy layers with a wider variety of tree species.

== Behaviour and ecology ==
=== Diet and foraging ===
Insects like beetles, grasshoppers, crickets and mantis comprise the main portion of their diet. There have been reports of tiny lizards and snakes being consumed occasionally.

Javan scops owl can deliver beetles (Coleoptera), mantids (Mantodea), stick insect (Phasmatodea), grasshoppers (Tettigoniidae, Orthoptera), and crickets (Gryllidae, Orthoptera) to feed the fledged offspring. In terms of foraging, they use their keen vision and acute hearing to track down their prey and snare it from the trunk, foliage, or the ground.

=== Voice ===
While most scops owls usually make themselves known by their persistent vocalizations, the Javan scops owl is relatively quiet. The bird's alarm calls are repeated explosive "poo-poo" with a 0.5-second delay and a pitch decrease between the two notes. This call will be repeated multiple times and often has a trembling quality. The contact call of these birds is a hissing "tch-tschschsch". The male bird can also produce a lower and softer comfort call like "wook-wook."

=== Breeding ===
Three family units with two newly fledged young were reported in previous literature, one in early February and the other two in early July. Based on these observations, laying is predicted to occur in the second weeks of December and May, respectively, and the clutch size is most likely two eggs.

== Conservation ==
=== Status ===
The Javan scops owl is listed as near threatened on the IUCN Red List. While it is considered rare by most authors, it is somewhat more common in the montane forest above 1,400 m on Mount Salak. Its secretive behaviour and silent habits make the estimation of the bird population very difficult. This species' worldwide population is estimated to be 2,500–9,999 mature individuals, with a declining tendency owing to forest fragmentation.

=== Actions ===
The population has been documented in two protected areas: Mount Halimun Salak National Park and Mount Gede Pangrango National Park. These protected areas encompass around 500 km^{2} (190 sq mi) of woodland with elevations up to 3,000 m (9,800 ft). There are also nature reserves on Mount Tangkuban Prahu and Ijen, where previous Javan scops owl records exist. Proposed future conservation actions on this species include conducting extensive nocturnal research (including mist-netting) on Java's highlands to determine the exact range and population status of O. angelinae, as well as the creation of more protected montane areas.
