= List of faults in Indonesia =

Indonesia is a country located close to tectonic plate boundaries which causes it to have many active faults and is prone to earthquakes,

== Sumatra ==
- Great Sumatran fault
- Samalanga-Sipopok Fault
- Mentawai Fault

== Java ==
- Citarik Fault
- Cimandiri Fault
- Baribis Fault
- Cirata Fault
- Cugenang Fault
- Lembang Fault
- Cileunyi-Tanjungsari Fault
- Southern Garut Fault
- Citanduy Fault
- Kendeng Fault
- Ajibarang Fault
- Merapi-Merbabu Fault
- Opak Fault
- Pati Fault
- Muria Fault
- Rawapening Fault
- Kaligarang Fault
- Rembang-Madura-Kangean-Sakala Fault
- Grindulu Fault

== Borneo ==
- Tarakan Fault
- Meratus Fault
- Adang-Partenoster Fault

== Sulawesi ==
- Palu-Koro Fault
- Matano Fault
- Lawanopo Fault
- Gorontalo Fault
- Kolaka Fault
- Walanae Fault
- Balantak Fault
- Mamuju Thrust Fault
- Saddang Fault

== Lesser Sunda Islands ==
- Flores back-arc thrust fault
- Bondowatu Fault

== Maluku Islands ==
- Banda Detachment
- Sorong Fault
- Kawa Fault

== Papua ==
- Mamberamo Fault
- Main Jayawijaya Thrust Fault
- Lengguru Fault
- Tarera-Aiduna Fault
- Yapen Fault
- Ransiki Fault

== Subduction Zone ==
- Sunda megathrust
- North Sulawesi Trench
- Philippine Trench
- Timor Trough
- Seram Trough
- New Guinea Trench

== See also ==
- List of earthquakes in Indonesia
- Geology of Indonesia
- Indo-Australian plate
- Eurasian plate
- Pacific plate
- Seismicity of the Sumatra coast
