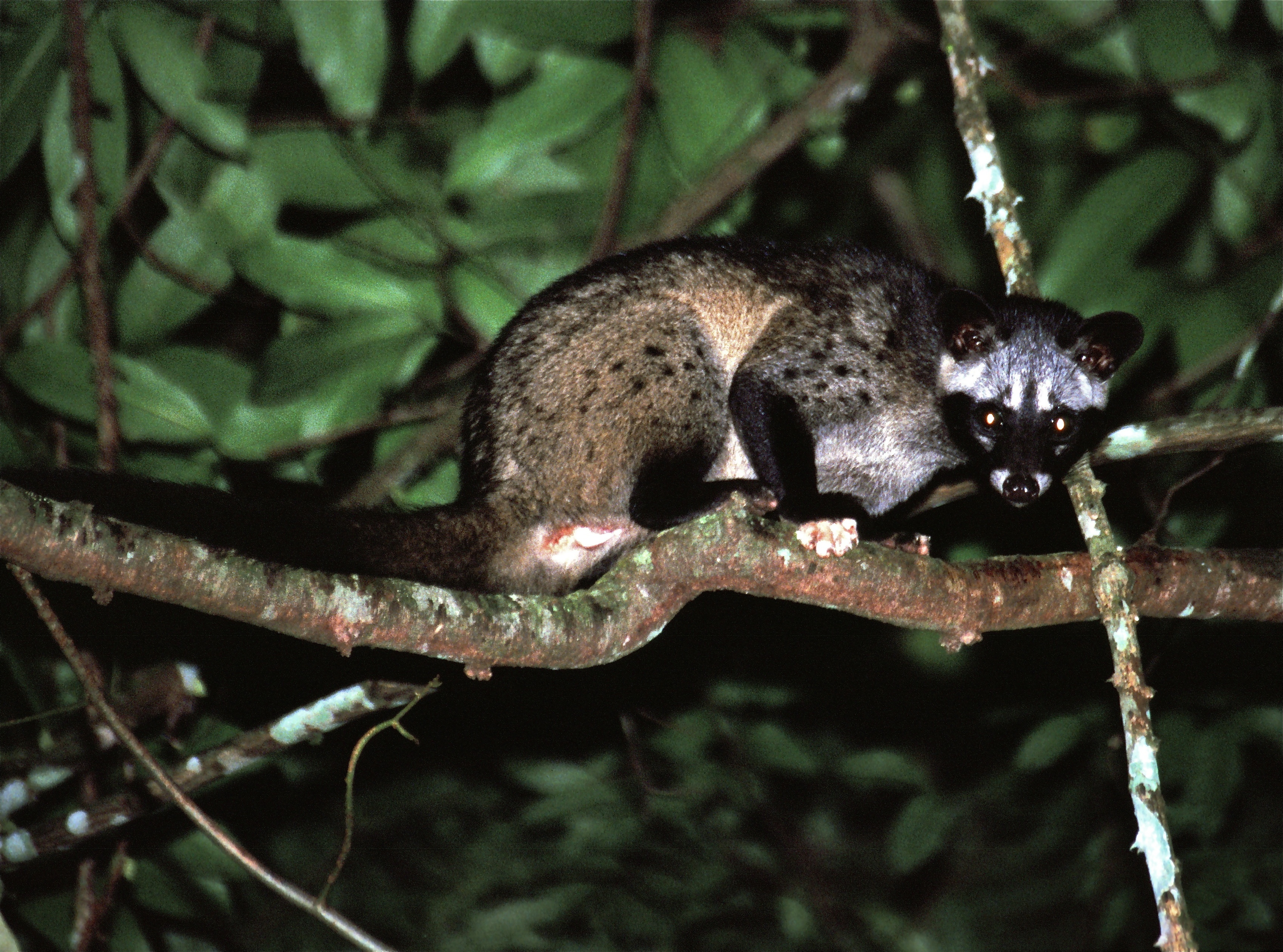
- Asian palm civet in Khao Yai National Park, Thailand

Conservation status
- Least Concern (IUCN 3.1)
- CITES Appendix III

Scientific classification
- Kingdom: Animalia
- Phylum: Chordata
- Class: Mammalia
- Order: Carnivora
- Family: Viverridae
- Genus: Paradoxurus
- Species: P. hermaphroditus

Binomial name
- Paradoxurus hermaphroditus (Pallas, 1777)
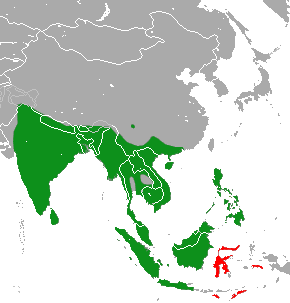
- Asian palm civet range: native in green, introduced in red

= Asian palm civet =

Species of mammal

The Asian palm civet (Paradoxurus hermaphroditus), also called common palm civet, toddy cat and musang, is a viverrid native to South and Southeast Asia. Since 2008, it is IUCN Red Listed as least concern as it accommodates to a broad range of habitats. It is widely distributed with large populations that in 2008 were thought unlikely to be declining. It is threatened by poaching for the illegal wildlife trade.

== Characteristics ==
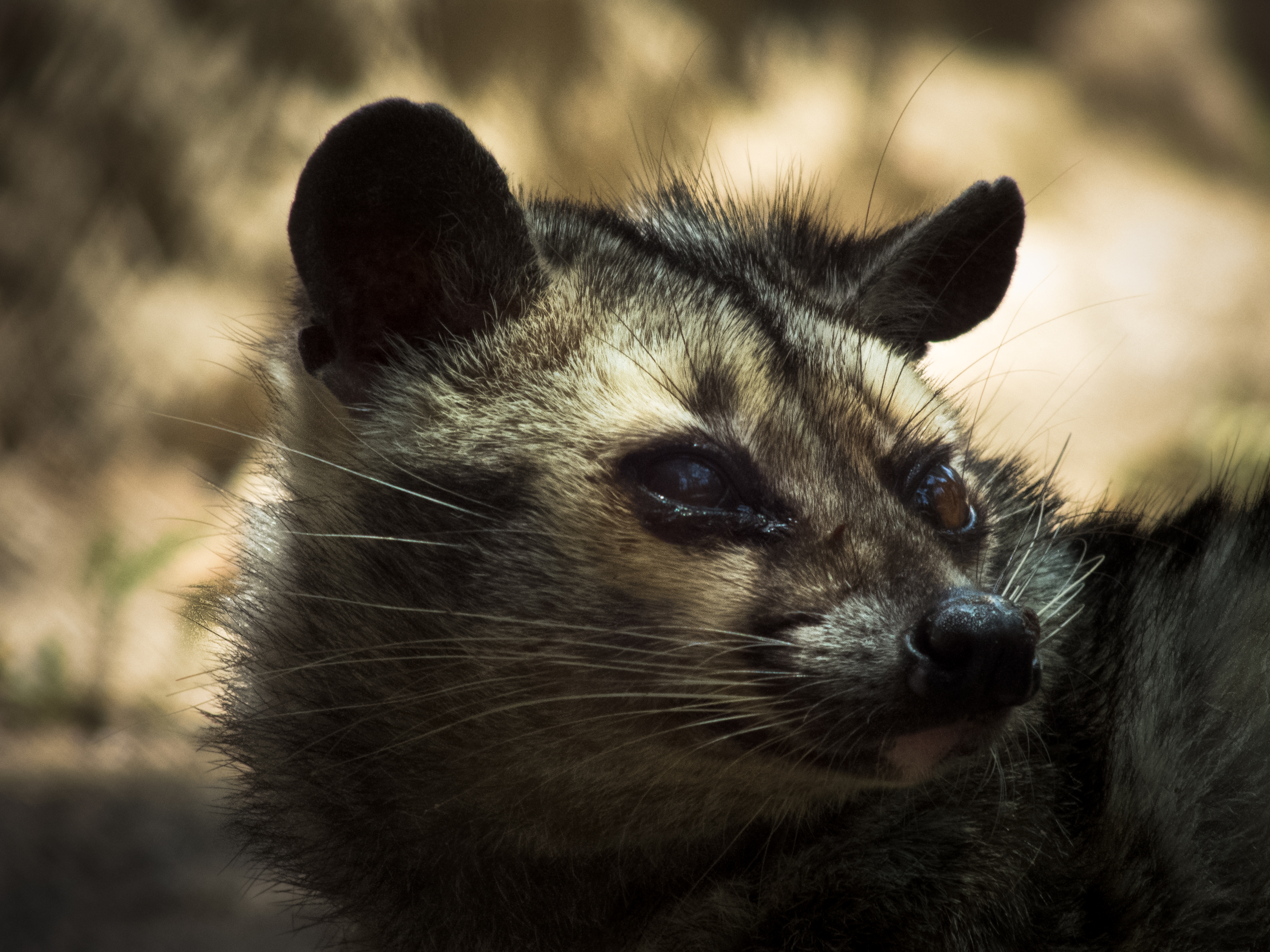
Close up of an Asian palm civet

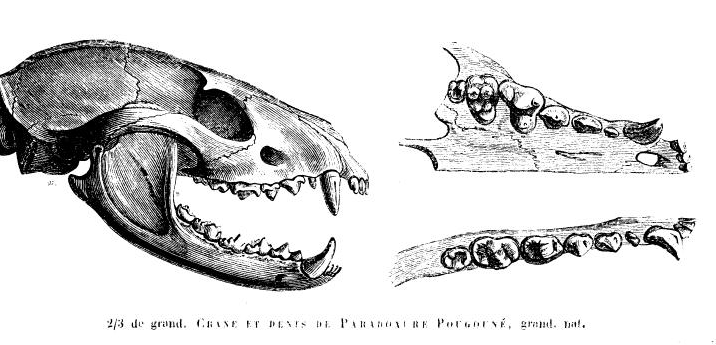
Illustration of skull and dentition, by Gervais in Histoire naturelle des mammifères

The Asian palm civet's long, stocky body is covered with coarse, shaggy hair that is usually greyish in colour. It has a white mask across the forehead, a small white patch under each eye, a white spot on each side of the nostrils, and a narrow dark line between the eyes. The muzzle, ears, lower legs, and distal half of the tail are black, with three rows of black markings on the body. Its head-to-body length is about 53 cm (21 in) with a 48 cm (19 in) long unringed tail. It weighs 2 to 5 kg (4.4 to 11.0 lb). Its anal scent glands emit a nauseating secretion as a chemical defense when threatened or upset.

== Distribution and habitat ==
The Asian palm civet is widely distributed in South and Southeast Asia, ranging from India, Nepal, Bangladesh, Bhutan, Sri Lanka to Myanmar, Thailand, Peninsular Malaysia, Singapore, Laos, Cambodia, Vietnam, China, the Philippines, Borneo and the Indonesian islands of Sumatra, Java, Bawean and Siberut. It usually inhabits primary forests, but also occurs at lower densities in secondary and selectively logged forest.

The Asian palm civet was introduced to Irian Jaya, the Lesser Sunda Islands, Maluku, and Sulawesi. Its presence in Papua New Guinea is uncertain.

== Behaviour and ecology ==
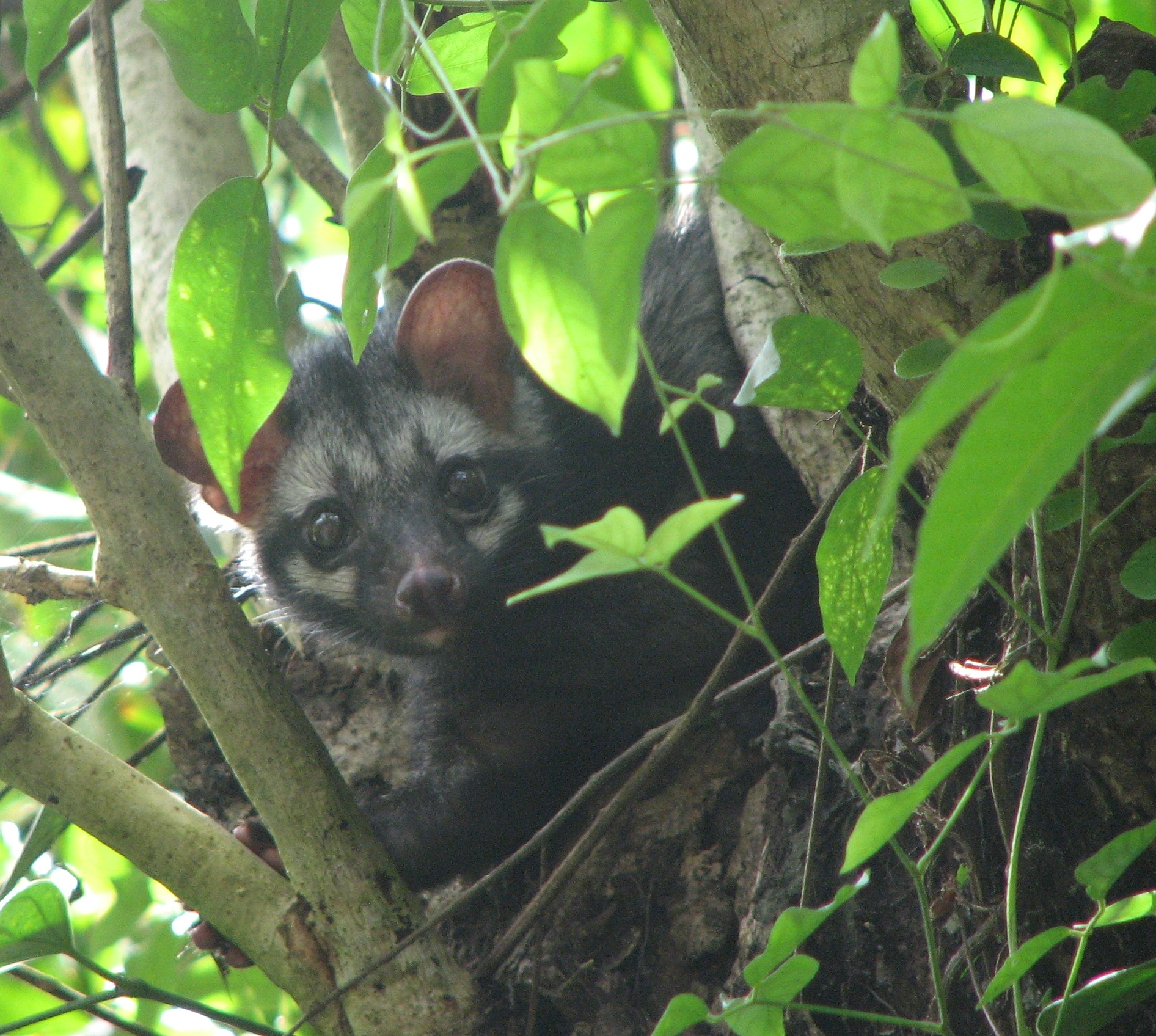
Asian palm civet on a tree at Kerala, India

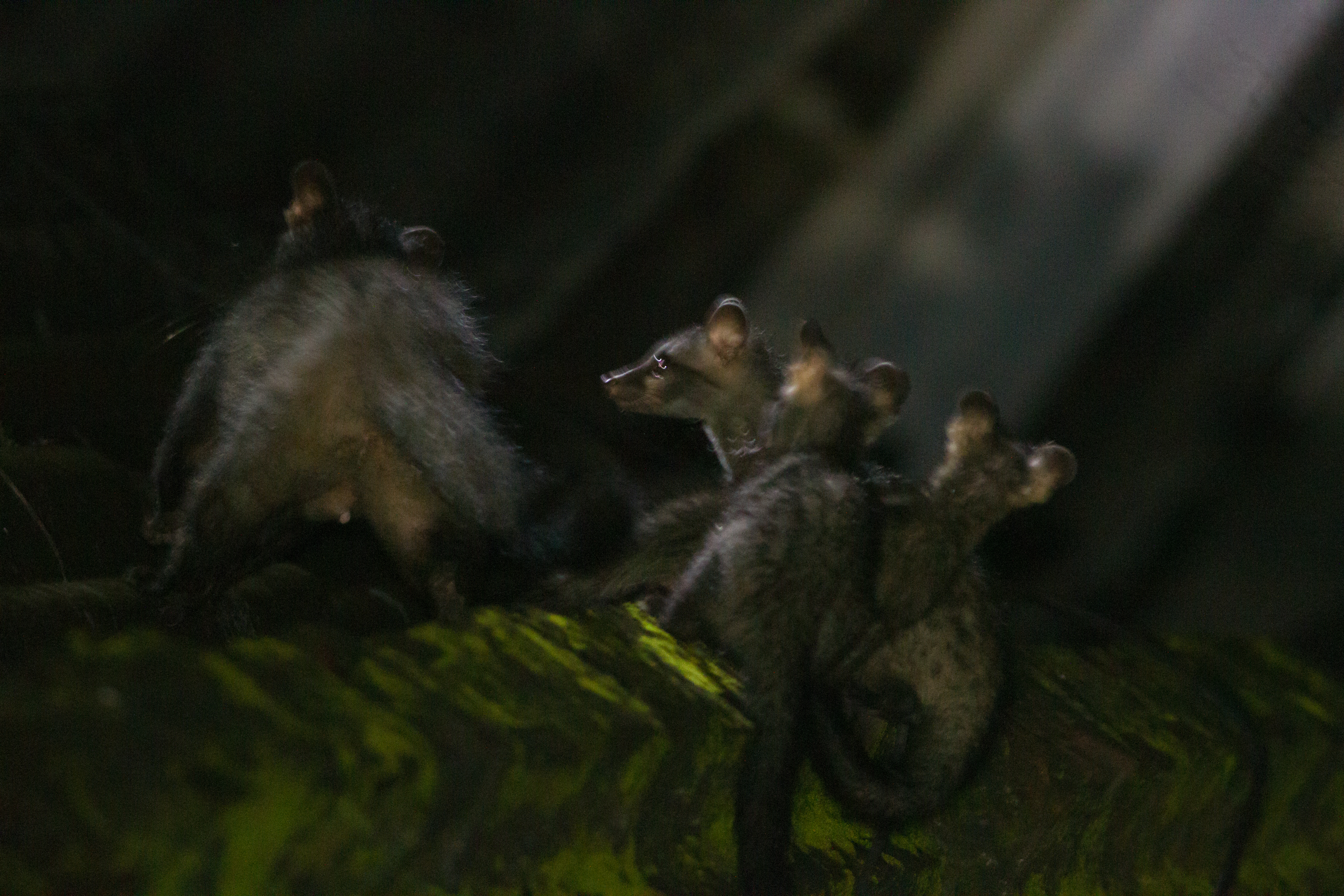
Asian palm civet with pups in an urban area at Baranagar, Kolkata, India

The Asian palm civet is thought to lead a solitary lifestyle, except for brief periods during mating. It is both terrestrial and arboreal, showing a nocturnal activity pattern with peaks between late evening until after midnight. It is usually active between dawn and 4:00 in the morning, but less active during nights when the moon is brightest.

Scent marking behaviour and olfactory response to various excretions such as urine, feces, and secretion of the perineal gland differs in males and females. Scent marking by dragging the perineal gland and leaving the secretion on the substrate was most commonly observed in animals of both sexes. The duration of the olfactory response varied and depended both on the sex and excretion type. The palm civet can distinguish animal species, sex, familiar and unfamiliar individuals by the odor of the perineal gland secretion.

=== Feeding and diet ===
The Asian palm civet is an omnivore feeding foremost on fruits such as berries and pulpy fruits. It thus helps to maintain tropical forest ecosystems via seed dispersal. It eats chiku, mango and rambutan, but also small mammals and insects. It plays an important role in the natural regeneration of Pinanga kuhlii and P. zavana palms at Gunung Gede Pangrango National Park.

=== Reproduction ===
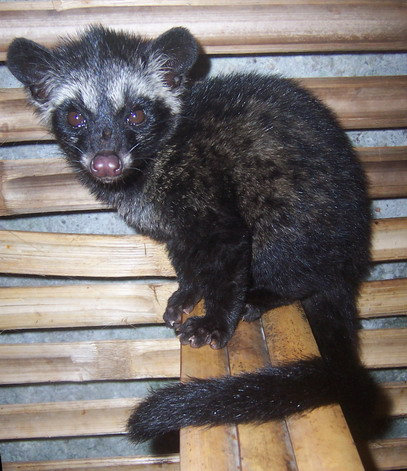
Juvenile Asian palm civet

Due to its solitary and nocturnal habits, little is known about its reproductive processes and behaviour. In March 2010, a pair of palm civets was observed when attempting to mate. The pair copulated on the tree branch for about five minutes. During that period, the male mounted the female 4–5 times. After each mounting, the pair separated for a few moments and repeated the same procedure. After completion of mating, the pair frolicked around for some time, moving from branch to branch on the tree. The animals separated after about six minutes and moved off to different branches and rested there.

== Threats ==
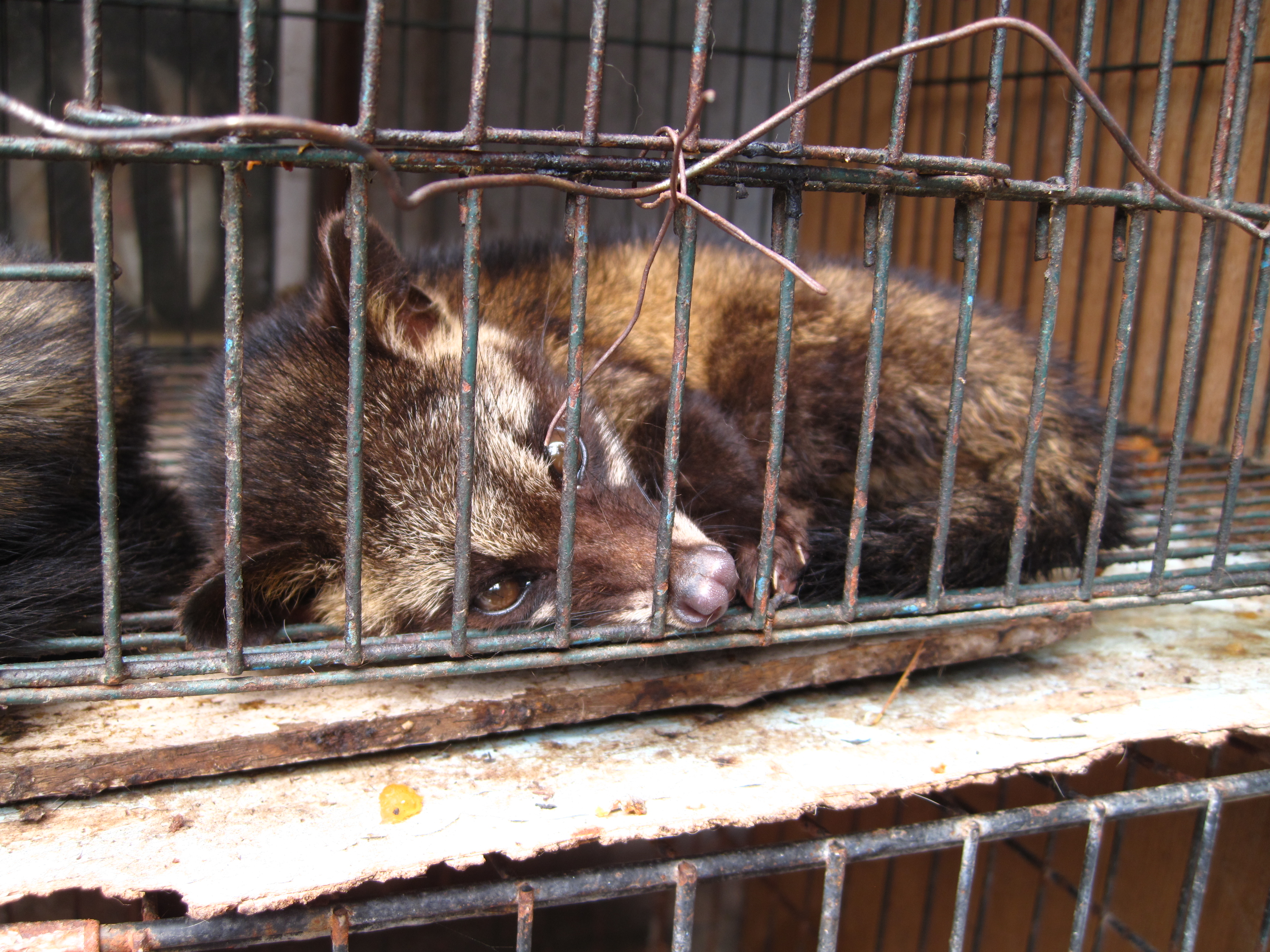
Asian palm civet housed in a cage for the production of kopi luwak

Since 2008, the Asian palm civet is IUCN Red Listed as Least Concern. The global population was thought to be large and unlikely to be declining as of 2008. It is threatened by hunting and trapping, in particular in southern China; in some parts of India, some ethnic tribes kill and consume its meat. The oil extracted from small pieces of the meat, kept in linseed oil in a closed earthen pot and regularly sunned, is used indigenously as a cure for scabies.

In Indonesia, it is threatened by poaching and the illegal wildlife trade; buyers use it for the production of kopi luwak made from coffee beans digested and excreted by Asian palm civets. They are housed in battery cage systems, which have been criticised on animal welfare grounds.

In some parts of its range, Asian palm civets are hunted for bushmeat and the pet trade.

== Conservation ==
The Asian palm civet is listed on CITES Appendix III. There is a quota in place in Indonesia, precluding trade from certain areas, setting a cap on the number of civets that can be taken from the wild, and allowing only 10% of those removed from the wild to be sold domestically. This quota is largely ignored by hunters and traders and is not enforced by authorities. This species has become popular as a pet in Indonesia in recent years, causing a rise in the numbers found in markets in Java and Bali. The majority of the animals sold as pets originate from the wild. The high numbers of animals seen, lack of adherence to the quota and lack of enforcement of the laws are causes for conservation concern.

== Taxonomy and evolution ==
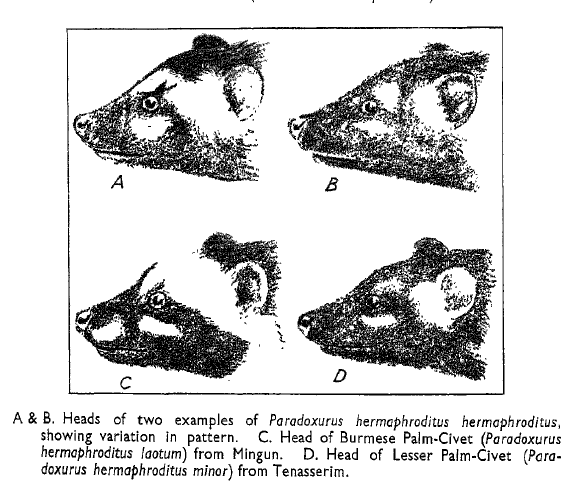
Illustrations of Asian palm civets in Pocock's The fauna of British India, including Ceylon and Burma. Mammalia. – Volume 1

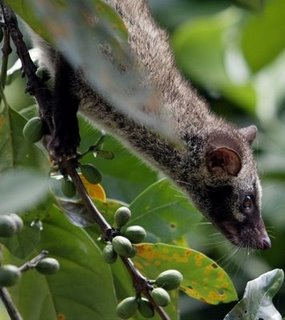
Philippine palm civet

Viverra hermaphrodita was the scientific name proposed by Peter Simon Pallas in 1777. Morphological and molecular studies published in 2015 found that P. hermaphroditus comprised three major clades which are now recognized as distinct species: P. hermaphroditus in the Indian and Indochinese regions, Paradoxurus musangus in mainland Southeast Asia, Sumatra, Java and other small Indonesian islands, and Paradoxurus philippinensis in the Mentawai Islands, Borneo and the Philippines.

=== Evolution ===
Palawan and Borneo specimens are genetically close, so the Asian palm civet on Palawan island might have dispersed from Borneo during the Pleistocene. It is possible that people later introduced Asian palm civet into other Philippines islands.

== In culture ==
In Philippine mythology, the Bagobo people believe a being named Lakivot was said to be a huge and powerful palm civet who can talk. Lakivot defeated various monsters, including the one-eyed monster Ogassi and the busaw beings who guarded the Tree of Gold, which had the Flower of Gold that he sought. He was eventually transformed into a handsome young man, and married the person to whom he gave the Flower of Gold. The Philippine twenty-peso note currently features the Asian palm civet on the reverse side.
