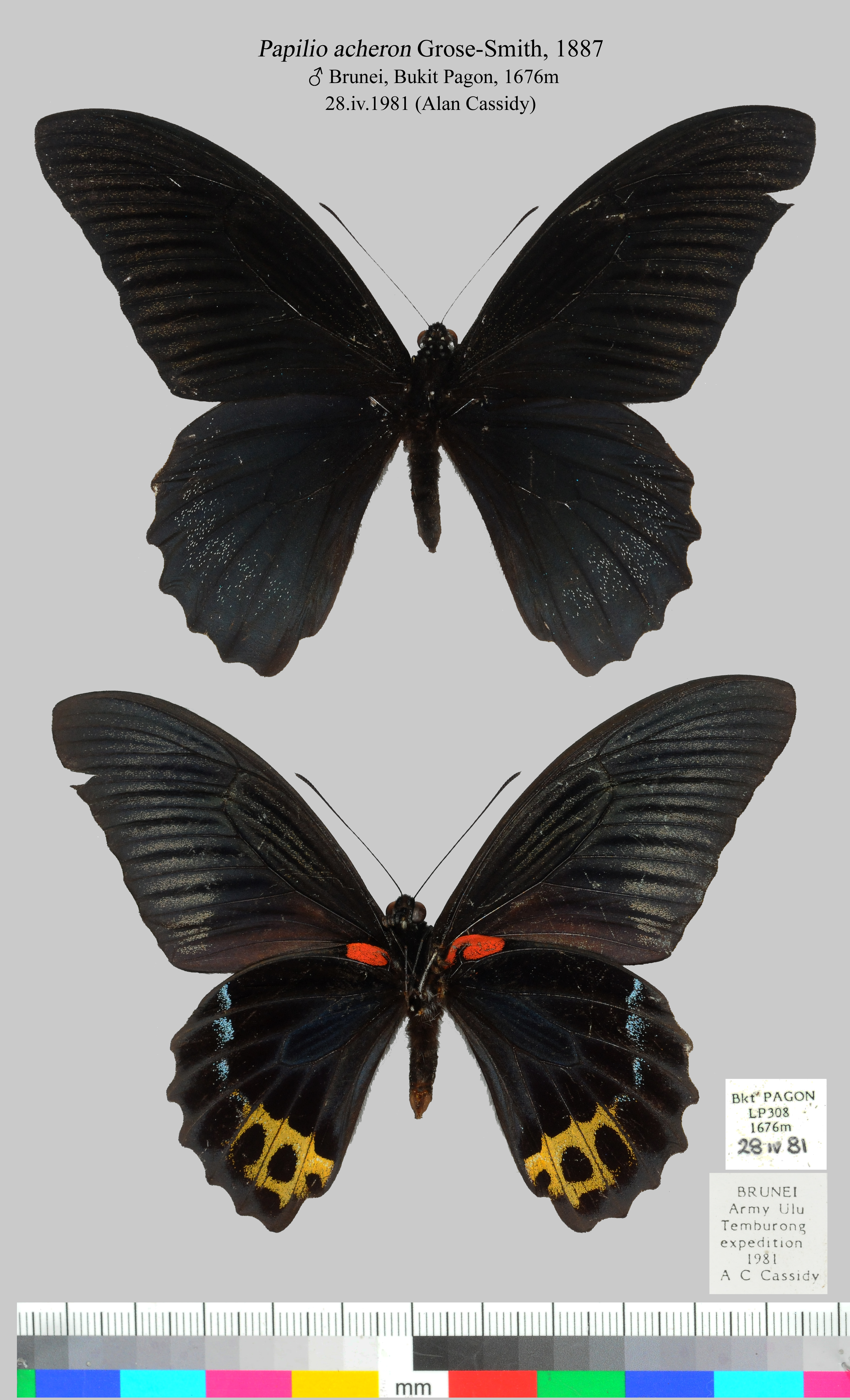
- Papilio acheron male

Conservation status
- Least Concern (IUCN 2.3)

Scientific classification
- Kingdom: Animalia
- Phylum: Arthropoda
- Clade: Pancrustacea
- Class: Insecta
- Order: Lepidoptera
- Family: Papilionidae
- Genus: Papilio
- Species: P. acheron

Binomial name
- Papilio acheron Grose-Smith, 1877

= Papilio acheron =

Species of butterfly

Papilio acheron is a species of butterfly in the family Papilionidae. It is endemic to East Malaysia.

Seitz= P. acheron Gr.-Smith (= goetheanus Fruhst.) (27 a). Very similar to the preceding species [ Papilio forbesi ], the stripes of the forewing much weaker, the red basal spot on the underside of the hindwing larger, the light area in male and female yellow and very much smaller than in forbesi, in the female only very little larger than in the male; he upper surface of the hindwing in male and female without markings except for a row of large, shadowy discal patches consisting of scattered blue-grey scales, the marginal spots very thin. — North Borneo, in the hills (Kina Balu, Mt. Mulu, Mt. Dulit, etc.), the male common.
