= Atrophaneura luchti =

Conservation status
- Endangered (IUCN 3.1)

Scientific classification
- Kingdom: Animalia
- Phylum: Arthropoda
- Class: Insecta
- Order: Lepidoptera
- Family: Papilionidae
- Genus: Atrophaneura
- Species: A. luchti

Binomial name
- Atrophaneura luchti (Gray, 1852) [or possibly (Roepke, 1935)]

Synonyms
- Papilio luchti Gray, 1852

Species of butterfly

Atrophaneura luchti is a species of butterfly in the family Papilionidae. It is endemic to Indonesia (Java).

Atrophaneura luchti is restricted to the mountains in the far east of Java. Little is known about this species which closely resembles and may be a synonym of Atrophaneura priapus.

Atrophaneura luchti is a large butterfly. The forewing measures between 60 and 65 mm in length. The female is on average larger than the male. The underside and upperside are identical. The forewings are dark gray with black veins and are lighter around the veins. The hindwings are serrated and tailless. They are black with a broad white or cream band marked with black spots in the postdiscal and submarginal parts. The body is black, while the head and the sides of the thorax and abdomen are pink or red
