= Peperomia pangerangoana =

Scientific classification
- Kingdom: Plantae
- Clade: Tracheophytes
- Clade: Angiosperms
- Clade: Magnoliids
- Order: Piperales
- Family: Piperaceae
- Genus: Peperomia
- Species: P. pangerangoana

Binomial name
- Peperomia pangerangoana C. DC.

Species of epiphyte

Peperomia pangerangoana is a species of epiphyte in the genus Peperomia that is native to Java. It grows on wet tropical biomes. Its conservation status is Threatened.

== Description ==
The type specimen were collected on Mount Pangerango, Java.

Peperomia pangerangoana is a glabrous plant growing on mossy tree trunks, with a stem rooting at the base, hard and black when dry, 2 mm thick, angular, branched above; branchlets ribbed, 1 mm thick. The leaves are alternate with short petioles 3 mm long; the upper blade is elliptic or elliptic-lanceolate, acute at the base, obtuse at the apex; subsequent leaves are obovate from a cuneate base; all leaves are rigid when dry, minutely red-punctulate beneath, up to 19 mm long and 9–14 mm wide, 3-nerved. The peduncles are axillary and terminal, up to 10 mm long, slightly longer than the leaf blade. The spikes are sublaxly flowered, up to 22 mm long and 0.75 mm thick, rigid when dry. The bract has a sub-obovate-round pelt, shortly pedicellate at the center, 0.75 mm long and up to 0.5 mm wide. The ovary is ovate, immersed in the rachis at the base, sprinkled with glands, bearing a stigma obliquely just below the apex; the stigma is fleshy. The berry is ovate, somewhat roughened with glands, nearly 1 mm long.

== Taxonomy and naming ==
It was described in 1920 by Casimir de Candolle in the Annuaire du Conservatoire et du Jardin botaniques de Genève, from specimens collected by Wilhelm Sulpiz Kurz. It was named for Mount Pangerango in Java, where the type specimen was collected.

== Distribution and habitat ==
It is native to Java. It grows as a epiphyte and is a herb. It grows on wet tropical biomes.

== Conservation ==
This species is assessed as Threatened, in a preliminary report.
