= 2012 Sulawesi earthquake =

Earthquake in Indonesia

- Location within Sulawesi Location within Indonesia
- UTC time: 2012-08-18 09:41:52
- USGS-ANSS: ComCat
- Local date: 18 August 2012
- Local time: 17:41:52 WITA (UTC+8)
- Magnitude: 6.3 M_{w}
- Depth: 10 km (6 mi)
- Epicenter: 1.315°S 120.096°E
- Areas affected: Sulawesi, Indonesia
- Max. intensity: MMI VIII (Severe)
- Landslides: Yes
- Casualties: 6 fatalities, 43 injuries

On 18 August 2012, at 17:41:52 WITA (09:41:52 UTC), a M_{w} 6.3 earthquake struck Sigi Regency in Central Sulawesi, Indonesia, 51 km (32 mi) south-southeast of Palu.

== Tectonic setting ==
Sulawesi lies within the complex zone of interaction between the Australian, Pacific, Philippine and Sunda plates in which many small microplates are developed. The main active structure onshore in the western part of Central Sulawesi is the left-lateral NNW-SSE Palu-Koro strike-slip fault that forms the boundary between the North Sula and Makassar blocks.

== Earthquake ==
The United States Geological Survey reported a magnitude (M_{ww}) of 6.3, at a depth of 10 km (6.2 mi) and a maximum Modified Mercalli intensity of VIII (Severe).

== Impact ==
Six people were killed by falling debris and tons of mud, including a nine-year-old boy. 43 others were injured, including 8 in critical condition. 471 homes were destroyed and 1,097 damaged in the epicentral area. Landslides also blocked roads and some bridges.
