= Papilio lampsacus =

Conservation status
- Endangered (IUCN 3.1)

Scientific classification
- Kingdom: Animalia
- Phylum: Arthropoda
- Clade: Pancrustacea
- Class: Insecta
- Order: Lepidoptera
- Family: Papilionidae
- Genus: Papilio
- Species: P. lampsacus

Binomial name
- Papilio lampsacus Boisduval, 1836

Species of butterfly

Papilio lampsacus is a species of swallowtail butterfly from the genus Papilio that is found in west Java, Indonesia where it is only known from the localities of Mt. Gede and Mt Mas.In 1982 it was apparently rather scarce although said to be abundant on Mt Gede.

It is now very rare, and there are few recently confirmed sightings. The last sighting is a picture taken in March 2014.

P. lampsacus is a member of the species group: memnon Jordan describes it P. lampsacus Bdv. (26 b). Two longitudinal lines beneath at each side of the abdomen and a broad discal band on the hindwing, produced at the veins to the distal margin, white-yellow, the anal spot of the band and a narrow basal central streak on the under surface of the hindwing deeper yellow. The female paler than the male, with white-yellow basal patch on the upperside of the forewing. — Java: in the mountains, at 1500–4000 ft. elevation. A mimic of the Aristolochia Papilio P. priapus.
