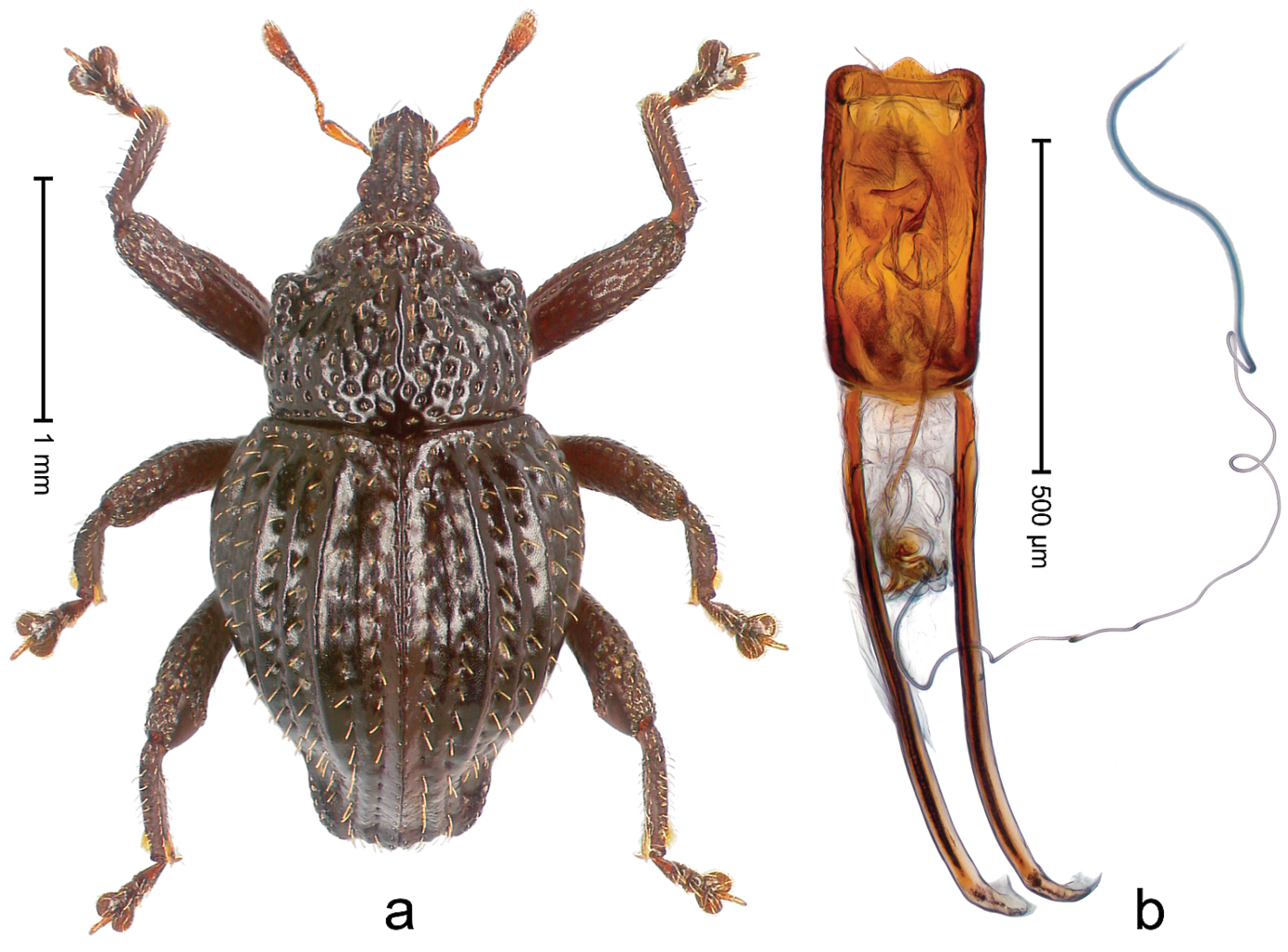

Scientific classification
- Kingdom: Animalia
- Phylum: Arthropoda
- Clade: Pancrustacea
- Class: Insecta
- Order: Coleoptera
- Suborder: Polyphaga
- Infraorder: Cucujiformia
- Family: Curculionidae
- Genus: Trigonopterus
- Species: T. angulicollis

Binomial name
- Trigonopterus angulicollis Riedel, 2014

= Trigonopterus angulicollis =

Species of beetle

Trigonopterus angulicollis is a species of flightless weevil in the genus Trigonopterus from Indonesia. The species was described in 2014 and is named after the angular appearance of its pronotum. The beetle is 2.45–2.58 mm long. It has a reddish-brown head and legs, while the rest of the body is black. Endemic to West Java, where it is known from Mount Gede at elevations of 1,281–1,342 m (4,203–4,403 ft).

== Taxonomy ==
Trigonopterus angulicollis was described by the entomologist Alexander Riedel in 2014 on the basis of an adult male specimen collected from Mount Gede on the island of Java in Indonesia. The specific epithet is derived from the Latin angularis, meaning "angular", and collum, meaning "neck", or "pronotum".

== Description ==
The beetle is 2.45–2.58 mm long. It has a reddish-brown head and legs, with the rest of the body being black. The body is subhexagonal in shape, with a pronounced narrowing between the pronotum and elytron both dorsally and in profile. The rostrum has a central ridge and two submedian ridges, with the grooves between them punctured; each puncture bears a long, erect scale. The epistome has a transverse, angled ridge that forms a central denticle.

The pronotum projects sharply at the front sides and narrows clearly before the apex. Its surface is rough and punctured, with each puncture bearing a slender scale that is semi-erect to semi-flat. A central ridge runs along the middle. The elytra have deeply impressed striae, each lined with stout, suberect bristles. The intervals are raised to sharply ridged, nearly bare, with interval 3 being the most prominent. Interval 7 is swollen near the tip and projects slightly outward. The femora are edentate. The metafemur has a stridulatory patch near the tip and transverse rows of small teeth. The fifth abdominal segment is swollen, with a shallow central depression and sparse setae.

The penis has nearly parallel sides and a pointed tip in the center. The internal sclerites are asymmetrical. The transfer apparatus is flagelliform and approximately twice the length of the penis body. The apodemes are 2.0 times as long, and the ductus ejaculatorius lacks a bulbus.

In females, the rostrum has pairs of lateral and submedian grooves on the upper surface, and the epistome is simple. The fifth abdominal segment in females is flat, with a prominent central tooth visible in profile.

== Distribution ==
Trigonopterus angulicollis is endemic to the Indonesian province of West Java, where it is known from near Sukabumi on Mount Gede. It has been recorded at elevations of 1,281–1,342 m (4,203–4,403 ft).
