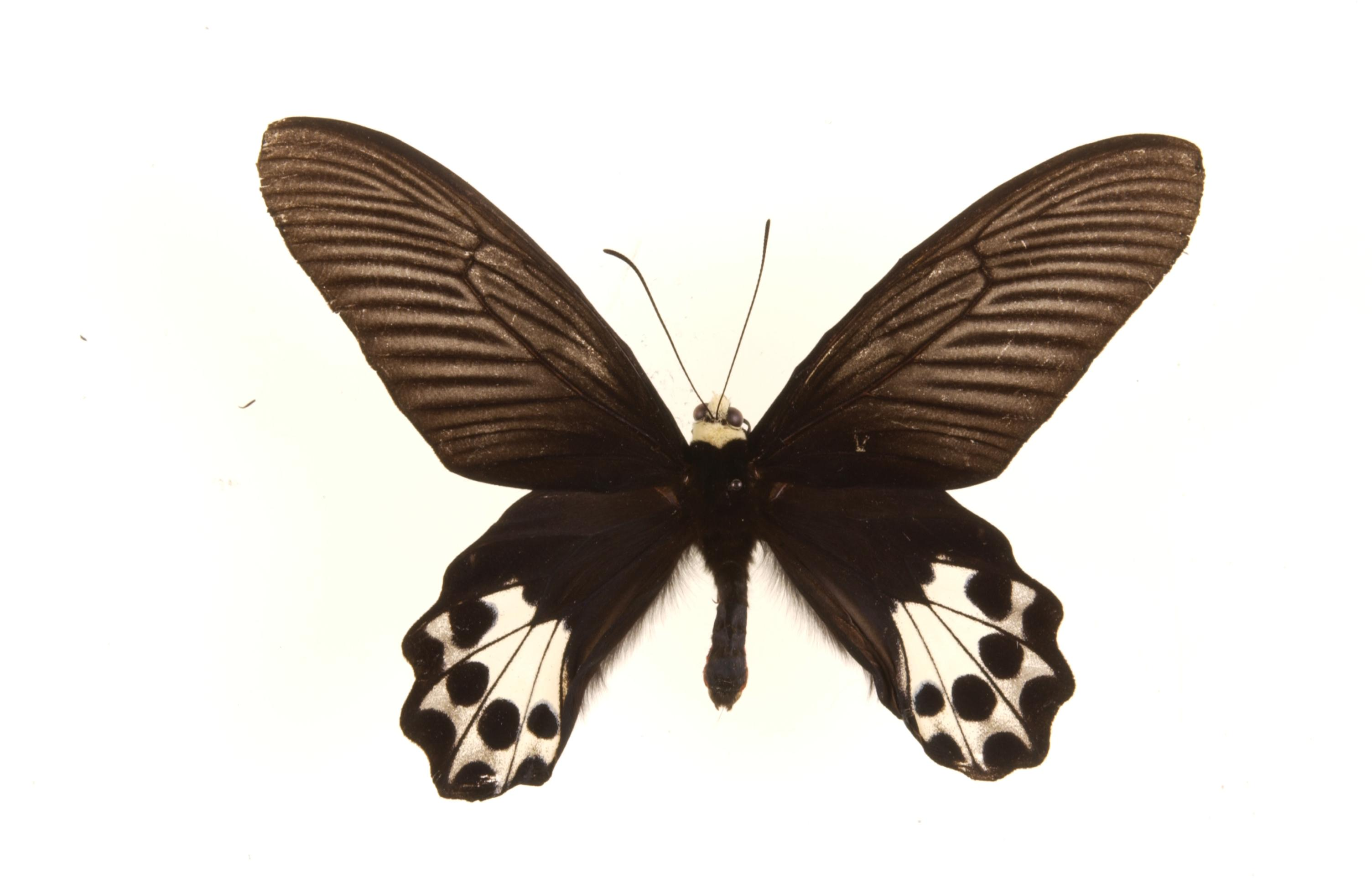
- Atrophaneura priapus hageni

Scientific classification
- Kingdom: Animalia
- Phylum: Arthropoda
- Clade: Pancrustacea
- Class: Insecta
- Order: Lepidoptera
- Family: Papilionidae
- Genus: Atrophaneura
- Species: A. priapus

Binomial name
- Atrophaneura priapus (Boisduval, 1836)

Synonyms
- Papilio priapus Boisduval, 1836; Papilio dilutus Fruhstorfer, 1895; Papilio hageni Rogenhofer, 1889

= Atrophaneura priapus =

Priapus batwing

Species of butterfly

Atrophaneura priapus, the Priapus batwing or white-head batwing, is a swallowtail butterfly found in Indonesia.

A. priapus is a large butterfly (11–14 cm wingspan). The forewings are black with the wing veins bordered by white. The hindwings are black and have a wavy margin. There is a broad, slightly yellowish white band on the hindwing. This band contains large black spots. In males there is a white area with red edge next to the body. The underside is similar to the upperside, but the white area is missing. The abdomen is yellow and black above. The head (hence the common name white-head batwing) and the underside of abdomen are white or yellow. The thorax is black.

== Subspecies ==
- Atrophaneura priapus luchti (Roepke, 1935) - Indonesia (Java)
- Atrophaneura priapus priapus (Boisduval, 1836) - Indonesia (Java)
- Atrophaneura priapus spaethi Jakusch, 2003 - Indonesia (Java)

See also

- Atrophaneura priapus dilutus (Fruhstorfer, 1895) east Java The band of the hindwing is above more or less distinctly shaded with black and the whole upper surface of the female is very pale.

The subspecies A. p. hageni was named to honour Hermann August Hagen. It is considered by some as a distinct valid species.

- Atrophaneura priapus hageni (Rogenhofer, 1889) Indonesia (Sumatra).

Description: Abdomen above black, beneath red and black. Forewing of the female very pale black-brown, the light stripes semitransparent. Hindwing in both sexes with large white discal area which encloses black discal spots, the cell broader than in sycorax.

== Biology ==
Atrophaneura priapus is a Troides mimic and is, itself mimicked by females of Papilio forbesi and Papilio lampsacus.

== Taxonomy ==
Atrophaneura priapus, A. priapus (elsewhere as A. priapus hageni) and A. sycorax, are often confused and may represent one, two or three valid species although the hindwing pouches and androconial scales are variously modified.

== Status ==
It is not known to be threatened, though the status is uncertain.
