= Baribis Fault =

Active fault in Java, Indonesia

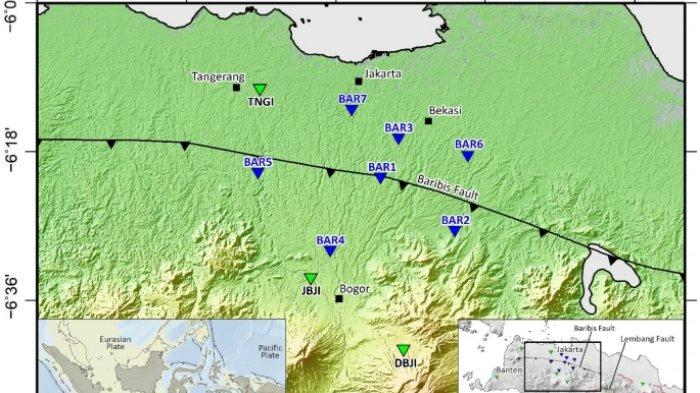
- Possible fault track
- Location: Java
- Country: Indonesia
- Region: West Java, Jakarta, Banten
- Cities: Bekasi, Jakarta, Depok, South Tangerang

Characteristics
- Segments: Bekasi-Purwakarta, Jakarta
- Length: 100 km (62 mi)
- Displacement: 5 mm/year

Tectonics
- Status: Active
- Earthquakes: 1834 Java earthquake
- Type: Thrust
- Age: Pliocene-Pleistocene

The Baribis Fault (Indonesian: Sesar Baribis) is a geological feature located in the northern part of Java. This fault, estimated to be 100 kilometers (62 miles) long, stretches from Purwakarta to Lebak Regency and is a threat to the Jakarta metropolitan area because the fault is partially located within the metropolitan area itself.

== Characteristics ==
The fault is estimated at 100 km long and stretches from Purwakarta to Lebak Regency, moving at a rate of 5 mm a year. It is a thrust fault formed during the Pliocene era. It divides into two segments.

== Fault activity ==
Half of the fault is locked but it caused a large earthquake in 1834 which resulted in five deaths and serious damage in West Java. It sometimes causes small earthquakes.

== Hazard ==
The fault passes through the Jakarta metropolitan area, which has a population of more than 30 million, where an earthquake could cause huge loss of life and damage.

== See also ==
- List of faults in Indonesia
- List of earthquakes in Indonesia
- 1834 Java earthquake
- Citarik Fault
