= Citarik Fault =

Geological feature

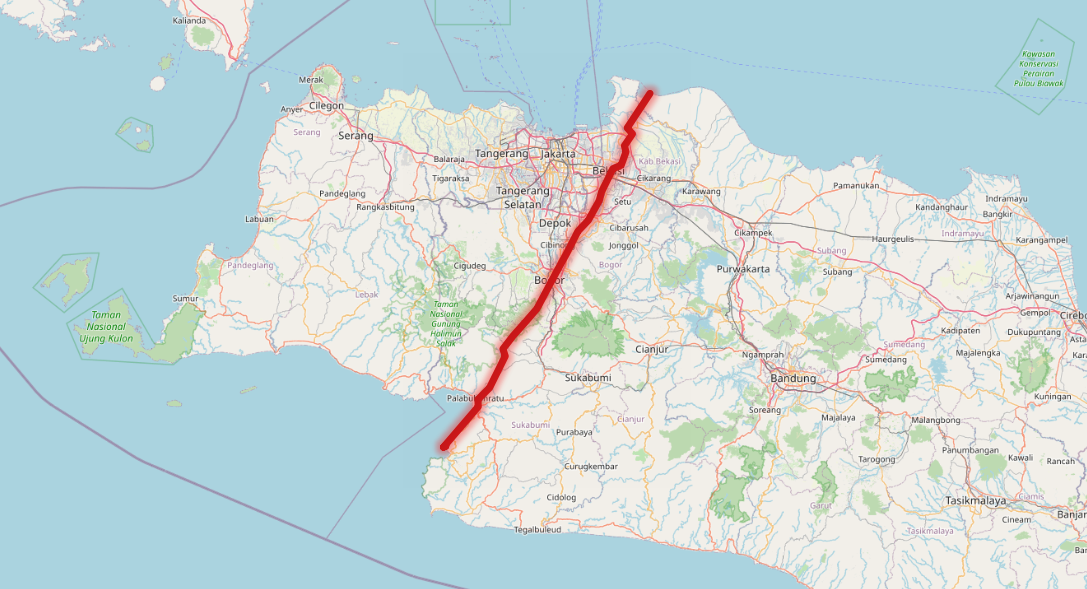
- Etymology: Citarik River
- Country: Indonesia
- Region: West Java
- Cities: Bogor, Depok, Bekasi

Characteristics
- Segments: South, Central, North
- Length: 250 km (160 mi)

Tectonics
- Status: Active
- Earthquakes: 2025 Bogor Earthquake (M_{w} 4.1); 1833 West Java Earthquake (M_{w} 7.0)
- Type: Strike-Slip
- Movement: Lateral
- Age: Miocene

The Citarik Fault is a strike-slip fault that cuts across Western Java, Indonesia, passing through Pelabuhan Ratu, Bogor and Bekasi. It is a long crack in the earth's crust where two tectonic plates move past each other. The fault has been active since the Middle Miocene period, about 15 million years ago.

== Tectonical history ==
At first, the Citarik Fault was a transtensional fault, meaning that the plates were moving apart and creating space for new crust to form. However, since the Plio-Pleistocene period, about 5 million years ago, the fault has changed into a left strike-slip fault, meaning that the plates are sliding horizontally past each other in opposite directions.

== Characteristics ==
This fault is a Left-Lateral Strike-Slip type fault and has a length of about 250 km, However this fault is segmented and divided into three segments: the southern, central, and northern segments, each with different characteristics and seismic potentials.

== Activity ==
This fault is not very seismically active, However this fault has caused several damaging earthquakes to occur, such as in March 2020 and December 2023. This fault also possibly has caused a magnitude M_{w} 7.0 earthquake in 1833.

On the night of Thursday, April 10, 2025, residents of Bogor City reported hearing a loud boom coinciding with an earthquake measuring magnitude 4.1. According to data from the Meteorology, Climatology, and Geophysics Agency (BMKG), the earthquake originated from activity along the Citarik Fault and was classified as a shallow crustal earthquake with a depth of around 5 km. Although the quake did not cause any surface faulting or liquefaction phenomena, monitoring of Mount Gede’s activity was increased due to its proximity to the earthquake's epicenter.

The Director of Earthquake and Tsunami at BMKG, Daryono, explained that the epicenter was located along the Citarik Fault, which has a left-lateral strike-slip movement mechanism. He also added that the rumbling sound heard was a common phenomenon in very shallow earthquakes, caused by high-frequency vibrations traveling near the surface. Despite the observed increase in activity, Mount Gede's status remains at Level I (Normal). According to Miat (69), a resident of Ranggamekar, Bogor, this was the first such event he had experienced in the past 30 years.

External image
- The epicenter of the 4.1 magnitude earthquake in Bogor City, West Java, Indonesia, on the night of Thursday, April 10th, 2025, is located close to the Citarik Fault . The earthquake, which produced a loud explosion-like sound heard by residents of the city, was triggered by activity along the Citarik Fault.

== Seismic hazard ==
This 250 kilometer long fault passes through and is near densely populated areas such as Jakarta metropolitan area which has a population of more than 30 million people. Soft ground conditions around the northern part of the fault such as in Bekasi and Jakarta can cause amplification of earthquake shocks.

== See also ==
- Baribis Fault
- List of faults in Indonesia
- List of earthquakes in Indonesia
