= Southern palm civet =

- Southern palm civet in Thailand

Scientific classification
- Kingdom: Animalia
- Phylum: Chordata
- Class: Mammalia
- Order: Carnivora
- Family: Viverridae
- Genus: Paradoxurus
- Species: P. musanga

Binomial name
- Paradoxurus musanga (Raffles, 1778)

Species of carnivore

The southern palm civet (Paradoxurus musanga) is a viverrid native to Southeast Asia.

== Taxonomy ==
The type specimen of Viverra musanga was collected in Sumatra and described by Raffles in 1821.

It was formerly considered conspecific with the northern palm civet (P. hermaphroditus). Morphological and molecular studies in 2015 recognized populations in the Indochinese and Sundaic regions as a distinct species.
