= Cibodas Botanical Garden =

Botanical garden in Java, Indonesia

Coordinates: 6°44′32.0″S 107°00′20.0″E

- Kebun Raya Cibodas
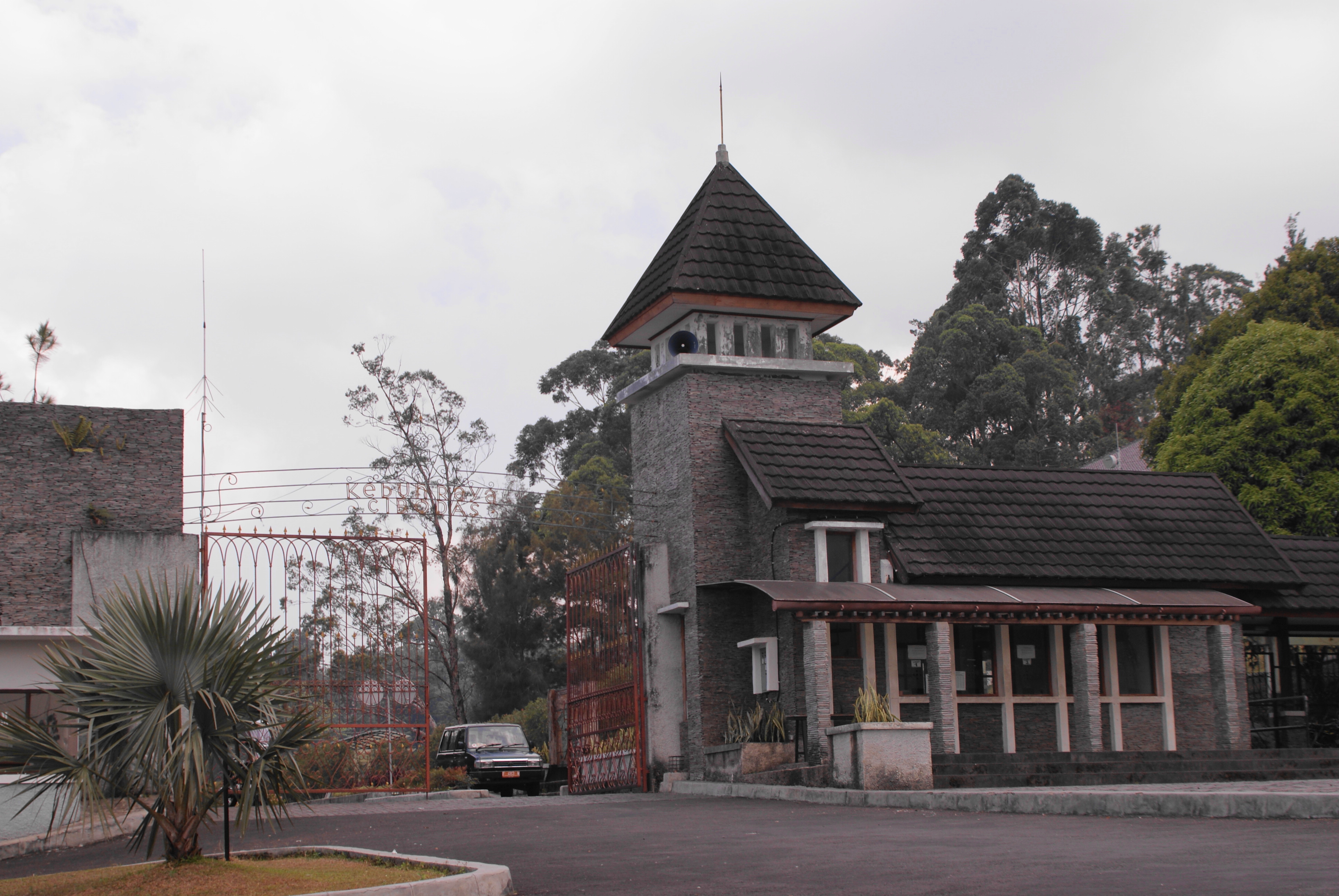
- Entrance to Cibodas Botanical Garden
- Interactive map of Cibodas Botanical Garden
- Type: Botanic Garden
- Location: Cimacan Village, Cianjur Regency, West Java
- Area: 84.99 hectares (210.0 acres; 0.8499 km^{2})
- Created: April 11, 1852
- Founder: Johannes Elias Teijsmann
- Operator: Indonesian Institute of Sciences
- Status: Open
- Website: kebunraya.id/r/cibodas

Cibodas Botanical Garden (Indonesian: Kebun Raya Cibodas, KRC) is a 84.99 hectares (210.0 acres) botanical garden on the slopes of Mount Gede, located in the Cibodas subdistrict of West Java, Indonesia. It was operated by the Indonesian Institute of Sciences (LIPI), which now has been transformed into the National Research and Innovation Agency (BRIN).

== History ==
The garden was founded in 1852 by the Dutch botanist Johannes Elias Teijsmann as a branch of the Bogor Botanical Gardens, and its layout was completed under Rudolph Scheffer in later years.

== Overview ==
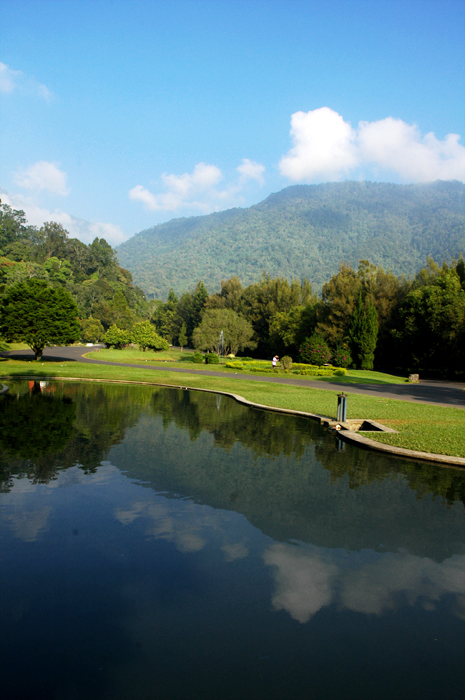
View of Mandalawangi Lake

The gardens were built at a high elevation, allowing the growth of subtropical plants. The garden is approximately 1,300–1,425 metres (4,265–4,675 ft) above mean sea level, with an average temperature across the year of 20.06 °C, and an average humidity of 80.82%.

The gardens are the first place where Cinchona trees were grown in Indonesia for quinine production in 1854. The trees were originally brought to Java by Justus Carl Hasskarl from South America and were successfully experimented with in the garden. Plants that are exotic to Indonesia, such as Eucalyptus from Australia, Conifers from Europe, and others are cultivated in the area.

== Collection ==
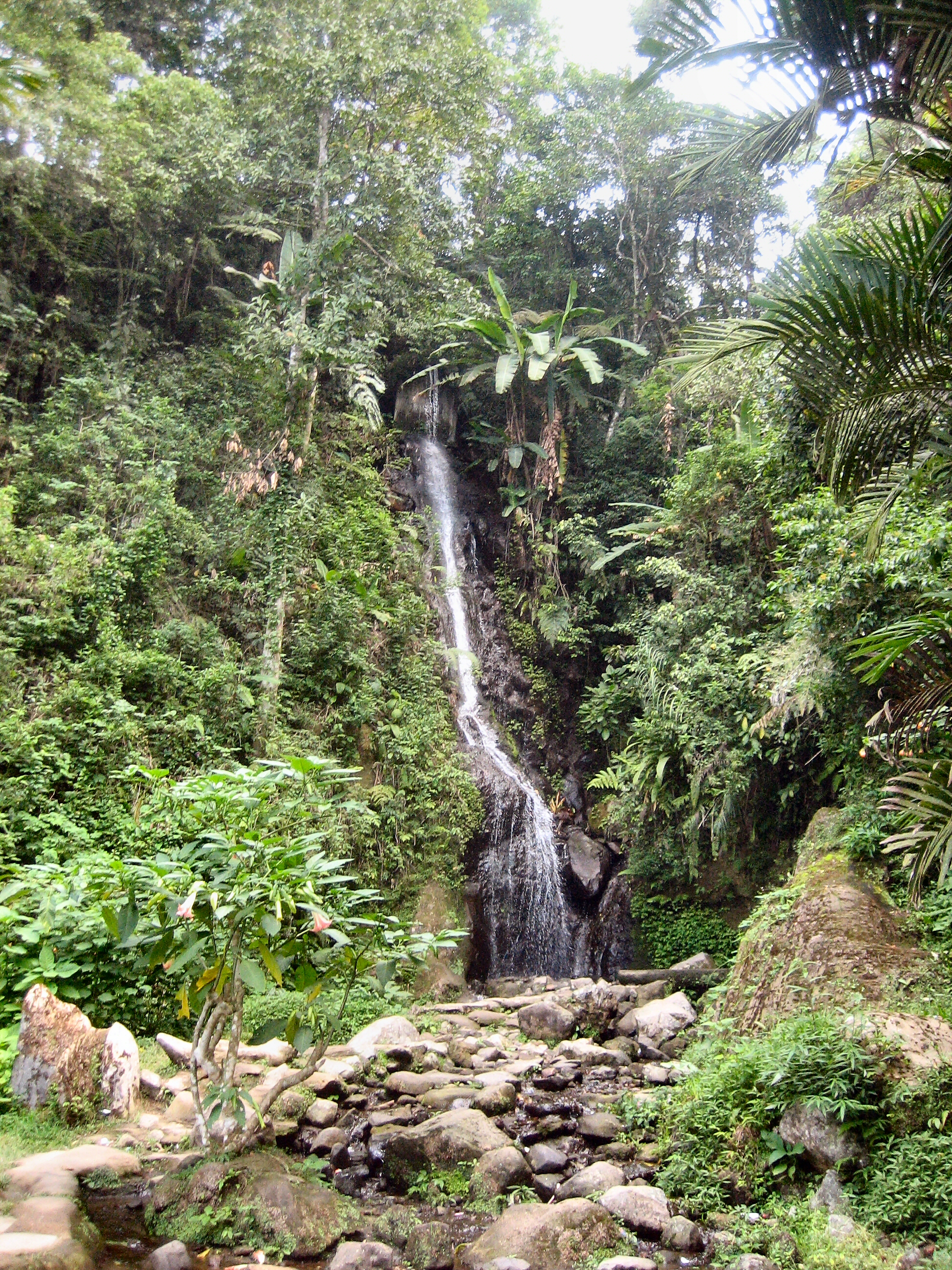
Cibodas Waterfall

There are approximately 10,792 living specimens in the garden, including 320 orchids, 289 cacti, 22 succulent plants, 216 algae, 103 ferns, and 1162 garden plant species that live within the proximity of the botanic garden. Only 114 of the plant species present in the garden are native to West Java. Its herbarium contains approximately 4,852 preserved specimens of plants.

The collections are divided into outdoor and indoor sections. The indoor section houses plants within glasshouses, including cacti and orchids. The outdoor section is divided into a sakura garden, algae garden, rhododendron garden, fern garden, and medicine garden.

In April 2014, the botanic garden opened a new section, the House of Nepenthes (Rumah Kantung Semar), containing 55 species and 47 hybrid species of Nepenthes.

== Cibodas Bryophyte Park ==
The Cibodas bryophyte park, or Taman Lumut Cibodas, is part of the Cibodas Botanical Garden and is located between Mount Gede and Mount Gede Pangrango National Park. It was built in 2004 and opened to the public officially on April 11, 2006, on the occasion of the 154th anniversary of the Cibodas Botanical Gardens. The 1,500 m2 garden was designed to resemble the natural habitat of mosses. Natural shade is also provided by the shade of native Indonesian plants that grow around it to give the desired humid conditions.

== Gallery ==
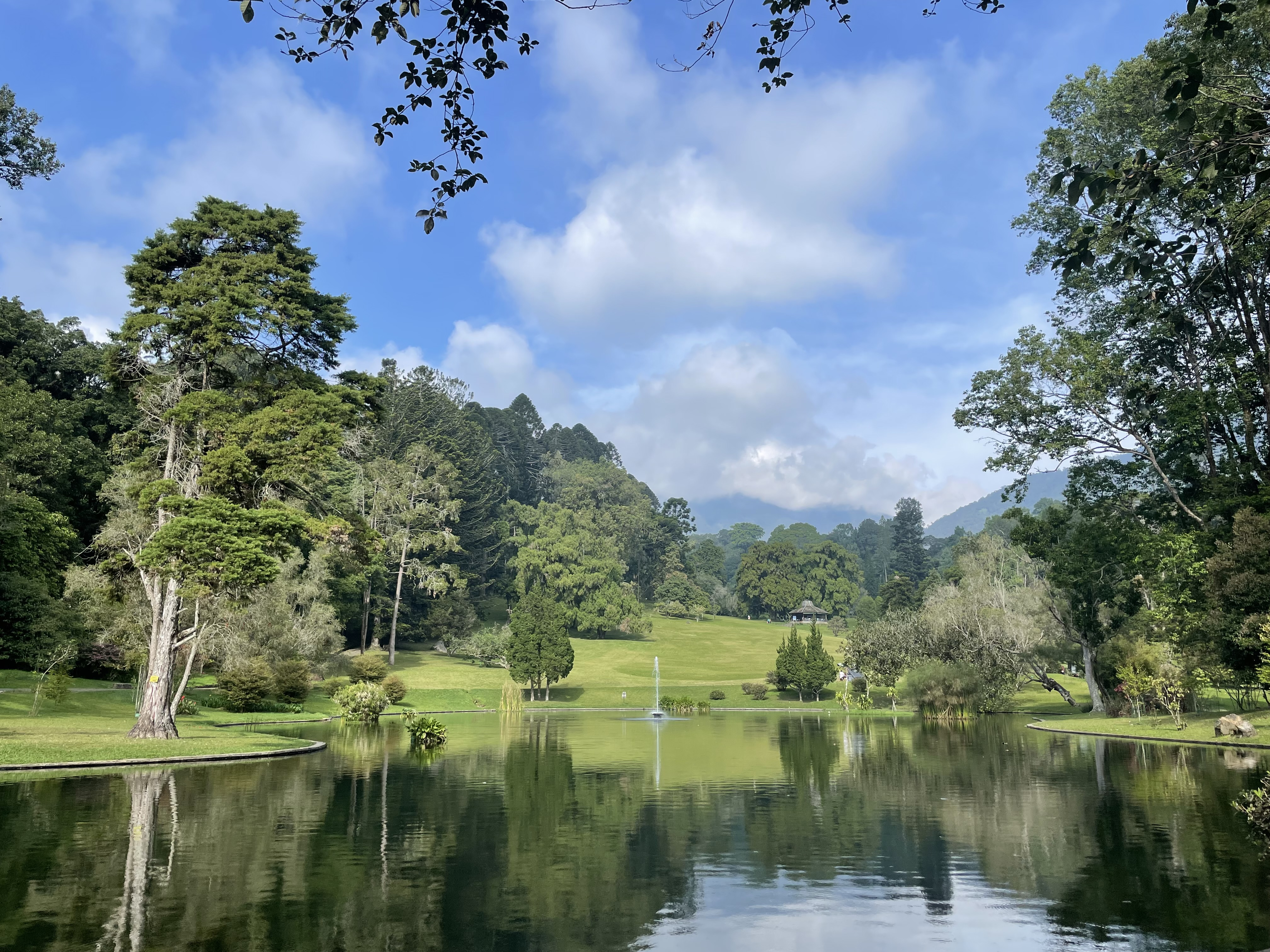
Main Pond at Cibodas Botanical Garden

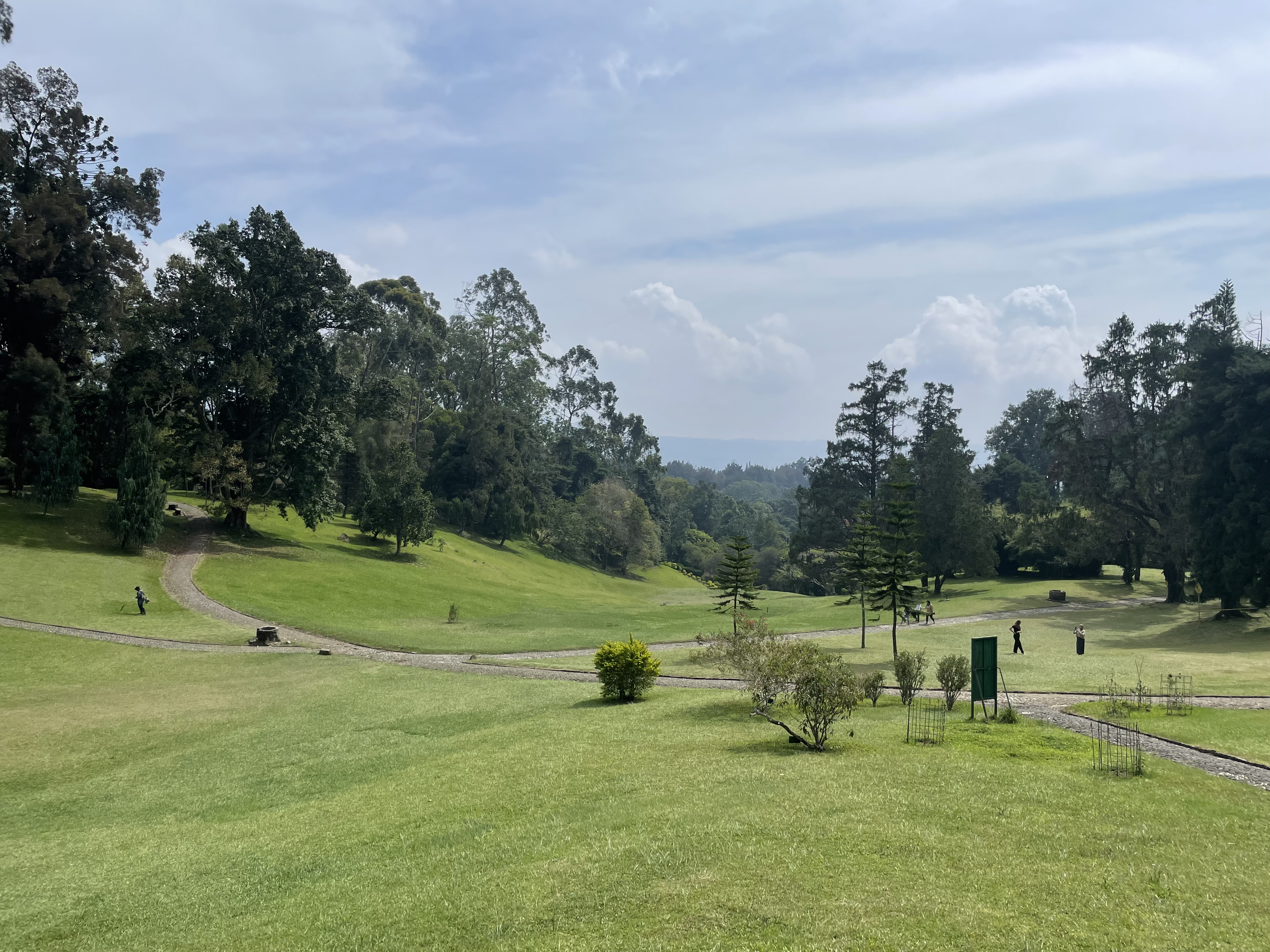
Green Area at Cibodas Botanical Garden

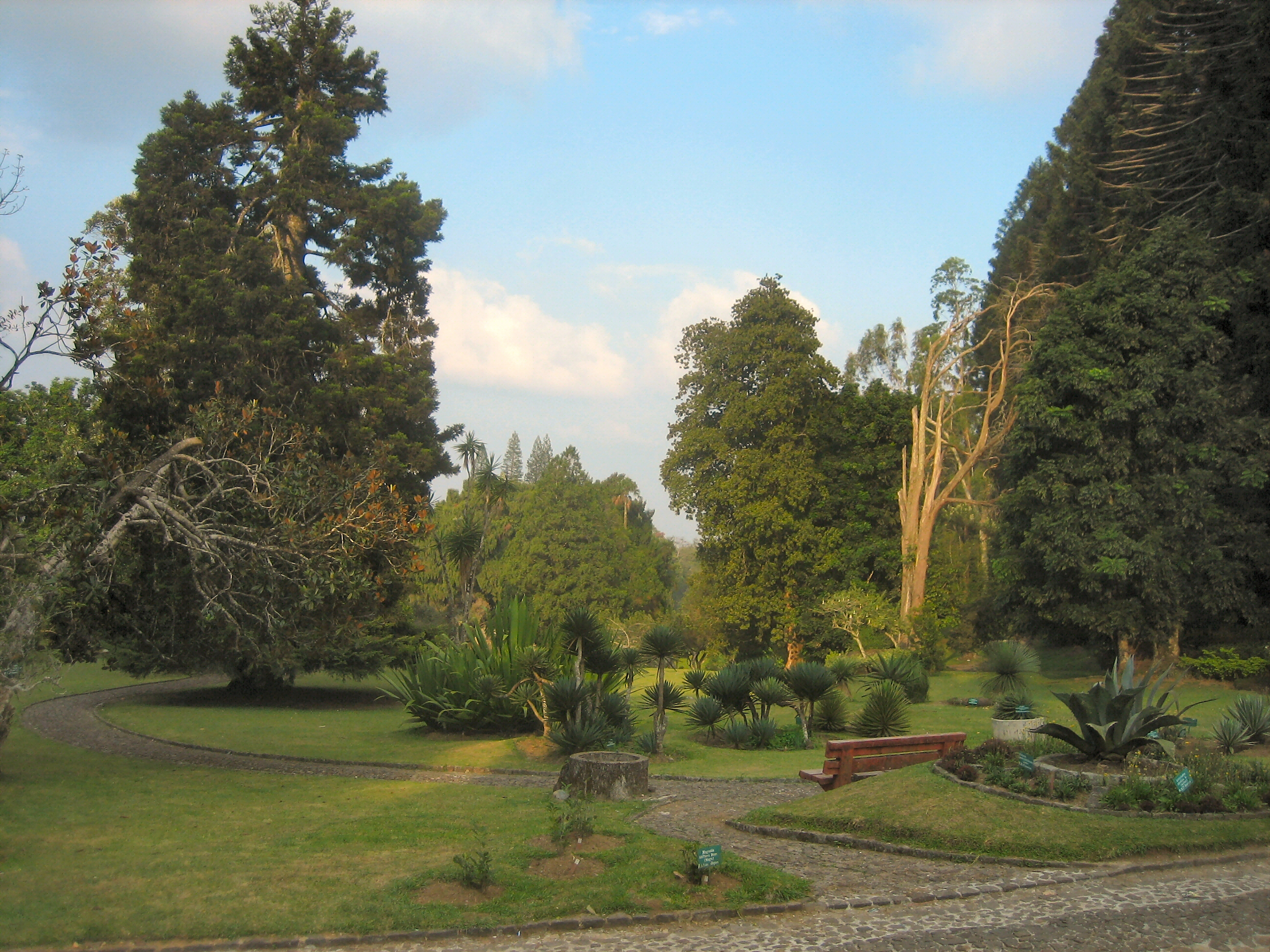

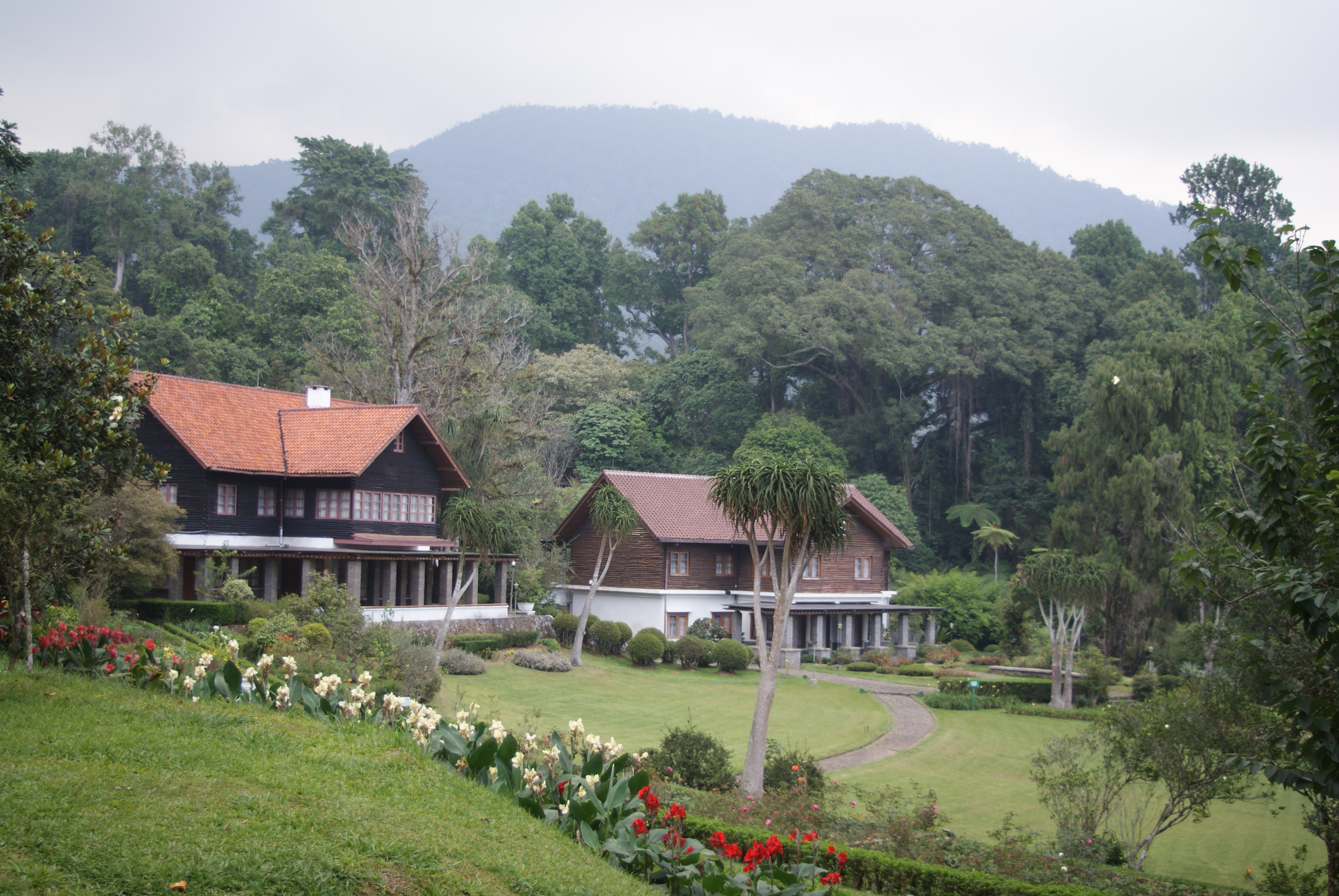
Guest houses

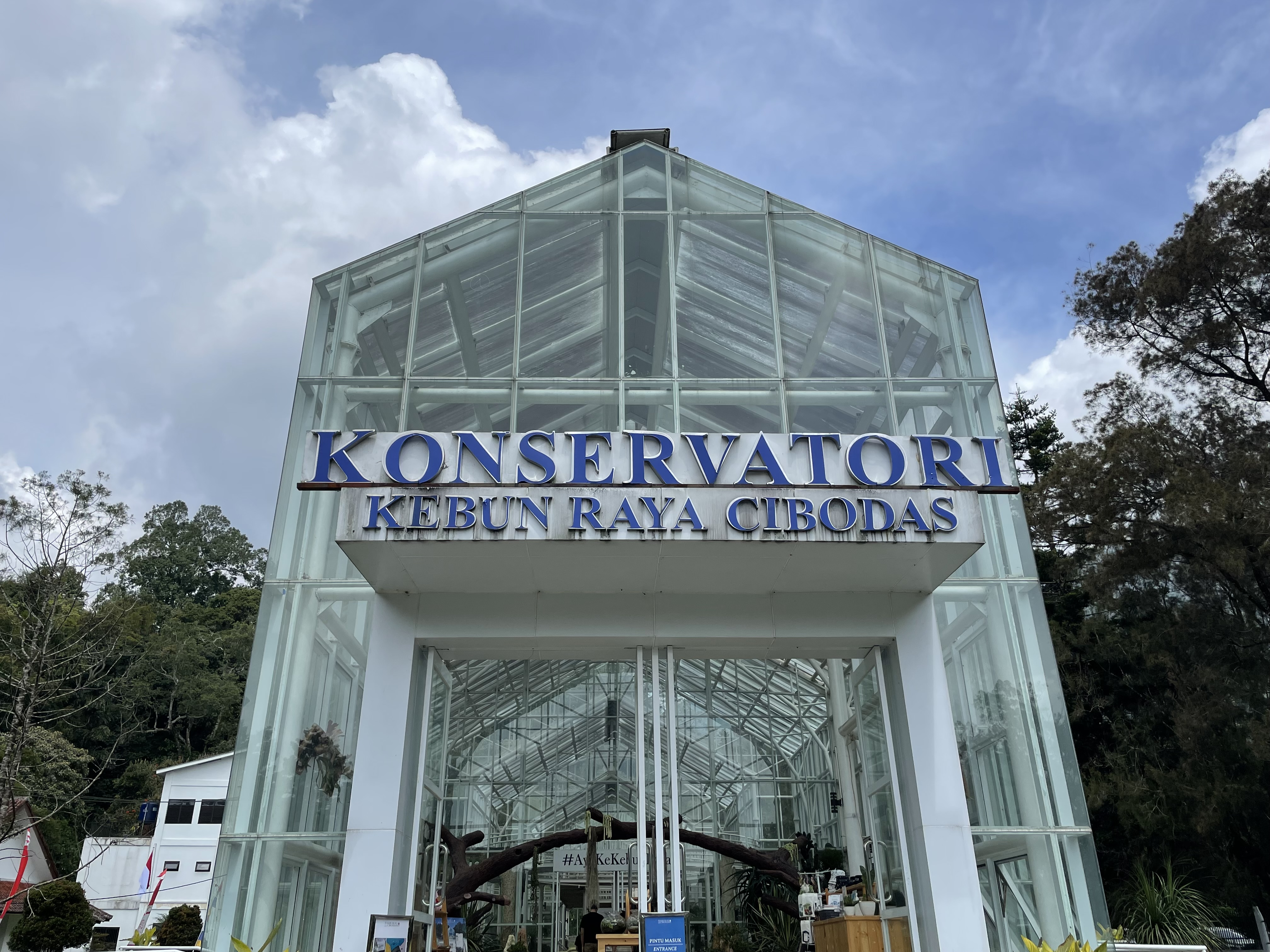
The conservatory building at Cibodas Botanical Garden

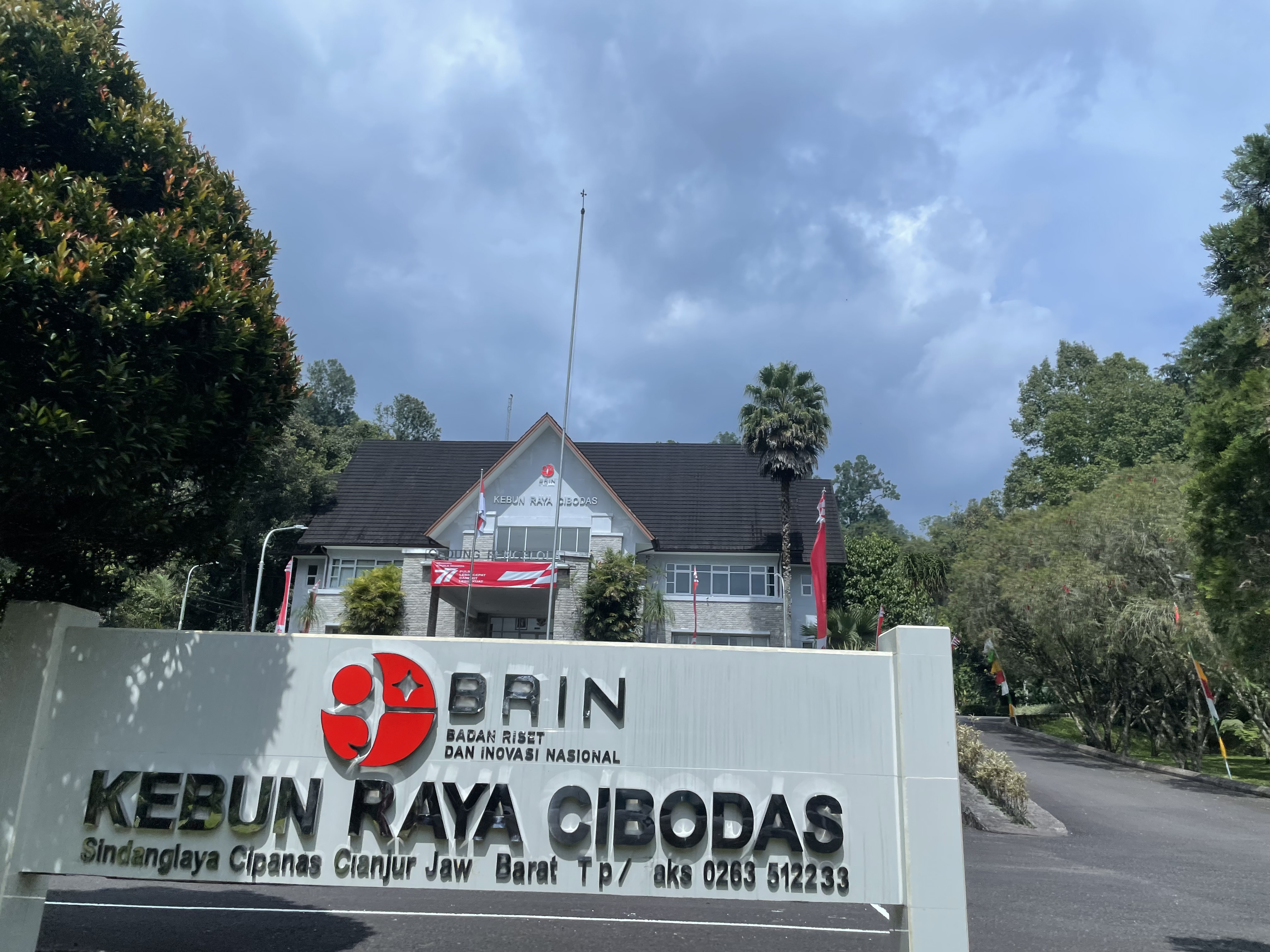
Cibodas Botanical Garden main office

== See also ==
- List of botanical gardens
