= Matano Fault =

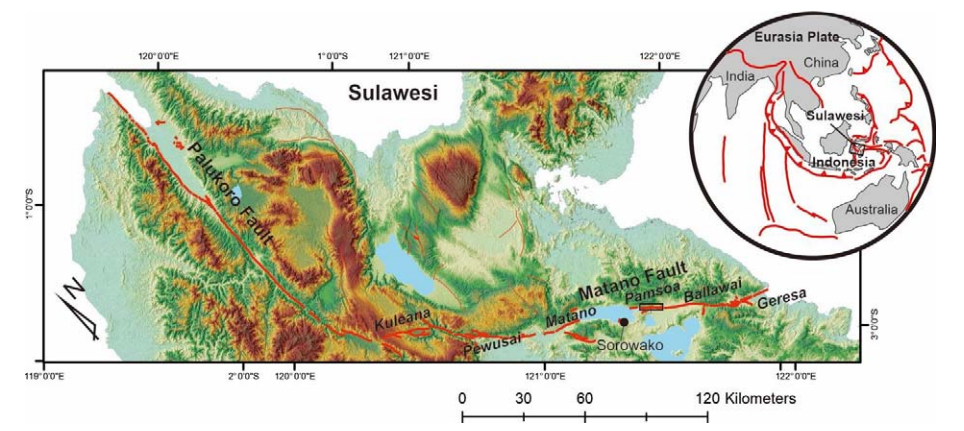
Map of the Matano Fault, Sulawesi from Daryono et al. 2021

The Matano fault is a major active WNW-ESE trending left lateral strike-slip fault on the island of Sulawesi. It extends for about 190 km from near the southern end of the Palu-Koro Fault in the west, to Kolono Bay on the east coast of the island.

== Geometry ==
The fault zone is subdivided into six main segments. From west to east, these are the Kuleana, Pewusai, Matano, Pamsoa, Ballawi and Geresa segments. Lake Matano is formed as a pull-apart basin in a releasing stepover between the Pamsoa and Matano segments of the fault zone. The fault zone extends offshore to the east and may link to the Tolo Thrust and/or the South Sula Fault.

== Regional setting ==
Together with the Palu-Koro Fault, this fault zone forms part of the boundary between two of the major crustal blocks that form the island, the North Sula Block to the north and east and the Makassar Block to the south and west. The current slip rate along the Matano Fault is estimated to be in the range 17 to 28 millimetres (0.67 to 1.10 in) per year.

== Seismicity ==
No earthquake has been recorded along the Matano fault zone for at least 200 years. Paleoseismic investigations on some of the segments have revealed evidence of past ruptures. Five faulting events have been detected along the easternmost Geresa segment of the fault, three in the last 1,000 years. The most recent is dated to between 1432 and 1819 with a rupture length of ~110 km and an estimated magnitude of ~7.4 M_{w}. The recurrence interval interpreted from these observations is 335±135 years, suggesting that a further rupture is likely due.
