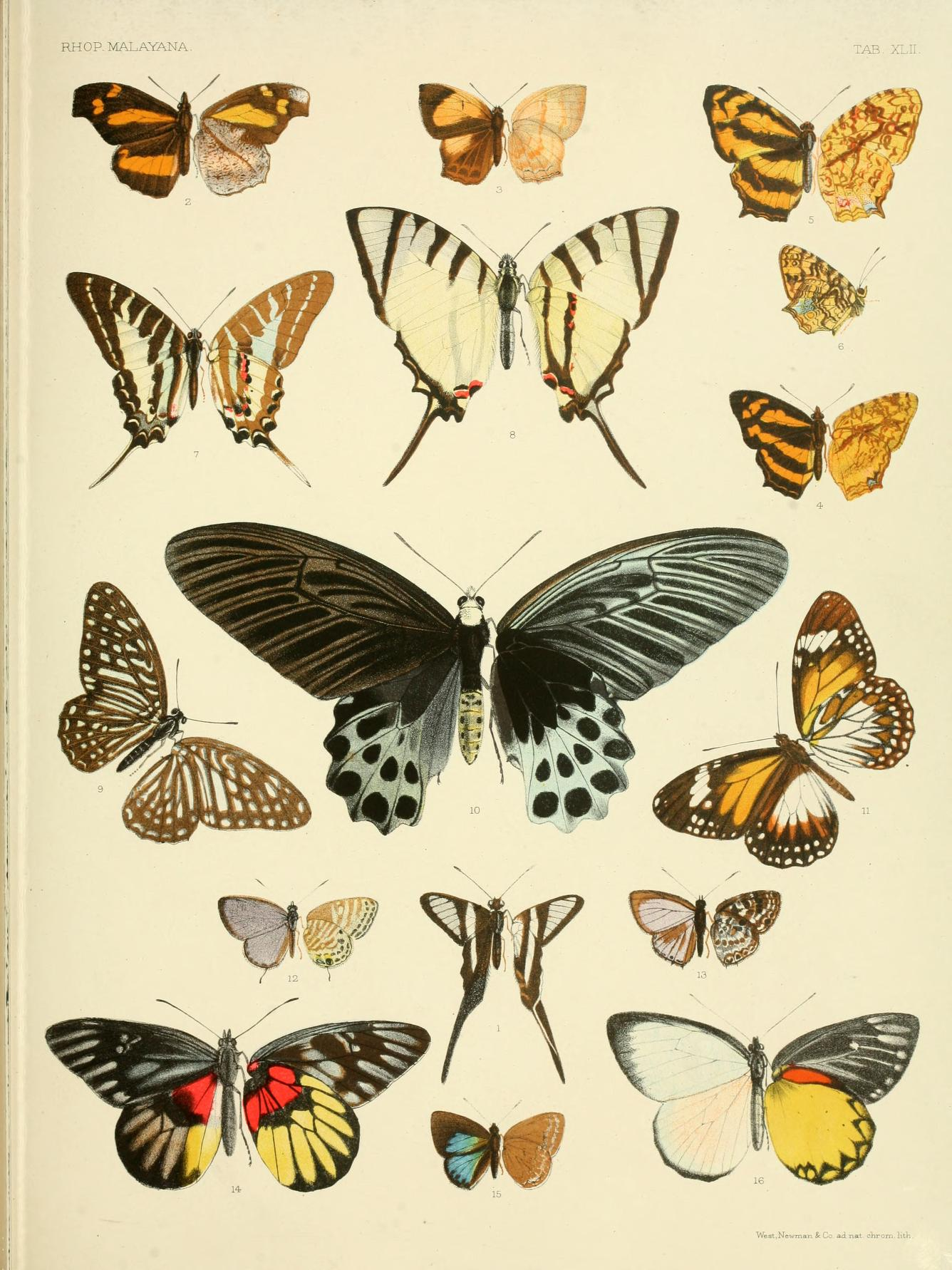
- A. sycorax depicted in Rhopalocera Malayana (figure 10)

Scientific classification
- Kingdom: Animalia
- Phylum: Arthropoda
- Clade: Pancrustacea
- Class: Insecta
- Order: Lepidoptera
- Family: Papilionidae
- Genus: Atrophaneura
- Species: A. sycorax

Binomial name
- Atrophaneura sycorax (Grose-Smith, 1885)

Synonyms
- Papilio sycorax Grose-Smith, 1885; Papilio sycorax Rothschild, 1895; Papilio egertoni Distant, 1886; Parides sycorax egertoni; Papilio egertoni Distant, 1886

= Atrophaneura sycorax =

Species of butterfly

Atrophaneura sycorax is a species of butterfly from the family Papilionidae that is found from southern Burma to Peninsular Malaysia, and in Sumatra and western Java.

The wingspan is 130–140 mm. The wings are black. There is a wide dull-white marking on each of the hindwings. The body is completely covered in yellow hair. Females can be black or dark brown. The wing veins are bordered in white.

== Description in Seitz ==
P. sycorax Gr.-Sm. (= egertoni Dist.) (17 a, b). Head and collar white; abdomen above bluish grey with a row of black dots at each side, beneath yellow. Upper surface of the male velvety black, of the female much paler and more metallic; hindwing from near the apex of the cell to the black marginal band blue-grey, with a row of black discal spots; beneath this area is much lighter and extends to the margin, the posterior black marginal spots being separated from one another and from the margin. — West and East Sumatra and Malay Peninsula, in hilly country. Karl Jordan in Seitz (page 29)

== Biology ==
The butterfly flies high and quickly, and is especially often taken at flowering trees in the woods The larvae feed on Aristolochia species: A. cathcartii, A. coadunata, A. singalangensis and Thottea species.

== Subspecies ==
- Atrophaneura sycorax sycorax (Sumatra)
- Atrophaneura sycorax egertoni (Distant, 1886) (southern Burma to Peninsular Malaya)
- Atrophaneura sycorax pariwononis Tsukada & Nishiyama (western Java)
