= Mount Pangrango =

Volcano in West Java, Indonesia

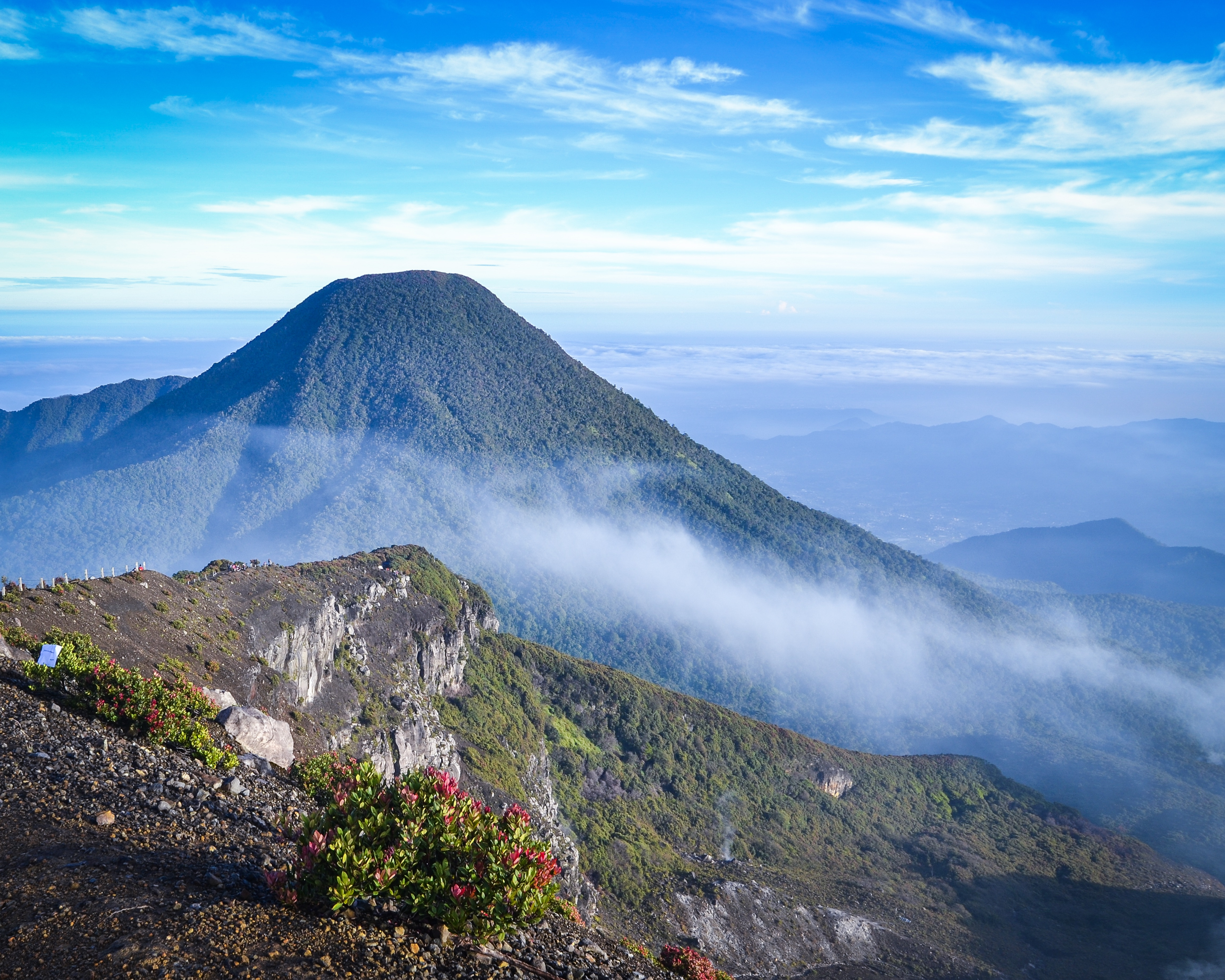
- Mount Pangrango viewed from the peak of Mount Gede

Highest point
- Elevation: 3,026 m (9,928 ft)
- Prominence: 2,426 m (7,959 ft)
- Listing: Ultras; Ribu
- Coordinates: 6°46′38″S 106°58′52″E

Geography
- Location within Java
- Location: West Java, Indonesia

Geology
- Mountain type: Stratovolcano
- Volcanic arc: Sunda Arc
- Last eruption: Unknown

Climbing
- First ascent: 1815 by Raffles
- Easiest route: Cibodas

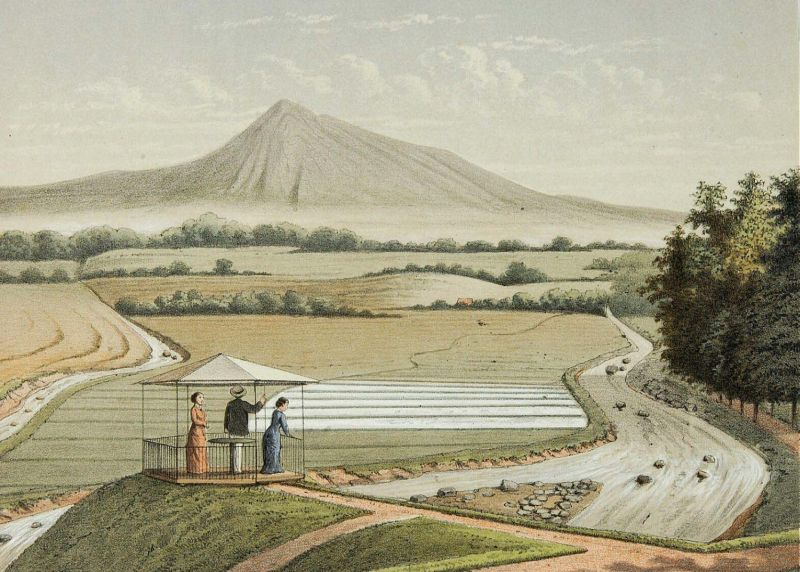
Lithograph from the 1880s depicting Mount Pangrango seen from Bogor Botanical Gardens

Mount Pangrango is a dormant stratovolcano located in the Sunda Arc of West Java, Indonesia. This mountain is formed by a subduction zone on the southern coast of Java as part of the Sunda Plate facing the Australian Plate which contains the Indian Ocean. It is located about 80 kilometres (50 mi) south of Jakarta, the capital of Indonesia.

It has a height of 3,026 m (9,928 ft). Its peak is called Mandalawangi, which forms a tripoint border between Bogor, Cianjur and Sukabumi Regency. The mountain is located northwest of Mount Gede in the vicinity of Gunung Gede Pangrango National Park.

== Name ==
The origin of the name Pangrango is speculated to be from two ancient Sundanese words pang and rango which means "That which huffs and puffs", referring to the past volcanic activity of this mountain.

== Geography ==
The Mandalawangi peak of the mountain is a tripoint where the borders of Bogor, Cianjur, and Sukabumi Regencies meet. It is the second-highest mountain in West Java after Mount Cereme. Mount Pangrango ranked 26th of the Ribus of Indonesia with a topographic prominence of 2,426 m (7,959 ft). The mountain is seen from Bogor and Sukabumi, while it is slightly obscured by the neighboring Mount Gede if seen from Cianjur. On a very clear day, it can be seen from Jakarta.

== Ecology ==
The mountain has a montane ecosystem consisting of Dipterocarpaceae and Ericaceae plants.

== Hydrology ==
Mount Pangrango serves as the headwater area for four river basins that surround it, and all four of them converge around the mountain's peak. Three of these basins, namely the Cisadane River Basin, Ciliwung River Basin, and Citarum River Basin, flow northward towards Java, while the last one, the Cimandiri River Basin, flows southward towards Java.

== See also ==
- Cibodas Botanical Garden
- List of ultras of the Malay Archipelago
