= Mount Gede Pangrango National Park =

National park on Java island, Indonesia

- Taman Nasional Gunung Gede Pangrango
- IUCN category II (national park)
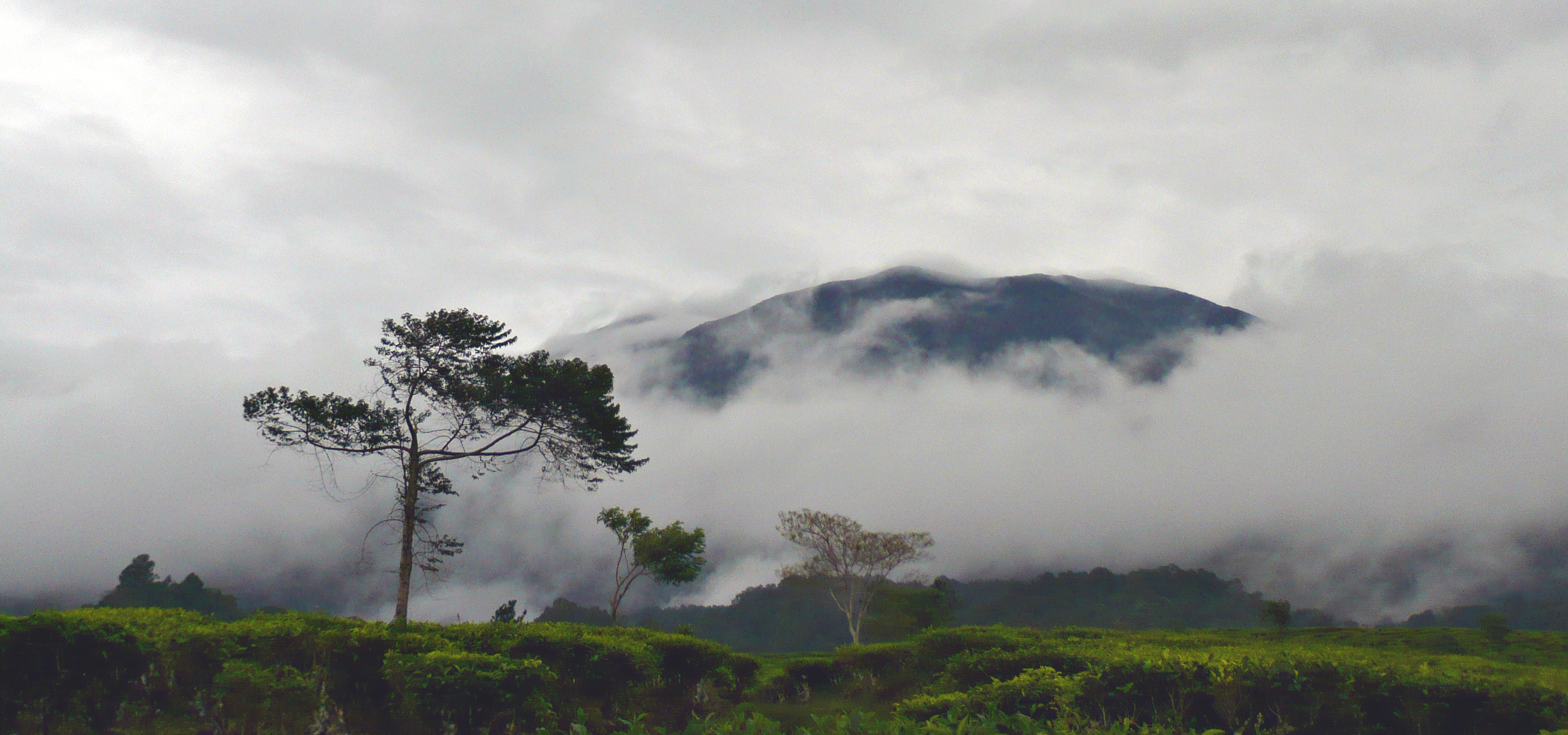
- View of Gunung Gede from the nearby tea plantation

- Location within Java Location within Indonesia
- Location: West Java, Indonesia
- Nearest city: Bogor
- Coordinates: 6°46′0″S 106°56′0″E
- Area: 151.96 km^{2} (58.67 sq mi)
- Established: 1980
- Governing body: Ministry of Environment and Forestry
- Website: www.gedepangrango.org

Mount Gede Pangrango National Park is a national park in West Java, Indonesia. The park is centred on two volcanoes—Mount Gede and Mount Pangrango—and is 150 km² in area.

It evolved from already existing conservation areas, such as Cibodas Botanical Gardens, Cimungkat Nature Reserve, Situgunung Recreational Park, and Mount Gede Pangrango Nature Reserve, and has been the site of important biological and conservation research over the last century. In 1977 UNESCO declared it part of the World Network of Biosphere Reserves.

== Topography and ecology ==
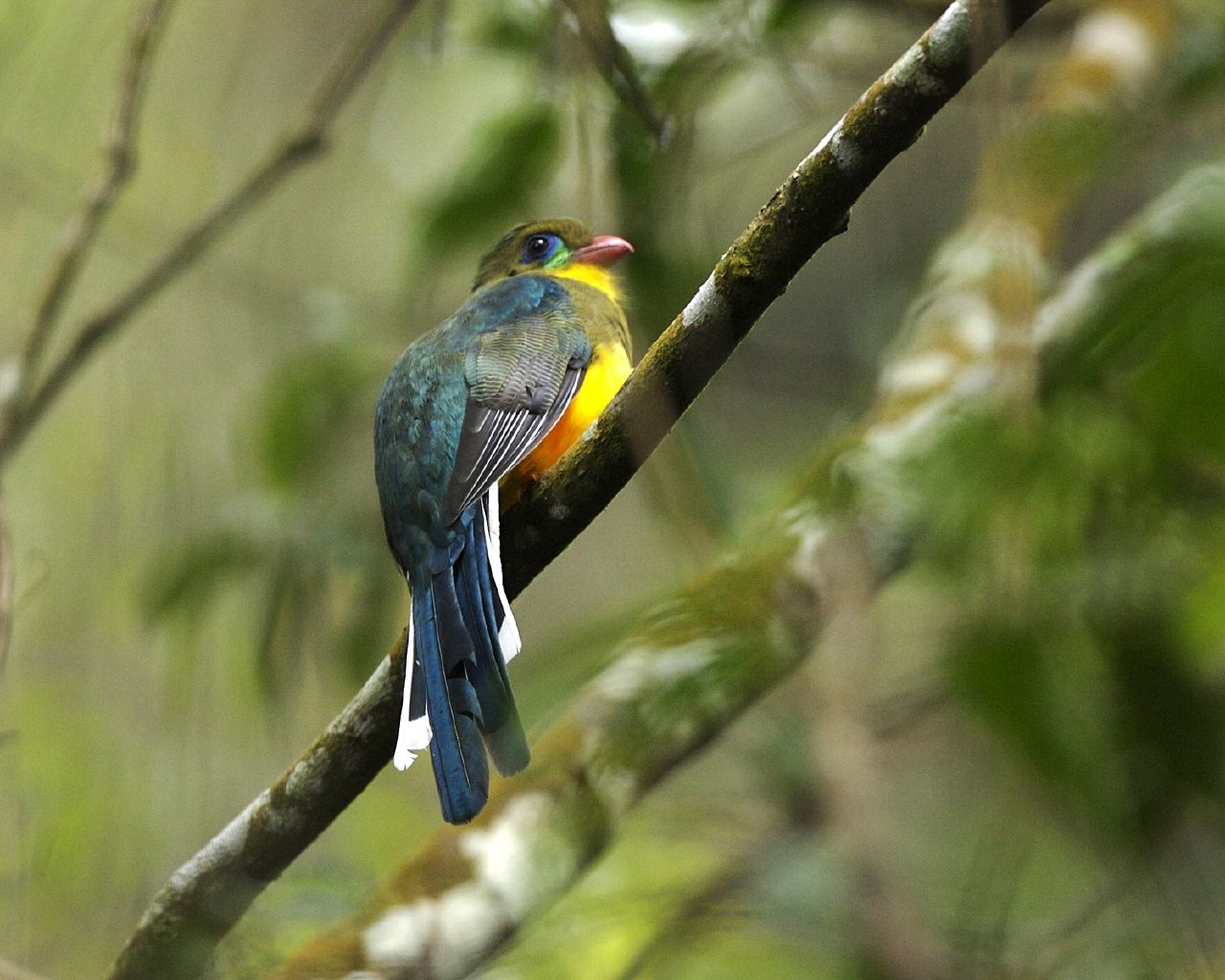
The Javan trogon found in the national park, is an endangered species endemic to West Java

Mount Gede (2,958 m) and Pangrango (3,019 m) are twin volcanoes. The two summits are connected by a high saddle known as Kandang Badak (2,400 m). The mountain slopes are very steep and are cut into rapidly flowing streams, which carve deep valleys and long ridges.

Lower and upper montane and subalpine forests are within the park and have been well studied. To the north of Mount Gede is a field of Javanese Edelweiss (Anaphalis javanica). The park contains a large number of species known to occur only within its boundaries, however, this may be a result of the disproportionate amount of research over many years.

The Mount Gede Pangrango National Park serves as the upper watershed for 4 river basins in the region, three of which are the Cisadane River Basin, Ciliwung River Basin, and Citarum River Basin. All of their main tributaries flow towards the northern coast of Java, eventually reaching the Java Sea. On the other hand, the main tributary of the Cimandiri River basin flows towards the southern coast of Java and drains into the Indian Ocean.

== Flora and fauna ==
Gunung Gede-Pangrango is inhabited by 251 of the 450 bird species found in Java. Among these are endangered species like the Javan hawk-eagle and the Javan scops owl.

Among the endangered mammal species in the Park, there are several primates such as the silvery gibbon, the Javan surili and Javan lutung. Other mammals include the Javan leopard, leopard cat, Indian muntjac, Java mouse-deer, Sumatran dhole, Malayan porcupine, Sunda stink badger, yellow-throated marten, and Bartels's rat.

== Tourism ==
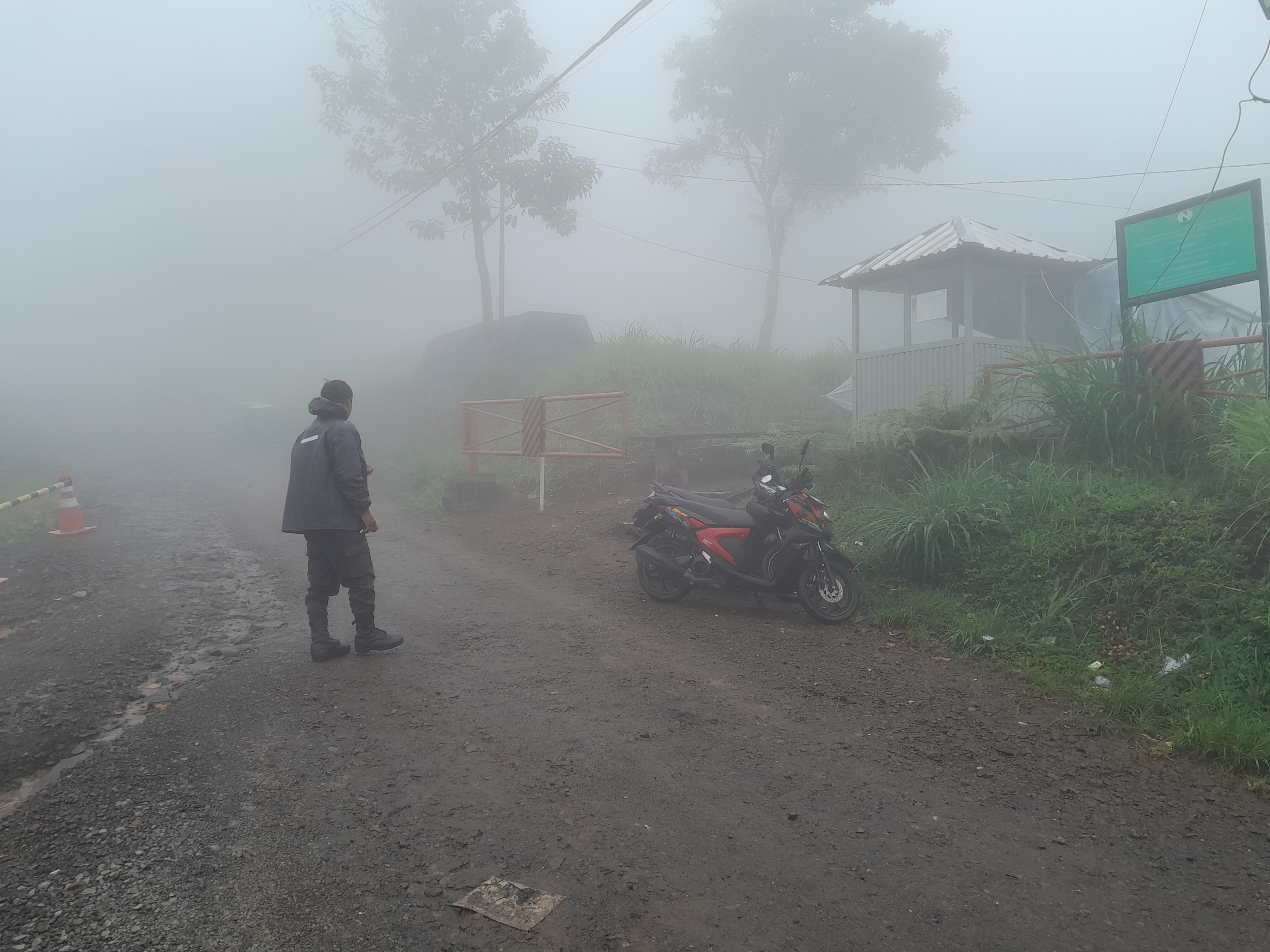
Thick fog at the entrance to a privatised tourism area of the national park.

Visitors usually enter the park by one of the four gates of the park: the Cibodas, Gunung Putri, and Selabintana gates, all give access to the peaks; the Situ Gunung gate gives entrance to a lake area set aside mainly for family-style recreation. Cibodas gate is the most popular entrance gate and is the site of the park's headquarters. From Jakarta, the area is two hours drive, usually via Cibodas Botanical Gardens.

== See also ==
- Volcanoes of Indonesia
- Geography of Indonesia
