= Palu-Koro Fault =

The Palu-Koro Fault or Palu-Koro Fault System is a major active NNW-SSE trending left-lateral strike-slip fault zone on the island of Sulawesi in Indonesia. It caused the 2018 Sulawesi earthquake and tsunami.

== Geometry ==
It extends from near Dondowa, North Luwu Regency, in the south, where it links to the WNW-ESE trending Matano Fault. It continues northwards, heading offshore through the Gulf of Palu and passing to the west of the Minahassa Peninsula, before eventually linking with the North Sulawesi Subduction Zone. Although it is a strike slip fault, there are locally normal and thrust features and segments. Near Palu it forms the western side of the Palu Basin, a small pull-apart basin developed along the fault system.

== Regional setting ==
The fault forms part of the boundary between two of the major crustal blocks that form the island, the North Sula Block and the Makassar Block. The current slip rate along the Palu-Koro Fault is estimated to be in the range 30 to 40 millimetres (1.2 to 1.6 in) per year, compared to a long term slip rate of 40 to 50 millimetres (1.6 to 2.0 in) per year over the last 5 million years.

== Seismicity ==
The fault is known to be highly active and several historical earthquakes are thought to have occurred on this zone, in 1905, 1907, 1909, 1927, 1934, 1968, 1985 and 1993. From trenching across the fault, three major earthquakes have been identified over the last 2,000 years, suggesting a recurrence interval for major earthquakes of about 700 years. That recurrence interval is insufficient to account for the long-term slip-rate, suggesting that either aseismic creep is important in this fault zone or that other strands have been active, away from the main fault trace.

== See also ==
- Banda Sea plate
- Molucca Sea plate
