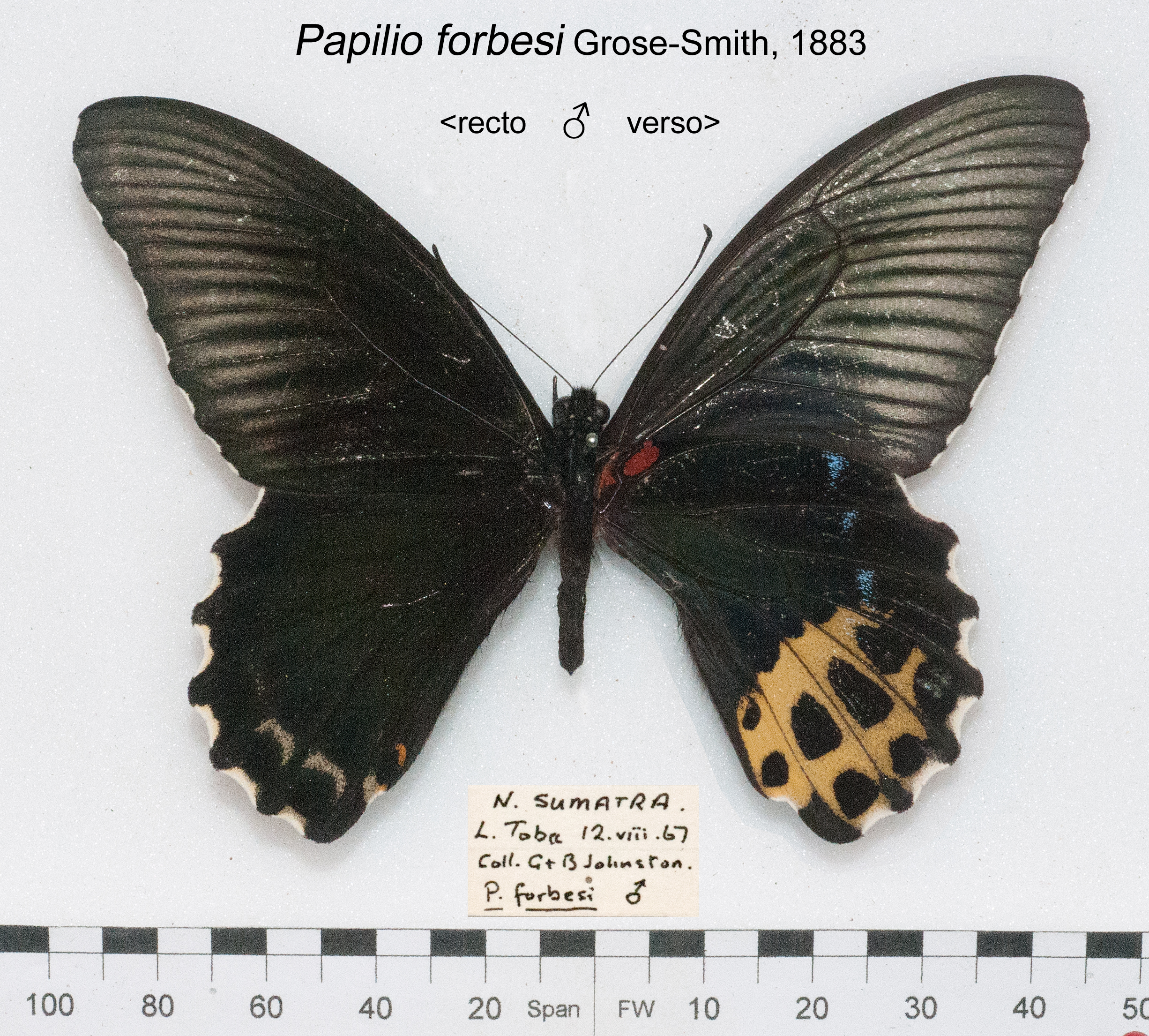

Scientific classification
- Kingdom: Animalia
- Phylum: Arthropoda
- Clade: Pancrustacea
- Class: Insecta
- Order: Lepidoptera
- Family: Papilionidae
- Genus: Papilio
- Species: P. forbesi

Binomial name
- Papilio forbesi Grose-Smith, 1883

Synonyms
- Menelaides forbesi

= Papilio forbesi =

Species of butterfly

Papilio forbesi is a butterfly of the family Papilionidae. It is endemic to Sumatra.

== Description ==
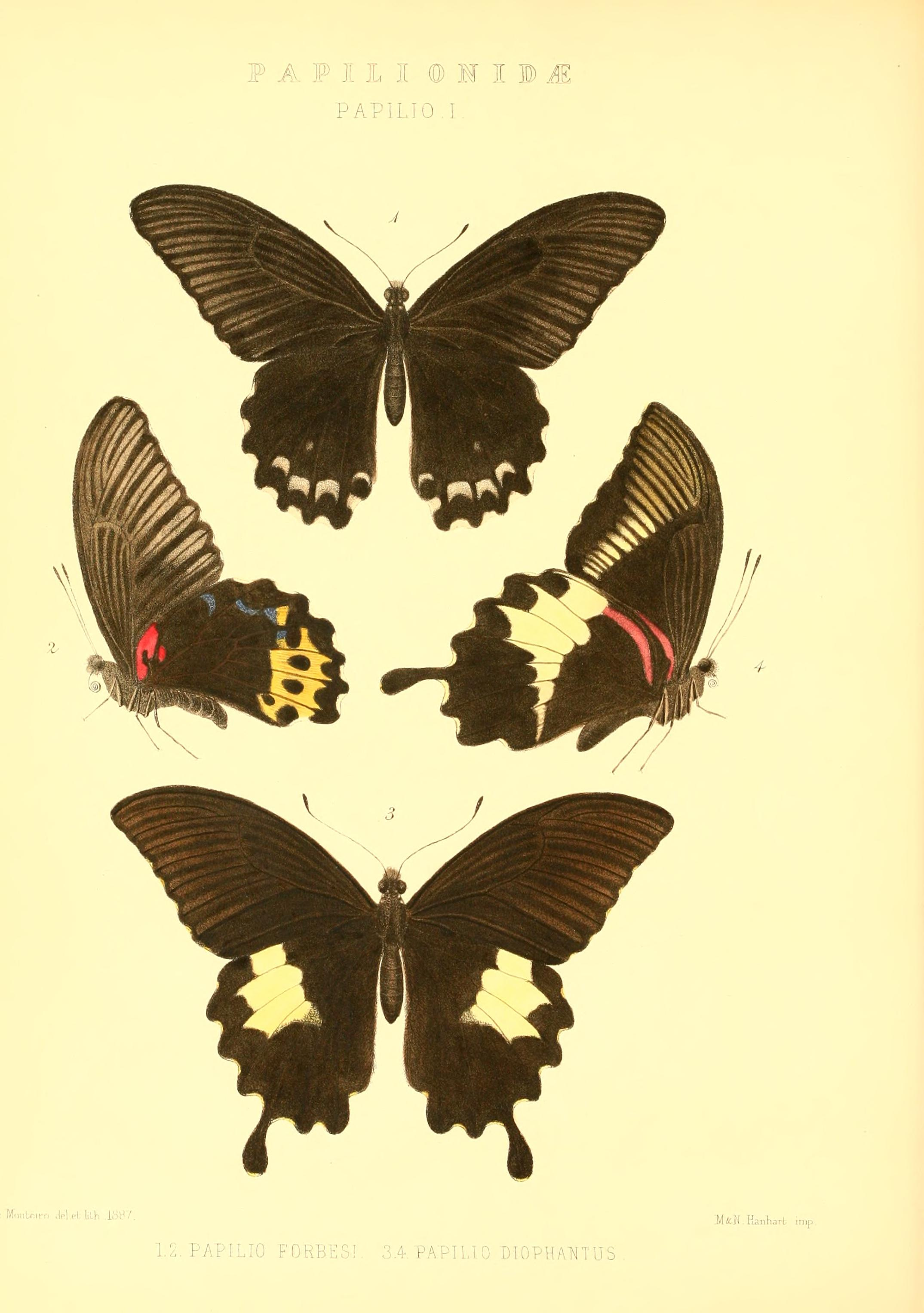
Papilio forbesi in Rhopalocera Exotica (figs. 1, 2)

P. Forbesi, Henley Grose Smith, Entomologist's Monthly Magazine, xix., p. 234 (March, 1883); Forbes, " Naturalist's Wanderings," p. 275 (1885).

Upperside. Dark brown, almost black, the margins between the nervures with lunular white spots; very narrow on the anterior wing; much broader on the posterior wing, which is without tails. Anterior wings with longitudinal rays on each side of the nervures, of light brown, extending from the middle to the exterior margin. Posterior wing with a row of three brownish-grey lunular spots between the median nervules, and a spot at the anal angle, above which is a row of three small faintly marked spots of same colour.

Underside. Anterior wings rayed as above, but paler. Posterior wing with a longitudinal red spot at the base, divided by the precostal nervure, which is black, and a small red spot below the costal nervure; a broad band of ochreous yellow with a row of black spots in the middle, extending across the wing between the median nervules, and a small spot of ochreous-yellow beyond; a black spot at the top of the band next the anal angle; three blue spots near the exterior margin from the costal nervure to the median nervule.

" Exp. 4 inches. Hal). Bandang Agang, Sumatra (Forbes). In the Collection of Henley Grose Smith. "This species belongs to the Memnon group, in which, however, there is nothing which resembles it." (H. G. S. in Entomologist's Monthly Magazine, l.c.). Described from two male specimens, almost identical in colour and markings. It is, perhaps, most nearly allied to Papilio Lampsacus, Boisd. The red spot at the base of the hind wings is not completely divided by the curved black stripe which runs up along the precostal nervure. The wingspan is 90–100 mm.

== Biogeographic realm ==
Indomalayan realm (Sundaland)
