= Mount Gede =

Stratovolcano in West Java, Indonesia

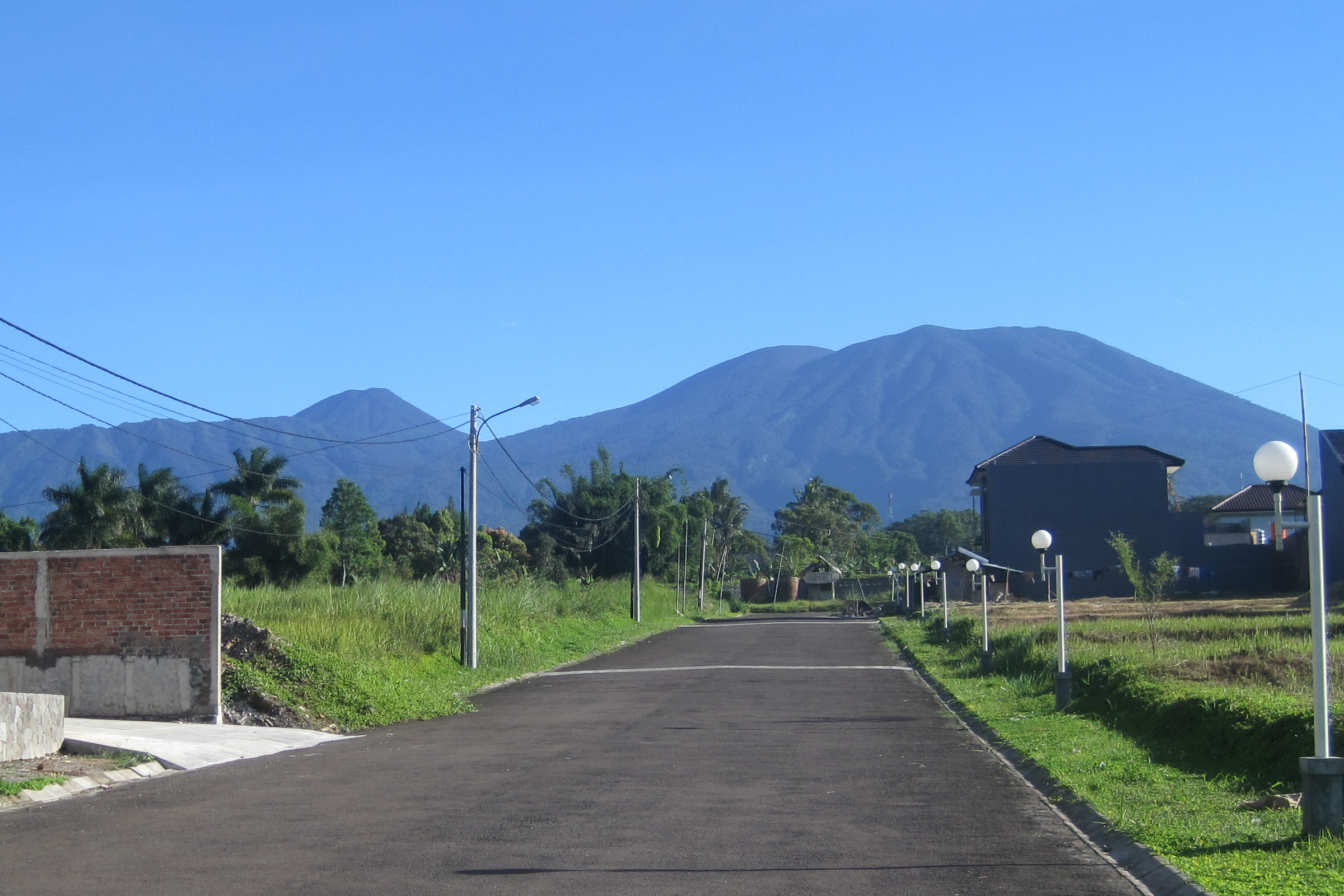
- Mount Gede's southern side is seen from Sukabumi Regency. The smaller peak on the left is Mount Pangrango

Highest point
- Elevation: 2,962 m (9,718 ft)
- Prominence: 2,958 m (9,705 ft)
- Listing: List of volcanoes in Indonesia
- Coordinates: 6°47′S 106°59′E

Geography
- Location within Java Location within Indonesia
- Location: West Java, Indonesia

Geology
- Mountain type: Stratovolcano
- Volcanic arc: Sunda Arc
- Last eruption: March 1957

Climbing
- First ascent: 1815 by Raffles
- Easiest route: Cibodas

Mount Gede (Indonesian: Gunung Gede; lit. 'Big Mountain' in Sundanese) is a stratovolcano in West Java, Indonesia. The volcano contains two peaks with Mount Gede as one peak and Mount Pangrango for the other one. Three major cities, Cianjur, Sukabumi, and Bogor, are located in the volcano complex at the east, south, and northwest, respectively, along with suburban growth. Seven craters are located in the complex: Baru, Gumuruh (2,927 m), Lanang (2,800 m), Kawah Leutik, Ratu (2,800 m), Sela (2,709 m) and Wadon (2,600 m). Historical volcanic activity has been recorded since the 16th century. With the amalgamation and growth of Greater Jakarta with those 3 cities, dense suburban growth has engulfed the fringes of the volcano, home to roughly 4 million people. Though not listed as one of the Decade Volcanoes or thought to produce large volcanic eruptions, the huge populations nearby give a potential for severe destruction if indeed a large eruption did occur.

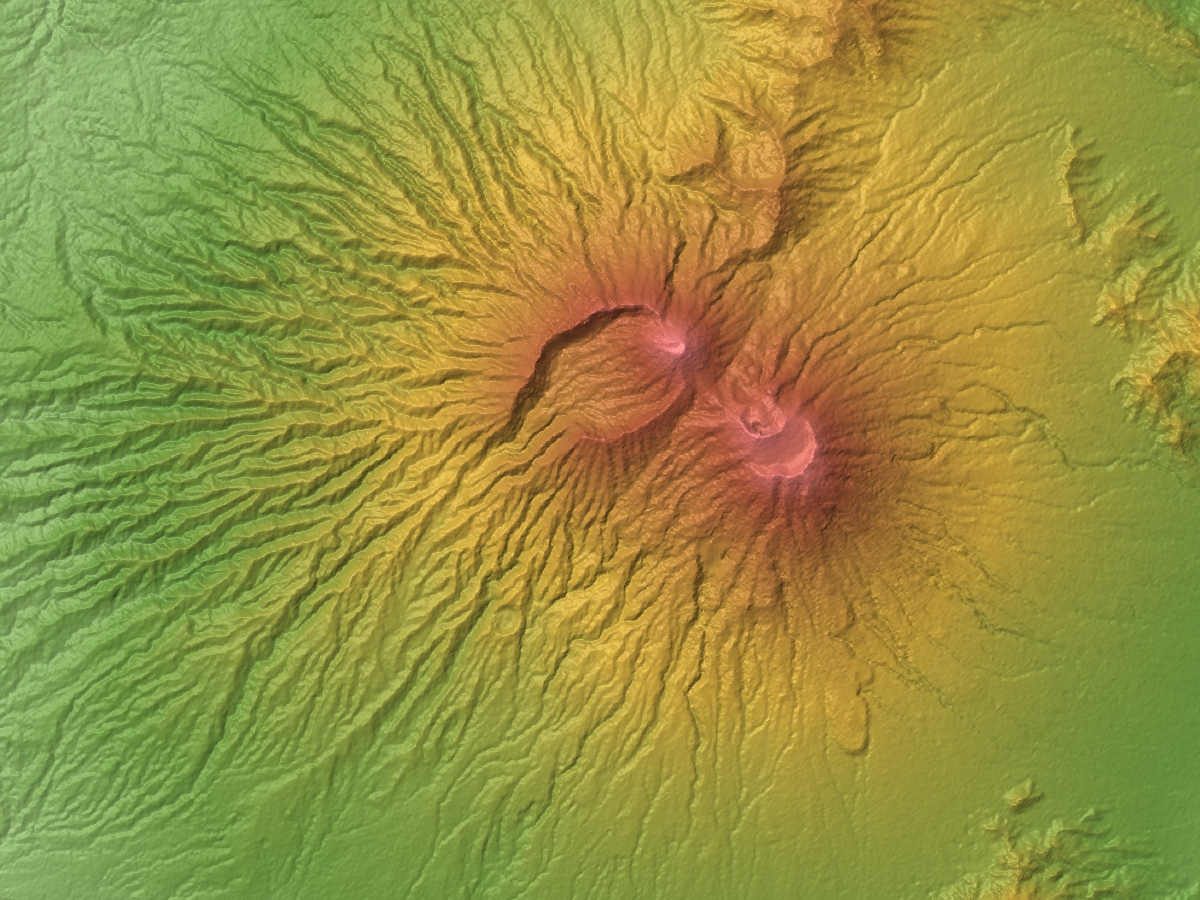
Relief Map

== See also ==
Media related to Mount Gede at Wikimedia Commons

- Gunung Padang Megalithic Site
- Gunung Gede Pangrango National Park
- List of volcanoes in Indonesia
- Citarik Fault
