= List of viverrids =

Species in the mammal family Viverridae

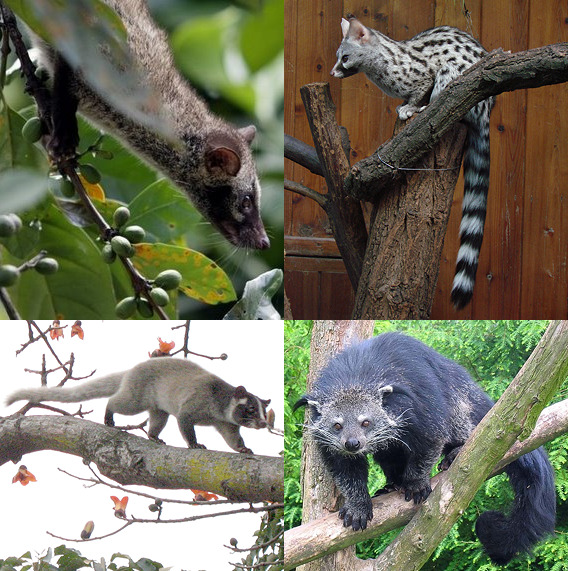
Four viverrid species (clockwise from top left): the Asian palm civet (Paradoxurus hermaphroditus), the common genet (Genetta genetta), the binturong (Arctictis binturong), and the masked palm civet (Paguma larvata)

Viverridae is a family of mammals in the order Carnivora, composed mainly of the civets and genets. A member of this family is called a viverrid. They are widespread primarily throughout Africa, India, and southeast Asia, and are found primarily in forests, shrublands, and grasslands, though some species can be found in savannas or wetlands. Most viverrids are 40 to 65 cm (16 to 26 in) long, plus a 35 to 60 cm (14 to 24 in) tail, though the West African oyan can be as small as 30 cm (12 in) plus a 35 cm (14 in) tail, and some binturongs can be up to 96 cm (38 in) plus a 89 cm (35 in) tail. Most species do not have population estimates, though three viverrids are classified as endangered, and one, the Malabar large-spotted civet, is classified as critically endangered with a population size of around 200. No viverrid species have been domesticated.

The thirty-three extant species of Viverridae are split into fourteen genera within four subfamilies: the three civet subfamilies Viverrinae, Hemigalinae, and Paradoxurinae, and the genet subfamily Genettinae. A fifth subfamily, Prionodontinae, was previously included in Viverridae, while the species in Genettinae were considered part of Viverrinae, but more recent genetic evidence resulted in the consensus to separate Prionodontinae into its own family and split out Genettinae into its own subfamily. Extinct species have also been placed into Viverrinae, as well as the extinct subfamily Lophocyoninae, though most extinct species have not been categorized into a subfamily. Nearly twenty extinct Viverridae species have been discovered, though due to ongoing research and discoveries the exact number and categorization is not fixed.

== Conventions ==
IUCN Red List categories
Conservation status
- EX: Extinct (0 species)
- EW: Extinct in the wild (0 species)
- CR: Critically endangered (1 species)
- EN: Endangered (3 species)
- VU: Vulnerable (6 species)
- NT: Near threatened (3 species)
- LC: Least concern (18 species)

Other categories
- DD: Data deficient (2 species)
- NE: Not evaluated (0 species)

The author citation for the species or genus is given after the scientific name; parentheses around the author citation indicate that this was not the original taxonomic placement. Conservation status codes listed follow the International Union for Conservation of Nature (IUCN) Red List of Threatened Species. Range maps are provided wherever possible; if a range map is not available, a description of the viverrid's range is provided. Ranges are based on the IUCN Red List for that species unless otherwise noted.

== Classification ==
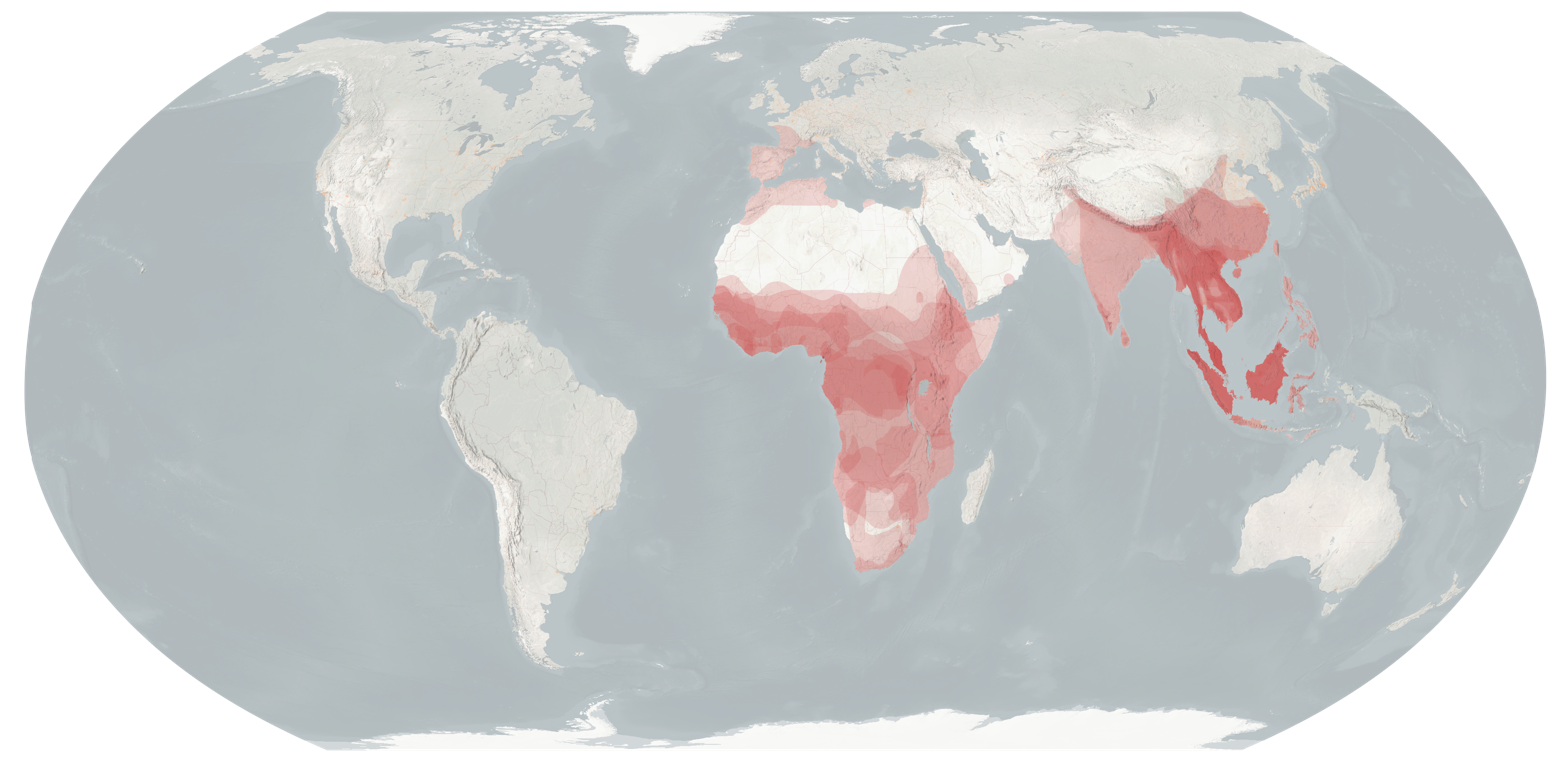
Viverridae distribution

The family Viverridae consists of 33 extant species belonging to 14 genera in 4 subfamilies and divided into dozens of extant subspecies. This does not include hybrid species or extinct prehistoric species.

- Subfamily Genettinae
  - Genus Genetta: fourteen species
  - Genus Poiana: two species
- Subfamily Hemigalinae
  - Genus Chrotogale: one species
  - Genus Cynogale: one species
  - Genus Diplogale: one species
  - Genus Hemigalus: one species
- Subfamily Paradoxurinae
  - Genus Arctictis: one species
  - Genus Arctogalidia: one species
  - Genus Macrogalidia: one species
  - Genus Paguma: one species
  - Genus Paradoxurus: three species
- Subfamily Viverrinae
  - Genus Civettictis: one species
  - Genus Viverra: four species
  - Genus Viverricula: one species

- Viverridae
  - - Paradoxurinae
      - - - - Paradoxurus
            - Macrogalidia
          - Paguma
        - Arctictis
      - Arctogalidia
    - Hemigalinae
      - Cynogale
      - - Chrotogale
        - - Diplogale
          - Hemigalus
  - - Viverrinae
      - - Viverra
        - Civettictis
      - Viverricula
    - Genettinae
      - Poiana
      - Genetta

== Viverrids ==
The following classification is based on the taxonomy described by Mammal Species of the World (2005), with augmentation by generally accepted proposals made since using molecular phylogenetic analysis. This includes the promotion of the Prionodontinae subfamily into its own family, and the moving of the Poiana and Genetta genera out of the Viverrinae subfamily into their own Genettinae subfamily. There are several additional proposals which are disputed, such as splitting the golden palm civet into three species or adding three additional species to Genetta, which are not included here.

=== Subfamily Genettinae ===
Genus Genetta – Cuvier, 1816 – fourteen species
Common name	Scientific name and subspecies	Range	Size and ecology	IUCN status and estimated population
Abyssinian genet	G. abyssinica (Rüppell, 1836)	Northeast Africa	Size: 40–43 cm (16–17 in) long, plus 38–41 cm (15–16 in) tail Habitat: Forest, shrubland, and grassland Diet: Primarily eats rodents, birds, and seeds, as well as insects and fruit	DD Unknown
Angolan genet	G. angolensis Bocage, 1882	Scattered south-central Africa	Size: 44–48 cm (17–19 in) long, plus 38–43 cm (15–17 in) tail Habitat: Savanna Diet: Believed to primarily eat insects, as well as fruit	LC Unknown
Aquatic genet	G. piscivora (Allen, 1919)	Central Africa	Size: 44–50 cm (17–20 in) long, plus 34–42 cm (13–17 in) tail Habitat: Forest and inland wetlands Diet: Primarily eats fish	NT 10,000
Bourlon's genet	G. bourloni Gaubert, 2003	West Africa	Size: 49–50 cm (19–20 in) long, plus 40–42 cm (16–17 in) tail Habitat: Forest Diet: Unknown	VU 9,800
Cape genet	G. tigrina (Schreber, 1776) Two subspecies: G. t. methi; G. t. tigrina	South Africa	Size: 42–58 cm (17–23 in) long, plus 38–46 cm (15–18 in) tail Habitat: Forest, shrubland, and grassland Diet: Omnivorous; primarily eats insects and small mammals	LC Unknown
Common genet	G. genetta (Linnaeus, 1758) Five subspecies: G. g. afra; G. g. dongolana; G. g. felina; G. g. genetta; G. g. senegalensis	Bands of north, central, and south Africa and parts of Arabian peninsula (green), introduced in southwest Europe (red), formerly introduced in Nile river area (black)	Size: 46–52 cm (18–20 in) long, plus 42–52 cm (17–20 in) tail Habitat: Forest, savanna, shrubland, and rocky areas Diet: Primarily eats small mammals, as well as birds, other small vertebrates, insects, and fruit	LC Unknown
Crested servaline genet	G. cristata Hayman, 1940	Northwest Africa	Size: 49–63 cm (19–25 in) long, plus 43 cm (17 in) tail Habitat: Forest Diet: Primarily eats insects, as well as small mammals, reptiles, and vegetables	VU 7,000
Giant forest genet	G. victoriae Thomas, 1902	Central Africa	Size: 55–60 cm (22–24 in) long, plus 41–49 cm (16–19 in) tail Habitat: Forest Diet: Primarily eats fruit, as well as rodents, birds, and insects	LC Unknown
Hausa genet	G. thierryi Matschie, 1902	West Africa	Size: 44–45 cm (17–18 in) long, plus 40–43 cm (16–17 in) tail Habitat: Forest, savanna, and shrubland Diet: Unknown	LC Unknown
Johnston's genet	G. johnstoni Pocock, 1908	Northwest Africa	Size: 47–52 cm (19–20 in) long, plus 46–50 cm (18–20 in) tail Habitat: Forest, savanna, and shrubland Diet: Believed to primarily eat insects	NT Unknown
King genet	G. poensis Waterhouse, 1838	Scattered parts of west Africa	Size: 42–68 cm (17–27 in) long, plus 35–47 cm (14–19 in) tail Habitat: Forest Diet: Unknown; believed to eat mammals and fruit	DD Unknown
Pardine genet	G. pardina Geoffroy, 1832	Northwest Africa	Size: 41–56 cm (16–22 in) long, plus 39–45 cm (15–18 in) tail Habitat: Forest, savanna, and shrubland Diet: Primarily eats rodents, as well as insects, fruit, birds, and other small mammals	LC Unknown
Rusty-spotted genet	G. maculata (Gray, 1830)	Central and south Africa	Size: 41–53 cm (16–21 in) long, plus 39–54 cm (15–21 in) tail Habitat: Forest, savanna, and shrubland Diet: Primarily eats invertebrates, fish, amphibians, reptiles, small birds, eggs, and small mammals, as well as fruit, seeds, and berries	LC Unknown
Servaline genet	G. servalina Pucheran, 1855 Five subspecies: G. s. archeri (Zanzibar servaline genet); G. s. bettoni; G. s. lowei; G. s. schwarzi; G. s. servalina	Central africa	Size: 44–51 cm (17–20 in) long, plus 36–49 cm (14–19 in) tail Habitat: Forest and shrubland Diet: Primarily eats small mammals and insects, as well as snakes, birds, and fruit	LC Unknown

Genus Poiana – Gray, 1865 – two species
Common name	Scientific name and subspecies	Range	Size and ecology	IUCN status and estimated population
Central African oyan	P. richardsonii (Thomson, 1842) Two subspecies: P. r. ochracea; P. r. richardsonii	Central Africa	Size: 33–38 cm (13–15 in) long, plus 35–40 cm (14–16 in) tail Habitat: Forest Diet: Believed to eat small vertebrates and invertebrates	LC Unknown
West African oyan	P. leightoni Pocock, 1908	West Africa	Size: 30–38 cm (12–15 in) long, plus 35–40 cm (14–16 in) tail Habitat: Forest Diet: Believed to eat small vertebrates and invertebrates	VU 6,700-10,000

=== Subfamily Hemigalinae ===
Genus Chrotogale – Thomas, 1912 – one species
Common name	Scientific name and subspecies	Range	Size and ecology	IUCN status and estimated population
Owston's palm civet	C. owstoni Thomas, 1912	Southeast Asia around Vietnam	Size: 51–63 cm (20–25 in) long, plus 38–48 cm (15–19 in) tail Habitat: Forest and shrubland Diet: Believed to primarily eat earthworms and other invertebrates	EN Unknown

Genus Cynogale – Gray, 1837 – one species
Common name	Scientific name and subspecies	Range	Size and ecology	IUCN status and estimated population
Otter civet	C. bennettii (Gray, 1837) Two subspecies: C. b. bennettii; C. b. lowei	Southeast Asia	Size: 57–68 cm (22–27 in) long, plus 12–21 cm (5–8 in) tail Habitat: Forest and inland wetlands Diet: Primarily eats fish, crabs, molluscs, small mammals, and birds	EN 2,500

Genus Diplogale – Thomas, 1912 – one species
Common name	Scientific name and subspecies	Range	Size and ecology	IUCN status and estimated population
Hose's palm civet	D. hosei Thomas, 1892	Borneo in Southeast Asia	Size: 47–54 cm (19–21 in) long, plus 29–34 cm (11–13 in) tail Habitat: Forest Diet: Believed to primarily eat small fish, shrimp, crabs, and frogs as well as insects	VU 9,500

Genus Hemigalus – Jourdan, 1837 – one species
Common name	Scientific name and subspecies	Range	Size and ecology	IUCN status and estimated population
Banded palm civet	H. derbyanus (Gray, 1837) Four subspecies: H. d. boiei; H. d. derbyanus; H. d. minor; H. d. sipora	Southeast Asia	Size: 45–56 cm (18–22 in) long, plus 25–36 cm (10–14 in) tail Habitat: Forest Diet: Primarily eats insects	NT Unknown

=== Subfamily Paradoxurinae ===
Genus Arctictis – Temminck, 1824 – one species
Common name	Scientific name and subspecies	Range	Size and ecology	IUCN status and estimated population
Binturong	A. binturong (Raffles, 1821) Six subspecies: A. b. albifrons; A. b. binturong; A. b. kerkhoveni; A. b. menglaensis; A. b. penicillatus; A. b. whitei (Palawan binturong)	Southeast Asia	Size: 61–96 cm (24–38 in) long, plus 56–89 cm (22–35 in) tail Habitat: Forest Diet: Primarily eats fruit	VU Unknown

Genus Arctogalidia – Merriam, 1897 – one species
Common name	Scientific name and subspecies	Range	Size and ecology	IUCN status and estimated population
Small-toothed palm civet	A. trivirgata (Gray, 1832) Fourteen subspecies: A. t. bancana; A. t. fusca; A. t. inornata; A. t. leucotis; A. t. macra; A. t. major; A. t. millsi; A. t. minor; A. t. simplex; A. t. stigmaticus; A. t. sumatrana; A. t. tingia; A. t. trilineata; A. t. trivirgata	Southeast Asia	Size: 44–60 cm (17–24 in) long, plus 48–66 cm (19–26 in) tail Habitat: Forest Diet: Omnivorous; primarily eats fruit	LC Unknown

Genus Macrogalidia – Schwarz, 1910 – one species
Common name	Scientific name and subspecies	Range	Size and ecology	IUCN status and estimated population
Sulawesi palm civet	M. musschenbroekii (Schlegel, 1877)	Sulawesi island in Southeast Asia	Size: 65–72 cm (26–28 in) long, plus 44–54 cm (17–21 in) tail Habitat: Forest, shrubland, and grassland Diet: Primarily eats rodents and palm fruit, as well as other small mammals, birds, fruit, and grass	VU 9,000

Genus Paguma – Gray, 1831 – one species
Common name	Scientific name and subspecies	Range	Size and ecology	IUCN status and estimated population
Masked palm civet	P. larvata (H. Smith, 1827) Sixteen subspecies: P. l. chichingensis; P. l. grayi; P. l. hainana; P. l. intrudens; P. l. janetta; P. l. jourdanii; P. l. lanigera; P. l. larvata; P. l. leucomystax; P. l. neglecta; P. l. nigriceps; P. l. ogilbyi; P. l. robusta; P. l. taivana; P. l. tytlerii; P. l. wroughtoni	East and southeast Asia	Size: 50–76 cm (20–30 in) long, plus 50–64 cm (20–25 in) tail Habitat: Forest and shrubland Diet: Omnivorous; primarily eats fruit	LC Unknown

Genus Paradoxurus – F. Cuvier, 1821 – three species
Common name	Scientific name and subspecies	Range	Size and ecology	IUCN status and estimated population
Asian palm civet	P. hermaphroditus (Pallas, 1777) 30 subspecies: P. h. balicus; P. h. bondar; P. h. canescens; P. h. canus; P. h. cochinensis; P. h. dongfangensis; P. h. enganus; P. h. exitus; P. h. hermaphroditus; P. h. javanica; P. h. kangeanus; P. h. laotum; P. h. lignicolor; P. h. milleri; P. h. minor; P. h. musanga; P. h. nictitans; P. h. pallasii; P. h. pallens; P. h. parvus; P. h. philippinensis; P. h. pugnax; P. h. pulcher; P. h. sacer; P. h. scindiae; P. h. senex; P. h. setosus; P. h. simplex; P. h. sumbanus; P. h. vellerosus	South and southeast Asia (green), introduced (red)	Size: 47–57 cm (19–22 in) long, plus 47–56 cm (19–22 in) tail Habitat: Forest, shrubland, and grassland Diet: Primarily eats rats and fruit, as well as insects and molluscs	LC Unknown
Brown palm civet	P. jerdoni Blanford, 1885 Two subspecies: P. j. caniscus; P. j. jerdoni	Southwest India	Size: 43–62 cm (17–24 in) long, plus 38–53 cm (15–21 in) tail Habitat: Forest Diet: Primarily eats fruit, as well as birds, rodents, and insects	LC Unknown
Golden palm civet	P. zeylonensis (Schreber, 1778)	Sri Lanka	Size: 50–58 cm (20–23 in) long, plus 43–53 cm (17–21 in) tail Habitat: Forest and shrubland Diet: Primarily eats berries, fruits, and invertebrates, as well as small vertebrates	LC Unknown

=== Subfamily Viverrinae ===
Genus Civettictis – Pocock, 1915 – one species
Common name	Scientific name and subspecies	Range	Size and ecology	IUCN status and estimated population
African civet	C. civetta (Schreber, 1776) Six subspecies: C. c. australis; C. c. civetta; C. c. congica; C. c. pauli; C. c. schwarzi; C. c. volkmanni	Central and south Africa	Size: 60–92 cm (24–36 in) long, plus 43–61 cm (17–24 in) tail Habitat: Forest, savanna, shrubland, and inland wetlands Diet: Omnivorous; primarily eats fruit	LC Unknown

Genus Viverra – Linnaeus, 1758 – four species
Common name	Scientific name and subspecies	Range	Size and ecology	IUCN status and estimated population
Large-spotted civet	V. megaspila Blyth, 1862	Southeast Asia	Size: 77–90 cm (30–35 in) long, plus 32–40 cm (13–16 in) tail Habitat: Forest, shrubland, and inland wetlands Diet: Primarily eats birds, frogs, snakes, small mammals, eggs, crabs, fish, fruit, and roots	EN Unknown
Large Indian civet	V. zibetha Linnaeus, 1758 Five subspecies: V. z. ashtoni; V. z. hainana; V. z. picta; V. z. pruinosus; V. z. zibetha	Southeast Asia	Size: 50–95 cm (20–37 in) long, plus 38–59 cm (15–23 in) tail Habitat: Forest and shrubland Diet: Primarily eats fish, birds, lizards, frogs, insects, arthropods, and crabs, as well as poultry and rubbish	LC Unknown
Malabar large-spotted civet	V. civettina Blyth, 1862	Southwest India	Size: 76 cm (30 in) long, plus 33 cm (13 in) tail Habitat: Forest and inland wetlands Diet: Unknown	CR 200
Malayan civet	V. tangalunga Gray, 1832 Two subspecies: V. t. lankavensis; V. t. tangalunga	Southeast Asia	Size: 58–95 cm (23–37 in) long, plus 30–49 cm (12–19 in) tail Habitat: Forest and shrubland Diet: Omnivorous	LC Unknown

Genus Viverricula – Hodgson, 1838 – one species
Common name	Scientific name and subspecies	Range	Size and ecology	IUCN status and estimated population
Small Indian civet	V. indica (Desmarest, 1804) Twelve subspecies: V. i. atchinensis; V. i. baliensis; V. i. baptistae; V. i. deserti; V. i. indica; V. i. klossi; V. i. mayori; V. i. muriavensis; V. i. pallida; V. i. schlegelii; V. i. thai; V. i. wellsi	South and southeast Asia	Size: 45–63 cm (18–25 in) long, plus 30–43 cm (12–17 in) tail Habitat: Forest, savanna, shrubland, grassland, and inland wetlands Diet: Primarily eats rodents, birds, snakes, fruit, roots, carrion, and insects	LC Unknown
