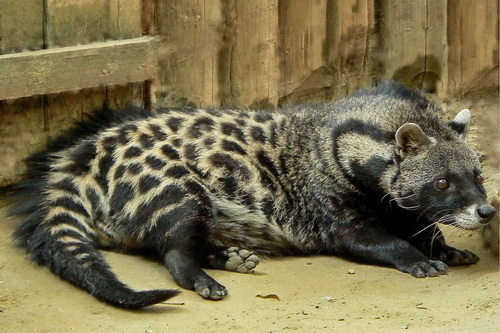
- African civet (Civettictis civetta)

Scientific classification
- Kingdom: Animalia
- Phylum: Chordata
- Class: Mammalia
- Order: Carnivora
- Suborder: Feliformia

Groups included
- Nandiniidae; Viverrinae; Hemigalinae; Paradoxurus; Paguma; Arctogalidia; Fossa

Cladistically included but traditionally excluded taxa
- Prionodontidae; Felidae; Genettinae; Arctictis; Hyaenidae; Herpestidae; Eupleres; Cryptoprocta; Galidiinae

= Civet =

Civets

Mammals of the families Viverridae and Nandiniidae and the genus Fossa

A civet (/ˈsɪvɪt/) is a small, lean, mostly nocturnal mammal native to tropical Asia and Africa, especially the tropical forests. The term civet applies to over a dozen different species, mostly from the family Viverridae. Most of the diversity of species is found in southeast Asia. Animals bearing the name "civet" do not form a monophyletic group, as they include members of both the Viverridae and Eupleridae, the latter being not technically civets. The common name "civet cat," applied in popular usage to a variety of animals including actual civets, is inaccurate as a civet is not a form of cat.

The African civet, Civettictis civetta, has historically been the main species from which a musky scent used in perfumery, also referred to as "civet", was obtained.

== Naming ==
The common name is used for a variety of carnivoran mammal species, primarily of the family Viverridae. It also refers to the African palm civet and the Malagasy civet.

The African palm civet (Nandinia binotata) is genetically distinct and belongs in its own monotypic family, Nandiniidae.

The Malagasy civet (Fossa fossana) belongs to a separate family Eupleridae, with other carnivorans of Madagascar. The Malagasy civet was to be placed in the subfamily Hemigalinae with the banded palm civets and then in its own subfamily, Fossinae, because of similarities with others in the group pointed out by Gregory, but it is now classified as a member of the subfamily Euplerinae, after Pocock pointed out more similarities with that one.

Civets are also called toddy cats in English, marapaṭṭi (മരപട്ടി) in Malayalam, musang in Malay, Filipino, and Indonesian, and urulǣvā (උරුලෑවා) in Sinhalese. There can be confusion among speakers of Malay because the indigenous word musang has been mistakenly applied to foxes by printed media instead of rubah, which is the correct but lesser-known term.

A minority of writers use civet to refer only to Civettictis, Viverra and Viverricula civets. However, in more common usage in English, the name also covers the civets of the viverrid genera Chrotogale, Cynogale, Diplogale, Hemigalus, Arctogalidia, Macrogalidia, Paguma and Paradoxurus.

=== South Asia ===
In Sri Lanka, the Asian palm civet, Small indian civet and Golden palm civet species is known as "uguduwa" by the Sinhala-speaking community. The terms uguduwa and kalawedda are used interchangeably by the Sri Lankan community to refer to the same animal. However, the term kalawedda is mostly used to refer to another species in the civet family, the Golden palm civet.

Sri Lanka also has an endemic civet species called golden palm civet. Recently this species was split into three separate endemic species as Paradoxurus montanus, P. aureus, and P. stenocephalus. In Bangladesh and Bengali-speaking areas of India, civets are known as "khatash" (Bengali: খাটাশ) for the smaller species and "bagdash" (Bengali: বাগডাশ) for the larger ones and is now extremely rare in Bangladesh (in the Khulna area of the country, the animal is also known as "shairel"). In Assamese this animal is known as "zohamola" (Assamese: জহামলা) which literally means "to have zoha aromatic feces". In Maharashtra Marathi-speaking areas of India, civets are known as "Udmanjar" (Marathi: उदमांजर).

In Kerala, the Malayalam speaking areas of India, the small Indian civet (Viverricula indica) is called "veruk" (വെരുക്‌). In adjoining coastal regions of Karnataka it is called 'beru'/ಬೆರು in kannada as also Tulu. 'Veruku' (வெருகு) in Tamil meant 'cat', particularly during the Sangam period (c. 100 BCE to 400 CE).

== Physical characteristics ==
Civets have a broadly cat-like general appearance, though the muzzle is extended and often pointed, rather like that of an otter, mongoose or ferret. They range in length (excluding the tail) from around 43 to 71 cm (17 to 28 in) and in weight from around 1.4 to 4.5 kg (3 to 10 lb).

The civet produces a musk (named civet after the animal) which is highly valued as a fragrance and stabilizing agent for perfume. Both male and female civets produce the strong-smelling secretion, which is produced by the civet's perineal glands. It is harvested by either killing the animal and removing the glands, or by scraping the secretions from the glands of a live animal. The latter is the preferred method today.

Animal rights groups, such as World Animal Protection, express concern that harvesting musk is cruel to animals. Between these ethical concerns and the availability of synthetic substitutes, the practice of raising civets for musk is dying out.

== Habitat ==
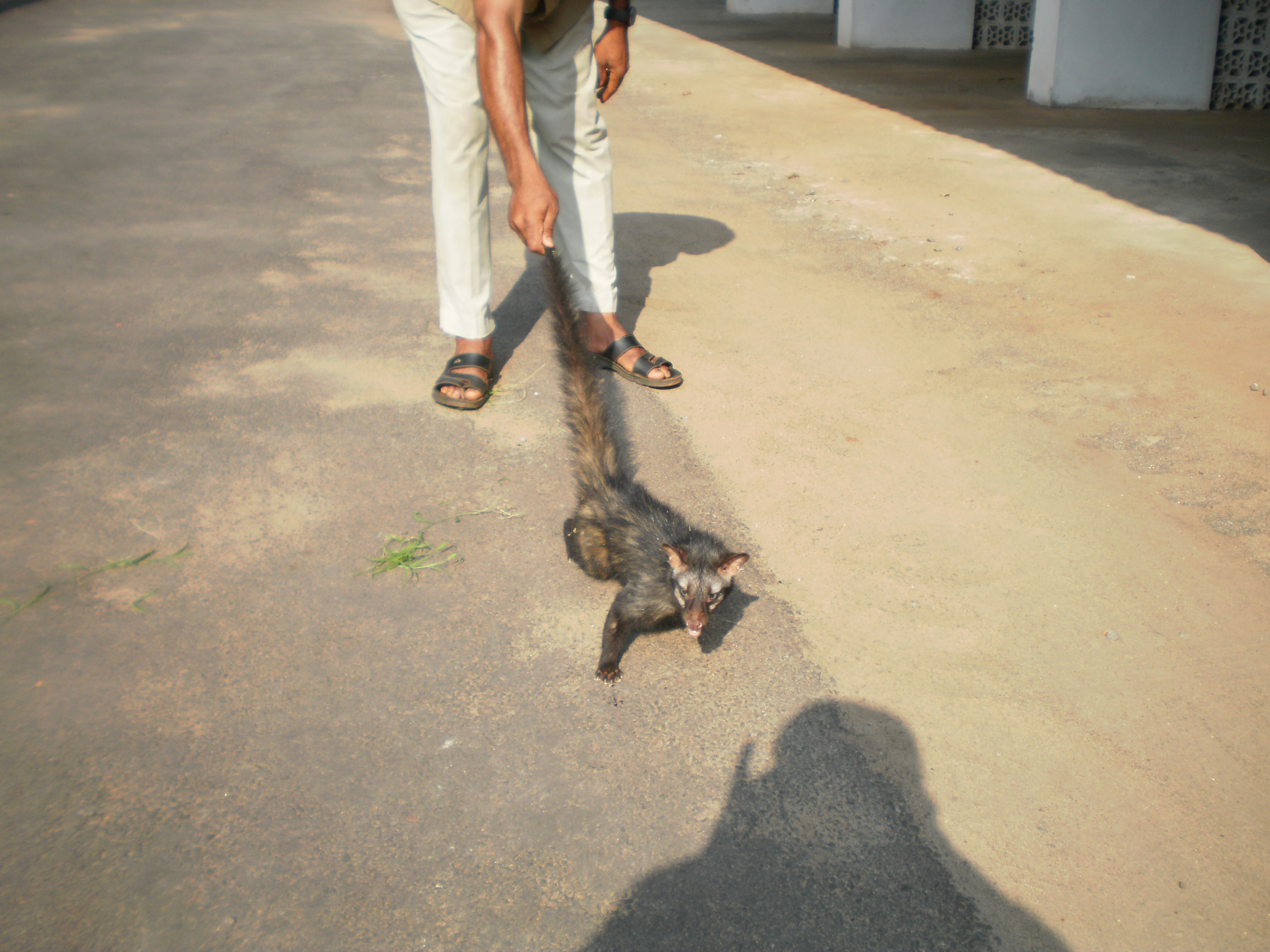
A captured civet in India

Viverrids are native to sub-Saharan Africa, Madagascar, the Iberian Peninsula, southern China, South and Southeast Asia. Favoured habitats include woodland, savanna, and mountain biome. In consequence, many are faced with severe loss of habitat; several species are considered vulnerable and the otter civet is classified as endangered. Some species of civet are very rare and elusive and hardly anything is known about them, e.g., the Hose's civet, endemic to the montane forests of northern Borneo, is one of the world's least known carnivores.

== Diet ==
Civets are unusual among feliforms, and carnivora in general, in that they are omnivores or even herbivores. Many species primarily eat fruit. Some also use flower nectar as a major source of energy. As human habitats have increased and expanded, civets have preyed on livestock and smaller domesticated animals, such as fowls, ducks, rabbits, and cats.

=== Coffee ===
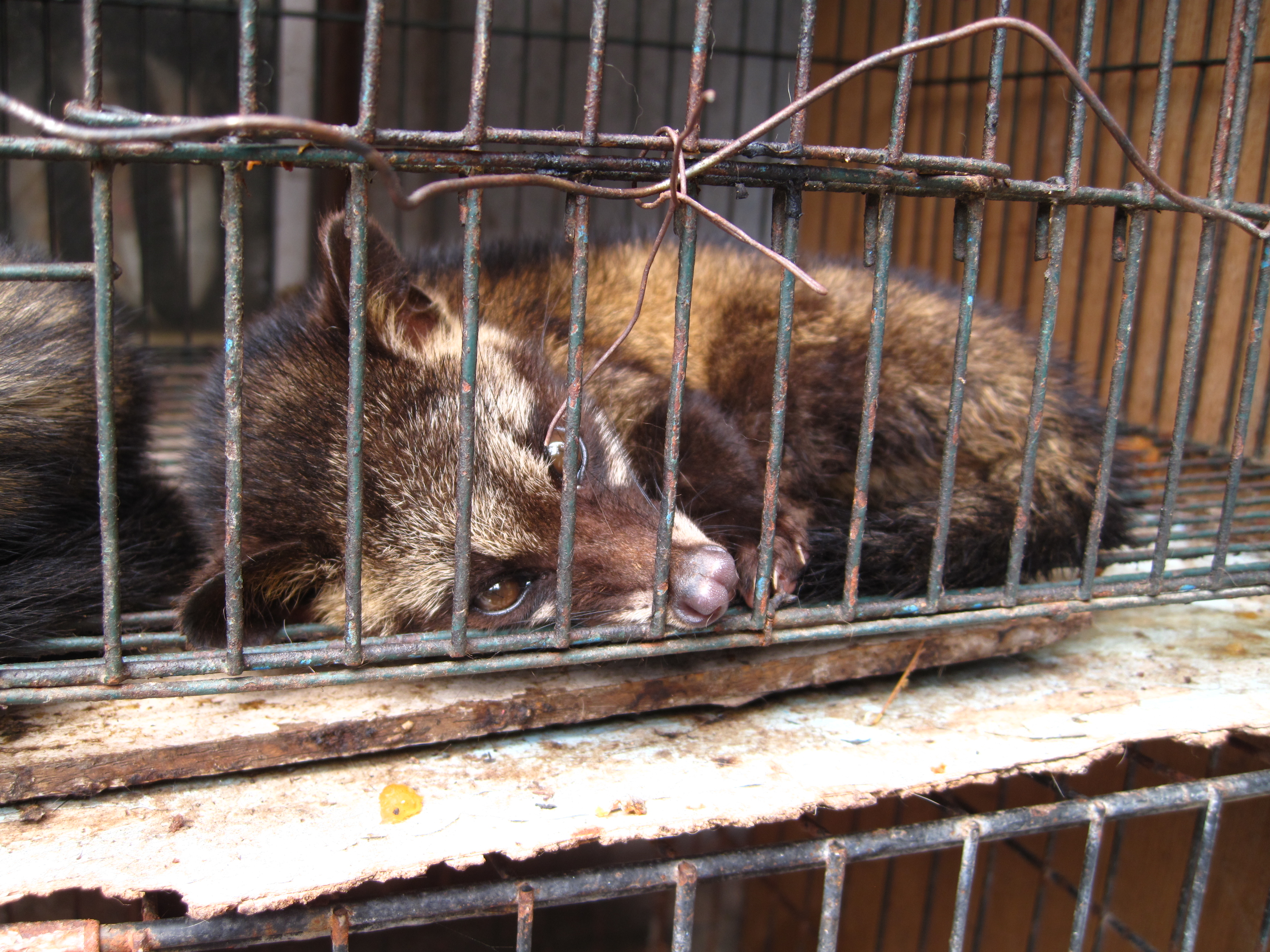
A caged civet

Kopi luwak, (called cà phê cứt chồn in Vietnam and Tagalog: kape alamid in the Philippines) is coffee that is prepared using coffee cherries that have been eaten and partly digested by the Asian palm civet and then harvested from its fecal matter.

The civets digest the flesh of the coffee cherries but pass the beans inside, where stomach enzymes affect the beans. This adds to the coffee's prized aroma and flavor. About 0.5 kg (1 lb) can cost up to $600 in some parts of the world and about $100 a cup in others.

This demand has led to civet farms on which the civets are fed a diet composed almost exclusively of such cherries, causing them to become severely malnourished. Farm conditions are also routinely described as deplorable. Filipino and Vietnamese oversight of these farms is nonexistent.

== Relationship with humans ==
The Malayan civet is found in many habitats, including forests, secondary habitats, cultivated land, and the outskirts of villages; the species is highly adaptable to human disturbances, including "selective logging" (partial forest removal).

African civets (Civettictis civetta) are listed as Least Concern. However, in certain regions of Africa, the population is declining; this is due to hunting, direct and indirect poisoning, and an increase in large-scale farm fences that limit population flow. They are also seen as comparatively abundant options in the bushmeat trade.

Masked palm civets sold for meat in local markets of Yunnan China, carried the SARS virus from horseshoe bats to humans; this resulted in the 2002–2004 SARS outbreak.

Civets are also raised in captivity by humans for two reasons. In Asia, they are raised to process coffee beans. In Ethiopia, they are raised in captivity to collect their perineal secretions, also called civet, to be used in making perfume.

=== Urban environments ===
Palm civets often venture into cities and suburbs, with people often complaining about civet faeces and the noise of the animals' climbing on roofs. Some studies have been undertaken to examine and mitigate such human–animal conflict.

=== Literature ===
In William Shakespeare's As You Like It, act II, scene 2, the “civet cat” is mentioned as the "uncleanly" source of courtiers' perfumes. This presumably refers to the musk of actual civets, and if so is an early example of miscalling a civet a cat, which it is not.
