= Ugandictis =

Ugandictis Temporal range: Burdigalian

Scientific classification
- Kingdom: Animalia
- Phylum: Chordata
- Class: Mammalia
- Order: Carnivora
- Family: Herpestidae
- Genus: †Ugandictis
- Species: †U. napakensis

Binomial name
- †Ugandictis napakensis Morales et al., 2007

Extinct genus of viverrid mammal

Ugandictis is an extinct monotypic genus of viverrid mammal that lived in Africa during the Burdigalian stage of the Miocene epoch.

== Description ==
Ugandictis was a small viverrid. Its M_{1} had a V-shaped trigonid and a large metaconid. The hypoconulid and entoconid were subdivided and the hypoconid was strongly developed. Its P^{4} had a short metastyle that formed a sharp blade, a parastyle that was similar in size to the metastyle, and a protocone that was dune-shaped and located in front of the metastyle.
