= Megaviverra =

Scientific classification
- Kingdom: Animalia
- Phylum: Chordata
- Class: Mammalia
- Order: Carnivora
- Family: Viverridae
- Genus: †Megaviverra; Qiu, 1980

Extinct genus of mammals

Megaviverra is an extinct genus of viverrid that lived during the Neogene and Quaternary periods.

== Distribution ==
The species M. carpathorum is known from Pliocene sites in Poland. M. pleistocenicus is known from Early Pleistocene deposits in China.
