= Kanuites =

Kanuites Temporal range: Miocene

Scientific classification
- Kingdom: Animalia
- Phylum: Chordata
- Class: Mammalia
- Order: Carnivora
- Family: Viverridae
- Genus: †Kanuites; Dehghani & Werdelin, 2008

Type species
- †Kanuites lewisae Dehghani & Werdelin, 2008

Extinct genus of carnivores

Kanuites is an extinct genus of paradoxurine viverrid carnivore. It lived in Africa, during the Miocene epoch.

== Description ==
Kanuites was about 90 centimetres (3 ft) long, and looked remarkably similar to modern genets. Kanuites was probably an omnivore and may have had retractable claws, like a feline. It may have lived at least part of its life in trees.
