= Semigenetta =

Semigenetta Temporal range: Langhian–Tortonian

Scientific classification
- Kingdom: Animalia
- Phylum: Chordata
- Class: Mammalia
- Order: Carnivora
- Family: Viverridae
- Subfamily: Viverrinae
- Genus: †Semigenetta

Type species
- †Semigenetta repelini Helbing, 1927

Species
- †S. cadeoti Roman and Viret 1934; †S. elegans Dehm, 1950; †S. grandis Crusafont & Golpe, 1981; †S. laugnacensis De Bonis, 1973; †S. qiae Wang et al., 2024; †S. ripolli Petter, 1976; †S. sansaniensis Lartet, 1851; †S. thailandica Wang et al., 2024

Extinct genus of viverrid

Semigenetta is an extinct genus of viverrid. It lived in Europe, China, and Thailand in the Miocene, and was very similar to the extant genus Genetta, but lacked a molar that Genetta still possesses.

== Palaeoecology ==
At the Late Miocene site of Hammerschmiede, S. sansaniensis competed with "Martes" sansaniensis and with Alopecocyon goeriachensis and was the most hypercarnivorous out of the three.
