= Kichechia =

Kichechia Temporal range: Burdigalian

Scientific classification
- Kingdom: Animalia
- Phylum: Chordata
- Class: Mammalia
- Order: Carnivora
- Family: Viverridae
- Subfamily: Paradoxurinae
- Genus: †Kichechia; Savage, 1965

Type species
- Kichechia zamanae Savage, 1965

Other species
- Kichechia savagei Adrian et al. 2018

Extinct genus of

Kichechia is an extinct genus of paradoxurine carnivoran that lived in Africa during the Burdigalian stage of the Miocene epoch.

== Distribution ==
The species Kichechia savagei is known exclusively from Kenya, while the type species Kichechia zamanae has been found in both Kenya and Uganda.
