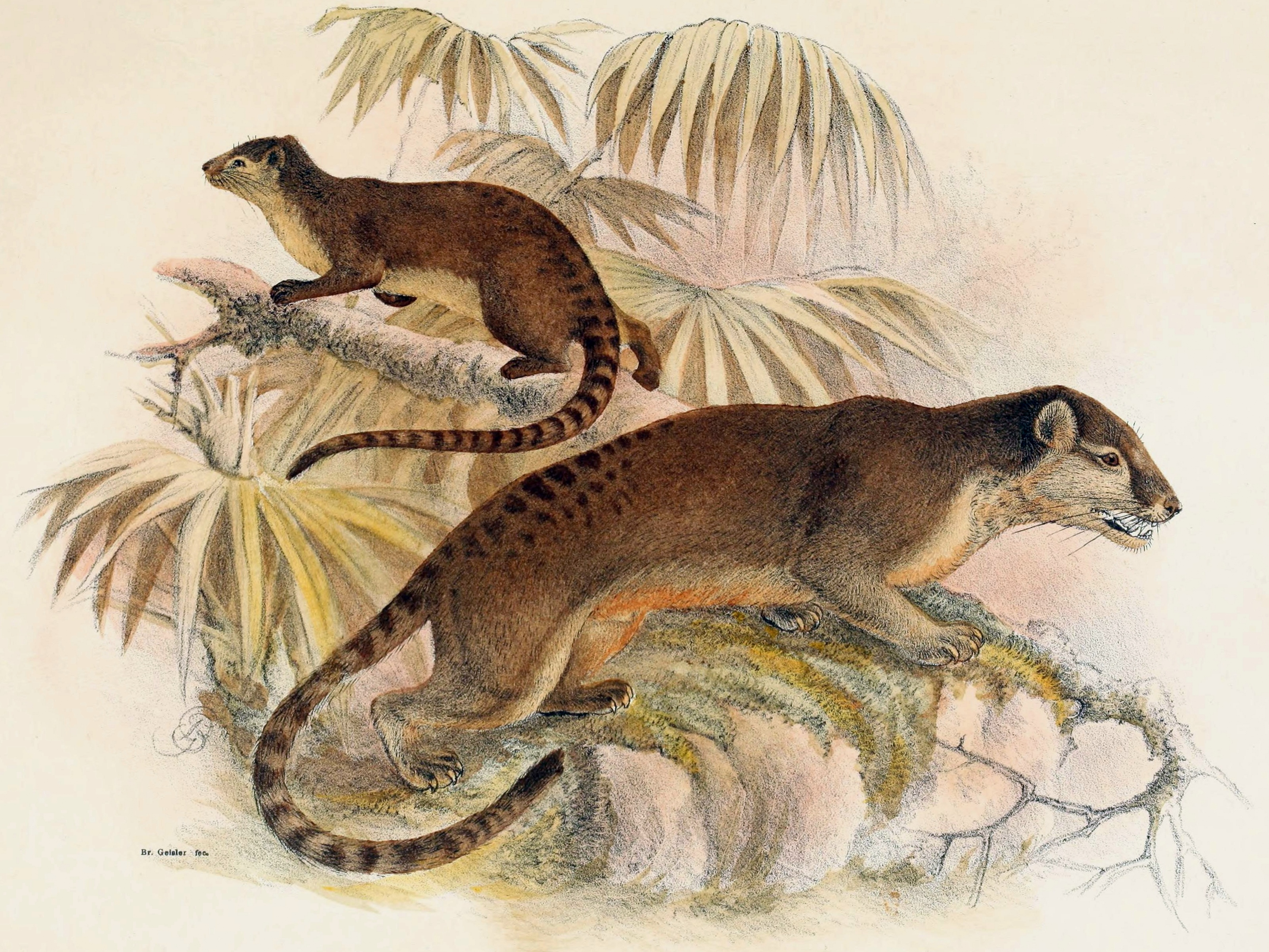

Conservation status
- Vulnerable (IUCN 3.1)

Scientific classification
- Kingdom: Animalia
- Phylum: Chordata
- Class: Mammalia
- Order: Carnivora
- Family: Viverridae
- Subfamily: Hemigalinae
- Genus: Macrogalidia; Schwarz, 1910
- Species: M. musschenbroekii

Binomial name
- Macrogalidia musschenbroekii (Schlegel, 1877)
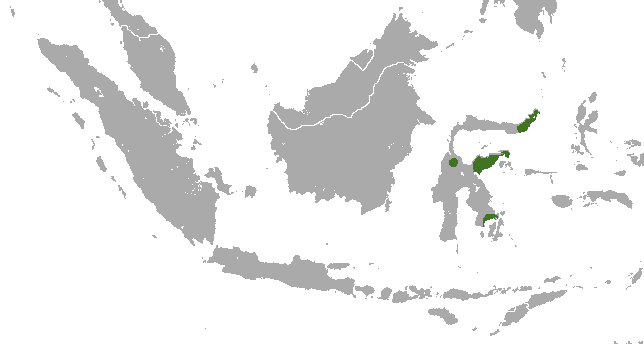
- Sulawesi palm civet range

= Sulawesi palm civet =

Species of carnivore

The Sulawesi palm civet (Macrogalidia musschenbroekii), also known as Sulawesi civet, musang and brown palm civet is a little-known viverrid endemic to Sulawesi. It is listed as Vulnerable on the IUCN Red List due to population decline estimated to have been more than 30% over the last three generations (suspected to be 15 years) inferred from habitat destruction and degradation.

Macrogalidia is a monospecific genus. It is the only carnivoran native to Sulawesi.

== Characteristics ==
The Sulawesi civet has a light brownish-chestnut coloured soft and short coat with numerous light hairs intermixed. The underparts vary from fulvous to white; the breast is rufescent. There is a pair of indistinct longitudinal stripes and some faint spots on the hinder part of the back. The whiskers are mixed brown and white. The tail is marked with alternating rings of dark and pale brown, which are indistinct on the under surface, and disappear towards the dark tip. The length of head and body is about 35 in (89 cm) with a 25 in (64 cm) long tail. The skull with the bony palate is much produced backwards, but otherwise resembles that of Asian palm civet (Paradoxurus hermaphroditus). The teeth differ from those of all the Paradoxurus species in that the two cheek-series run nearly parallel, in place of being widely divergent posteriorly.

== Distribution and habitat ==
Sulawesi palm civets were recorded in lowland forest, lower and upper montane forest at elevations up to 2,600 m (8,500 ft), grasslands and near farms. They appear to be more common in forests than in agricultural areas. Although they appear to be generalists that can probably tolerate some degree of disturbed habitat, there is no evidence that populations can survive independent of tall forest. Between September 2016 and April 2017, Sulawesi palm civets were recorded in Bogani Nani Wartabone National Park and in Tangkoko Batuangus Nature Reserve at elevations of 253–1,515 m (830–4,970 ft).

== Ecology and behaviour ==
Sulawesi palm civets are partially arboreal, apparently nocturnal, and omnivorous, feeding on small mammals, fruit and grass. They occasionally take birds and farm animals. Their home range is estimated at 150 ha (0.58 sq mi).
