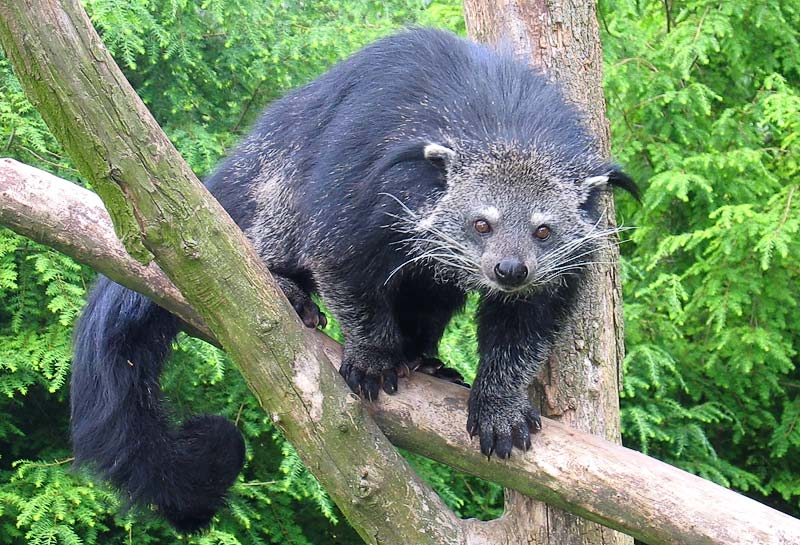
- Binturong (Arctictis binturong)

Scientific classification
- Kingdom: Animalia
- Phylum: Chordata
- Class: Mammalia
- Order: Carnivora
- Family: Viverridae
- Subfamily: Paradoxurinae; Gray, 1864

Genera
- see Classification

= Paradoxurinae =

Subfamily of carnivores

Paradoxurinae is a subfamily of the feliform viverrids that was denominated and first described by John Edward Gray in 1864. Pocock subordinated the genera Paradoxurus, Paguma and Arctictis to this subfamily.

== Classification ==
=== Living species ===
Genus	Species	IUCN Red List status and distribution
Paradoxurus Cuvier, 1822	Asian palm civet (P. hermaphroditus) (Pallas, 1777)	LC
Paradoxurus Cuvier, 1822	Golden palm civet (P. zeylonensis) (Pallas, 1778)	VU
Paradoxurus Cuvier, 1822	Brown palm civet (P. jerdoni) Blanford, 1885	LC
Arctictis Temminck, 1824	Binturong (A. binturong) (Raffles, 1822)	VU
Paguma Gray, 1831	Masked palm civet (P. larvata) (Smith, 1827)	LC
Arctogalidia Merriam, 1897	Small-toothed palm civet (A. trivirgata) (Gray, 1832)	LC

=== Phylogenetic tree ===
The phylogenetic relationships of Paradoxurinae as are shown in the following cladogram:

- Paradoxurinae
  - - - Paradoxurus
        - - Paradoxurus zeylonensis (Golden palm civet)
          - Paradoxurus jerdoni (Jerdon's palm civet)
        - Paradoxurus hermaphroditus (Asian palm civet)
      - Arctogalidia
        Arctogalidia trivirgata (Small-toothed palm civet)
    - Paguma
      Paguma larvata (Masked palm civet)
  - Arctictis
    Arctictis binturong (Binturong)

=== Extinct genera ===
- †Kichechia Savage, 1965
- †Tugenictis Morales & Pickford, 2005
- †Kanuites Dehghani & Werdelin, 2008
- †Siamictis Grohé et al., 2020
- †Mioparadoxurus Morales & Pickford, 2011
- †Parakichechia Abbas et al., 2026
