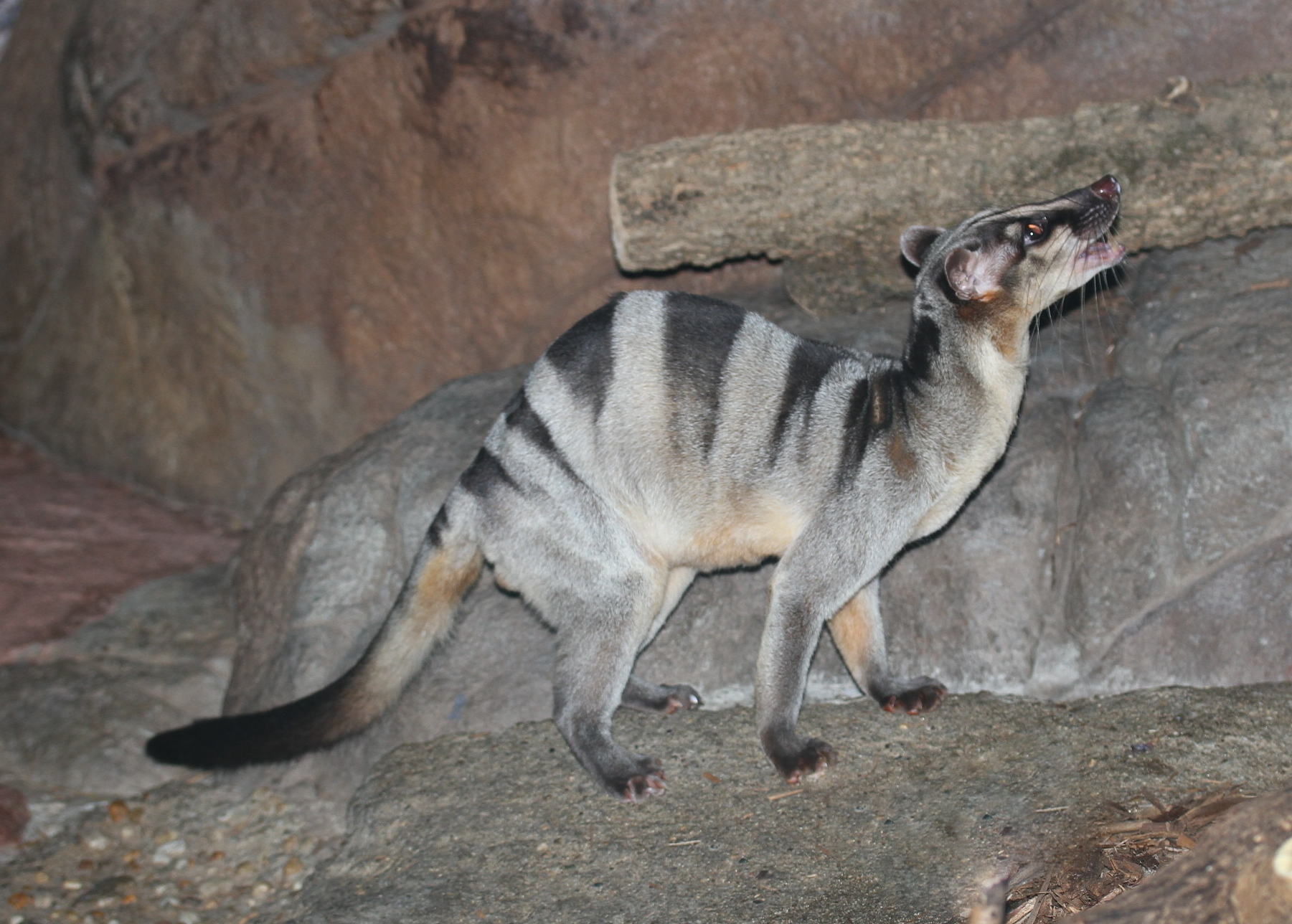
- Banded palm civet (Hemigalus derbyanus)

Scientific classification
- Kingdom: Animalia
- Phylum: Chordata
- Class: Mammalia
- Order: Carnivora
- Family: Viverridae
- Subfamily: Hemigalinae; Gray, 1864

= Hemigalinae =

Subfamily of carnivores

The Hemigalinae are a subfamily of the viverrids denominated and first described by John Edward Gray in 1864. Hemigalinae species are native to Southeast Asia from southern China through Indochina, Malay Peninsula to Sumatra, Borneo and Sulawesi.

== Characteristics ==
The tails of Hemigalinae species are ringed. The toes and the middle of the lower part of the tarsus are bald. The frenum, upper part, and sides of the lower part are hairy. The orbit is imperfect.

== Classification ==
The Hemigalinae subfamily comprises the following five monospecific genera:

Genus	Species	Distribution and IUCN Red List status
Hemigalus Jourdan, 1837	Banded palm civet (H. derbyanus) (Gray, 1837)	VU
Cynogale Gray, 1836	Otter civet (C. bennettii) Gray, 1836	EN
Macrogalidia Schwarz, 1910	Sulawesi palm civet (M. musschenbroekii) (Schlegel, 1877)	VU
Diplogale Thomas, 1912	Hose's palm civet (D. hosei) (Thomas, 1892)	VU
Chrotogale Thomas, 1912	Owston's palm civet (C. owstoni) Thomas, 1912	EN
