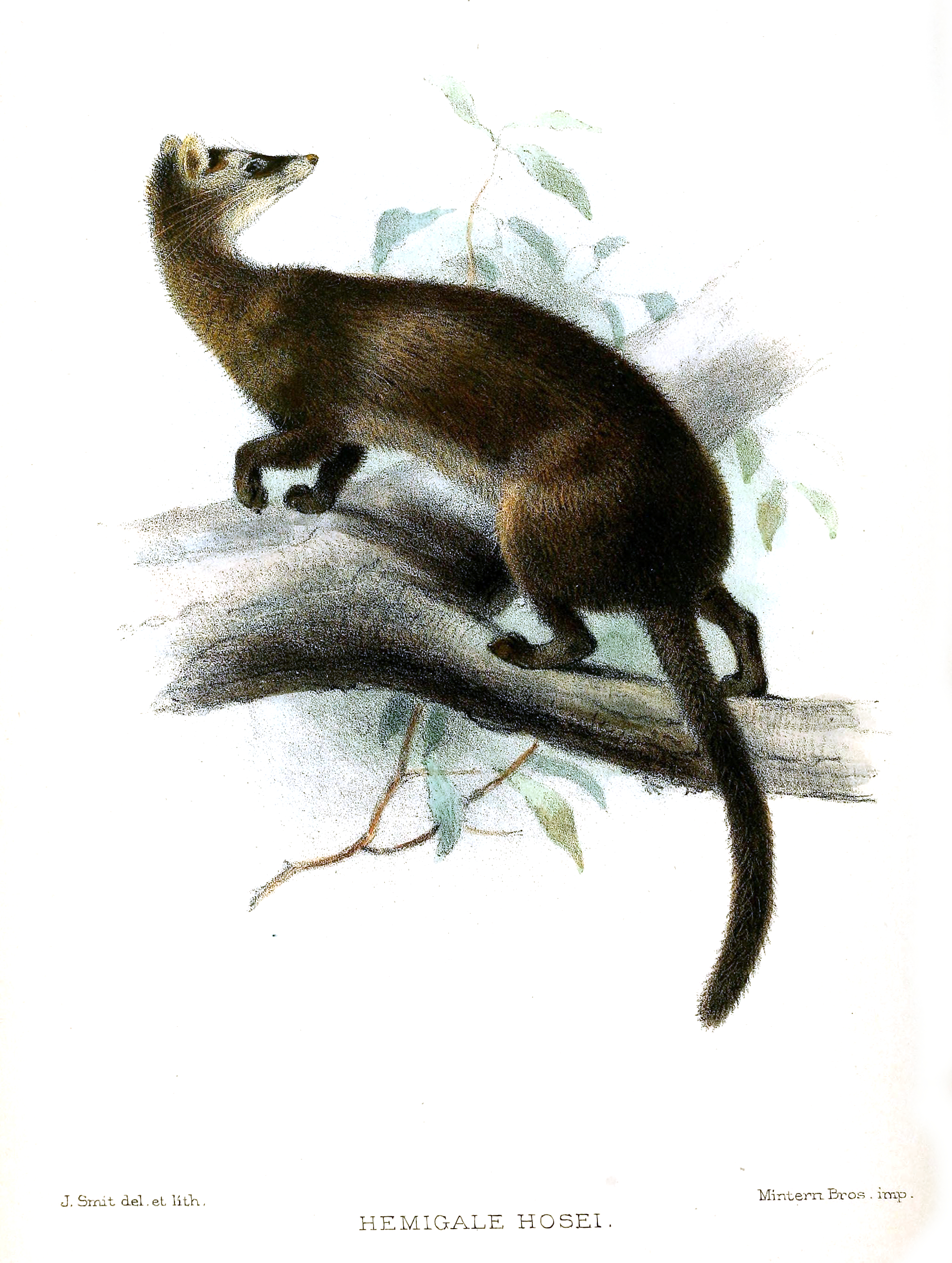

Conservation status
- Vulnerable (IUCN 3.1)

Scientific classification
- Kingdom: Animalia
- Phylum: Chordata
- Class: Mammalia
- Order: Carnivora
- Family: Viverridae
- Subfamily: Hemigalinae
- Genus: Diplogale; Thomas, 1912
- Species: D. hosei

Binomial name
- Diplogale hosei (Thomas, 1892)
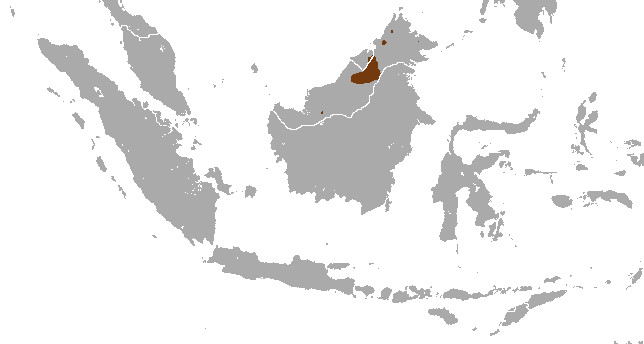
- Hose's palm civet range

= Hose's palm civet =

Species of carnivore

Hose's palm civet (Diplogale hosei), also known as Hose's civet, is a viverrid species endemic to the island of Borneo. It is listed on the IUCN Red List as Vulnerable because of an ongoing population decline, estimated to be more than 30% over the last three generations (inferred to be 15 years) and suspected to be more than 30% in the next three generations due to declines in population inferred from habitat destruction and degradation.

Diplogale is a monospecific genus. Hose's palm civet was named after the zoologist Charles Hose by Oldfield Thomas in 1892. Hose collected the first specimen in Sarawak in 1891.

What little is known of the species comes primarily from 17 museum specimens worldwide. Only in 1997, the first living specimen was obtained and released after two months. Hose's civet is not kept in captivity anywhere in the world.

== Characteristics ==
The upperparts (from nose to tail tip, including outer surfaces of the four limbs) are dark brown to blackish brown and the underparts (from the chin to the tip of the tail and the inner surface of all four limbs) are white or slightly brownish white. The face has dark rings around the eyes and very long, white facial whiskers (sensory hairs) and the large, wet snout (rhinarium) has a contrasting flesh colour. The two nostrils protrude widely, diverging to open on both sides. The under surfaces of the feet are pale and the footpads are brown. The feet are partly webbed, with patches of short hair between the footpads.

The Hose's civet has a head-body length of 472–540 millimetres (18.6–21.3 in), a tail of 298–346 millimetres (11.7–13.6 in), a hind foot length of 74–81 millimetres (2.9–3.2 in) and an ear length of 36–39 millimetres (1.4–1.5 in); it is estimated to weigh about 1.4–1.5 kilograms (3.1–3.3 lb) and has 40 teeth.

== Distribution and habitat ==
Hose's civet has been recorded in a few localities in Sarawak and Sabah in Malaysian Borneo, and in Brunei. It has been recorded in Kalimantan at an elevation of 325 m (1,066 ft).

Very few field sightings of the species were mainly in lower montane forest and mature mixed dipterocarp forest.

A few recent sightings exist, including a capture in Brunei (which was subsequently released) and a photo taken by a camera trap in lowland forest of Kinabalu National Park in Sabah. Another camera trap picture taken in Kalimantan may represent this species, but has been the subject of controversy.

The highest encounter rate of the species so far has been in the Sela'an-Linau Forest Management Unit (FMU), a logging concession in the Upper Baram, Sarawak, where fourteen images of the Hose's civet were obtained between 2004 and 2005 from four different sites in the concession. The previous largest series of encounters from one locality consisted of four specimens collected between 1945 and 1949 by Tom Harrisson in the nearby Kelabit Highlands, suggesting that this part of Sarawak may be the prime habitat of the species.

The few records of Hose's civet from across its range have been mainly from montane forest sites, giving rise to the assumption that it is a montane species. However, it has been recorded at an altitude of only 450 m (1,480 ft) in Brunei and 600 m (2,000 ft) in Batu Song, Sarawak; an individual was imaged in a camera trap in the lowland forest of Mount Kinabalu National Park, Sabah, also at an altitude of 600 m (2,000 ft), and one of the 14 images from the Sela'an-Linau FMU was from an altitude of 730 m (2,400 ft).

It is possible that the preferred habitat of Hose's civet is highly humid, such as mossy forests, near mossy boulders and streams.

== Ecology and behaviour ==
The Hose's civet is both crepuscular and nocturnal by nature and is thought to be of a more ground-dwelling nature than other viverrids. It is thought to make dens in holes between rocks and/or tree roots.

=== Diet ===
Little is known about the diet of Hose's civet in the wild, though it is thought to forage on small fish, shrimps, crabs, frogs and insects among mossy boulders and streams. The sole individual ever in captivity ate only meat and fish and not fruit, the preferred diet of all other viverrids in Borneo.

== Threats ==
Habitat loss and degradation have been assumed to be major threats to this species. Hose's civet may be intolerant to disturbance caused by logging, though whether it is able to persist and/or disperse through forest fragmented by slash and burn fields and logging roads is still unknown. Hunting could increasingly be a threat to the species as population numbers and trends are completely unknown. It is possible that the species could qualify for a higher threat category once more information is available on its ecology and threats. It is considered urgent to promote and conduct further research on this species.

== Conservation ==
Currently, the basic factors likely to determine the long-term future of the Hose's civet, such as population densities, degree of dependency on old-growth forest, ranging and dispersal patterns and others, are entirely unknown, making specific conservation measures impossible. No protected area within its range is known to hold a large population, although in Brunei and Sabah, individuals have been recorded in Ulu Temburong National Park and Mount Kinabalu National Park, respectively. In Sarawak, no protected area is known to hold a population of the species. a listing which is completely inferential, based on its highly restricted range and extensive habitat loss (deforestation) and degradation within that range due to logging and conversion to non-forest land uses.

== Similar species ==
The Hose's civet is similar to the banded palm civet (Hemigalus derbyanus). Hose's civet was first described as Hemigalus hosei in 1892 by Oldfield Thomas and it was only in 1912 that he found that the difference in shape of muzzle and teeth, as well as the obvious difference in the pattern of colouration, implied the necessity of distinguishing Diplogale from Hemigalus. Like the Hose's civet, the banded palm civet is strictly nocturnal and more ground dwelling; the distribution of Hose's civet, however, is much more restricted and more confined to higher altitude forest.

The large snout and long facial whiskers of Hose's civet is similar to that of the otter civet (Cynogale bennettii). The otter civet is known to be semiaquatic and has webbed feet; it occurs mainly in lowland rain forest.
