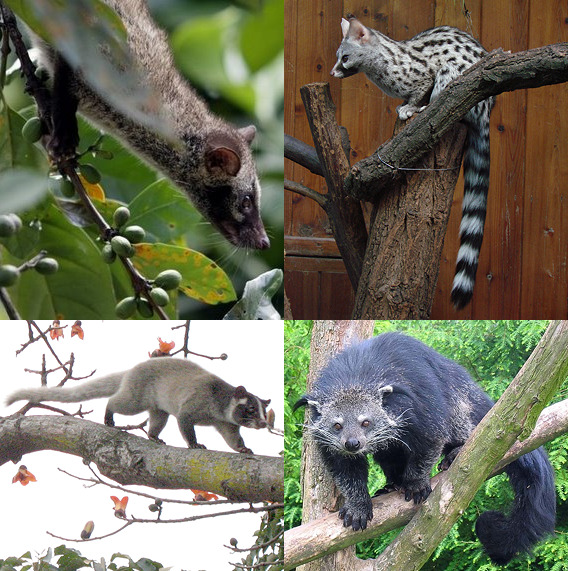
- Viverrids (clockwise from top left): species of Paradoxurus, Genetta, Arctictis and Paguma

Scientific classification
- Kingdom: Animalia
- Phylum: Chordata
- Class: Mammalia
- Infraclass: Placentalia
- Order: Carnivora
- Infraorder: Aeluroidea
- Parvorder: Viverroidea
- Family: Viverridae; Gray, 1821

Type genus
- Viverra Linnaeus, 1758

Genera
- Subfamily Genettinae; Genetta; Poiana; †Semigenetta; Subfamily Hemigalinae; Hemigalus; Chrotogale; Cynogale; Diplogale; Macrogalidia; Subfamily Paradoxurinae; Paradoxurus; Paguma; Arctictis; Arctogalidia; †Kanuites; †Kichechia; †Siamictis; †Tugenictis; Subfamily Viverrinae; Civettictis; Viverra; Viverricula; †Vishnuictis
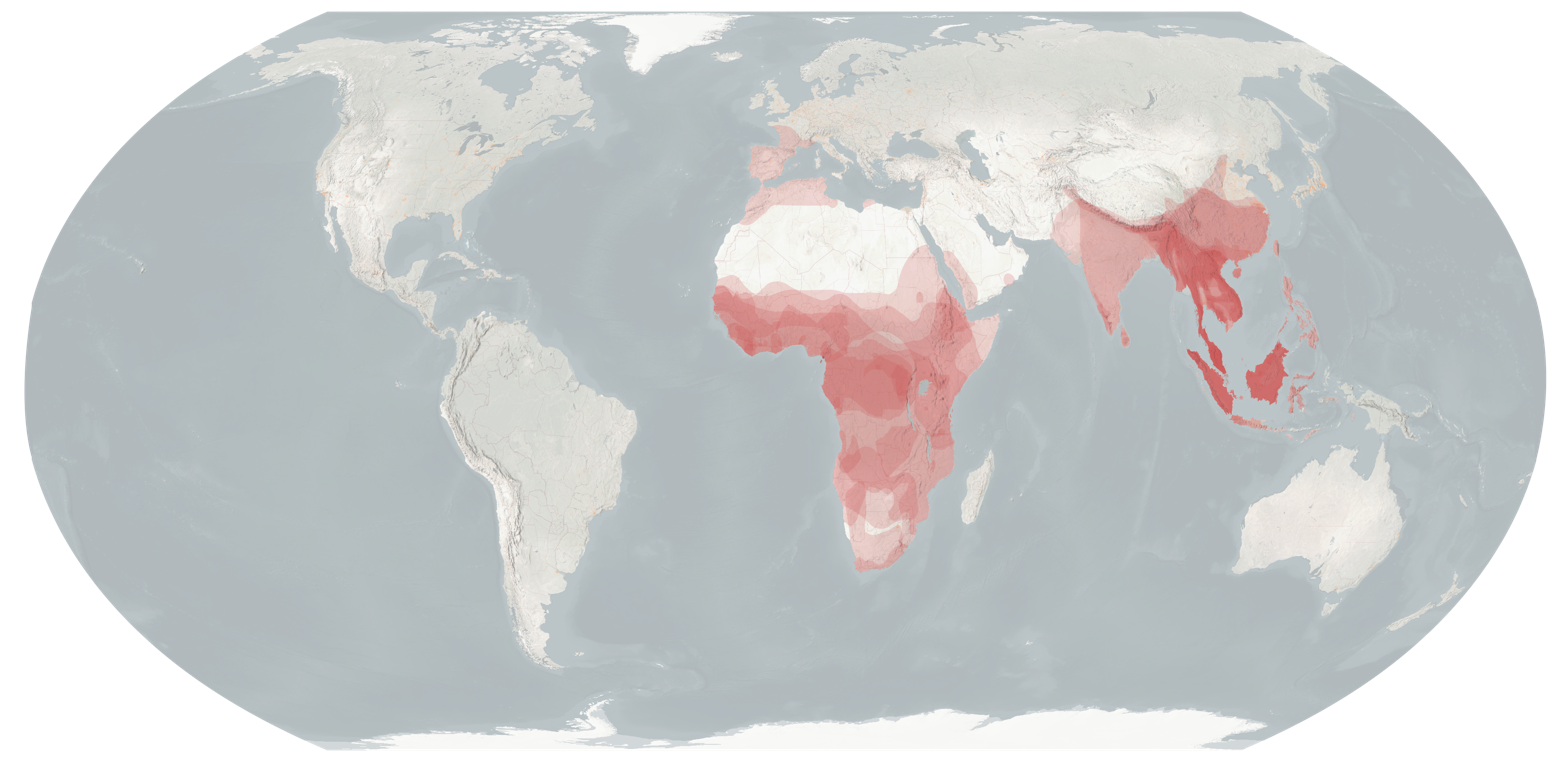
- Distribution of living viverrid species

= Viverridae =

Viverridae Temporal range: 34–0 Ma Eocene to Recent

Family of carnivorans

Viverridae is a family of small to medium-sized feliform mammals, comprising 14 genera with 33 species. This family was named and first described by John Edward Gray in 1821. Viverrids occur all over Africa, in southern Europe, and in South and Southeast Asia on both sides of the Wallace Line.

The species of the subfamily Genettinae are known as genets and oyans. The viverrids of the subfamily Viverrinae are commonly called civets; the Paradoxurinae and most Hemigalinae species are called palm civets.

== Characteristics ==
Viverrids have four or five toes on each foot and half-retractile claws. They have six incisors in each jaw and molars with two tubercular grinders behind in the upper jaw, and one in the lower jaw. The tongue is rough with sharp prickles. A pouch or gland occurs beneath the anus, but there is no cecum. The male's urethral opening is directed backward.

Viverrids are the most primitive of all the families of feliform Carnivora and clearly less specialized than the Felidae. In external characteristics, they are distinguished from the Felidae by the longer muzzle and tuft of facial vibrissae between the lower jaw bones, and by the shorter limbs and the five-toed hind foot with the first digit present. The skull differs by the position of the postpalatine foramina on the maxilla, almost always well in advance of the maxillopalatine suture, and usually about the level of the second premolar; and by the distinct external division of the auditory bulla into its two elements either by a definite groove or, when rarely this is obliterated, by the depression of the tympanic bone in front of the swollen entotympanic. The typical dental formula is: 3.1.4.23.1.4.2, but the number may be reduced, although never to the same extent as in the Felidae.

Their flesh-shearing carnassial teeth are relatively undeveloped compared to those of other feliform carnivorans. Most viverrid species have a penis bone (a baculum).

== Classification ==
=== Living species ===
In 1821, Gray defined this family as consisting of the genera Viverra, Genetta, Herpestes, and Suricata. Reginald Innes Pocock later redefined the family as containing a great number of highly diversified genera, and being susceptible of division into several subfamilies, based mainly on the structure of the feet and of some highly specialized scent glands, derived from the skin, which are present in most of the species and are situated in the region of the external generative organs. He subordinated the subfamilies Hemigalinae, Paradoxurinae, Prionodontinae, and Viverrinae to the Viverridae.

In 1833, Edward Turner Bennett described the Malagasy fossa (Cryptoprocta ferox) and subordinated the Cryptoprocta to the Viverridae. A molecular and morphological analysis based on DNA/DNA hybridization experiments suggests that Cryptoprocta does not belong within Viverridae, but is a member of the Eupleridae.

The African palm civet (Nandinia binotata) resembles the civets of the Viverridae, but is genetically distinct and belongs in its own monotypic family, the Nandiniidae. There is little dispute that the Poiana species are viverrids.

DNA analysis based on 29 carnivoran species, comprising 13 Viverrinae species and three species representing Paradoxurus, Paguma and Hemigalinae, confirmed Pocock's assumption that the African linsang Poiana represents the sister group of the genus Genetta. The placement of Prionodon as the sister group of the family Felidae is strongly supported, and it was proposed that the Asiatic linsangs be placed in the monogeneric family Prionodontidae.

Family Viverridae
Subfamily	Genus	Species	Image of type species
Viverrinae	Viverra Linnaeus, 1758	Large Indian civet (V. zibetha) Linnaeus, 1758; Malayan civet (V. tangalunga) Gray, 1832; Malabar large-spotted civet (V. civettina) Blyth, 1862; Large-spotted civet (V. megaspila) Blyth, 1862	
Viverrinae	Viverricula Hodgson, 1838	Small Indian civet (V. indica) (Geoffroy Saint-Hilaire, 1803)	
Viverrinae	Civettictis Pocock, 1915	African civet (C. civetta) (Schreber, 1776)	
Hemigalinae Gray, 1864
Hemigalinae Gray, 1864	Hemigalus Jourdan, 1837	Banded palm civet (H. derbyanus) Jourdan, 1837	
Hemigalinae Gray, 1864	Cynogale Gray, 1836	Otter civet (C. bennettii) Gray, 1836	
Hemigalinae Gray, 1864	Diplogale Thomas, 1912	Hose's palm civet (D. hosei) (Thomas, 1892)	
Hemigalinae Gray, 1864	Macrogalidia Schwarz, 1910	Sulawesi palm civet (M. musschenbroekii) (Schlegel, 1877)	
Hemigalinae Gray, 1864	Chrotogale Thomas, 1912	Owston's palm civet (C. owstoni) Thomas, 1912	
Paradoxurinae Gray, 1864	Paradoxurus Cuvier, 1822	Asian palm civet (P. hermaphroditus) (Pallas, 1777); Golden palm civet (P. zeylonensis) (Pallas, 1778); Brown palm civet (P. jerdoni) Blanford, 1885	
Paradoxurinae Gray, 1864	Arctictis Temminck, 1824	Binturong (A. binturong) (Raffles, 1822)	
Paradoxurinae Gray, 1864	Paguma Gray, 1831	Masked palm civet (P. larvata) (Smith, 1827)	
Paradoxurinae Gray, 1864	Arctogalidia Merriam, 1897	Small-toothed palm civet (A. trivirgata) (Gray, 1832)	
Genettinae	Genetta Cuvier, 1816	Common genet (G. genetta) (Linnaeus, 1758); Cape genet (G. tigrina) (Schreber, 1778); South African small-spotted genet (G. felina) (Thunberg, 1811); Rusty-spotted genet (G. maculata) (Gray, 1828); Pardine genet (G. pardina) Geoffroy Saint-Hilaire, 1832; Abyssinian genet (G. abyssinica) (Rüppell, 1835); King genet (G. poensis) Waterhouse, 1838; Servaline genet (G. servalina) Pucheran, 1855; Angolan genet (G. angolensis) Bocage, 1882; Giant forest genet (G. victoriae) Thomas, 1901; Hausa genet (G. thierryi) Matschie, 1902; Letaba genet (G. letabae) Thomas and Schwann, 1906; Johnston's genet (G. johnstoni) (Pocock, 1908); Aquatic genet (G. piscivora) (Allen, 1919); Crested servaline genet (G. cristata) Hayman, 1940; Schouteden's genet (G. schoutedeni) Crawford-Cabral, 1970; Bourlon's genet (G. bourloni) Gaubert, 2003	
Genettinae	Poiana Gray, 1864	Central African oyan (P. richardsonii) (Thomson, 1842); West African oyan (P. leightoni) (Pocock, 1907)	

=== Phylogeny ===
The phylogenetic relationships of Viverridae are shown in the following cladogram:

- Viverridae
  - - Paradoxurinae
      - - - Paradoxurus
            - - - Golden palm civet P. zeylonensis
                - Jerdon's palm civet P. jerdoni
            - Asian palm civet P. hermaphroditus
          - Paguma
            Masked palm civet P. larvata
        - Arctictis
          Binturong A. binturong
      - Arctogalidia
        Small-toothed palm civet A. trivirgata
    - Hemigalinae
      - - Cynogale
          Otter civet C. bennettii
        - Macrogalidia
          Sulawesi palm civet M. musschenbroekii
      - - Diplogale
          Hose's palm civet D. hosei
        - - Chrotogale
            Owston's palm civet C. owstoni
          - Hemigalus
            Banded palm civet H. derbyanus
  - Viverrinae sensu lato
    - Viverrinae sensu stricto
      - - Viverra
          - - - Malabar large-spotted civet V. civettina
              - Large-spotted civet V. megaspila
            - Large Indian civet V. zibetha
          - Malayan civet V. tangalunga
        - Civettictis
          African civet C. civetta
      - Viverricula
        Small Indian civet V. indica
    - Genettinae
      - Poiana
        - West African oyan P. leightoni
        - Central African oyan P. richardsonii
      - Genetta
        - - Abyssinian genet G. abyssinica
          - Haussa genet G. thierryi
        - - Giant forest genet G. victoriae
          - - Johnston's genet G. johnstoni
            - - - - Aquatic genet G. piscivora
                  - Servaline genet G. servalina
                - Crested servaline genet G. cristata
              - - South African small-spotted genet G. felina
                - Common genet G. genetta
                - - Cape genet G. tigrina
                  - - Letaba genet G. letabae
                    - Schouteden's genet G. schoutedeni
                    - Rusty-spotted genet G. maculata
                    - - - Angolan genet G. angolensis
                        - Pardine genet G. pardina
                      - - Bourlon's genet G. bourloni
                        - King genet G. poensis

=== Extinct species ===
Subfamily	Genus	Species
Viverrinae	Viverra Linnaeus, 1758	Leakey's civet (V. leakeyi) Leakey, 1982
Viverrinae	Semigenetta Helbing 1927	†S. cadeoti Roman and Viret 1934; †S. elegans Dehm, 1950; †S. grandis Crusafont & Golpe, 1981; †S. laugnacensis De Bonis, 1973; †S. ripolli Petter, 1976; †S. sansaniensis Lartet, 1851
Paradoxurinae	Kichechia Savage, 1965	†K. zamanae; †K. savagei
Paradoxurinae	Tugenictis Morales & Pickford, 2005	†T. ngororaensis Morales & Pickford, 2005
Paradoxurinae	Kanuites Dehghani & Werdelin, 2008	†K. lewisae Dehghani & Werdelin, 2008
Paradoxurinae	Siamictis Grohé et al., 2020	†S. carbonensis Grohé et al., 2020

== See also ==
- List of viverrids
