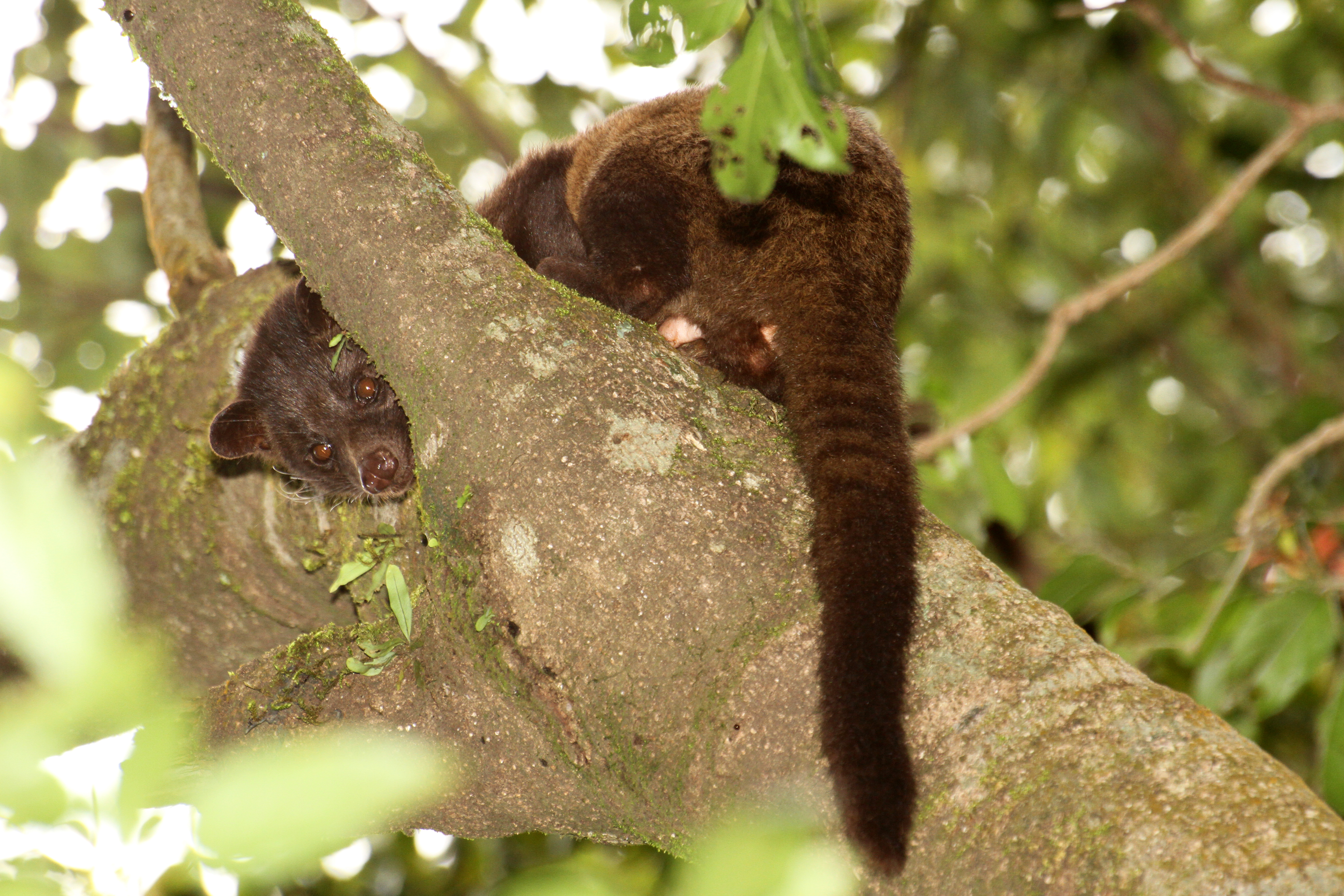

Conservation status
- Least Concern (IUCN 3.1)
- CITES Appendix III

Scientific classification
- Kingdom: Animalia
- Phylum: Chordata
- Class: Mammalia
- Order: Carnivora
- Family: Viverridae
- Genus: Paradoxurus
- Species: P. jerdoni

Binomial name
- Paradoxurus jerdoni Blanford, 1885
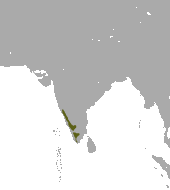
- Brown palm civet range

= Brown palm civet =

Species of carnivore

The brown palm civet (Paradoxurus jerdoni), also called the Jerdon's palm civet, is a viverrid endemic to the Western Ghats of India.

== Taxonomy ==
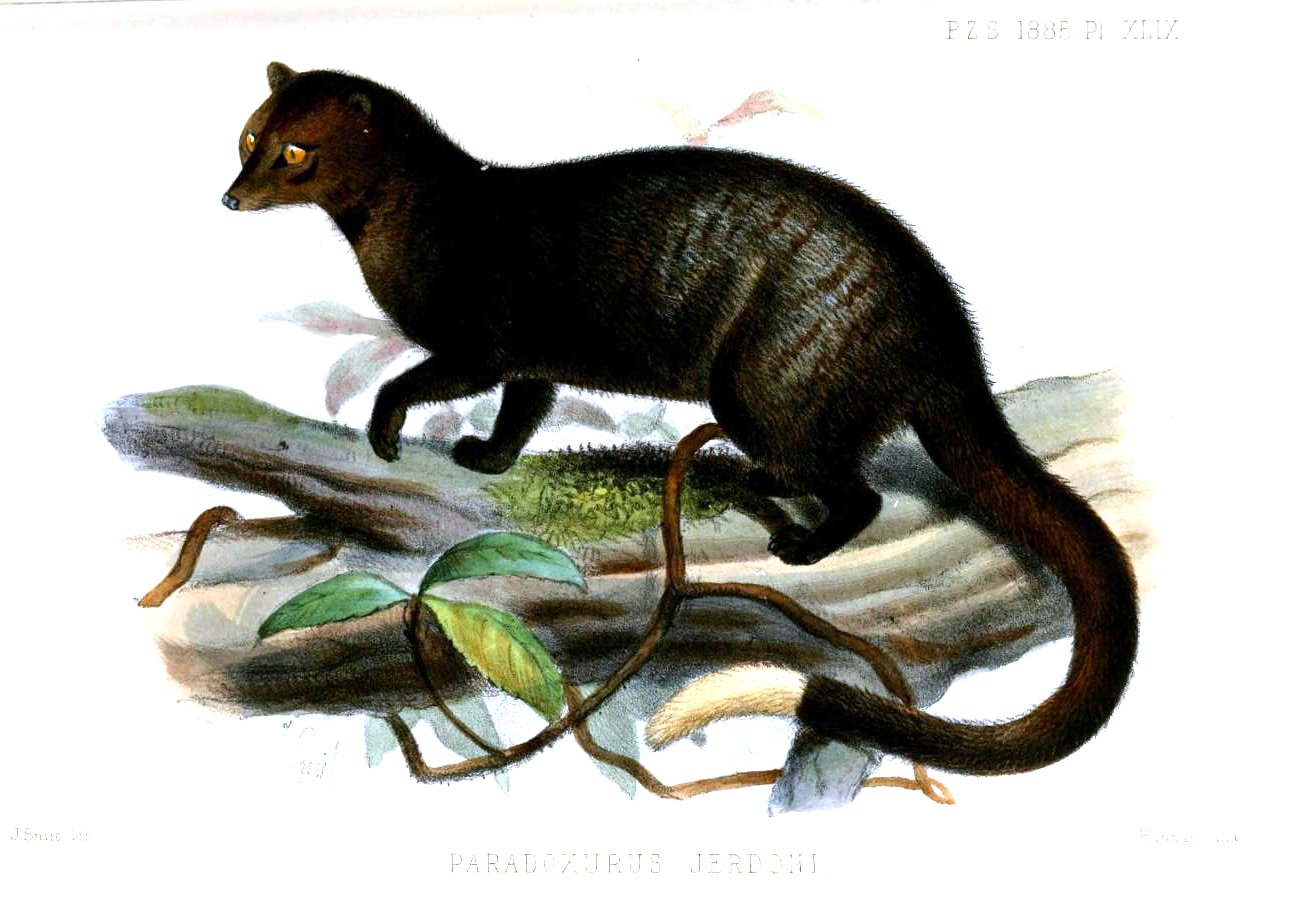
Illustration by Joseph Smit (1885)

The scientific name Paradoxurus jerdoni was introduced by William Thomas Blanford in 1885 who described a skull and pelt of a brown palm civet collected in Kodaikanal. Blanford noted the long foramen on the anterior palate and also that the pelt matched another zoological specimen collected by Francis Day. Blanford named the species in honour of Thomas C. Jerdon. The subspecies caniscus was described by Reginald Innes Pocock on the basis of a specimen collected at Virajpet in southern Coorg.

There are two subspecies, the nominate P. j. jerdoni and P. j. caniscus.

== Characteristics ==
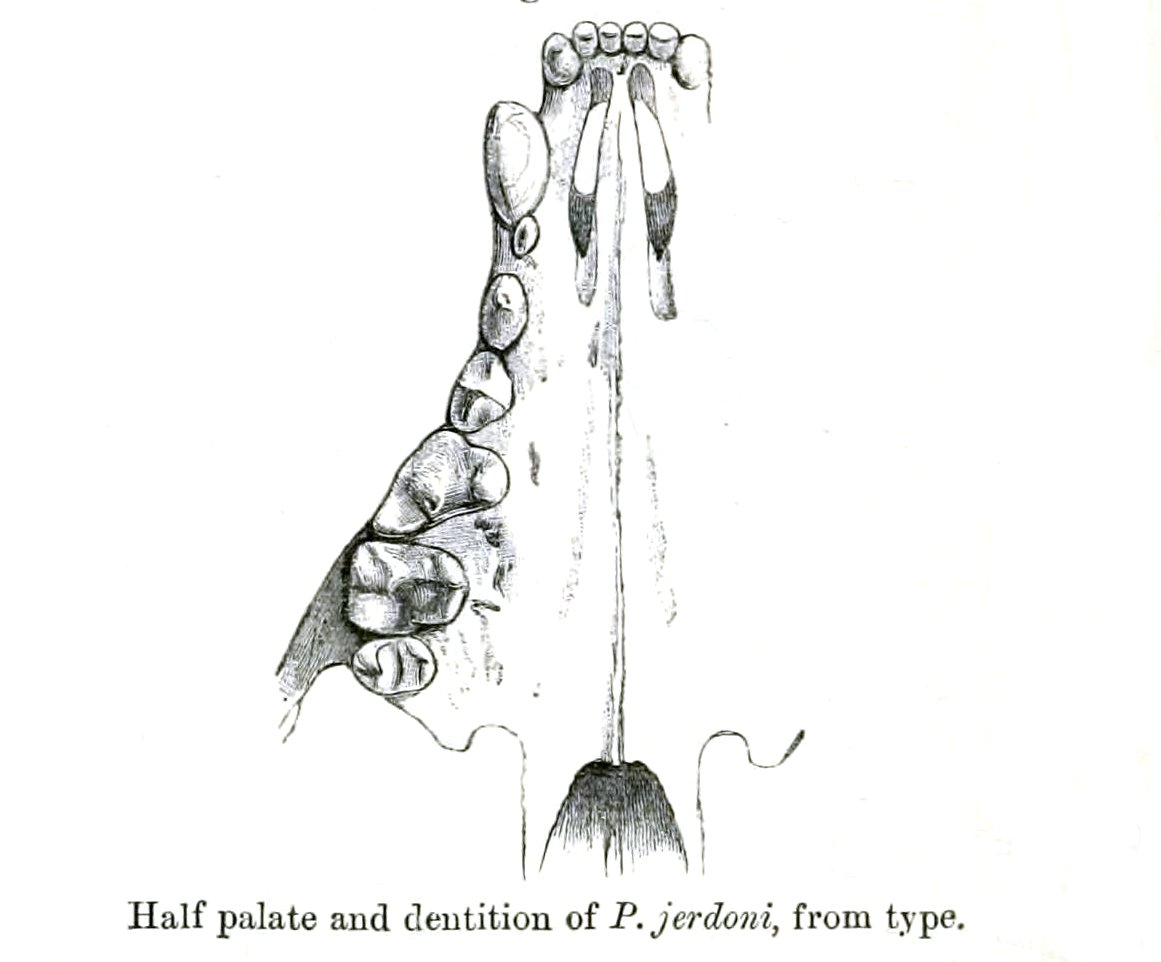
Dentition of the brown palm civet, illustration 1885

The brown palm civet has a uniformly brown pelage, darker around the head, neck, shoulder, legs, and tail. Sometimes the pelage may be slightly grizzled. Two subspecies have been described on the basis of the colour of the pelage although the colour is extremely variable, ranging from pale buff or light brown to dark brown. The dark tail sometimes has a white or pale-yellow tip. It has no distinct markings on the body or the face as in the Asian palm civet. A distinctive feature is the reversed direction of hair growth on the nape, similar to that in the golden palm civet (P. zeylonensis) of Sri Lanka. It is about as large as the common palm civet, but with a long and sleek tail. The body weight of the males ranges from 3.6–4.3 kg (7.9–9.5 lb), head and body length 430–620 mm (17–24 in), and tail length from 380–530 mm (15–21 in).

== Distribution and habitat ==
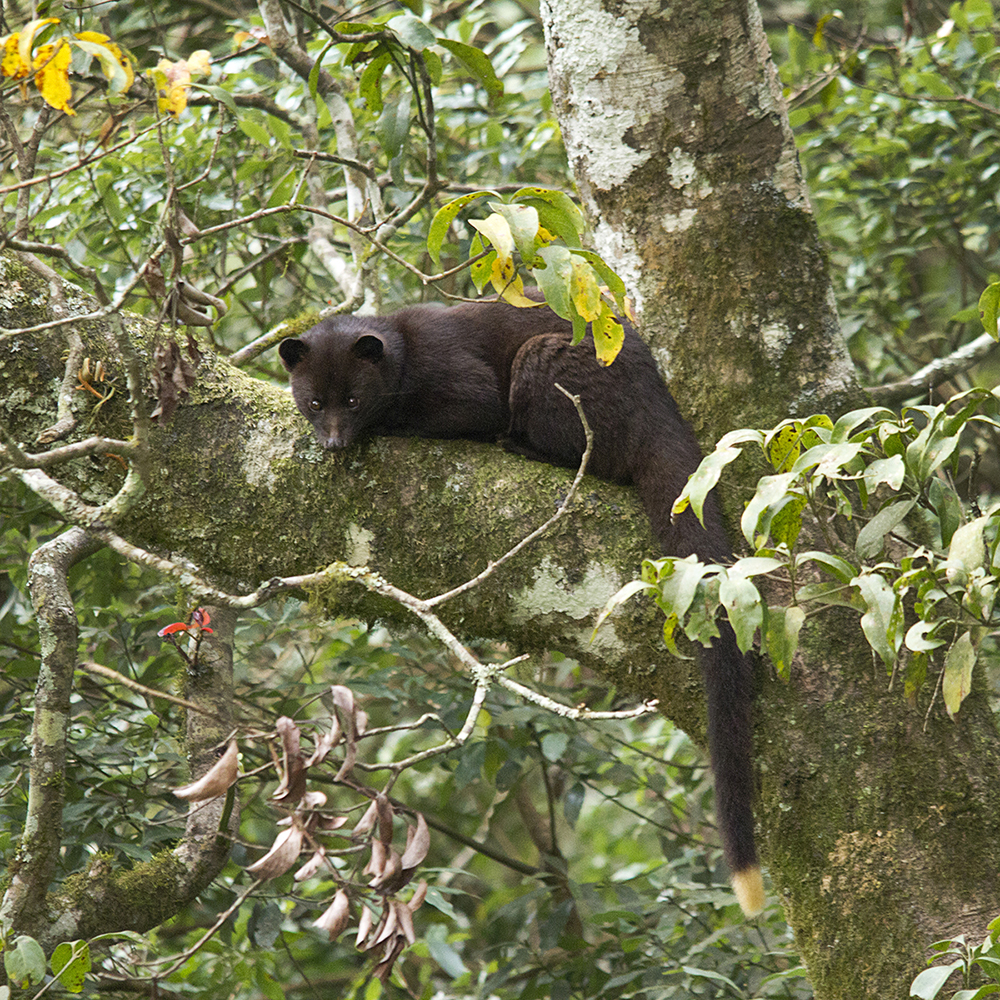
Brown palm civet in Munnar, Kerala

The brown palm civet's distribution extends from Castle Rock in Goa to the southern tip of the Western Ghats in Kalakkad Mundanthurai Tiger Reserve. It inhabits rainforest tracts at an elevation of 500–1,300 m (1,600–4,300 ft). This landscape is fragmented with remnants of tropical rainforest amidst commercially exploited patches such as tea and coffee plantations. Its ability to persist in such a landscape depends on the occurrence of a diversity of fruit tree species in these areas such as shade trees in coffee plantations.

== Ecology and behaviour ==
Brown palm civets are solitary and nocturnal. They rest during the day in day-bed sites, such as tree hollows, canopy vine tangles, Indian giant squirrel nests and forks of branches. The day-bed trees are large and are usually in dense mature forest stands with high canopy connectivity. They sometimes rest in the night in open branches.

=== Diet ===
The brown palm civet is a key mammalian seed disperser in the Western Ghats rainforest by being predominantly frugivorous and dispersing a diverse array of plant species. Fruits of more than 53 native and four introduced plant species have been recorded forming about 97% of its diet. It eats foremost fruits of trees and lianas with a diameter of less than 1 cm (0.39 in), rarely those of herbs or shrubs; fruits include many-seeded, pulpy berries, drupes with moderate to high water content, and fruits like Palaquium ellipticum, Elaeocarpus serratus, Holigarna nigra and Knema attenuata with a diameter of more than 2 cm (0.79 in). Its diet pattern varies across years and even within the same year depending on fruit availability. It also feeds on a diverse range of invertebrates and vertebrates. It has also been recorded feeding on flowers of Cullenia exarillata and Syzygium species.

== Conservation ==
Because of its large range and presence within several protected areas it has been classified as being of low conservation concern. However, these areas often do not have large mammalian dispersers and birds like hornbills and large pigeons due to habitat loss and hunting. Hence, the brown palm civet gains importance in such human-impacted landscapes as an important disperser and maintains biodiversity.
