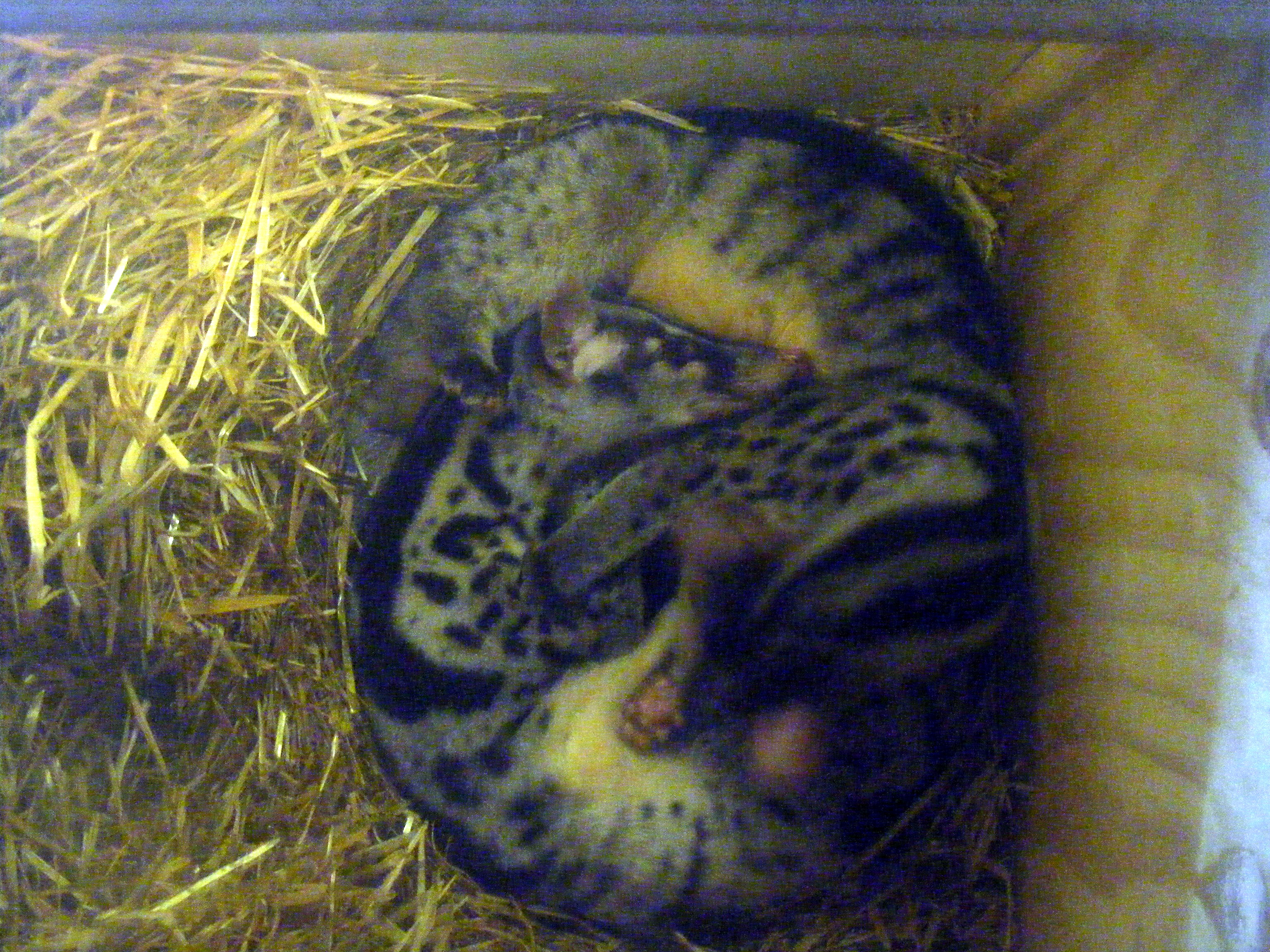
- Owston's palm civets at Paradise Wildlife Park

Conservation status
- Endangered (IUCN 3.1)

Scientific classification
- Kingdom: Animalia
- Phylum: Chordata
- Class: Mammalia
- Order: Carnivora
- Family: Viverridae
- Subfamily: Hemigalinae
- Genus: Chrotogale; Thomas, 1912
- Species: C. owstoni

Binomial name
- Chrotogale owstoni (Thomas, 1912)
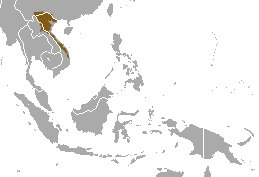
- Owston's palm civet range

= Owston's palm civet =

Species of carnivore

Owston's palm civet (Chrotogale owstoni) is a viverrid native to Vietnam, Laos and a very small portion of southern China, in three counties located in the Yunnan province: Hekou, Luchun, and Jinping, and has never been found west of the Mekong River. It is listed as endangered on the IUCN Red List because of an ongoing population decline, estimated to be more than 50% over the last three generations, inferred from over-exploitation, habitat destruction and degradation.

== Taxonomy ==
The Owston's palm civet was described by Oldfield Thomas in 1912 on the basis of a skull and skin of zoological specimen collected by Alan Owston by a river in Tonkin. Chrotogale is a monospecific genus.

== Characteristics ==
The Owston's palm civet has a tawny buff-grey body with highly contrasted black markings on its back and tail, and four bands on its back. These bands run from around the eyes to the first third of the tail. It has large rounded ears and black eyes. is a mid-sized palm civet at 57 cm (22 in) plus a tail of 43 cm (17 in), weighing around 1.8–2.7 kg (4–6 lb). The last two-thirds of the tail is completely black, and there are black spots on the legs. Both males and females of this species are very skinny. Since both males and females have the same markings, the only way to distinguish the sexes is through looking at genitalia and pelage. Females have an orange pelage only on their lower bellies, whereas males have an orange patch through the chest, that differs in hue from the ones of females.

== Distribution and habitat ==
Owston's palm civet lives in lowland evergreen forests where dry seasons are not too harsh. They live in a restricted range of territory, spanning Vietnam, Laos and a very small portion of southern China, as well as the Annamite mountains. Based on camera trapping studies, it is likely that its range is limited to only certain forests within these regions, the moist tropical evergreen forests, subtropical forests, and limestone forests.

== Behavior and ecology ==
Very little is known about the life history of the Owston's palm civet in the wild, though limited information has been gathered on captive animals. It is a solitary species, except during mating season. It is nocturnal, being active only during complete darkness in the wild, but being active from sundown to dawn in captivity. It is mainly terrestrial, spending most of their time foraging on the forest floor, but on occasion, they may climb trees and shrubbery in order to sleep. It marks objects with both urine and scent glands located on their underbellies. This marking occurs most often during breeding season, but the exact reason for marking is unknown.

=== Diet ===
The Owston's Civet spends most of its time foraging on the ground for fruits and soft-bodied animals, with a particular fondness for insects and earthworms. Based on its dentition observed in captivity, it is not able to eat large or bony animals.

=== Reproduction ===
There is no known information about the reproductive habits of this palm civet in the wild. Based on when traders see pregnant females, it is assumed that the mating season is between January and May. In captivity, females give birth to litters of 1-3 cubs after a gestation of 75 to 90 days. Pups are born with their eyes closed and weigh 80–135 g (2.8–4.8 oz). After about 10 days, they begin to walk, and reach independence at 12 to 18 weeks as they are weaned off their mother. At the age of 18 to 24 months, they are sexually mature and able to reproduce next mating season.

== Threats ==
The Owston's palm civet is listed as Endangered on the IUCN Red List, because the population is thought to have declined due to over-exploitation and habitat fragmentation. The largest threat is hunting, specifically non-specific mammal hunting. While Owston's palm civet is not a particular target for hunters, it still suffers casualties mostly due to snares placed by hunters. Most of the hunting in the region occurs within protected areas, where it is illegal to set any type of trap. The urban demand for wild meat lead to an increase of hunting in both protected areas and outside of protected areas. In some areas of Vietnam and Laos, there are hundreds of snares per kilometer.

== Conservation ==
In order to help save the Owston's palm civet, protected areas have been created in the Yunnan province. In Vietnam, it is listed in group IIB which means that the exploitation of the Owston's palm civet is regulated but not illegal. In Laos, hunting the Owston's palm civet is prohibited. Conservationists developed a 10-year plan in order to help preserve the Owston's palm civet. The conservation priorities are to cut down on snaring and to reduce the consumption of wild meat. They propose to do this by bringing the wild meat issue to the government, in hopes of passing laws to change the behavior. They also hope to establish a genetically diverse Owston's palm civet population that can be released back into the wild.

=== In captivity ===
The Carnivore and Pangolin Conservation Program in Cúc Phương National Park was founded in 1995 and is the only center for rehabilitation and breeding of the Owston's palm civet; the program is run in cooperation with various zoos including Newquay Zoo. Since it was founded in 1995, 14 Owston's palm civets were rescued and rehabilitated, and 66 were born in the center as of the 2019 conservation planning workshop for the Owston's palm civet. The Newquay Zoo keeps two Owston's civets brought from Vietnam in 2005.
