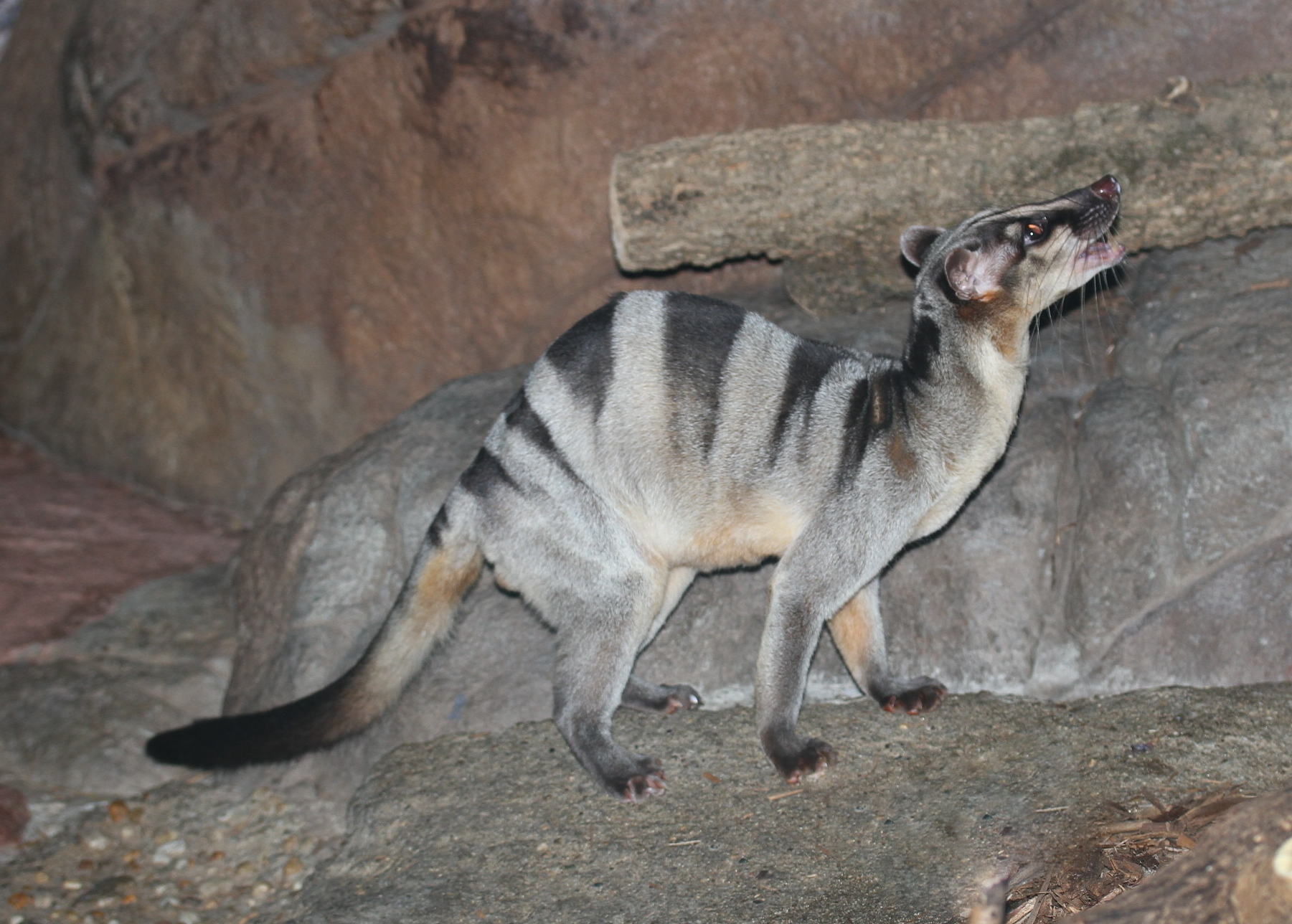
- A banded palm civet in the Cincinnati Zoo

Conservation status
- Near Threatened (IUCN 3.1)
- CITES Appendix II

Scientific classification
- Kingdom: Animalia
- Phylum: Chordata
- Class: Mammalia
- Infraclass: Placentalia
- Order: Carnivora
- Family: Viverridae
- Genus: Hemigalus; Jourdan, 1837
- Species: H. derbyanus

Binomial name
- Hemigalus derbyanus (Gray, 1837)

Subspecies
- H. d. derbyanus (Gray, 1837); H. d. boiei Muller, 1838; H. d. minor Miller, 1903; H. d. sipora Chasen & Kloss, 1927
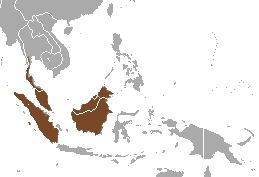
- Banded palm civet range

Synonyms
- Paradoxurus derbyanus

= Banded palm civet =

Species of carnivore

The banded palm civet (Hemigalus derbyanus (Note: Indonesian: Musang Belang)), also called the banded civet, is a viverrid native to Indomalaya. They primarily inhabit lowland conifer habitat, which is under threat from encroaching human activity. It is estimated the population of the banded palm civet has decreased by around 30% in just three generations. Banded palm civets are usually approximately the size of a domestic cat; their fur is pale but with dark bands on the back. They are believed to be closely related to Hose's palm civets, which are similar in appearance and distribution.

The banded palm civet is the only species in its genus, first scientifically described in 1837. The species comprises four subspecies, distributed across Indonesia and Southeast Asia. Two of the subspecies diverged from each other as long ago as 2.7 million years.

Banded palm civets are affected by a variety of parasites, such as nematodes, and are primarily carnivorous, eating small animals such as rodents and bugs. They have sensitive hairs on their paws which help them to detect potential prey.

== Classification ==
The genus Hemigalus was named and first described in 1837 by Claude Jourdan who had a skin and skeleton of one zoological specimen at his disposal. In the same year, John Edward Gray described a specimen from the Malay Peninsula under the names Paradoxurus derbyanus and Paradoxurus derbianus. In 1939, Reginald Innes Pocock subordinated banded palm civet specimens described between 1837 and 1915 under the genus Hemigalus and recognised that it is a monotypic taxon. The genus name is derived from the Greek hemi (half) and galus (weasel), due to its appearance.

The species is believed to be closely related to Hose's palm civet – another species of civet in the subfamily Hemigalinae, also distributed in Southeast Asia, and with a similar build and appearance.

=== Subspecies ===
There are four subspecies: H. derbyanus derbyanus, H. d. boiei, H. d. minor, and H. d. sipora. H. d. derbyanus is known from Myanmar and mainland Malaysia as well as Sumatra; H. d. boiei is known only from Borneo; H. d. minor, from South Pagai and the Mentawai islands; and H. d. sipora, from Sipora and the Mentawai islands. There is also a population on Siberut island, but it has not been attributed to any subspecies.

It is estimated that H. d. minor and H. d. derbyanus diverged from each other some 2.7 million years ago.

== Description ==
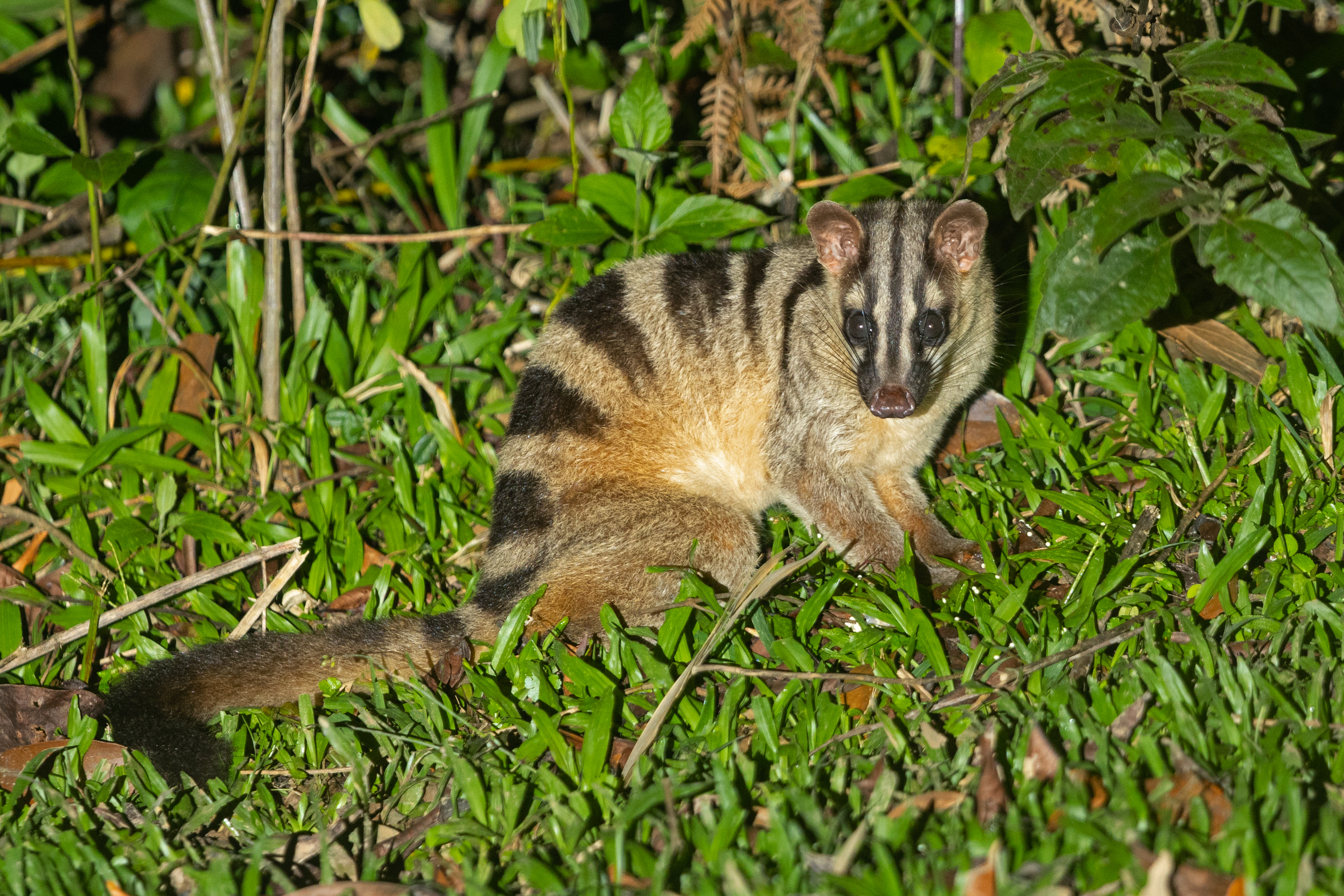
A banded palm civet in Borneo

The banded palm civet's fur is usually pale in colour, and they have between seven and eight dark bands on their face and on their back. The pale colour is typically pale brown, grey, whitish or buff, but can also be yellowish; the bands are usually dark brown, black, or chestnut in colour. It is roughly the size of domestic cat, growing up to 53 cm (21 in) in length – minus the tail – and weighing from 1–3 kg (2.2–6.6 lb). The tail is usually three-quarters the length of the body and head combined, and appear to swell in size in response to a threat. It has sensitive hairs in between the pads of its paws for sensing prey.

== Distribution and habitat ==
The banded palm civet is native to Myanmar, Thailand, Peninsular Malaysia, Sumatra, the Mentawai Islands and Borneo from sea level up to an elevation of 1,660 m (5,450 ft).

In Myanmar, only two individuals were recorded between the early 20th century and the 1960s, both in the far south. In 2022, it was photographed by a camera trap for the first time in a reserved forest in Tanintharyi Region. In Thailand, it was photographed during camera trap surveys in the years 1996–2013 in Khlong Saeng Wildlife Sanctuary, Khao Sok National Park, Kui Buri National Park and Hala-Bala Wildlife Sanctuary, all in evergreen forests at elevations of 162–695 m (531–2,280 ft). In Peninsular Malaysia, it was recorded in just two locations during surveys in 2011–2012 in a hilly dipterocarp forest in Terengganu.

In Sumatra, it was recorded at an elevation of 150 m (490 ft) in primary forest in Kerinci Seblat National Park and on the west coast also at 800 m (2,600 ft). In Bukit Barisan Selatan National Park, it was photographed in primary evergreen forest at the elevation of 800–1,089 m (2,625–3,573 ft) in 2011. In South Solok Regency, it was recorded in forest fragments within an oil palm plantation adjacent to Kerinci Seblat National Park in 2015.

It was extirpated in Singapore in the early 20th century.

== Behaviour and ecology ==
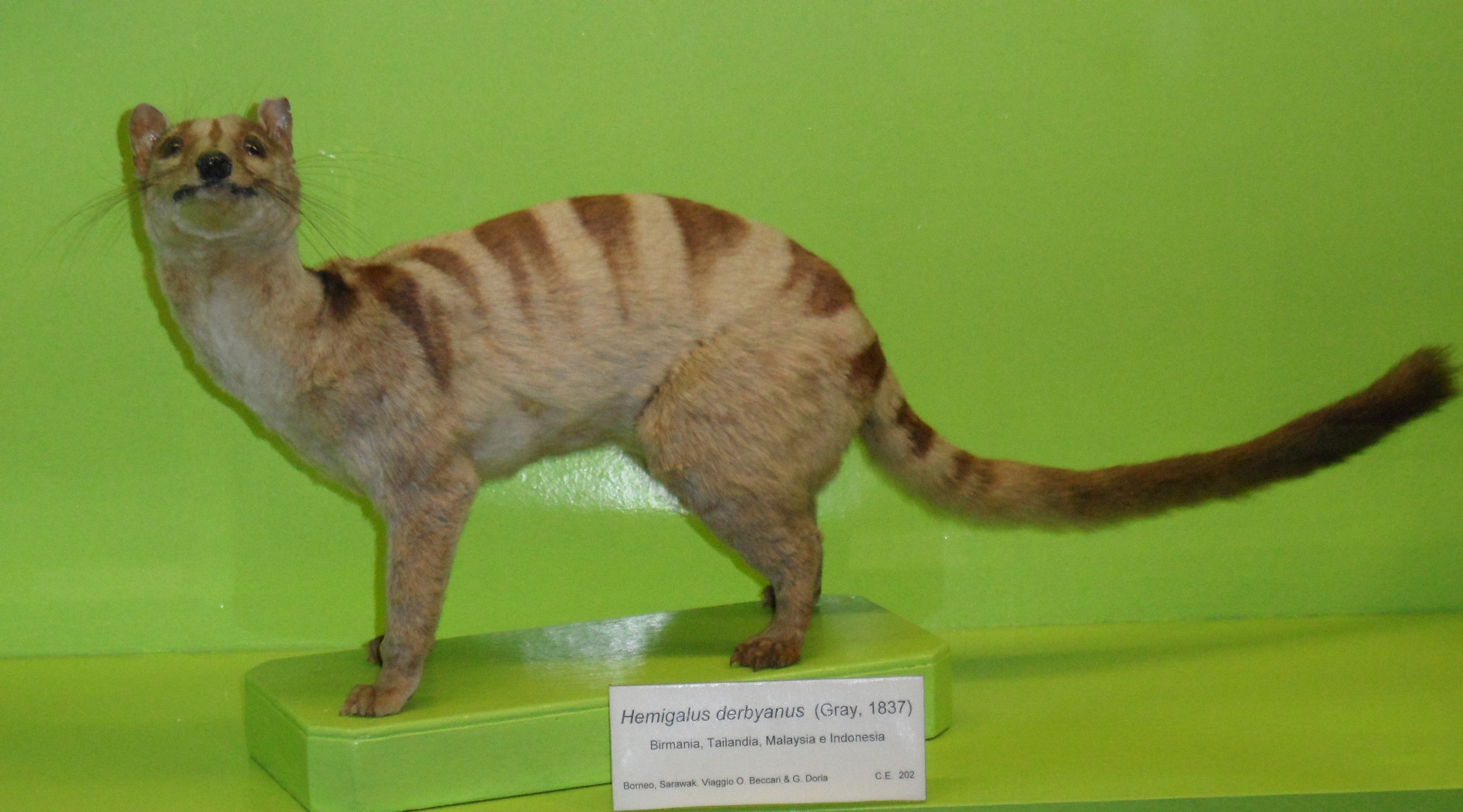
Specimen on display at the Natural History Museum of Genoa

The banded palm civet is nocturnal and spends the day in low tree holes. It is thought to be a solitary animal. Its activity pattern overlaps with two other species of civet, rodents, as well as the clouded leopard and the Sunda clouded leopard – potential predators.

In response to a predator or other threat, banded palm civets swell their tails.

=== Diet ===
The banded palm civet is a strict carnivore and preys on a variety of small animals, including crustaceans, ants, spiders, worms, rats, frogs, small reptiles and birds. It occasionally feeds on vegetation and fruits. Twelve scat samples contained worms, orthopterans and invertebrates.

Banded palm civets hunt around water or along the forest floor. To attack large prey, the civets bite the back of the victim's neck and then shake vigorously, then hold their victim with their front paws, allowing them to attack with their teeth.

=== Reproduction ===
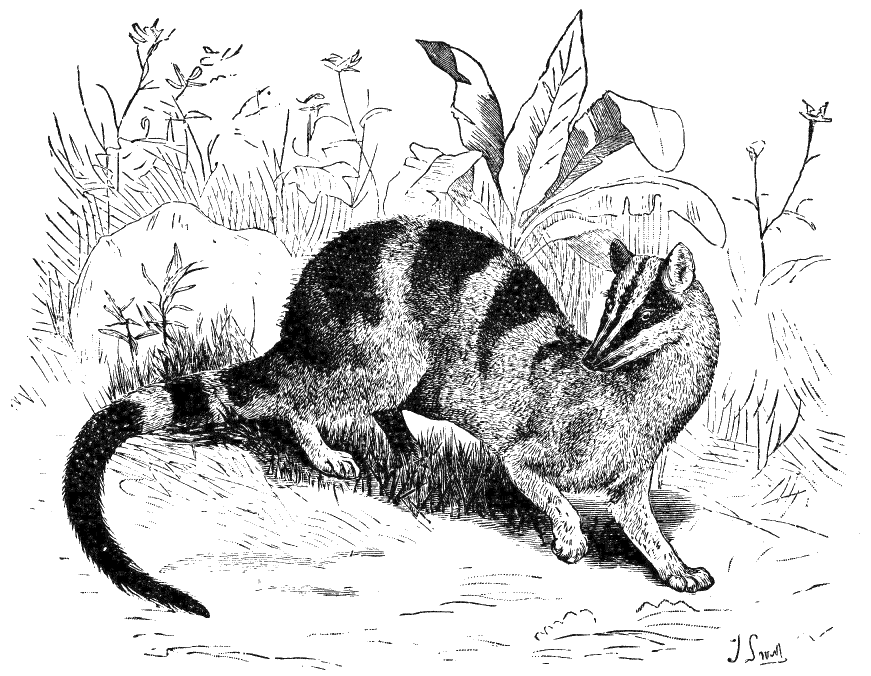
An illustration of the banded palm civet from The Cambridge Natural History (1902)

Females have one or two litters a year with one or two young. The gestation period varies from 32 to 64 days. Data from the wild suggests they usually live up to twelve years of age, although one civet taken into captivity is recorded having lived for eighteen years. The newborns weigh as little as 125 g (4.4 oz) and usually first open their eyes eight to twelve days after being born. They typically nurse for up to 70 days.

The generation length of the banded palm civet is five years.

=== Health ===
Analysis of the gut content of two banded palm civet roadkills in northern Borneo revealed a variety of parasites, including nematodes, eggs of trematodes, mites and pinworms.

== Threats ==
The major threat to the banded palm civet is loss and destruction of natural habitat loss by logging and subsequent conversion to agriculture, plantations and construction of dams. It is hunted and eaten by local people in Sabah. Its preferred habitat, lowland forest, is particularly prone to such threats. In 2016, the population was thought to have declined by 30% over just three generations. In 2022, it was estimated that the population has declined to just 21% of the IUCN Red List distribution.

Some humans take them from their natural habitat to keep them as pets.

== Conservation ==
The banded palm civet is listed as Near Threatened on the IUCN Red List, and the global population is thought to be decreasing. It is protected under CITES' Appendix II. About 24% of its estimated range is in protected areas. but a later (2022) study estimated that value to be only 12%.
