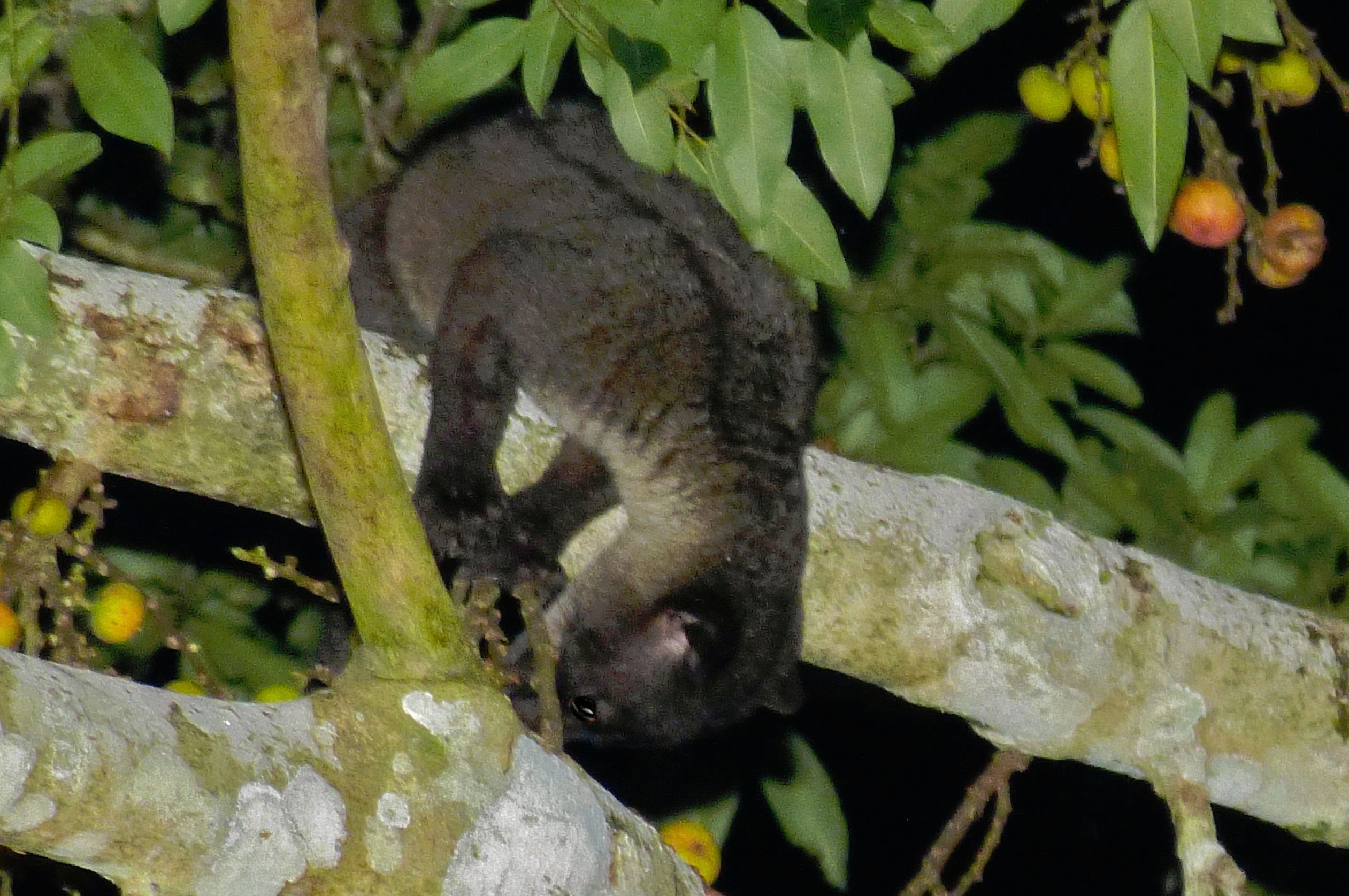

Conservation status
- Least Concern (IUCN 3.1)

Scientific classification
- Kingdom: Animalia
- Phylum: Chordata
- Class: Mammalia
- Order: Carnivora
- Family: Viverridae
- Subfamily: Paradoxurinae
- Genus: Arctogalidia; Merriam, 1897
- Species: A. trivirgata

Binomial name
- Arctogalidia trivirgata (Gray, 1832)

Subspecies
- A. t. trivirgata; A. t. leucotis; A. t. trilineata
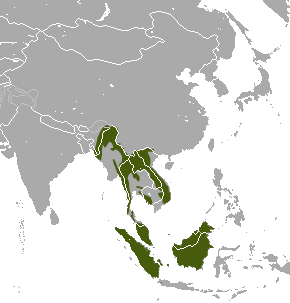
- Small-toothed palm civet range

= Small-toothed palm civet =

Species of carnivore

The small-toothed palm civet (Arctogalidia trivirgata), also known as the three-striped palm civet, is a viverrid native to dense forests from Northeast India to mainland Southeast Asia and the islands of Borneo, Sumatra and Java.

A monotypic genus, Arctogalidia means 'bear-weasel' (from ancient Greek arkto- 'bear' + galidia 'little weasel'). The specific epithet trivirgata means 'three-striped' in Latin.

== Taxonomy ==
The scientific name Paradoxurus trivirgatus was proposed by John Edward Gray in 1832 in his first scientific description of a small-toothed palm civet that was based on a zoological specimen from the Maluku Islands in the collection of the Rijksmuseum van Natuurlijke Historie. The small-toothed palm civet is a member of the subfamily Paradoxurinae, described by Gray in 1864.

There exists a debate among taxonomists as to whether individuals from Borneo and the Peninsular Malaysia are different species. Molecular modelling has suggested that the small-toothed palm civets in Borneo form a different clade belonging to Arctogalidia stigmatica; they may have genetically diverged during the Pliocene when rising sea levels in the South China Sea restricted connections between Borneo and the Sundaic Region. Three subspecies have been described:

- A. t. leucotis in the north of the Kra Isthmus has a distinct white ear tip
- A. t. trivirgata in Peninsular Malaysia and Sumatra has a dark coat coloration
- A. t. trilineata in West Java is characterized by a light coat coloration.

== Description ==
The small-toothed palm civet is blackish grey, has black paws and three black longitudinal stripes on the back. The black stripes appear as rows of broken spots, but some individuals also have white tips on the ears, depending on their region of origin. The long tail has a tubular shape, and appears light and fluffy. Its body measures about 53 cm (21 in) with a tail of 58 cm (23 in) and weighs 2.4 kg (5.3 lb). It has short fur that is generally a tawny or buff color while the head is a darker greyish tawny. The coat color is generally lighter at a younger age, and darkens as the individuals matures. Its muzzle is brown with a white streak that extends from the nose to the forehead. Females have the perineal scent gland near the vulva.

== Behaviour ==
The small-toothed palm civet's diet is varied and omnivorous, and usually consists of insects, small mammals, nesting birds, fruits, frogs and lizards. It is solitary, arboreal and nocturnal. However, small-toothed palm civets have occasionally been spotted feeding together in the treetops as well as falling asleep while making physical contact.

=== Reproduction ===
Very little is known about the reproductive behavior of the small-toothed palm civet due to their arboreal and nocturnal lifestyle. It is believed that they follow an aseasonal reproductive schedule, with females having two to three litters per year. Each litter contains 2-3 young civets. The gestation period for small-toothed palm civets is roughly 45 days.

== Conservation ==
The small-toothed palm civet is listed as least concern on the IUCN Red List, and it is threatened from deforestation; the population is thought to be decreasing. Illegal use of protected land for agriculture also contributes to loss of habitat.

The conservation status of the small-toothed palm civet is frequently debated, as sightings of the animal are rare making it difficult to establish a population estimate.
