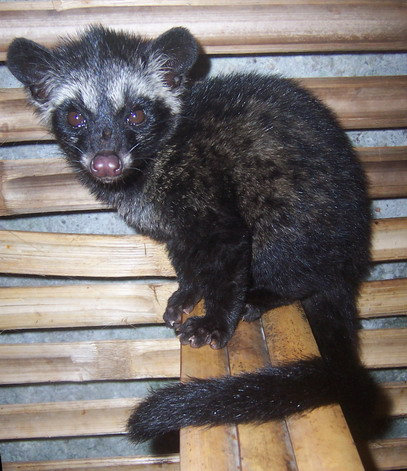
- Asian palm civet (Paradoxurus hermaphroditus)

Scientific classification
- Kingdom: Animalia
- Phylum: Chordata
- Class: Mammalia
- Order: Carnivora
- Family: Viverridae
- Subfamily: Paradoxurinae
- Genus: Paradoxurus; F. Cuvier, 1822

Type species
- Viverra hermaphrodita Pallas, 1777

Species
- see table
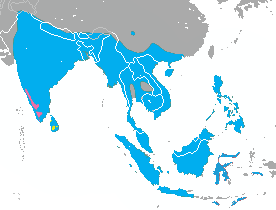
- Paradoxurus ranges

= Paradoxurus =

Genus of carnivores

Paradoxurus is a genus of five palm civets within the viverrid family that was denominated and first described by Frédéric Cuvier in 1822. The Paradoxurus species have a broad head, a narrow muzzle with a large rhinarium that is deeply sulcate in the middle. Their large ears are rounded at the tip. The tail is nearly as long as the head and body.

== Characteristics ==
Paradoxurus species have a broad head, a narrow muzzle with a large rhinarium that is deeply sulcate in the middle. Their large ears are rounded at the tip, the interior ridges and bursae are well developed. The skull exhibits marked muscular moulding, and the postorbital area is deeply constricted shortly behind the well-developed postorbital processes. It is considerably narrower than the interorbital area and than the muzzle above the canines. The dental formula is 3.1.4.23.1.4.2. The palate is not produced behind to cover the anterior half of the mesopterygoid fossa, and is flat and expanded between the posterior cheek teeth. The tail is nearly as long as the head and body, and about six times as long as the hind foot. Males do not have bacula.

== Taxonomy ==
In 2009, it was proposed to also include the golden wet-zone palm civet (P. aureus, F. Cuvier, 1822), the Sri Lankan brown palm civet (P. montanus, Kelaart, 1852) and the golden dry-zone palm civet (P. stenocephalus, Groves et al., 2009), which are endemic to Sri Lanka. A subsequent study found very low genetic diversity and no geographical structure within the golden palm civet and did not support the proposed split. In 2015, comparison of molecular and morphological data indicated that P. hermaphroditus comprised three major clades that should be recognized as separate species: namely one in the Indian subcontinent and Southeast Asia (as Paradoxurus hermaphroditus sensu stricto), one in Sumatra, Java and other small islands (Paradoxurus musanga), and the third in the Philippines and the Mentawai Islands (Paradoxurus philippinensis).

Genus Paradoxurus – Cuvier, 1822 – five species
| Common name | Scientific name and subspecies | Range | Size and ecology | IUCN status and estimated population |
|---|---|---|---|---|
| Northern palm civet | Paradoxurus hermaphroditus (Pallas, 1777) | Pakistan, India, Sri Lanka, Laos, Vietnam, South China and Thailand | Size: Habitat: Diet: | LC |
| Southern palm civet | Paradoxurus musanga (Raffles, 1821) | Myanmar, Cambodia, Vietnam, Thailand, Peninsular Malaysia, Sumatra, Nias, Java, Flores and Rote island | Size: Habitat: Diet: | LC |
| Philippine palm civet | Paradoxurus philippinensis (Jourdan, 1837) | Mentawai Islands, Borneo and the Philippines | Size: Habitat: Diet: | LC |
| Golden palm civet | Paradoxurus zeylonensis (Pallas, 1778) | Sri Lanka | Size: Habitat: Diet: | LC |
| Brown palm civet | Paradoxurus jerdoni Blanford, 1885 | Western Ghats, India | Size: Habitat: Diet: | LC |
