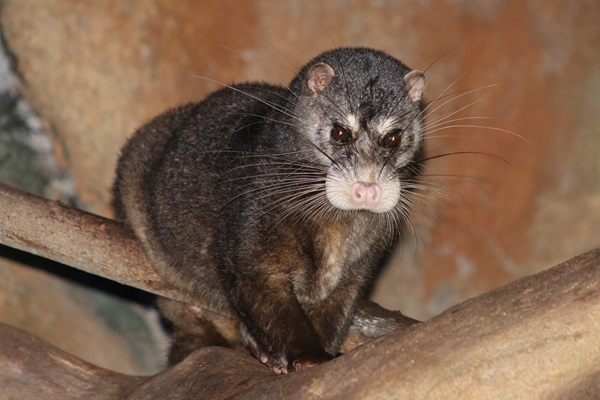

Conservation status
- Endangered (IUCN 3.1)
- CITES Appendix II

Scientific classification
- Kingdom: Animalia
- Phylum: Chordata
- Class: Mammalia
- Infraclass: Placentalia
- Order: Carnivora
- Family: Viverridae
- Genus: Cynogale; Gray, 1836
- Species: C. bennettii

Binomial name
- Cynogale bennettii Gray, 1836
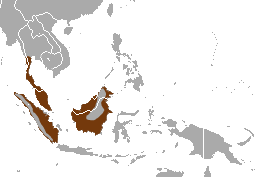
- Otter civet range

= Otter civet =

Species of carnivore

The otter civet (Cynogale bennettii) is a semiaquatic viverrid native to Thailand, Malaysia, Indonesia and Brunei. It is believed to be undergoing severe population decline due to habitat destruction and is classified as an endangered species by the IUCN Red List.

Cynogale is a monospecific genus.

== Characteristics ==
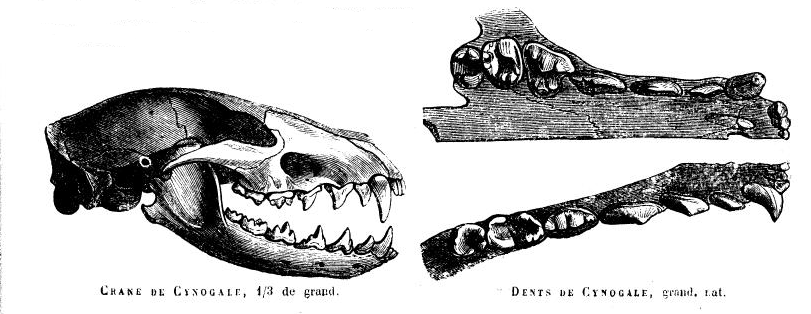
Skull and dentition, as illustrated in Gervais' Histoire naturelle des mammifères

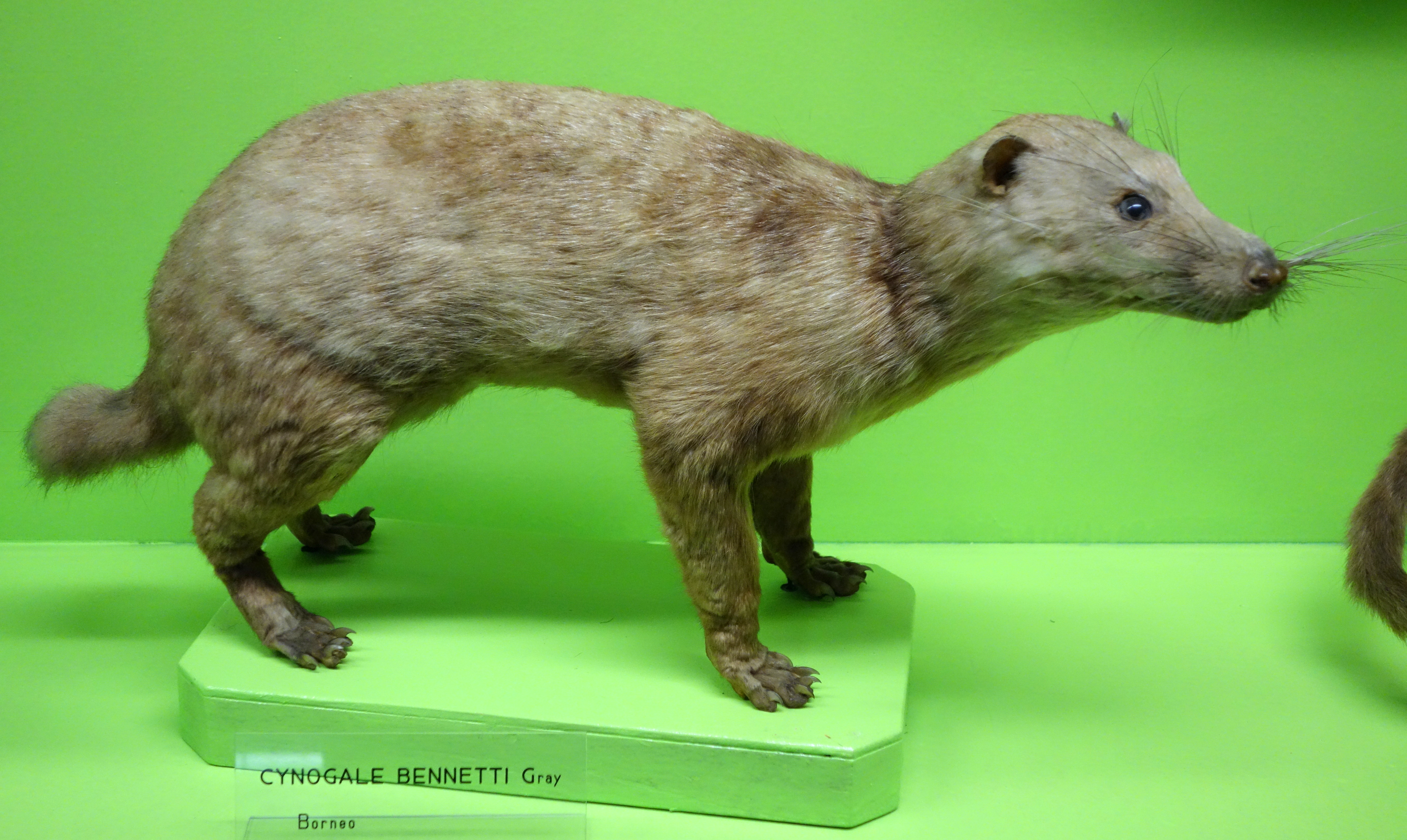
Museum specimen

The otter civet possesses webbed feet, which is an adaptation to its aquatic habitat. Its long, stiff whiskers may be used for foraging.

== Distribution and habitat ==
Otter civets are distributed in Sumatra, Borneo and peninsular Thailand. Lowland primary forest is apparently the ideal habitat for the species, although it is also known to occur in secondary forest. Their presence in northern Vietnam is uncertain. They are believed to prefer peat swamp forests, but have been sighted at low elevations in tropical dry forests.

In March 2005, an otter civet was photographed by a camera trap within an acacia plantation in central Sarawak during 1,632 trap-nights. Between July 2008 and January 2009, ten otter civets were photographed in an area of about 112 km^{2} (43 sq mi) in Sabah's Deramakot Forest Reserve, a lowland tropical rainforest in Borneo ranging in altitude from 60–250 m (200–820 ft). In May 2009, the presence of otter civets was documented for the first time in central Kalimantan, where two individuals were photographed in the Sabangau Peat-swamp Forest at an elevation of about 11 m (36 ft).

== Ecology and behaviour ==
The otter civet is a nocturnal species that obtains most of its food from the water, feeding on fish, crabs and freshwater mollusks. It can also climb to feed on birds and fruit. Given its rarity and secretive nature it is a very poorly known species.

== Threats ==
The otter civet is threatened by habitat destruction – specifically, the destruction of peat swamp forests to make way for oil palm plantations. It is sometimes caught in snares intended to catch other species.

== Conservation ==
Cynogale bennettii is listed in CITES Appendix II.
