= Ernst Schwarz (zoologist) =

German zoologist, mammalogist, and herpetologist (1889–1962)

Ernst Schwarz (1 December 1889 – 23 September 1962) was a German zoologist, mammalogist, and herpetologist.

Schwarz was born in Frankfurt and studied zoology in Munich. He worked at the Museum of Natural History in Frankfurt and the Zoological Museum in Berlin. In 1929 he became professor of zoology at the University of Greifswald. He worked at the Natural History Museum in London from 1933 to 1937, when he moved to the United States. He specialised in great ape species.

He is often credited with having discovered the Bonobo in 1928.

Schwarz also studied amphibians and reptiles, especially European and Mediterranean vipers.
