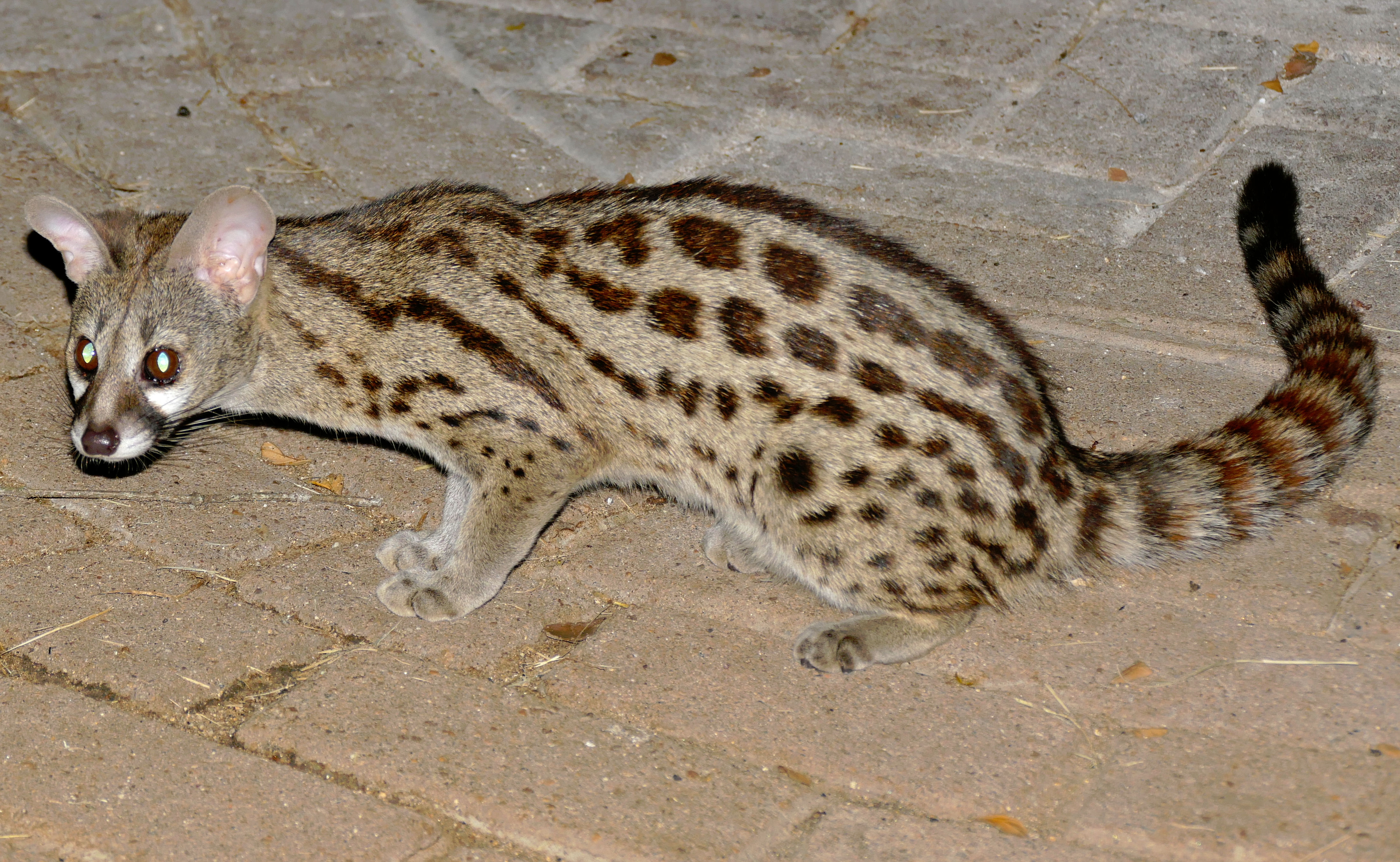
- Cape genet

Scientific classification
- Kingdom: Animalia
- Phylum: Chordata
- Class: Mammalia
- Order: Carnivora
- Family: Viverridae
- Subfamily: Genettinae; Gray, 1864

Genera
- See text

= Genettinae =

Subfamily of carnivorans

Genettinae is a subfamily of the feliform viverrids. It contains all of the genet species (genus Genetta) and the oyan species (genus Poiana).

== Classification ==
=== Living species ===
Genus	Species	IUCN Red List status and distribution
Genetta Cuvier, 1816	Common genet (G. genetta) (Linnaeus, 1758)	LC
Genetta Cuvier, 1816	Cape genet (G. tigrina) (Schreber, 1778)	LC
Genetta Cuvier, 1816	South African small-spotted genet (G. felina) (Thunberg, 1811)	
Genetta Cuvier, 1816	Rusty-spotted genet (G. maculata) (Gray, 1828)	LC
Genetta Cuvier, 1816	Pardine genet (G. pardina) Geoffroy Saint-Hilaire, 1832	LC
Genetta Cuvier, 1816	Abyssinian genet (G. abyssinica) (Rüppell, 1835)	DD
Genetta Cuvier, 1816	King genet (G. poensis) Waterhouse, 1838	DD
Genetta Cuvier, 1816	Servaline genet (G. servalina) Pucheran, 1855	LC
Genetta Cuvier, 1816	Angolan genet (G. angolensis) Bocage, 1882	LC
Genetta Cuvier, 1816	Giant forest genet (G. victoriae) Thomas, 1901	LC
Genetta Cuvier, 1816	Hausa genet (G. thierryi) Matschie, 1902	LC
Genetta Cuvier, 1816	Letaba genet (G. letabae) Thomas and Schwann, 1906	
Genetta Cuvier, 1816	Johnston's genet (G. johnstoni) (Pocock, 1908)	NT
Genetta Cuvier, 1816	Aquatic genet (G. piscivora) (Allen, 1919)	NT
Genetta Cuvier, 1816	Crested servaline genet (G. cristata) Hayman, 1940	VU
Genetta Cuvier, 1816	Schouteden's genet (G. schoutedeni) Crawford-Cabral, 1970	
Genetta Cuvier, 1816	Bourlon's genet (G. bourloni) Gaubert, 2003	VU
Poiana Gray, 1864	Central African oyan (P. richardsonii) (Thomson, 1842)	LC
Poiana Gray, 1864	West African oyan (P. leightoni) (Pocock, 1907)	VU

=== Phylogeny ===
The phylogenetic relationships of Genettinae are shown in the following cladogram:

- Genettinae
  - Poiana
    - West African oyan P. leightoni
    - Central African oyan P. richardsonii
  - Genetta
    - - Abyssinian genet G. abyssinica
      - Haussa genet G. thierryi
    - - Giant forest genet G. victoriae
      - - Johnston's genet G. johnstoni
        - - - - Aquatic genet G. piscivora
              - Servaline genet G. servalina
            - Crested servaline genet G. cristata
          - - South African small-spotted genet G. felina
            - Common genet G. genetta
            - - Cape genet G. tigrina
              - - Letaba genet G. letabae
                - Schouteden's genet G. schoutedeni
                - Rusty-spotted genet G. maculata
                - - - Angolan genet G. angolensis
                    - Pardine genet G. pardina
                  - - Bourlon's genet G. bourloni
                    - King genet G. poensis
