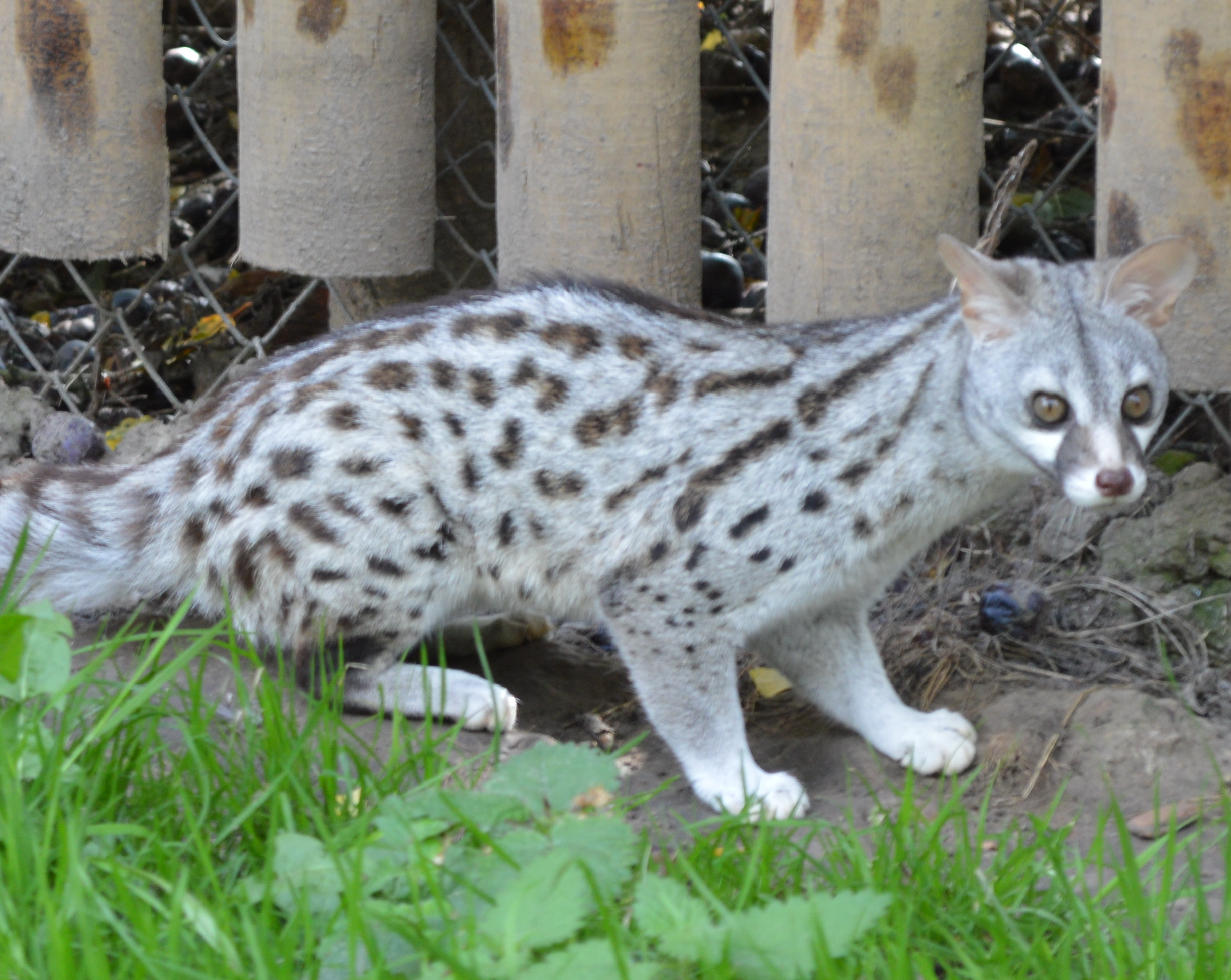

Conservation status
- Least Concern (IUCN 3.1)

Scientific classification
- Kingdom: Animalia
- Phylum: Chordata
- Class: Mammalia
- Order: Carnivora
- Family: Viverridae
- Genus: Genetta
- Species: G. pardina

Binomial name
- Genetta pardina I. Geoffroy Saint-Hilaire, 1832
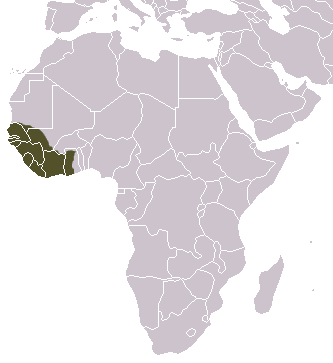
- Pardine genet range

Synonyms
- Genetta amer Gray, 1843; Genetta dubia Matschie, 1902; Genetta genettoides Temminck, 1853; Genetta pantherina Hamilton-Smith, 1842

= Pardine genet =

Species of carnivore

The pardine genet (Genetta pardina), also known as the West African large spotted genet, is a genet species living in West Africa. As it is widely distributed and common, it is listed as Least Concern on the IUCN Red List.

== Characteristics ==
The pardine genet's fur is yellowish grey with round black spots, which are bigger on the hind legs than on the shoulders. Its head is more reddish, and the muzzle brownish. It has white spots under each eye and below the chin. Its ears are grey. Its tail has six to seven narrow white and six to seven broader black rings. The tip of the tail is black.

Measurements of adult males range from 410 to 553 mm (16.1 to 21.8 in) in head and body with a 390 to 490 mm (15 to 19 in) long tail. Adult females range from 410 to 530 mm (16 to 21 in) in head and body with a 420 to 450 mm (17 to 18 in) long tail.

== Distribution and habitat ==
Pardine genets are distributed from Senegal eastwards to Ghana, where the Volta River is possibly a barrier to dispersal. They live in rainforests, gallery forests, moist woodlands, but also in plantations. They also venture into suburbs.

== Ecology and behavior ==
Pardine genets are solitary, and active at night. They are very adept at climbing trees.

== Threats ==
Major threats to pardine genets are not known. Heads and skins of pardine genets have been recorded in local markets in Benin, where they are used as fetish.

== In captivity ==
Captive pardine genets are currently kept in 5 collections in the UK, Shepreth Wildlife Park, Wingham Wildlife Park, All Things Wild, Wild Animal Adventures in Stockton and Wild Discovery in Wrea Green. Napoli Zoo in Italy has also kept them since 2015.

== Taxonomy ==
This pardine genet was considered synonymous with other species of large-spotted genets, namely the Rusty-spotted genet Genetta maculata and the Cape Genet Genetta tigrina, but all three are now each recognised as distinct species.
