= Genetta nyakitongwer =

Genetta nyakitongwer Temporal range: 1.87–1.56 Ma Pleistocene

Scientific classification
- Kingdom: Animalia
- Phylum: Chordata
- Class: Mammalia
- Order: Carnivora
- Family: Viverridae
- Genus: Genetta
- Species: †G. nyakitongwer

Binomial name
- †Genetta nyakitongwer Werdelin & Lewis, 2013

Extinct species of genet of the Pleistocene

Genetta nyakitongwer is a species of extinct genet known from Koobi Fora in Kenya. It is known only from a single specimen, a left lower jaw with five preserved teeth. It probably dates to between 1.87 and 1.56 million years ago. The species was named in 2013 by paleontologists Lars Werdelin and Margaret E. Lewis. The specific name, nyakitongwer, is the word for "genet" in the local Daasanach language.

The only known specimen preserves the alveolus of the first lower premolar (p1), the broken second premolar (p2), the complete third premolar through first molar (p3, p4, and m1), and the broken second molar (m2). Its status as a separate species rests on its large size: it is far larger than any other genet except the giant forest genet (Genetta victoriae), the largest living genet, and it has more robust teeth than even the giant forest genet. In addition, the front part of the m1 (the trigonid) is narrower than the back part (the talonid).
