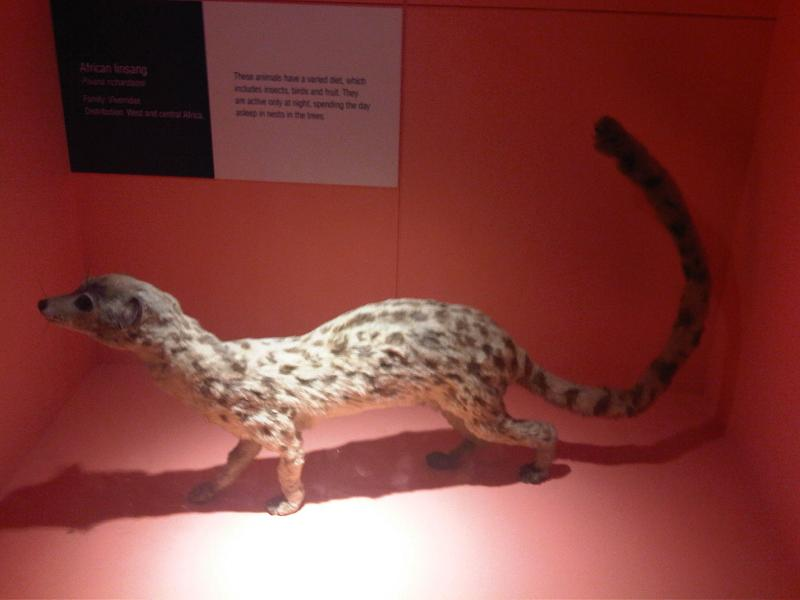

Conservation status
- Least Concern (IUCN 3.1)

Scientific classification
- Kingdom: Animalia
- Phylum: Chordata
- Class: Mammalia
- Order: Carnivora
- Family: Viverridae
- Genus: Poiana
- Species: P. richardsonii

Binomial name
- Poiana richardsonii (Thomson, 1842)
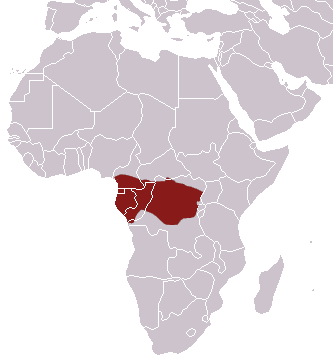
- Central African oyan range

= Central African oyan =

Species of carnivore

The Central African oyan (Poiana richardsonii), also called Central African linsang, is a linsang species native to Central Africa.

== Characteristics ==
The Central African oyan's body is slender and long, with an elongated head and a pointed muzzle. Its fur is yellowish to reddish brown with darker spots on the back and flanks. Its throat and belly are lighter in colour and without spots. Its tail has 9 to 14 dark rings. Its body is 33–43 cm (13–17 in) long, and the tail about the same length. Its legs are short, and the soles of its feet hairy. Females are slightly smaller than males.

== Distribution and habitat ==
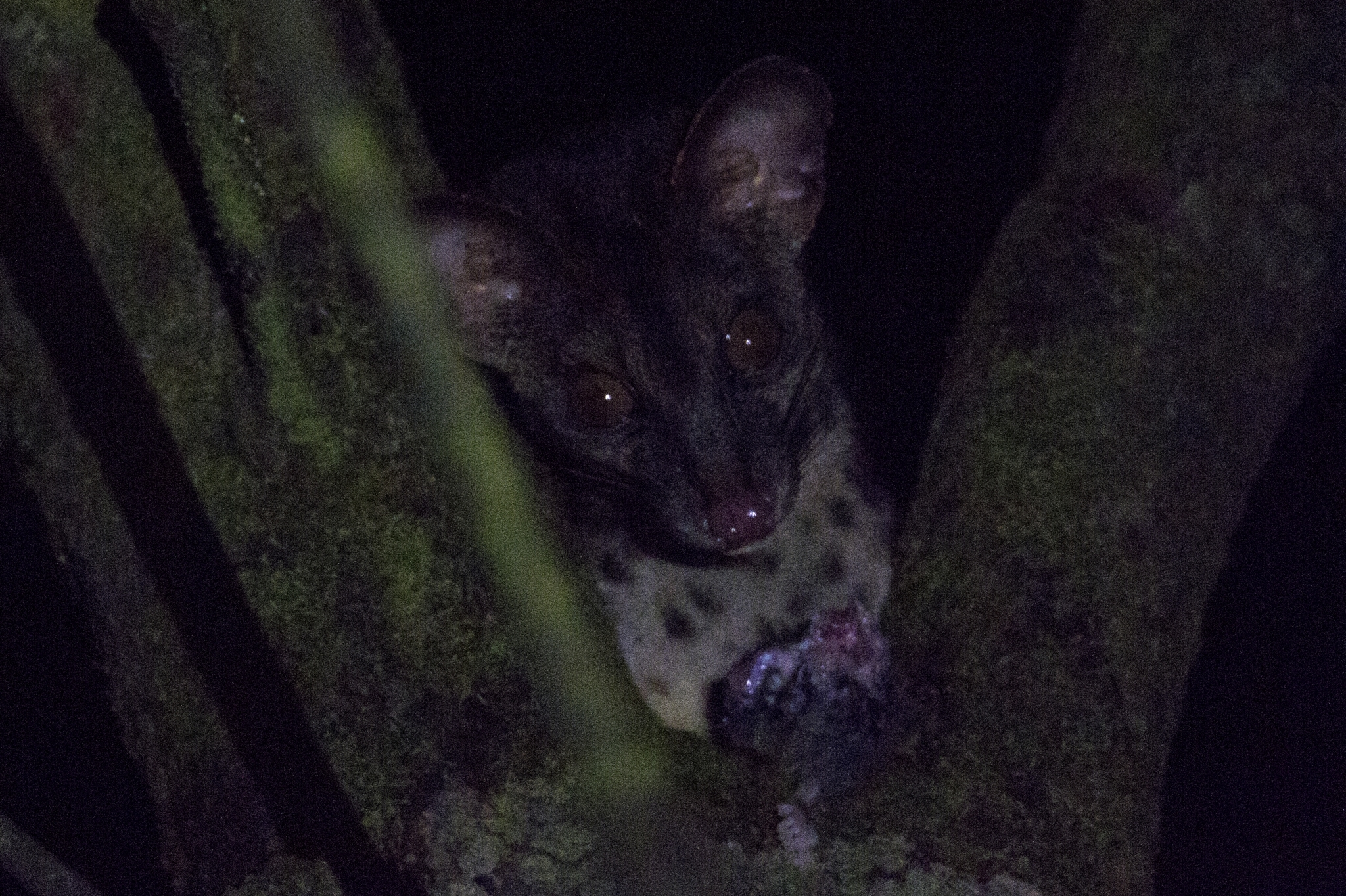
Central African Oyan

The Central African oyan is endemic to Cameroon, Equatorial Guinea, Gabon, the Central African Republic, the Republic of the Congo, and the Democratic Republic of the Congo east to the Albertine Rift. It lives in lowland and montane tropical rainforests. In Gabon, a camera-trap recorded an individual on the forest floor. In Gabon's Moukalaba-Doudou National Park, it was also recorded only in forested areas.

== Behaviour and ecology ==
The Central African oyan lives foremost in the canopy, but has rarely been observed on the ground. It is nocturnal and hunts small rodents and birds, but also feeds on insects.

Its breeding habits are unknown.

== Taxonomy ==
The Central African oyan or "Richardson's genette" was first described in 1842 as Genetta richardsonii, in honour of John Richardson, by T. R. H. Thomson, based on a zoological specimen collected in Fernando Po. In an 1864 paper, published the following year, John Edward Gray transferred the species from Genetta to his newly erected genus Poiana. In 1907, Oldfield Thomas and Robert Charles Wroughton described a new subspecies, Poiana Richardsoni ochracea, in the original orthography, from the area of the Aruwimi River near Yambuya, in what is now the Democratic Republic of the Congo. In a paper read at the 26 November 1907 meeting of the Zoological Society of London and published the following year, Reginald Innes Pocock described a further subspecies based on a specimen collected in Liberia, Poiana richardsoni leightoni, but in 1974 Donovan Reginald Rosevear elevated "Leighton's linsang" or the West African oyan from subspecies to independent species rank.

Two subspecies are recognized:

- Poiana richardsonii richardsonii (Thomson, 1842)
- Poiana richardsonii ochracea Thomas and Wroughton, 1907

== Threats ==
The Central African oyan is possibly threatened by deforestation and bushmeat hunting.
