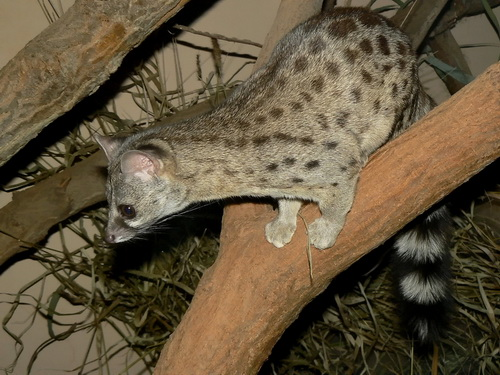

Conservation status
- Least Concern (IUCN 3.1)

Scientific classification
- Kingdom: Animalia
- Phylum: Chordata
- Class: Mammalia
- Order: Carnivora
- Family: Viverridae
- Genus: Genetta
- Species: G. thierryi

Binomial name
- Genetta thierryi Matschie, 1902
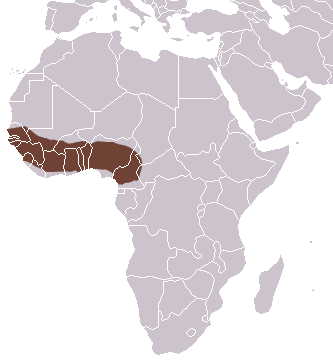
- Hausa genet range

= Hausa genet =

Species of carnivoran

The Hausa genet (Genetta thierryi) is a genet species native to West African savannas. It is listed as Least Concern on the IUCN Red List.

Hausa genets have been sighted in Senegal's wooded steppes, in moist woodlands in Guinea-Bissau, and in rainforest in Sierra Leone, Ghana and Ivory Coast.

== Characteristics ==
The Hausa genet has a bright colored fur with short hair. A brown-rufous continuous line along its back is longitudinally crossed by a brighter colored line. Its feet are as bright as the ground coloration. Its tail is banded with dark and bright rings and a black tip. Its marking consist of two rows of elongated dorsal spots. The spots on shoulder, thigh and flank are smaller and darker. Its forelimbs and hindlimbs are not spotted. It differs in colouring and length of hair in relation to its habitat, the pelage being shorter and paler in savannah-type habitat, and longer and darker (more yellow) in forest habitat. The guard hairs at the base of the spatula are round, or very slightly ovoid, which is unique among genets.

== Distribution and habitat ==
The Hausa genet is native to Gambia, Guinea-Bissau and Cameroon, where it inhabits moist and dry savannas with open woodlands. It has also been sighted in dry wooded steppes in Senegal, and in rainforest in Sierra Leone, Ghana and Côte d'Ivoire.

== Ecology and behavior ==
The ecology of the Hausa genet has been little studied. Its foraging behaviour and diet is likely to be similar to that of other genets. Its breeding behaviour is also unknown, but these genets are thought to make dens among boulders or in holes dug into the ground. A juvenile was found sleeping in a hollow tree, and two half-grown animals were found in Mali in November, which may indicate that pups were born between January and March.

== Threats ==
It is hunted in some areas and sometimes seen on display as bushmeat. The scale and impact of this threat is not known.
