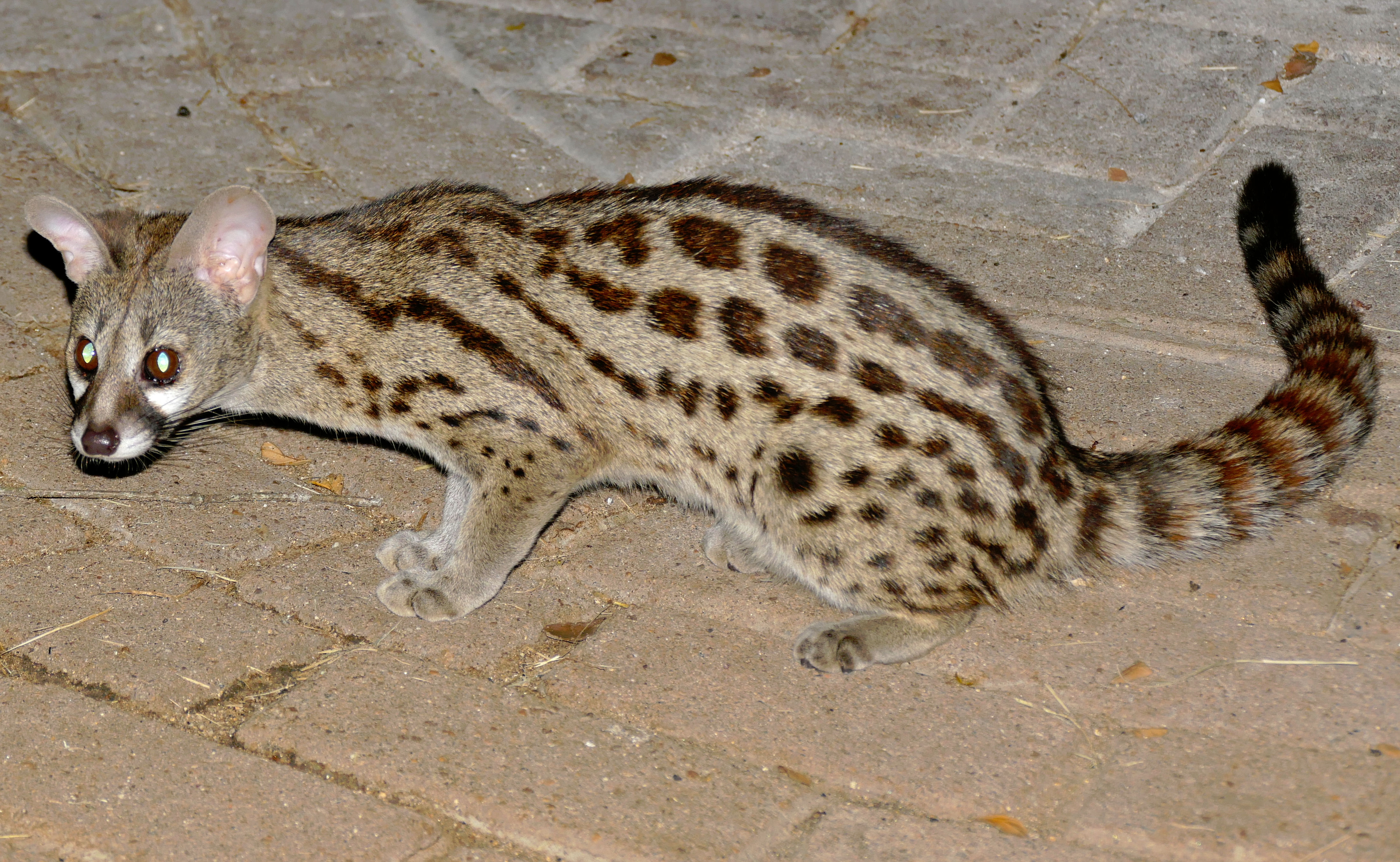

Scientific classification
- Kingdom: Animalia
- Phylum: Chordata
- Class: Mammalia
- Infraclass: Placentalia
- Order: Carnivora
- Family: Viverridae
- Subfamily: Genettinae
- Genus: Genetta; Cuvier, 1816

Type species
- Viverra genetta Linnaeus, 1758

Species
- See text
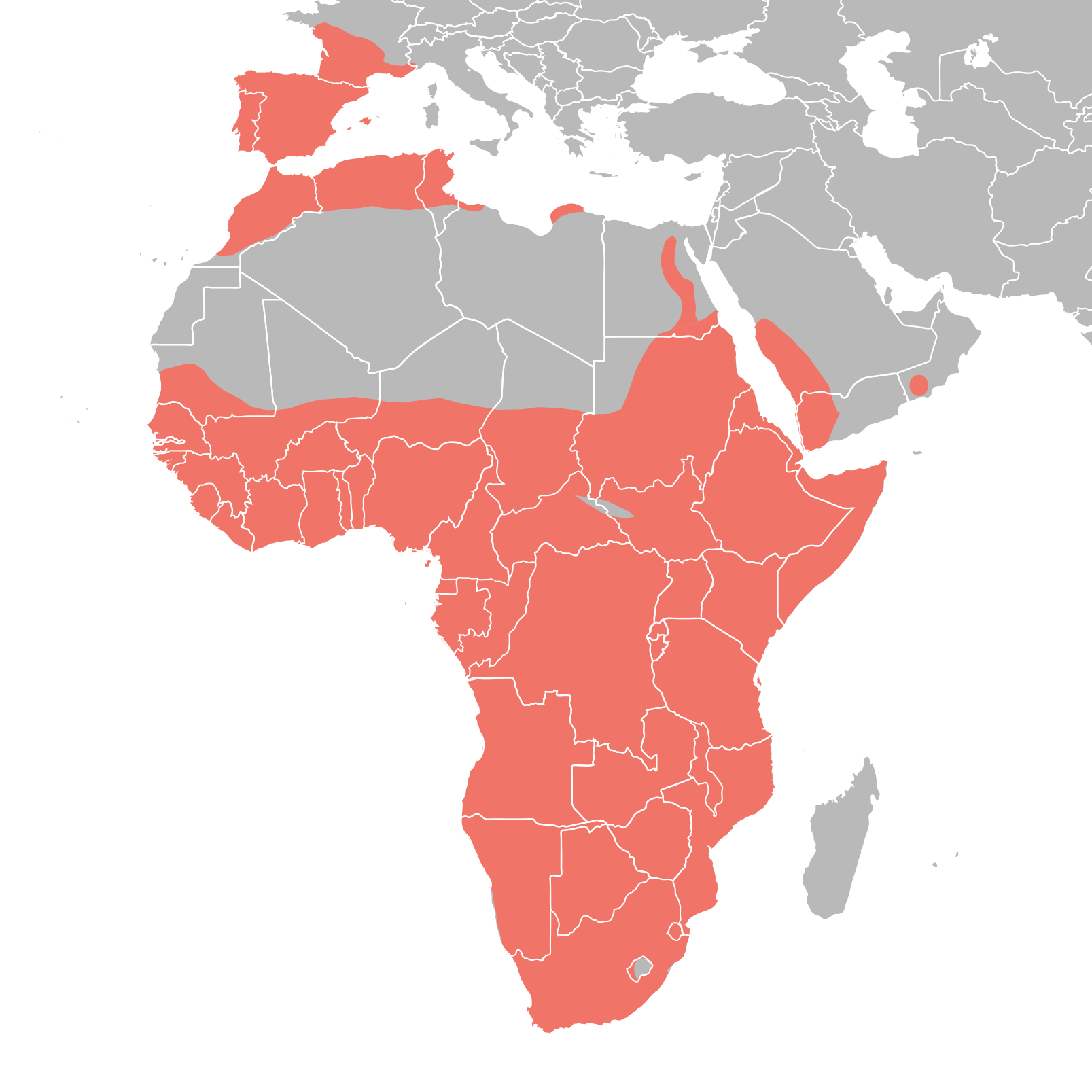
- Genetta distribution

= Genet (animal) =

Genet Temporal range: Pliocene–Recent

Genus of carnivorans

A genet (pronounced /ˈdʒɛnɪt/ or /dʒəˈnɛt/) is a member of the genus Genetta, which consists of 17 species of small African carnivorans. The common genet is the only genet present in Europe and occurs in the Iberian Peninsula, Italy and France.

Genet fossils from the Late Miocene and later have been found at sites in Ethiopia, Kenya and Morocco.

== Classification ==
Genetta was named and described by Frédéric Cuvier in 1816. The number of species in the genus is controversial. The following were proposed as valid in 2005:

Image	Name	Habitat	Distribution and IUCN Red List status
	Common genet (G. genetta) (Linnaeus, 1758)	Wooded habitats and savannah	LC
	South African small-spotted genet (G. felina) (Thunberg), 1811	Woodland savanna, grassland, thickets, dry vlei areas	
	Abyssinian genet (G. abyssinica) (Rüppell, 1835)	Montane dry forest up to 3,750 m (12,300 ft)	DD
	Cape genet (G. tigrina) (Schreber, 1778)	Fynbos, grassland and coastal forests	LC
	Angolan genet (G. angolensis) Bocage, 1882	Open miombo forest	LC
	Giant forest genet (G. victoriae) Thomas, 1901	Rainforests	LC
	Hausa genet (G. thierryi) Matschie, 1902	Savannah and moist woodlands	LC
	Johnston's genet (G. johnstoni) Pocock, 1907	Dense rainforest	NT
	Bourlon's genet (G. bourloni) Gaubert, 2003	Rainforests	VU
	Pardine genet (G. pardina) Geoffroy Saint-Hilaire, 1832	primary and secondary rainforests, gallery forests, moist woodlands, plantations, and suburban areas	LC
	King genet (G. poensis) Waterhouse, 1838	Rainforest	DD
	Rusty-spotted genet (G. maculata) (Gray, 1830)	Woodland savannah, savannah-forest mosaic, rain forest and montane forest up to 3,400 m (11,200 ft)	LC
	Letaba genet (G. letabae) Thomas and Schwann, 1906	Woodland savannah	
	Schouteden's genet (G. schoutedeni) Crawford-Cabral, 1970	Rainforest, woodland savannah and savannah-forest mosaic	
	Servaline genet (G. servalina) Pucheran, 1855	Lowland forests to high-altitude bamboo forest and coral rag thicket	LC
	Crested servaline genet (G. cristata) Hayman, 1940	Scrub and primary deciduous forests	VU
	Aquatic genet (G. piscivora) (Allen), 1919	Rainforests	NT

=== Extinct species ===
- †Genetta nyakitongwer – Early Pleistocene of Kenya
- †Genetta plesictoides – Late Pleistocene of Cyprus

Genetta and Poiana are estimated to have diverged about 9.5 to 13.3 million years ago. Genetta species are estimated to have diverged at least 8.5 million years ago starting with the Hausa genet, followed by the giant genet 3.98 to 6.01 million years ago.

== Characteristics ==
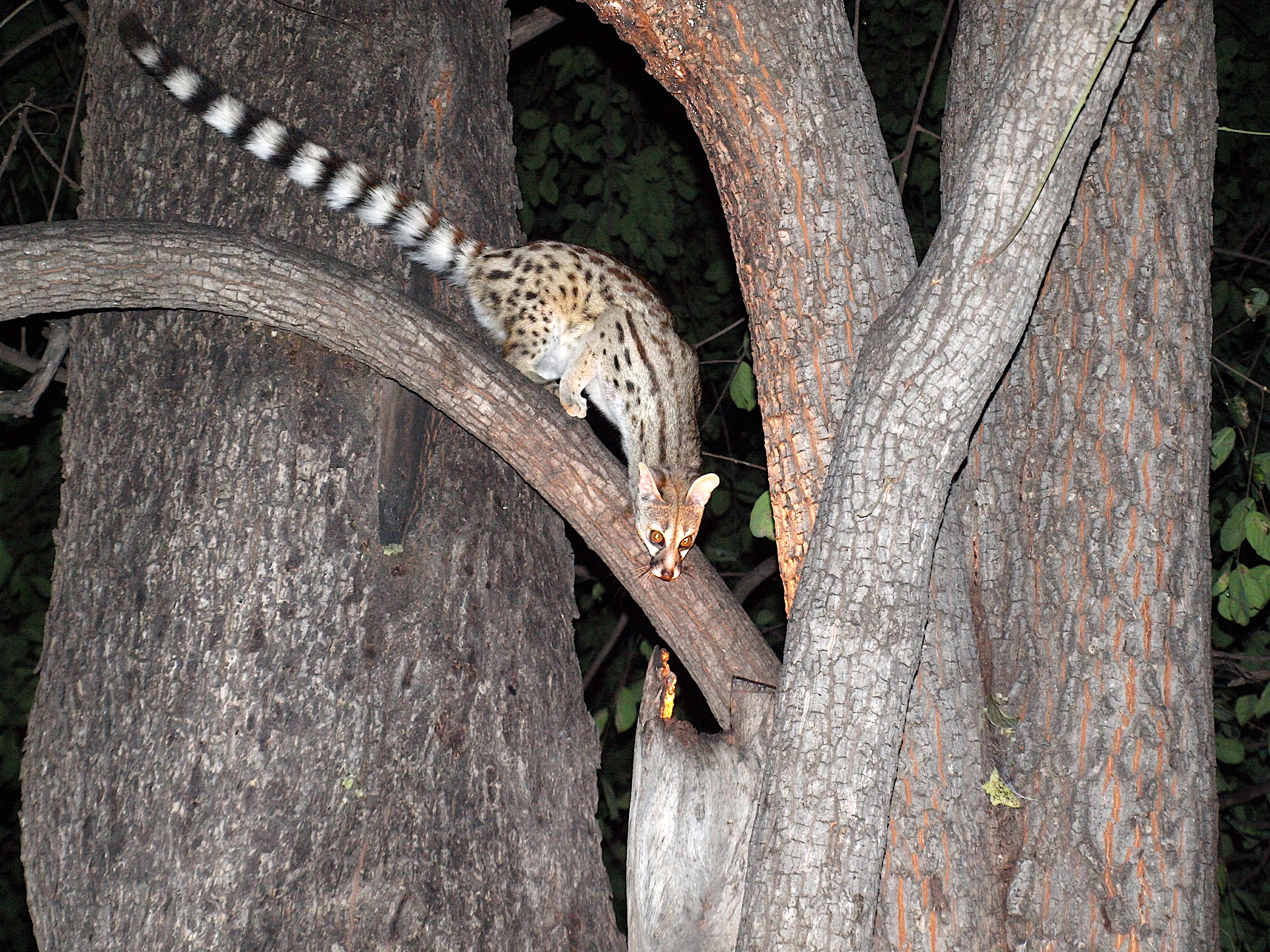
Genet

Genets are slender cat-like animals with a long body, a long ringed tail, large ears, a pointed muzzle and partly retractile claws. Their fur is spotted, but melanistic genets have also been recorded. They have musk glands and anal sacs. They also have perineal glands.

All genet species have a dark stripe along the spine; they differ in fur color and spot pattern. Their size varies between species from 40.9 to 60 cm (16.1 to 23.6 in) in head-to-body length with 40 to 47 cm (16 to 19 in) long tails; their tails are almost as long as head and body. They have large eyes with elliptical pupils; the iris is about the color of the fur. They can move their eyes within their sockets to a limited extent, and move their heads to focus on moving objects. Their pinnae have a fine layer of hair inside and outside. They can move the pinnae by about 80° from pointing forward to the side, and also from an erect position to pointing downwards. Their rhinarium is important for both sensing smell and touch.

== Distribution and habitat ==
All genet species are indigenous to Africa. The common genet was introduced to southwestern Europe during historical times. It was brought from the Maghreb to Spain as a semi-domestic animal about 1000 to 1500 years ago, and from there spread to southern France and Italy. In Africa, it inhabits wooded habitats north of the Sahara, in savanna zones south of the Sahara to southern Africa and along the coast of Arabia, Yemen and Oman.

== Ecology and behavior ==
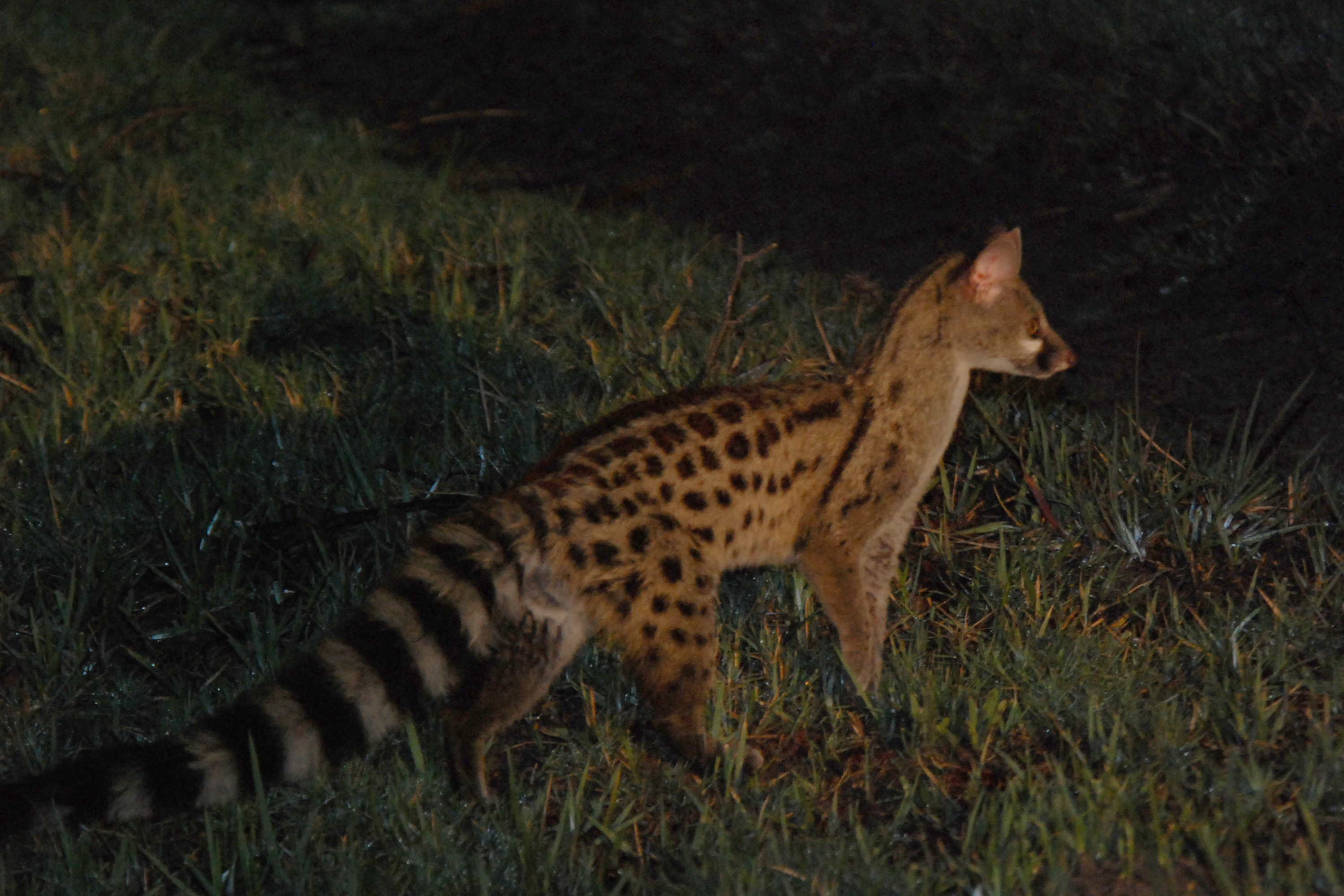
Genet photographed in Botswana

Genets are highly agile, have quick reflexes and exceptional climbing skills. They are the only viverrids able to stand on their hind legs. They walk, trot, run, climb up and down trees, and jump. They live on the ground, but also spend much of their time in trees. They are considered solitary, except during mating and when females have offspring.

They are omnivorous and opportunistically catch invertebrates and small vertebrates, but also feed on plants and fruit. Aquatic genets feed mainly on fish. Angolan genets are thought to feed on grasshoppers and other arthropods. Johnston's genet probably feeds mainly on insects.

In 2014, a camera trap in the Hluhluwe–Imfolozi Park captured a large spotted genet riding on the back of two different buffalo and a rhinoceros. This was the first time a genet was recorded hitch-hiking.

Females have up to five young in a litter. They rear their young alone.

Common genet females become sexually mature at the age of two years. After copulation, the gestation period lasts for 10 to 11 weeks. They are diestrous and give birth twice a year, during spring and late summer to autumn. Captive common genets have been known to live up to 13 years. A male genet lived for 22.7 years in captivity.

== Threats ==
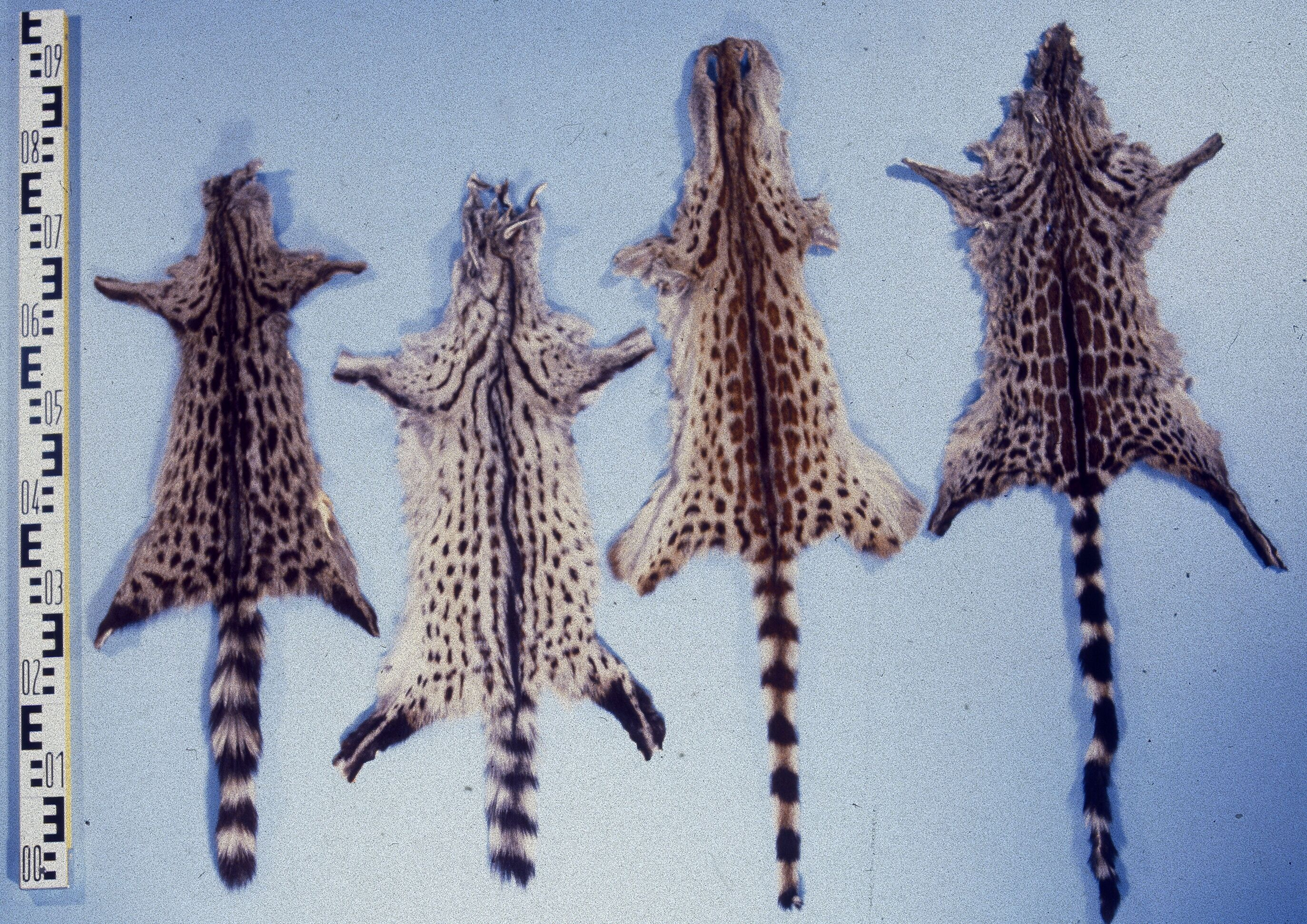
Skins of G. genetta and G. tigrina

Loss of habitat due to deforestation and conversion of land to agriculture is a major threat for the crested servaline genet and Johnston's genet. Both genet species are also hunted for meat and skins. They are listed as Vulnerable on the IUCN Red Lists. These are also major threats for Bourlon's genet, which is classified as Near Threatened.

The aquatic genet may be affected by hunting, but major threats have not yet been identified. It is listed as Near Threatened on the IUCN Red List.

The king genet and the Abyssinian genet are so poorly known that threats cannot be identified. Both are listed as Data Deficient on the IUCN Red Lists.

The remaining genet species are not considered threatened and are listed as Least Concern on the IUCN Red Lists.

== Etymology ==
The etymological origin of the word 'genet' is uncertain; it may be a derivation of the Arabic name djarnet. The English word comes from Old French 'genete', which came from Spanish 'gineta'.

== In captivity ==
Most genets that are kept as pets are common genets, rusty-spotted genets or Cape genets. As enforced by the Centers for Disease Control and Prevention (CDC), keeping a genet as a pet is prohibited in certain states in the US. Some states have specific laws regarding the possession of exotic pets. Genet prices can exceed $1500 for both the purchase and shipment of the animal. Genets are not suited to life in captivity, and it is not recommended to keep one as a pet. They are solitary animals in the wild and will not get along well with other common household pets such as cats or dogs.
