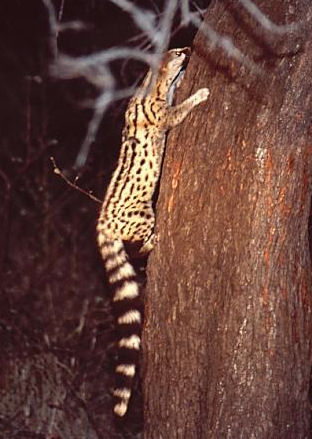

Conservation status
- Least Concern (IUCN 3.1)

Scientific classification
- Kingdom: Animalia
- Phylum: Chordata
- Class: Mammalia
- Order: Carnivora
- Family: Viverridae
- Genus: Genetta
- Species: G. angolensis

Binomial name
- Genetta angolensis Bocage, 1882
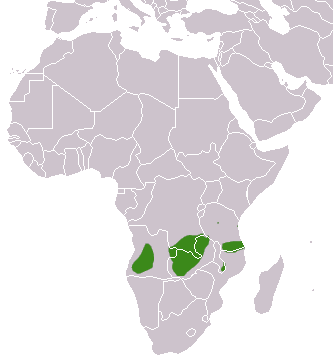
- Angolan genet range

Synonyms
- Genetta hintoni Schwarz, 1929; Genetta mossambica Matschie, 1902

= Angolan genet =

Species of mammal

The Angolan genet or miombo genet (Genetta angolensis) is a genet species endemic to Southern Africa. It is considered common in this region and therefore listed as Least Concern in the IUCN Red List. Little is known about its ecology.

== Characteristics ==
The Angolan genet has long light brown coloured fur with dark spots and a continuous dark crested line across the back. Its throat and chest are light grey to greyish black. It has small spots on the front and shoulders. The spots are more numerous and slightly bigger on the sides. In head-to-body length, it ranges from 44 to 48 cm (17 to 19 in). Its bushy 38 to 43 cm (15 to 17 in) long tail is ringed with a dark tip. Its legs are dark at the back. It has a dark grey face, a black muzzle and is white around the eyes and mouth. Its crest on the back is up to 6 cm (2.4 in) long. It is distinguished from the common genet by the black rather than white tip to the tail and more irregular blotching and spotting on the coat. Melanistic individuals have been recorded in some areas.

The male of the species is larger than the female.

== Distribution and habitat ==
The Angolan genet occurs in Angola, Democratic Republic of the Congo, Malawi, Mozambique, Tanzania, Zambia and Zimbabwe. It lives in a variety of environments in its range, including both the local miombo woodlands and plains. During camera-trapping and transect surveys in Tanzania between 2007 and 2012, the Angolan genet was recorded north of Katavi National Park and in the Rukwa Region.

== Threats ==
The Angolan genet is not considered threatened by habitat change, but might be negatively affected by road traffic. In Tanzania, traditional healers use the Angolan genet in their practices. Some individuals are poached for this practise.
