= Togo leaf-toed gecko =

Conservation status
- Least Concern (IUCN 3.1)

Scientific classification
- Kingdom: Animalia
- Phylum: Chordata
- Class: Reptilia
- Order: Squamata
- Suborder: Gekkota
- Family: Gekkonidae
- Genus: Hemidactylus
- Species: H. matschiei

Binomial name
- Hemidactylus matschiei (Tornier, 1901)

Synonyms
- Bunocnemis matschiei Tornier, 1901; Hemidactylus matschiei — Loveridge, 1947

Species of lizard

The Togo leaf-toed gecko (Hemidactylus matschiei) is a species of gecko, a lizard in the family Gekkonidae. The species is native to West Africa.

== Etymology ==
The specific name, matschiei, is in honor of German zoologist Paul Matschie.

== Geographic distribution ==
Hemidactylus matschiei is found in Nigeria and Togo.

== Habitat ==
The preferred natural habitat of Hemidactylus matschiei is savanna.

== Behavior ==
Hemidactylus matschiei is nocturnal.

== Reproduction ==
Hemidactylus matschiei is oviparous.
