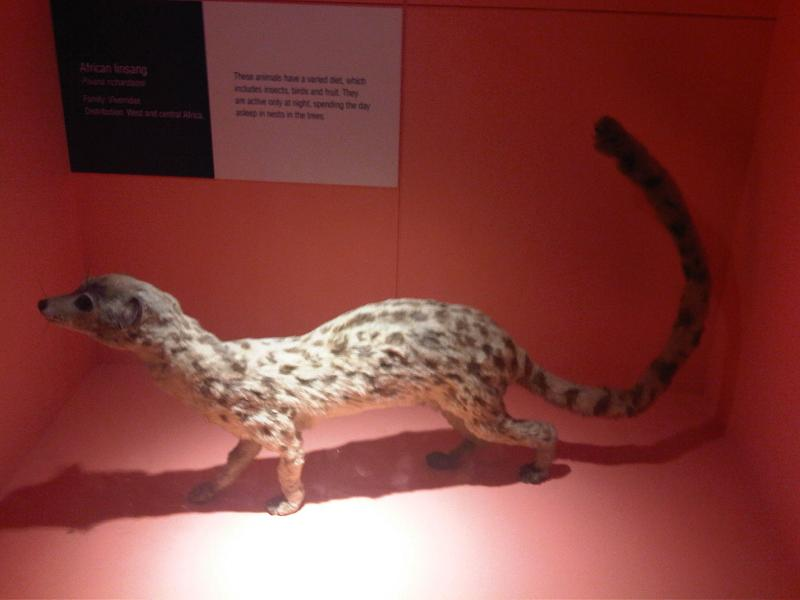
- Central African oyan (Poiana richardsonii)

Scientific classification
- Kingdom: Animalia
- Phylum: Chordata
- Class: Mammalia
- Order: Carnivora
- Family: Viverridae
- Subfamily: Genettinae
- Genus: Poiana; Gray, 1865

Type species
- Genetta richardsonii

Species
- Poiana leightoni; Poiana richardsonii
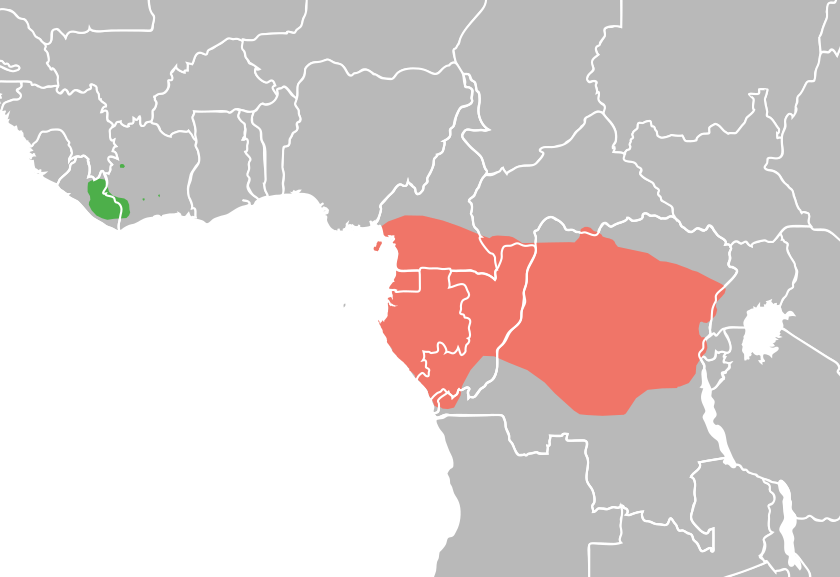
- Poiana distribution P. leightoni in green, P. richardsonii in red

= Poiana (genus) =

Genus of carnivores

The genus Poiana consists of two species of viverrids native to West and Central Africa, the West African oyan (P. leightoni) and the Central African oyan (P. richardsonii), commonly known as oyans.

== Taxonomy ==
The genus Poiana was proposed by John Edward Gray in 1864 and published the following year. In accordance with Article 8 of the International Code of Zoological Nomenclature, the correct author citation is "Gray, 1865".

Both linsang genera Poiana and Prionodon were formerly placed in the subfamily Viverrinae of the Viverridae, along with several other genera, but recent research suggests that their actual relationships may be somewhat different; a 2020 checklist places them instead in the subfamily Genettinae. The linsangs are remarkable for their morphological resemblance to the family Felidae, which is greater than in the other viverrids. As the relationship between linsangs and felids was thought to be rather distant, this was considered an example of convergent evolution. However, DNA analysis indicates that while the African linsangs (Poiana) are true viverrids closely related to the genets, the Asiatic linsangs (Prionodon) are not and may instead be the closest living relatives of the Felidae.
