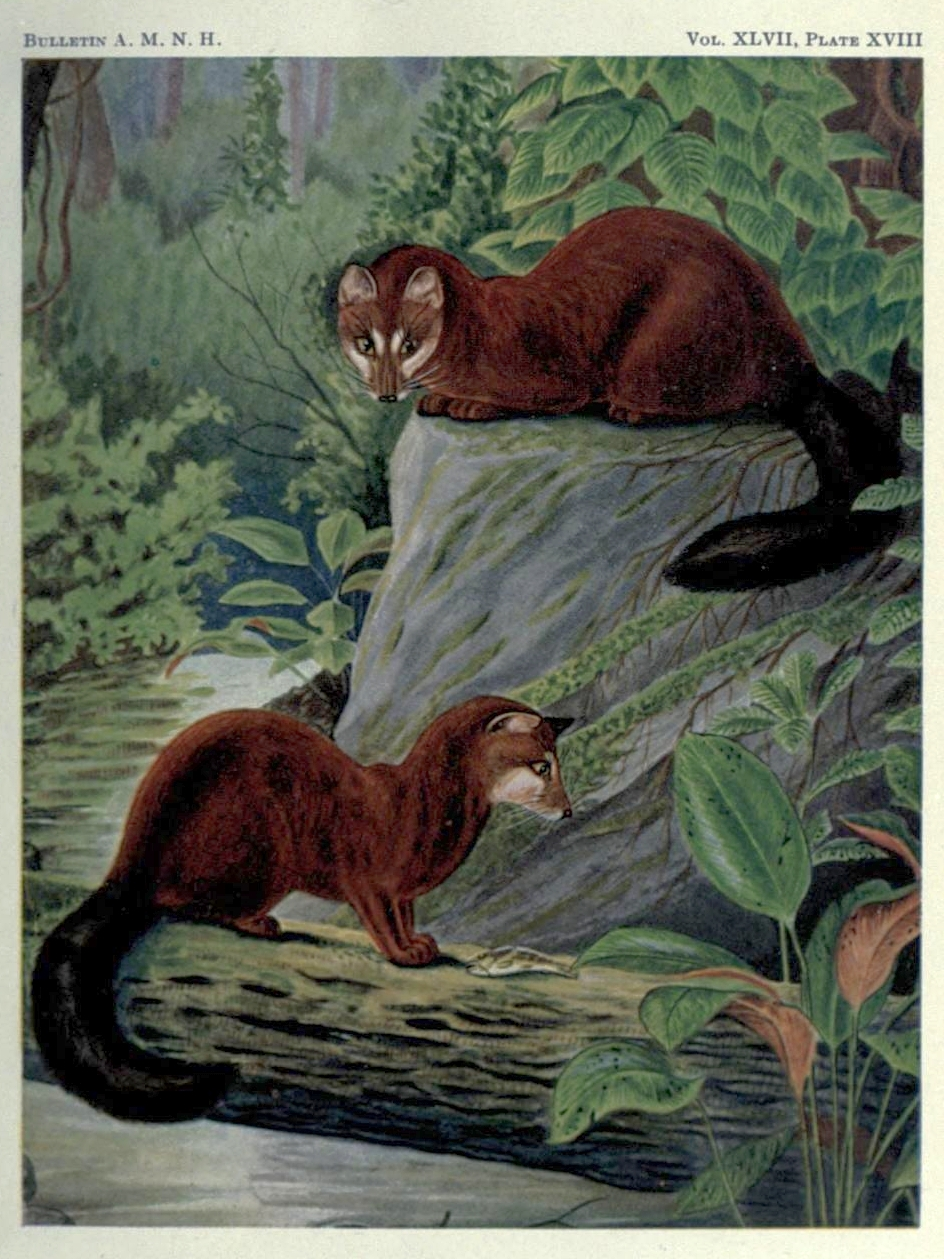

Conservation status
- Near Threatened (IUCN 3.1)

Scientific classification
- Kingdom: Animalia
- Phylum: Chordata
- Class: Mammalia
- Order: Carnivora
- Family: Viverridae
- Genus: Genetta
- Species: G. piscivora

Binomial name
- Genetta piscivora (Allen, 1919)
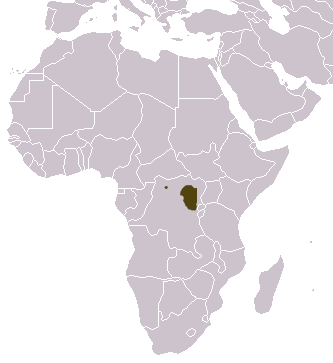
- Aquatic genet range

= Aquatic genet =

Species of carnivore

The aquatic genet (Genetta piscivora), also known as the fishing genet, is a genet that has only been recorded in the northeast of the Democratic Republic of the Congo. Since it is only known from about 30 specimens in natural history museums, it had been listed as Data Deficient on the IUCN Red List since 1996, as it is considered one of Africa's rarest carnivores. In 2015, it has been reassessed as Near Threatened.

When Joel Asaph Allen described the aquatic genet as a new genus and species in 1919, he named it Osbornictis piscivora. It was reassessed in 2004, and based on molecular evidence is now considered a Genetta species.

== Characteristics ==
The aquatic genet's long and dense fur is dark chestnut red without spots or bands. The head is pale fuscous brown with white spots on the sides of the muzzle, and above and below the eyes, which are framed with a narrow black ring. The ears are almost naked inside, edged with long whitish hairs and blackish outside. The bushy tail is black with pale brownish underfur. The soles of its feet are naked. These characteristics differ strikingly from those of other genet species. Its rhinarium and olfactory bulbs are smaller than in other genets, which may indicate a poorly developed sense of smell. Its trenchant teeth indicate an adaptation to piscivory.

Two adult males measured from 44.5 to 49.5 cm (17.5 to 19.5 in) in head and body length with a 34 to 41.5 cm (13.4 to 16.3 in) long tail. One male weighed 1.43 kg (3.2 lb), and a female 1.5 kg (3.3 lb).

== Distribution and habitat ==
Aquatic genets have only been recorded in rainforest east of the Congo River and in the Tshopo District at elevations from 460 to 1,500 m (1,510 to 4,920 ft). They have not been recorded with certainty from Uganda. Based on past records, their range is predicted to be limited to closed evergreen lowland and submontane forests in the Congo Basin.

== Ecology and behavior ==
Aquatic genets are thought to be solitary and crepuscular. They primarily feed on freshwater fish, including catfish, barbels, squeakers, carps, and also crustaceans. They possibly detect the movements of the fish with their whiskers, or attract the fish by patting the surface of the water with their whiskers.

A pregnant female was collected in December. To date, nothing else is known about their gestation, reproduction and development of offspring.

== Threats ==
It is unclear whether there are any major threats to aquatic genets. They are caught in snare traps set up by Pygmy people in the Ituri Forest.

== Conservation ==
In 1979, the aquatic genet has been given full protection by the Congolese government. It is assumed to be present in the Okapi Wildlife Reserve.
