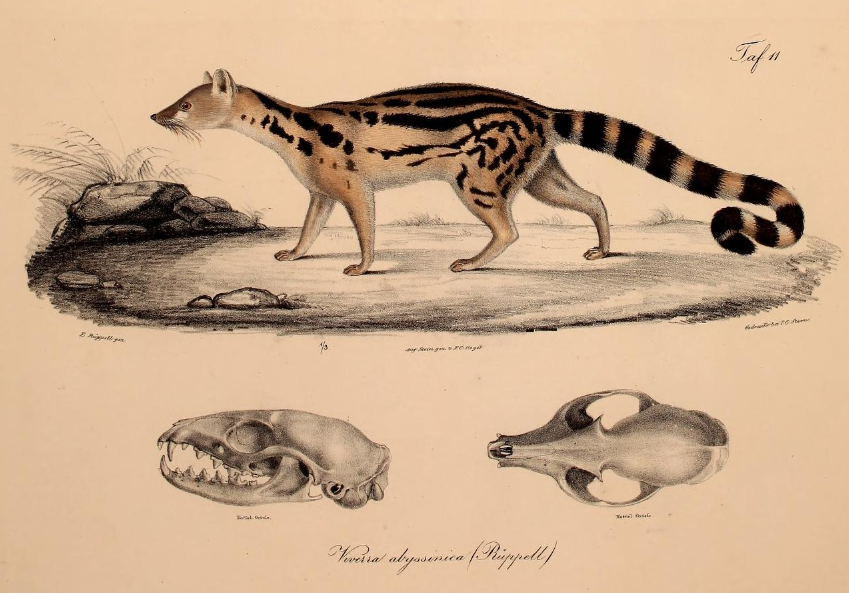

Conservation status
- Data Deficient (IUCN 3.1)

Scientific classification
- Kingdom: Animalia
- Phylum: Chordata
- Class: Mammalia
- Order: Carnivora
- Family: Viverridae
- Genus: Genetta
- Species: G. abyssinica

Binomial name
- Genetta abyssinica (Rüppell), 1835
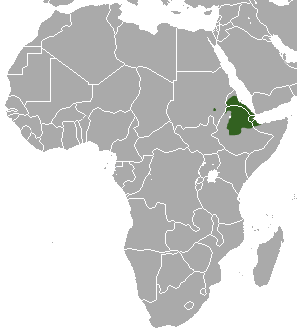
- Abyssinian genet range

= Abyssinian genet =

Species of carnivorans

The Abyssinian genet (Genetta abyssinica), also known as the Ethiopian genet, is a genet species native to Ethiopia, Eritrea, Somalia, Sudan, and Djibouti. It is listed as Data Deficient on the IUCN Red List. It is one of the least-known genet species.

== Characteristics ==
The Abyssinian genet has a shortened face, short legs and a moderately long tail, which is nearly as long as head and body. Its short, coarse fur is pale sandy in colour with five longitudinal black stripes on the back. The spots on the lower flanks are also distinctly elongated, resembling stripes rather than spots. The tail is marked by at least seven pale rings, separated by seven or eight narrow black rings and has a dark tip. It is also distinguished by the lack of hair between the metacarpal and digital pads of the forepaws. Its head-to-body length is 40 to 50 cm (16 to 20 in) with a 40 to 45 cm (16 to 18 in) long tail. The dental formula is 3.1.4.23.1.4.2

== Distribution and habitat ==
The Abyssinian genet inhabits coastal plains, Afromontane grasslands, and mountain moorlands. In Ethiopia, Abyssinian genets were observed up to 3,750 m (12,300 ft) in the Abune Yosef massif.

== Threats ==
The population is likely being reduced due to habitat fragmentation, as many areas with historical records have been turned into croplands. Prior to the Second World War the skins of Abyssinian genets were recorded for sale in markets in Addis Ababa market, it is unknown whether there is still a market for the skins of this species. In general this species is too poorly known to properly assess its conservation status.
