= King genet =

Conservation status
- Data Deficient (IUCN 3.1)

Scientific classification
- Kingdom: Animalia
- Phylum: Chordata
- Class: Mammalia
- Order: Carnivora
- Family: Viverridae
- Genus: Genetta
- Species: G. poensis

Binomial name
- Genetta poensis Waterhouse, 1838
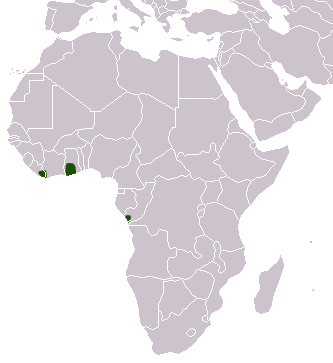
- King genet range

Species of carnivore

The king genet (Genetta poensis) is a genet species native to Republic of the Congo, Equatorial Guinea, Liberia, Ghana and Côte d'Ivoire. The species was first described in 1838. As it has not been recorded since 1946, it is listed as Data Deficient on the IUCN Red List.

== Taxonomy ==
The king genet was first described and classified as a separate species by George Robert Waterhouse in 1838 on the basis of a single skin from Bioko in Equatorial Guinea.

== Description ==
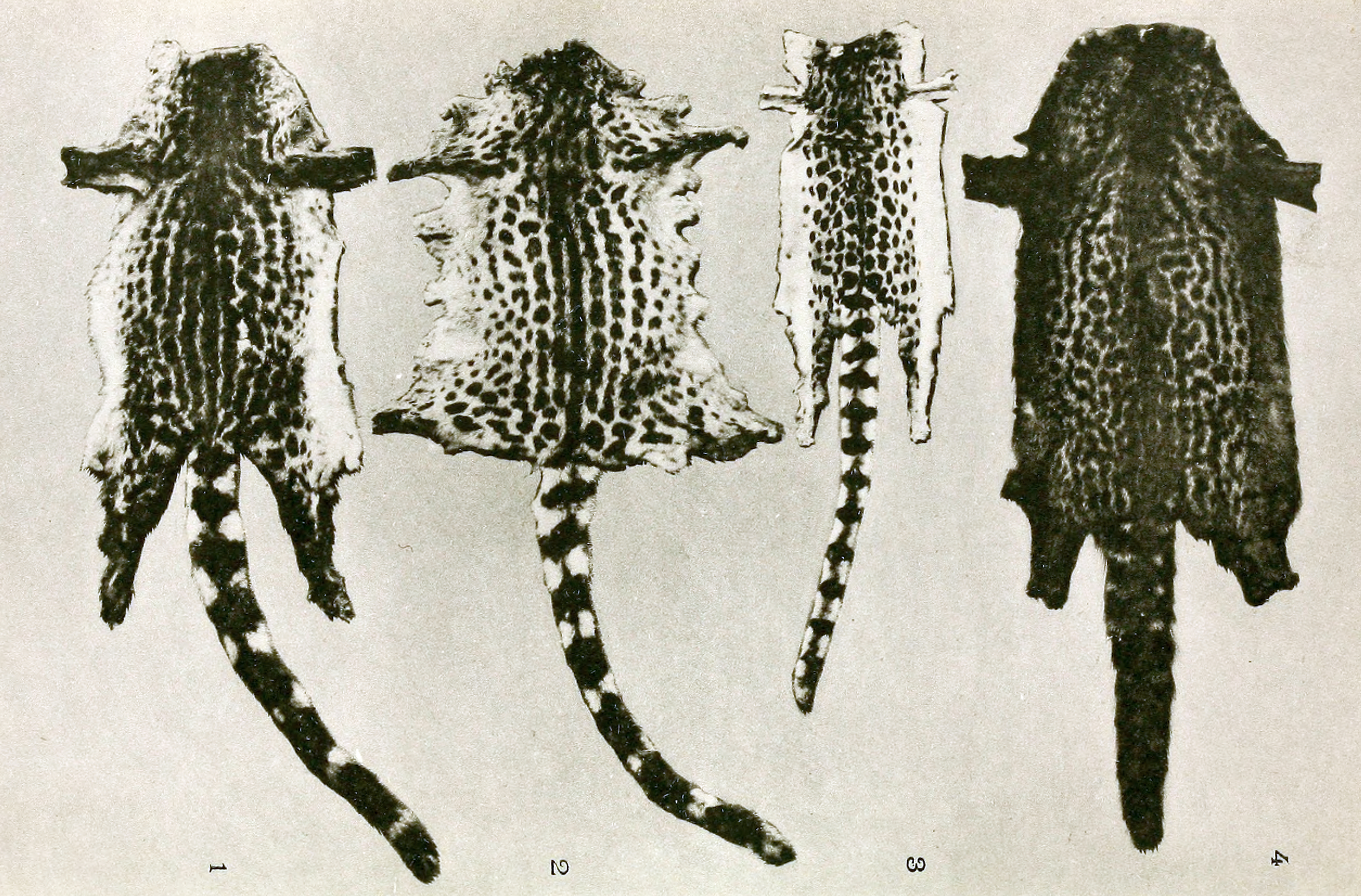
A king genet pelt (first at the right)

King genet has a pale yellowish to grey fur covered with dark spots. The spots are more squarer and elongated on the dorsal side of the body. It has a large skull, with broad ears, and a snout, which has distinguishable dark lines covered with white spots. The limbs are darker with spots, and the underside are black. It has a short and stout tail with thick fur. The hind part of the tail is dark, and tail has four to six annular rings. The skin colorization provides a camouflage and adapted for thick forest environment.

== Distribution and habitat ==
The king genet occurs in pockets of north west coast of Africa, and West Africa cross the countries of Equatorial Guinea, Liberia, Ghana, Ivory Coast, and Republic of Congo. As it has not been recorded since 1946, it is listed as Data Deficient on the IUCN Red List.
