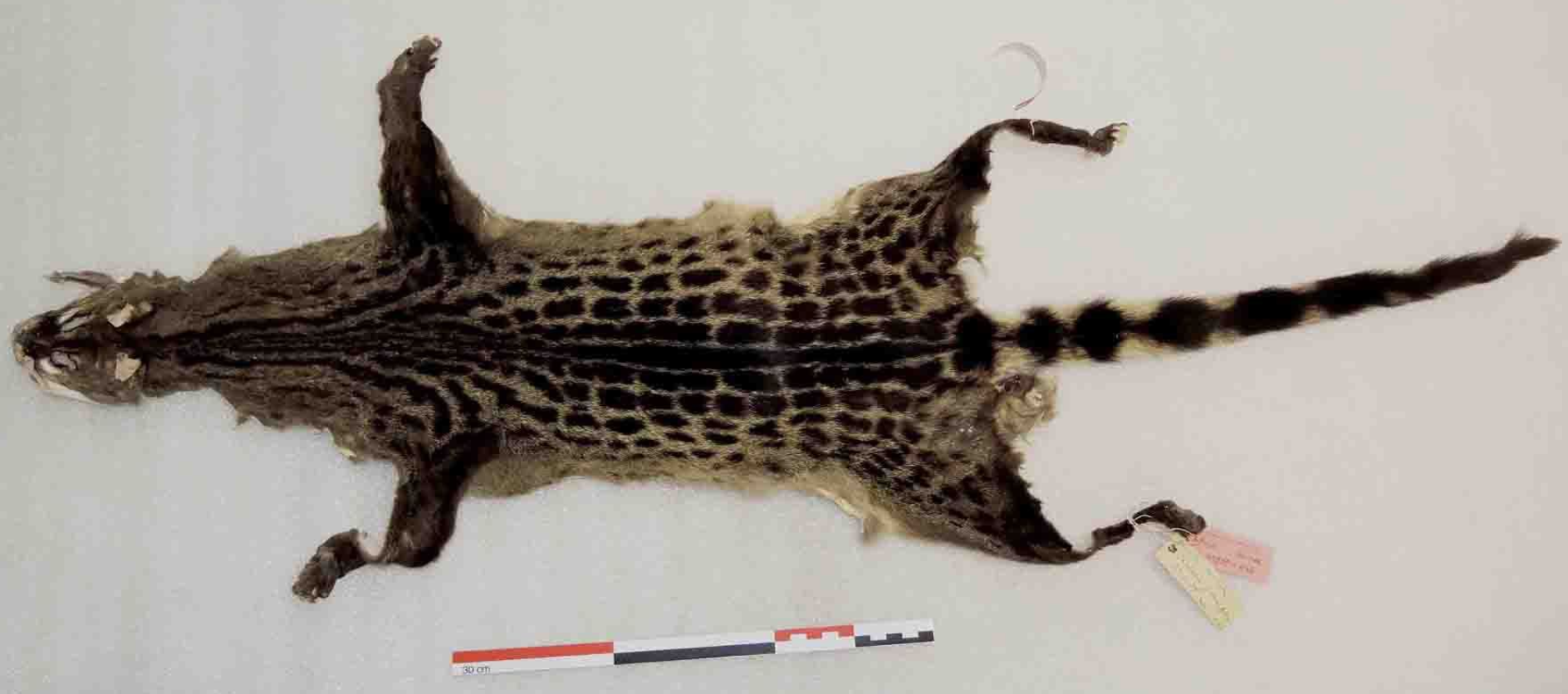

Conservation status
- Vulnerable (IUCN 3.1)

Scientific classification
- Kingdom: Animalia
- Phylum: Chordata
- Class: Mammalia
- Order: Carnivora
- Family: Viverridae
- Genus: Genetta
- Species: G. bourloni

Binomial name
- Genetta bourloni Gaubert, 2003
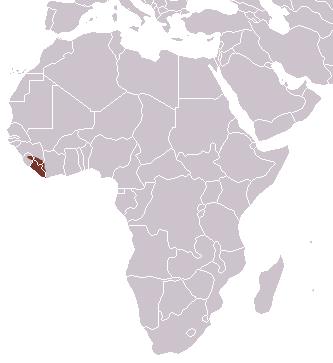
- Bourlon's genet range

= Bourlon's genet =

Species of carnivoran

Bourlon's genet (Genetta bourloni) is a genet species native to the Upper Guinean forests in West Africa. It was classified as a separate species in 2003. It is listed as Vulnerable on the IUCN Red List.

== Taxonomy ==
Bourlon's genet was described as a distinct species by Philippe Gaubert in 2003; the type specimen was a skin and scull of an adult genet collected in 1958 in Sérédou, Cercle de Macenta in Guinea, which is part of the collection at the National Museum of Natural History, France. It is named in honour of Philippe Bourlon, a zoo keeper at the Paris Zoological Park.

== Description ==
Bourlon's genet has cream coloured fur with brown markings and dark spots. Its fur is thick and short. The spots vary in size and shape across the body, with the hind limbs generally free of any spots. There are white coloured markings around the snout, with distinct black lines across the face. It has a large tail covered with a thick fur, and is marked by five to seven annular black rings. Both the sexes are similar in size.

== Distribution and habitat ==
The Bourlon's genet is restricted to the Upper Guinean forests of Guinea, Sierra Leone, Liberia and the Ivory Coast. It was recorded for the first time during a camera trap survey in the Putu Mountains of southeastern Liberia between December 2010 and May 2011.

== Threats and conservation ==
Habitat loss and hunting are considered to be a major threats to the Bourlon's genet; it is listed as Vulnerable on the IUCN Red List as the population has been estimated to consist of fewer than 10,000 individuals.
