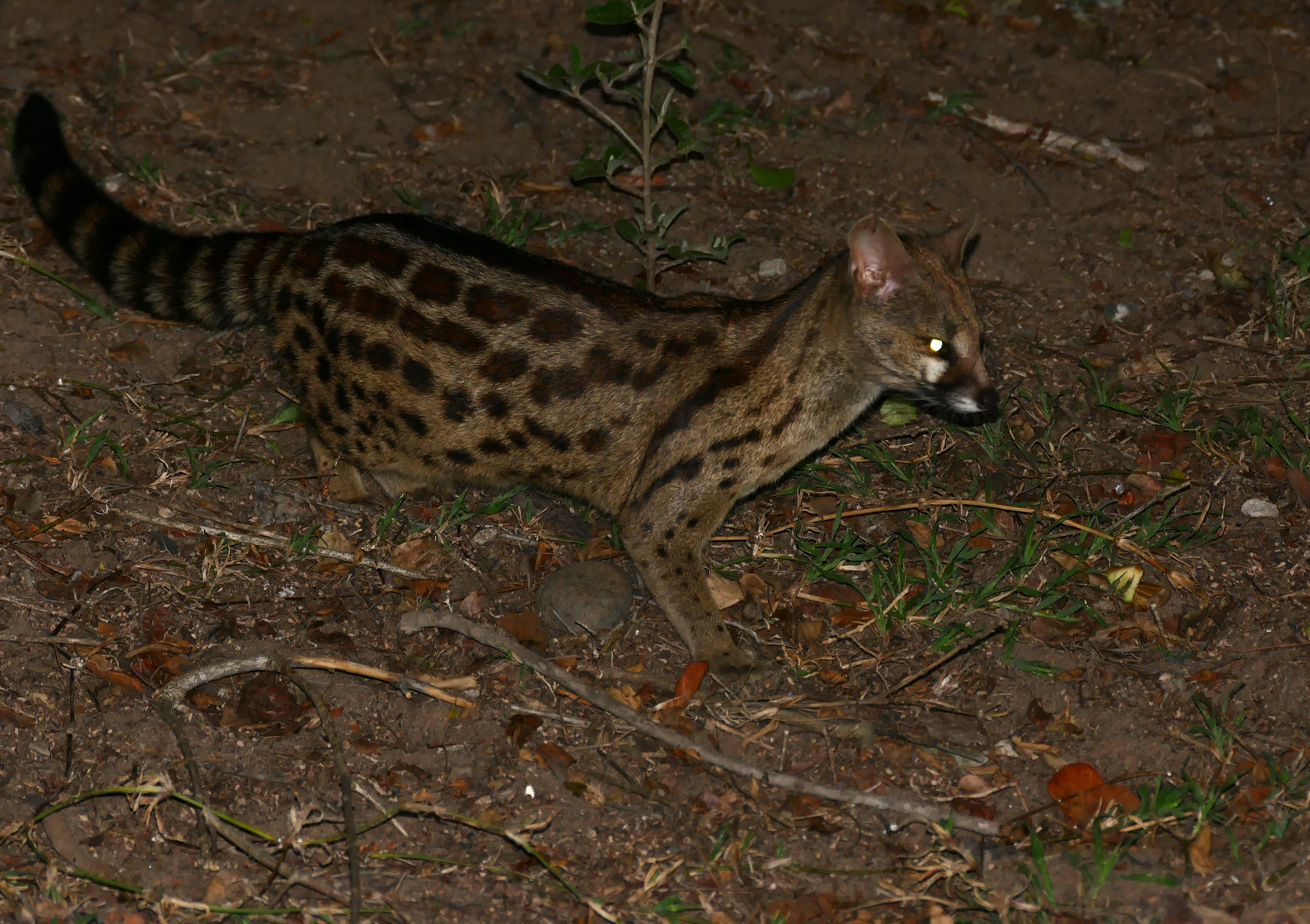

Conservation status
- Least Concern (IUCN 3.1)

Scientific classification
- Kingdom: Animalia
- Phylum: Chordata
- Class: Mammalia
- Infraclass: Placentalia
- Order: Carnivora
- Family: Viverridae
- Genus: Genetta
- Species: G. maculata

Binomial name
- Genetta maculata (Gray, 1830)
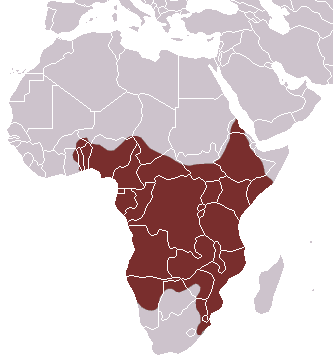
- Rusty-spotted genet range

= Rusty-spotted genet =

Species of carnivore

The rusty-spotted genet (Genetta maculata), also called panther genet and large-spotted genet, is a genet that is widely distributed in sub-Saharan Africa. It is considered common and therefore listed as Least Concern on the IUCN Red List.

== Characteristics ==
The rusty-spotted genet has short whitish grey to pale yellow coloured fur with dark spots and a continuous dark line across the back. The spots of the upper two dorsal rows are round or square, brown in the center and darker outside. In head-to-body length it ranges from 42 to 52 cm (17 to 20 in). Its 40 to 53 cm (16 to 21 in) long tail is ringed and has a dark tip. Its feet are of the same colour as the fur. It weighs from 1.3 to 3 kg (2.9 to 6.6 lb).

== Behaviour and ecology ==
Research in southeastern Nigeria revealed that the rusty-spotted genet has an omnivorous diet. It feeds on rodents like giant pouched rats (Cricetomys), Nigerian shrew (Crocidura nigeriae), Temminck's mouse (Mus musculoides), Tullberg's soft-furred mouse (Praomys tulbergi), Peters's striped mouse (Hybomys univittatus), typical striped grass mouse (Lemniscomys striatus), red-eyed dove (Streptopelia semitorquata), common agama (Agama agama), Mabuya skinks, Myriapoda, spiders, Orthoptera and Coleoptera as well as eggs, fruits, berries and seeds.

== Taxonomy ==
In 1830, John Edward Gray first described a rusty-spotted genet using the name Viverra maculata based on a zoological specimen that lived in the menagerie at the Tower of London. In the 19th and 20th centuries, several taxonomists proposed the following species and subspecies for specimens obtained by natural history museums:

- fieldiana Du Chaillu, 1860
- aequatorialis Heuglin, 1866
- erlangeri, gleimi, schraderi, stuhlmanni, suahelica, zambesiana Matschie, 1902
- matschiei Neumann, 1902
- pumila Hollister, 1916
- insularis Cabrera, 1921
- rubiginosa zuluensis Roberts, 1924
- soror Schwarz, 1929
- rubiginosa albiventris Roberts, 1932
- deorum Funaioli and Simonetta, 1960
- pardina schoutedeni Crawford-Cabral, 1970

Genetta letabae (Thomas and Schwann, 1906), formerly considered a subspecies, is now thought to be a separate species.
