= Letaba genet =

Scientific classification
- Kingdom: Animalia
- Phylum: Chordata
- Class: Mammalia
- Order: Carnivora
- Family: Viverridae
- Genus: Genetta
- Species: G. letabae

Binomial name
- Genetta letabae Thomas and Schwann, 1906

Synonyms
- G. zuluensis Roberts, 1924

Species of carnivore

The Letaba genet (Genetta letabae) is a genet native to Lesotho, Mozambique, Namibia, South Africa and Eswatini. It is the only species of genet that occurs in Lesotho and Eswatini. It was first described in 1906 by Oldfield Thomas and Harold Swann based on a specimen from South Africa. It was formerly classified as a subspecies of the rusty-spotted genet and was recognised as a distinct species in 2005.

== Taxonomy ==
The Letaba genet was first described in 1906 by Oldfield Thomas and Harold Schwann on the basis of a zoological specimen collected in Knysna, South Africa. It was initially classified as a subspecies of the rusty-spotted genet (Genetta maculata), but was re-classified in 2005 as a distinct species under the name Genetta letabae.

== Distribution and habitat ==
Letaba genet is a genet native to Lesotho, Mozambique, Namibia, South Africa and Eswatini. It is the only species of genet that occurs in Lesotho and Eswatini. It inhabits woodlands, forests, and grasslands across the range.

== Description ==
Letaba genet has ground colored fur across the body with spots. The fur gets darker on the posterior regions, with the reduction in the number of spots. The body is 1.1 to 1.4 times longer than the tail. The tail consists of shorter tail hair, six to nine circular rings, and ends in a dark tip. The skull size is similar to rusty-spotted genet, while the Letaba genet has wider space between the eyes. The feet are darker, with depressions in the feet. The females have two pairs of teats
