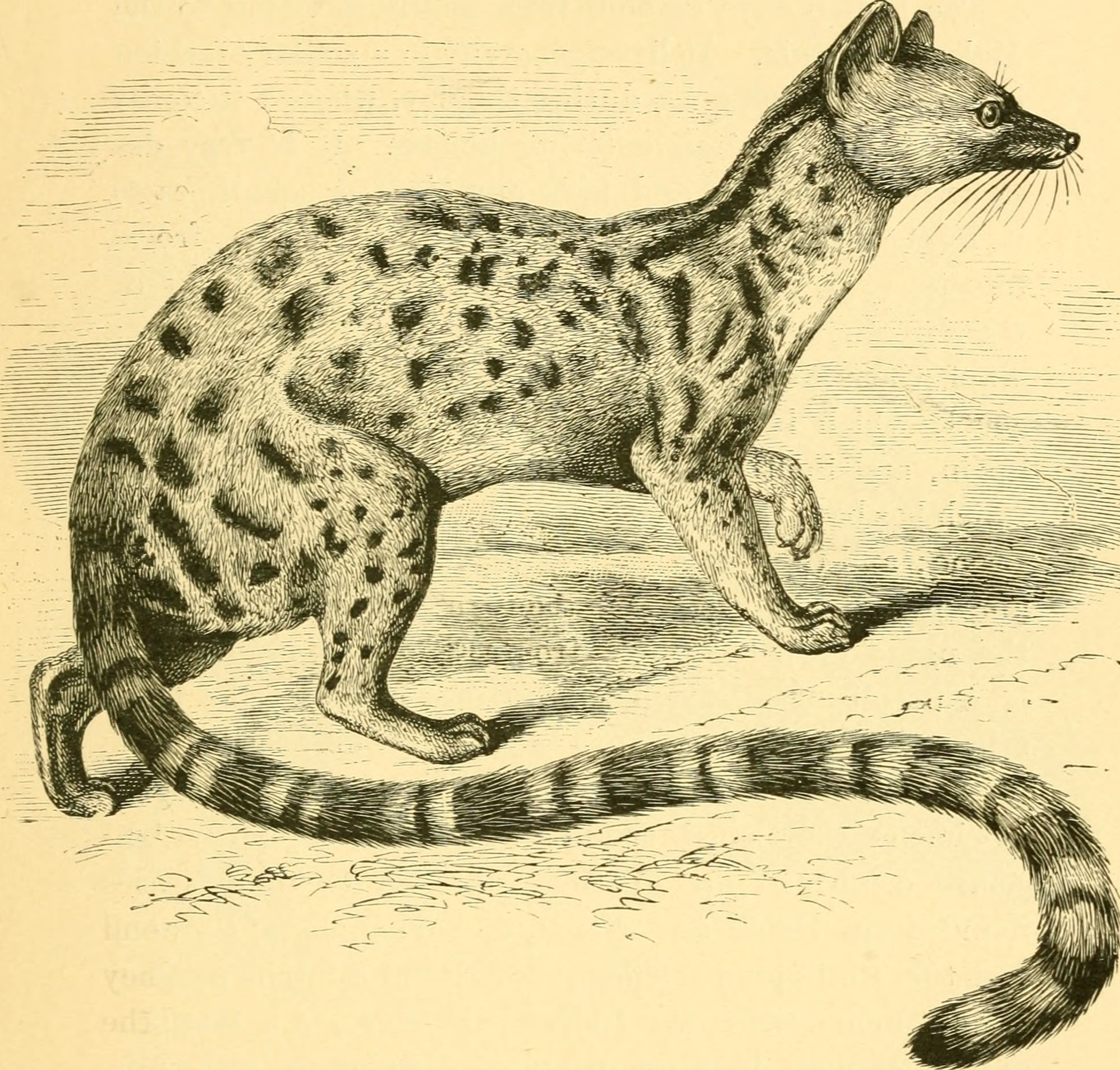

Conservation status
- Vulnerable (IUCN 3.1)

Scientific classification
- Kingdom: Animalia
- Phylum: Chordata
- Class: Mammalia
- Order: Carnivora
- Family: Viverridae
- Genus: Poiana
- Species: P. leightoni

Binomial name
- Poiana leightoni Pocock, 1908
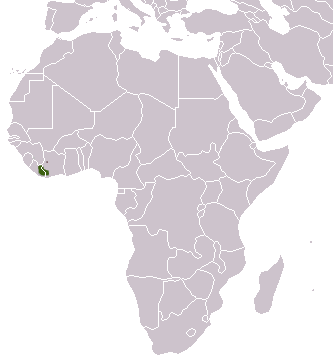
- Distribution of Leighton's linsang

Synonyms
- Poiana richardsoni leightoni (protonym); Poiana richardsoni liberiensis (erratum)

= West African oyan =

Species of carnivore

The West African oyan (Poiana leightoni), also known as the West African linsang, is a linsang species native to the Upper Guinean forests in West Africa. It is one of the least known small carnivores in Africa.

== Characteristics ==
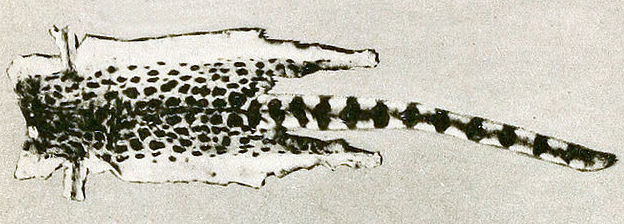

The West African oyan's body is slender and long, with an elongated head and a pointed muzzle. Its fur is yellowish to reddish brown with dark oval shaped spots on the neck, and small spots on the back and legs. Its throat, chest and belly are lighter in colour and without spots. Its tail has 10 to 12 dark rings. Its body is 30–38 cm (12–15 in) long, with a 35–40 cm (14–16 in) long tail.

== Distribution and habitat ==
The West African oyan inhabits the canopy of tropical forests in West Africa. Two known records in the Ivory Coast date to the 1960s and 1970s. In Liberia, it was recorded in ten localities between the 1960s and late 1980s. Its presence in Sierra Leone and Guinea is uncertain.

== Threats ==
The West African oyan is probably affected by habitat loss due to logging of tropical forests, and by hunting for bushmeat.

== Taxonomy ==
The West African oyan was first described—in a paper read at the 26 November 1907 meeting of the Zoological Society of London and published the following May—by Reginald Innes Pocock, based on a zoological specimen collected in Liberia. Pocock considered it a subspecies of the Central African oyan, the trinomial in the original orthography being Poiana richardsoni leightoni, Poiana richardsoni liberiensis being printed in error. In 1974, Donovan Reginald Rosevear elevated "Leighton's linsang" from subspecies to independent species rank.
