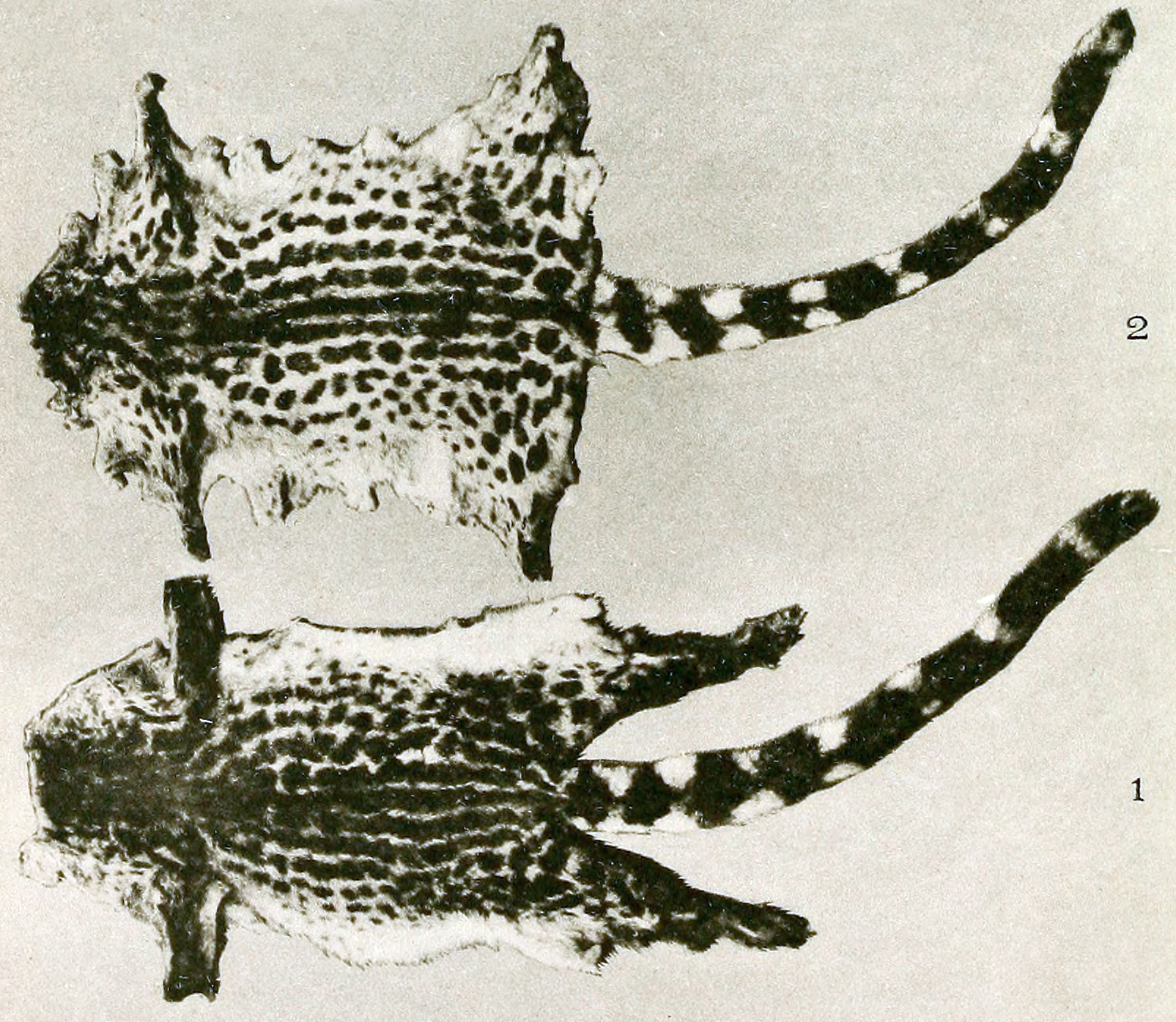

Conservation status
- Near Threatened (IUCN 3.1)

Scientific classification
- Kingdom: Animalia
- Phylum: Chordata
- Class: Mammalia
- Order: Carnivora
- Family: Viverridae
- Genus: Genetta
- Species: G. johnstoni

Binomial name
- Genetta johnstoni (Pocock, 1908)
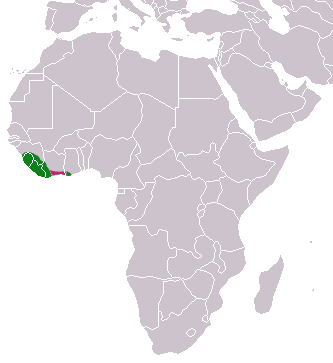
- Johnston's genet range (green - extant, pink - probably extant)

Synonyms
- lehmanni Kuhn, 1960

= Johnston's genet =

Species of carnivore

Johnston's genet (Genetta johnstoni) is a genet species native to the Upper Guinean forests in West Africa. It was classified as a separate species by Reginald Innes Pocock in 1908. It is listed as Near Threatened on the IUCN Red List.

== Taxonomy ==
Johnston's genet was first scientifically described and classified as a distinct species by Reginald Innes Pocock in 1907.

== Description ==
Johnston's genet has a short fur which is rich golden to ochre yellowish in color. It has small reddish spots on the sides, and a dark stripe along the spine. The limbs are darker in color with its hind legs predominantly grey. It has a large tail with eight black and seven pale rings, and a brown tip that is whitish below. The skin colorization provides a camouflage in its regular environment within the forests. Its incisors and mandibles are designed and adapted for an insectivorous diet.

== Distribution and habitat ==
Johnston's genet is found in the Upper Guinean forests along the north west coast of Africa, across the countries of Guinea, Sierra Leone, Liberia, Ghana and the Ivory Coast. In January 2000, a dead individual was recovered in Taï National Park in Ivory Coast, and the first live individual was captured in July 2000. In 2011, it was recorded in the wild for the first time in Dindefelo Nature Reserve, a protected area in southeastern Senegal.

== Behaviour and ecology ==
Johnston's genet is predominantly nocturnal, feeding at night, and returning to its perch in the early morning. It spends the day sleeping and resting on tree tops. Its diet largely consists of insects, and small animals. It is vulnerable to being hunted by land based predators such as cheetahs, and leopards, and large birds such as eagles. It is also affected by various parasites such as ticks. It gives birth during the wet season, when prey is in abundance, and generally has a maximum litter size of two individuals.

== Threats ==
Johnston's genet is threatened by habitat loss due to agriculture and logging, and hunting for its meat and fur; it is listed as Near Threatened on the IUCN Red List. There are no estimates available of the total population.
