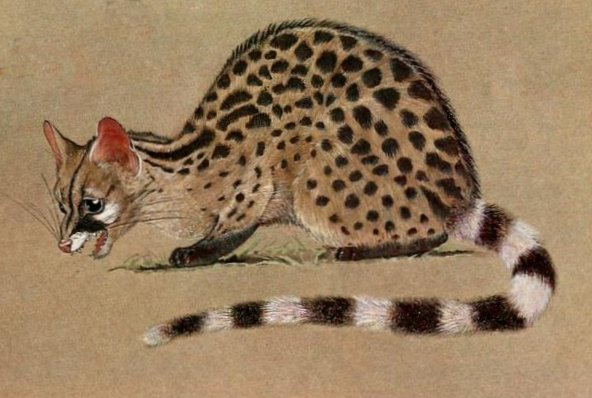
- Illustration of a crested servaline genet

Conservation status
- Vulnerable (IUCN 3.1)

Scientific classification
- Kingdom: Animalia
- Phylum: Chordata
- Class: Mammalia
- Order: Carnivora
- Family: Viverridae
- Genus: Genetta
- Species: G. cristata

Binomial name
- Genetta cristata Hayman, 1940
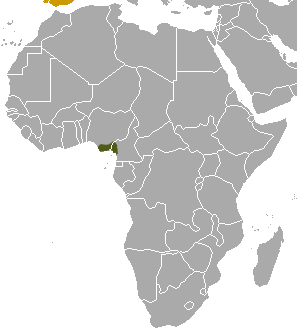
- Crested servaline genet range

Synonyms
- Genetta bini Rosevear, 1974

= Crested servaline genet =

Species of carnivore

The crested servaline genet (Genetta cristata), also known as the crested genet, is a genet species endemic to Nigeria and Cameroon. As the population has declined due to loss of habitat, it is listed as Vulnerable on the IUCN Red List. It was first recorded in the Mamfe Division in Cameroon and initially considered a subspecies of the servaline genet (Genetta servalina). But now it is regarded as a distinct species.

== Characteristics ==
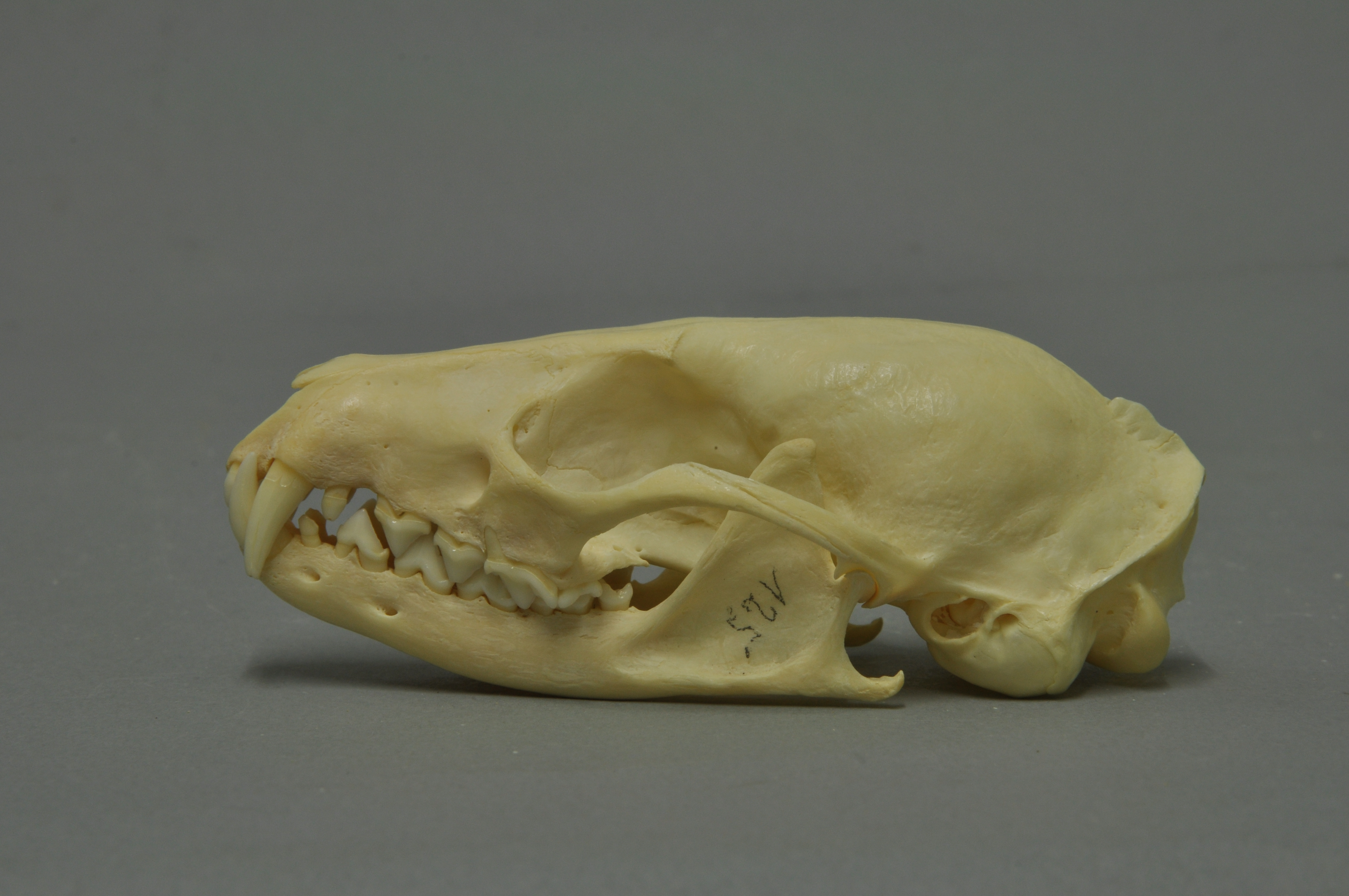
Genetta cristata skull

The crested servaline genet is a rather small and slender genet with relatively long legs and a narrow face. Its khaki colored fur is short, soft and dense with dark spots that are densely and evenly distributed. Its long tail is banded with wide black bands and thin whitish bands. Its crest on the back of the neck does not extend onto the back.

Its feet are dark. It has a dark discontinuous mid-dorsal line with relatively long hairs that form a nuchal crest.

== Distribution and habitat ==
The crested servaline genet occurs in southern Nigeria from the Niger Delta east into Cameroon to the Sanaga River. It inhabits scrub, low tangled vegetation and bare ground below trees in tall deciduous forest. Occasionally it has also been recorded in secondary and montane forest.

In Nigeria it is associated with primary dry forest, bush–mango plantations inside the forest, and to a lesser extent to secondary dry forest and primary flooded forest. It avoids suburban areas, pineapple plantations, bushlands and oil-palm plantations. It is restricted to lower elevations from sea level to about 1,000 m (3,300 ft) elevation. Its presence has been predicted in Gabon and Republic of Congo, but not been confirmed.

== Threats ==
The crested servaline genet is threatened by loss of habitat. The major areas of its occurrence in the Cross River State Forests is being converted into agriculturally used land; oil is produced in the Niger Delta. It may also be subject to pressure from intensive hunting.
