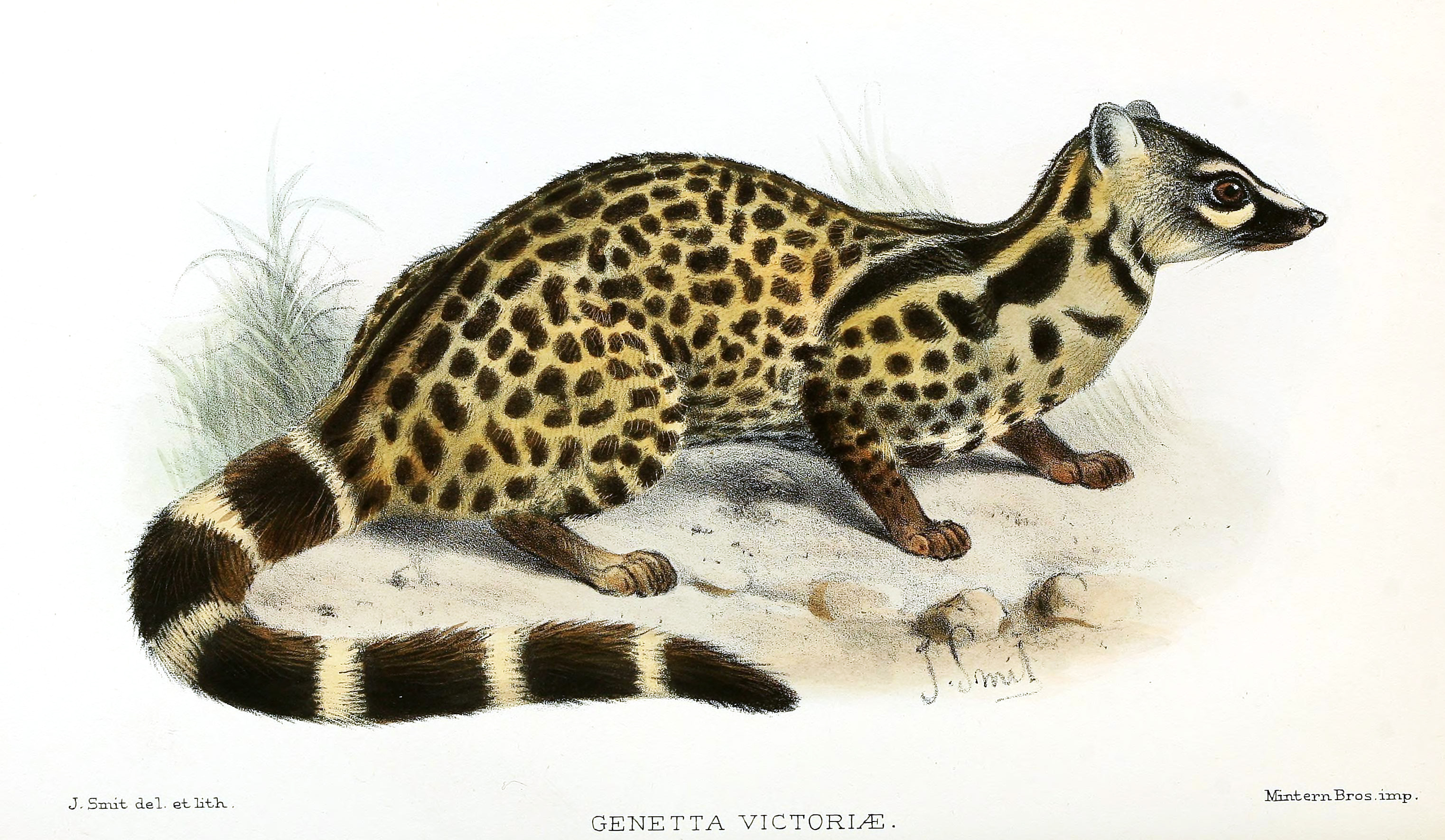

Conservation status
- Least Concern (IUCN 3.1)

Scientific classification
- Kingdom: Animalia
- Phylum: Chordata
- Class: Mammalia
- Order: Carnivora
- Family: Viverridae
- Genus: Genetta
- Species: G. victoriae

Binomial name
- Genetta victoriae Thomas, 1901
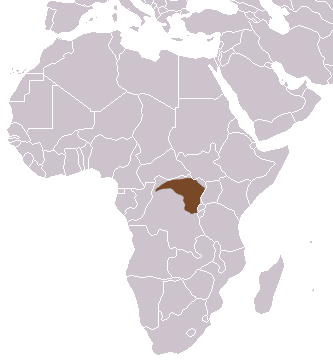
- Giant forest genet range

= Giant forest genet =

Species of carnivoran

The giant forest genet (Genetta victoriae), also known as the giant genet, is a genet species endemic to the Congo Basin. As it is considered as widely distributed and common, it is listed as Least Concern on the IUCN Red List.

== Characteristics ==
The giant genet has a yellowish white short and thick fur with numerous black spots. It is whitish on top of the muzzle and between the eyes. .

Measurements of museum specimen range from 55 to 60 cm (22 to 24 in) in head and body with a 413 to 490 mm (16.3 to 19.3 in) long tail.
