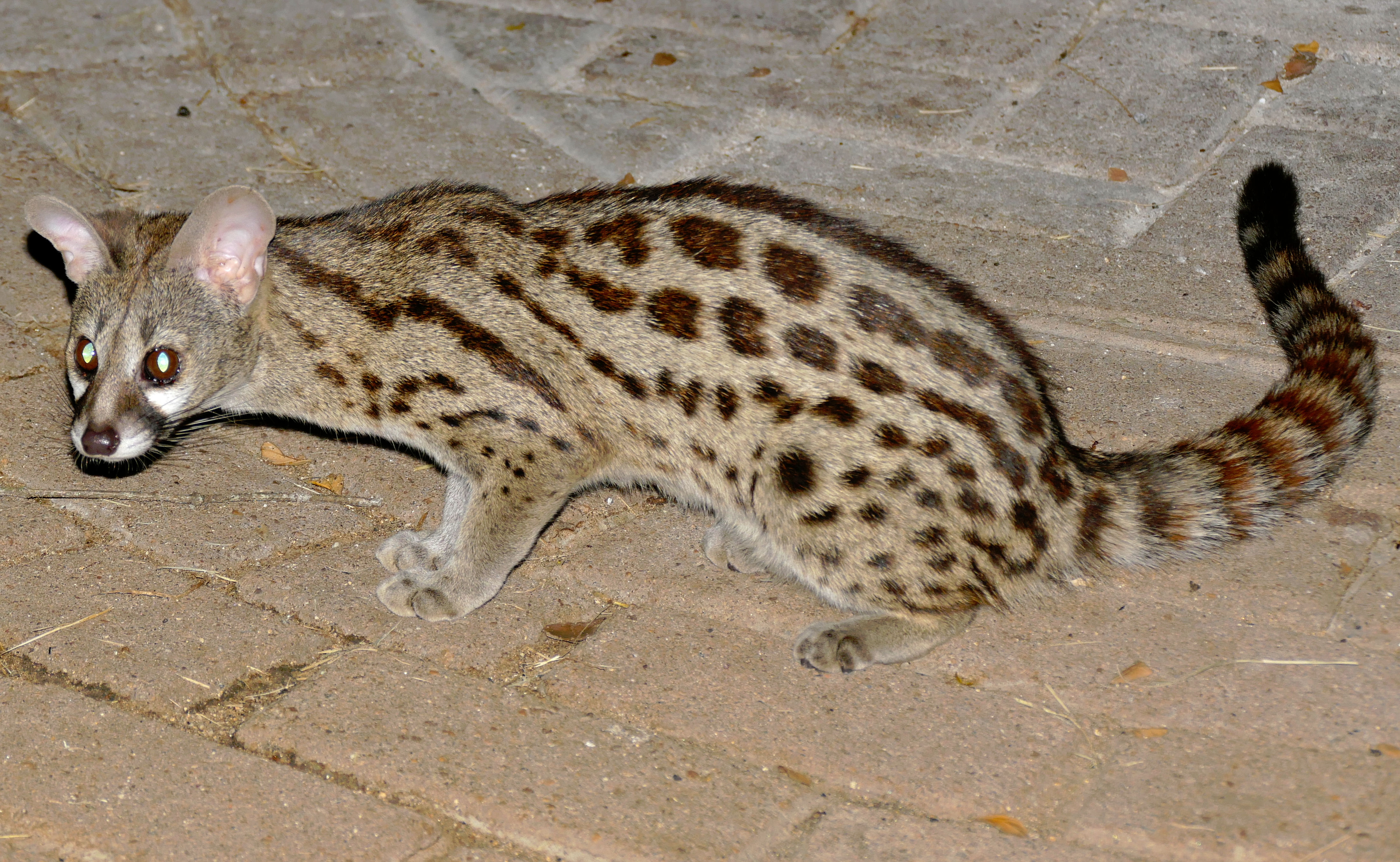

Conservation status
- Least Concern (IUCN 3.1)

Scientific classification
- Kingdom: Animalia
- Phylum: Chordata
- Class: Mammalia
- Infraclass: Placentalia
- Order: Carnivora
- Family: Viverridae
- Genus: Genetta
- Species: G. tigrina

Binomial name
- Genetta tigrina (Schreber, 1778)
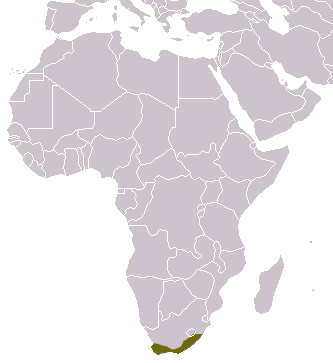
- Distribution of the Cape genet

= Cape genet =

Species of carnivorans

The Cape genet (Genetta tigrina), also known as the South African large-spotted genet, is a genet species endemic to South Africa. As it is common and not threatened, it is listed as Least Concern on the IUCN Red List. Like other genets, it is nocturnal and arboreal, preferring to live in the riparian zones of forests, as long as these are not marshy areas.

== Characteristics ==
The Cape genet is ash grey with brown irregular spots and a black stripe along the spine. Its muzzle is white, and it has white spots below the eye. Its ears are grey. Its tail is black and white banded with a black tip. Some individuals living in areas with more than 375 mm (14.8 in) annual precipitation are darker than individuals from drier areas.

Measurements of adult males range from 460 to 580 mm (18 to 23 in) in head and body with a 390 to 459 mm (15.4 to 18.1 in) long tail and a weight of 1.6 to 2.1 kg (3.5 to 4.6 lb). Adult females range from 427 to 560 mm (16.8 to 22.0 in) in head and body with a 385 to 432 mm (15.2 to 17.0 in) long tail and a weight of 1.36 to 1.870 kg (3.00 to 4.12 lb).

Like in all Viverrinae, its dental formula is: 3.1.4.23.1.4.2. Like all genets, it has musk glands and anal sacs.

It differs from other genets by a short dorsal crest and poorly spotted hind legs, which are dark at the back.

== Distribution and habitat ==
In South Africa, the Cape genet is distributed from the Western Cape to KwaZulu-Natal, south of 32°S, and to the Lesotho border. It is the most widely distributed and common small carnivore in KwaZulu-Natal, and rests in large trees, rock overhangs and caves. It lives in moist environments near streams, rivers and standing water, in lowland and mountain fynbos, where vegetation cover is high.

== Ecology and behaviour ==
Cape genets have been recorded solitary, and mostly at night. During the day, they rest in trees high above the ground. They are both terrestrial and arboreal, but hunt and feed on the ground. They mark by depositing a secretion from the anal sac. It is unknown whether they are territorial. They use latrine sites to defecate.

Cape genets become active after dark to search for prey. Combining speed and stealth, they dash forward in an elusive fashion, broken up by short pauses. They hiss and growl in stressful situations. Olfactory communication is most likely very important in the life of Cape genets, their social environment and life cycle. When walking on branches, they stay low and laterally swing their legs out so that any misstep is easily correctable.

=== Feeding ecology ===
Cape genets feed mostly on rodents such as African vlei rats, rock rats, mice and birds. Also seeds, leaves and grass was found in their stomachs, as well as beetles, grasshoppers, crickets, locusts and termites. They find most of their prey in low bushes and leaf litter, including African climbing mice, multimammate mice and African dormice. They are considered to be opportunistic omnivores, since they also catch and feed on insects, spiders, scorpions, and scavenge fish on the beach. Eating grass may aid digestion, dislodge hair in the intestines, induce vomiting to get rid of ingested toxins, relieve throat inflammation and stomach irritation. Birds appear to not be prevalent in their diet.

=== Reproduction ===
Cape genets apparently mate during the warm summer months. Pregnant females were observed in September to November. Two young weighed 70 g at birth.

A captive breeding pair regularly had litters of two young. Gestation periods last about 70 days. Females make nests in hollow trees, in holes or among boulders. The young open their eyes 10 days after birth, their canine teeth break through at the age of four weeks. They are weaned at about 2.5 months and hunt on their own when about seven months old.

Captive Cape genets lived for 15 years.

== Threats ==
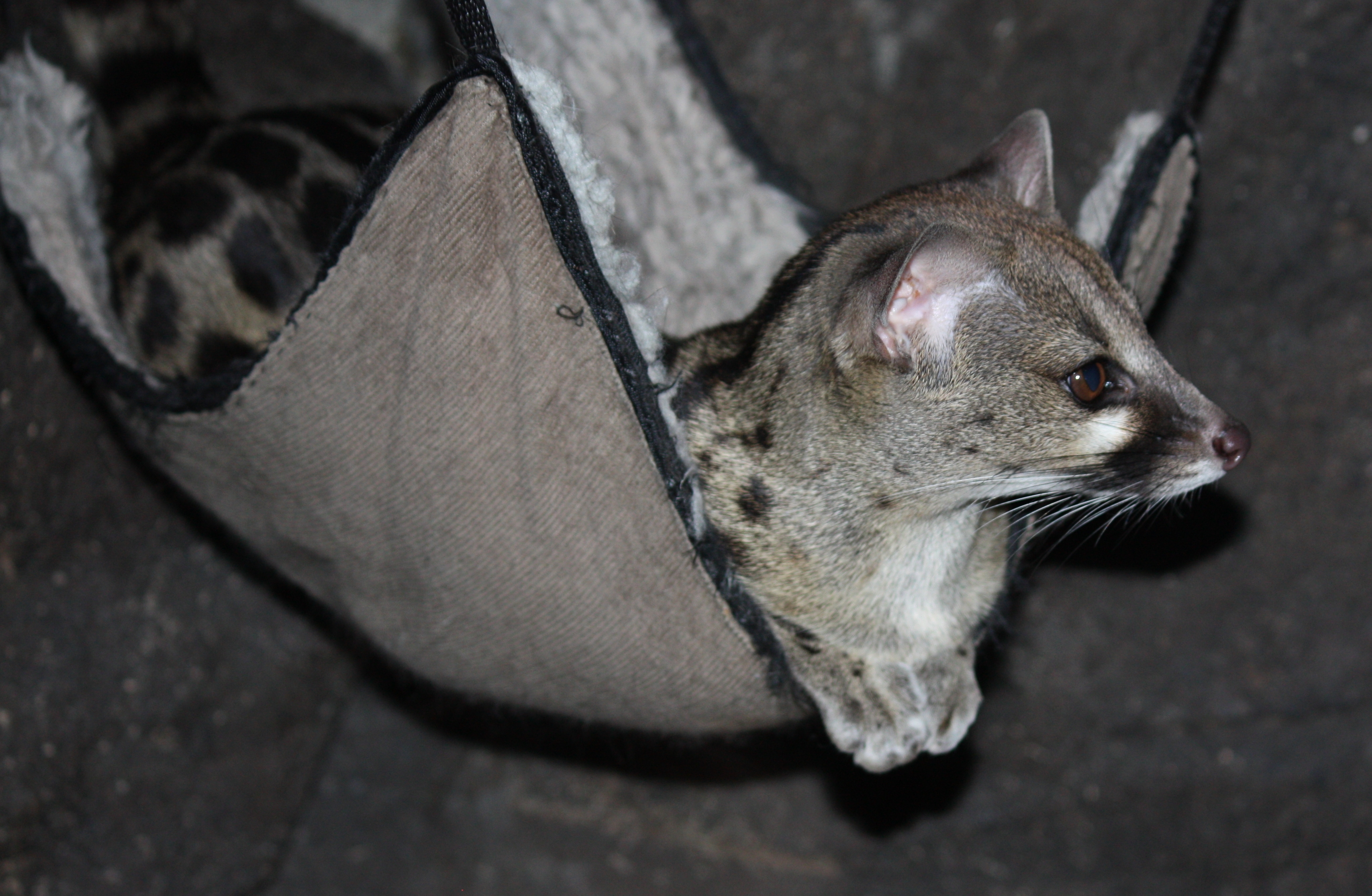
Cape genet in captivity

Cape genets face no major threats. As they sometimes kill poultry, they are killed in retaliation by farmers.

== Conservation ==
Cape genets have been recorded in dozens of protected areas. Outside reserves they are unprotected, and not listed in the South African Red Data Book nor any CITES appendices.

== As a pet ==
The Cape genet is one of the mammalian species kept as an exotic pet.
