= Paul Matschie =

German zoologist (1861–1926)

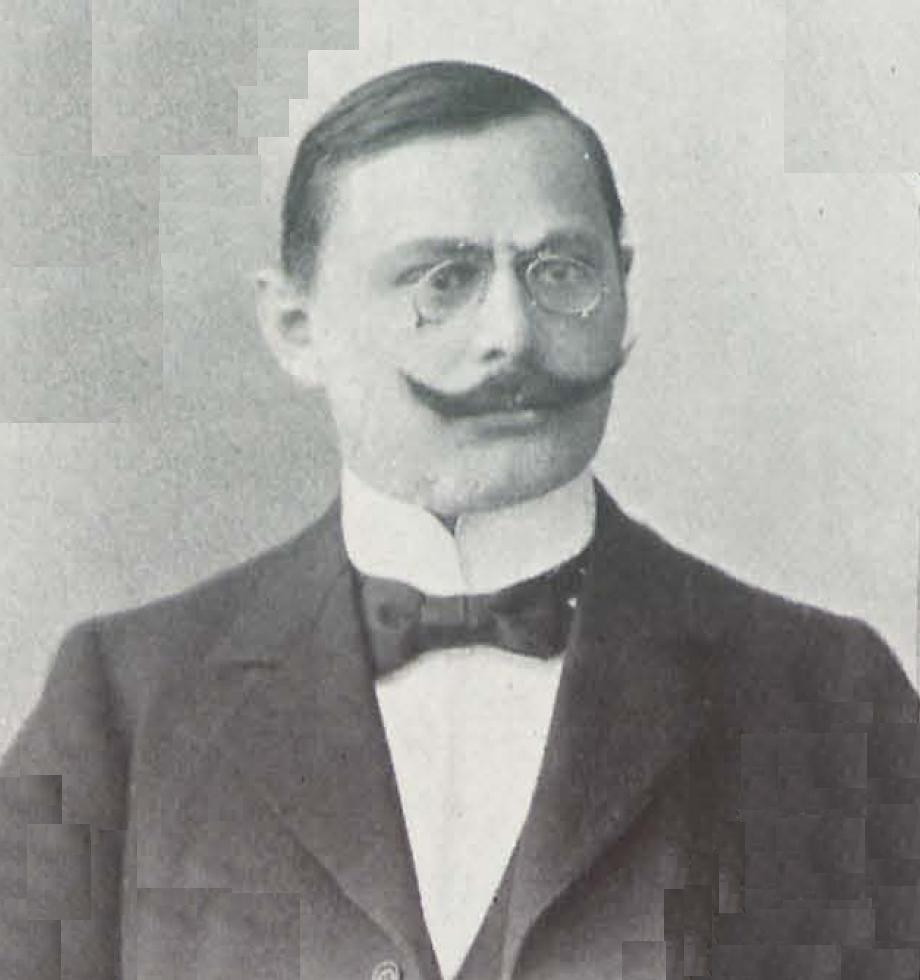
- Born: 11 August 1861; Brandenburg an der Havel, Brandenburg, Germany
- Died: 7 March 1926 (aged 64); Friedenau, Berlin
- Education: University of Halle, University of Berlin
- Known for: Describing 11 new species of reptiles
- Scientific career
- Fields: Zoology
- Institutions: Berlin Zoological Museum
- Author abbrev. (zoology): Matschie

Paul Matschie (11 August 1861, Brandenburg an der Havel – 7 March 1926, Friedenau) was a German zoologist.

He studied mathematics and natural sciences at the Universities of Halle and Berlin, afterwards working as an unpaid volunteer at the Berlin Zoological Museum under Jean Cabanis (1816–1906). In 1892, he was in charge of the department of mammals at the museum, later becoming a curator (1895), and in 1902, attaining the title of professor. In 1924, he was appointed second director at the museum.

During the years 1891–1893, he described 11 new species of reptiles. A species of gecko, Hemidactylus matschiei (Tornier, 1901), is named in his honor. Matschie organized the fifth International Congress of Zoologists in Berlin and was for some years co-editor of the journal Natur und Haus.

Matschie's tree-kangaroo (Dendrolagus matschiei) and Matschie's galago (Galago matschiei) are two species of mammals which bear his name.

== Selected writings ==
In German, except as noted:

- Die Säugthiere Deutsch-Ost-Afrikas, 1895.
- Säugethiere, 1898.
- Die Megachiroptera des Berliner Museums für Naturkunde, 1899.
- Die Fledermäuse des Berliner Museums für Naturkunde, etc., 1899.
- Die Säugetiere der von W. Kükenthal auf Halmahera, Batjan und Nord-Celebes gemachten Ausbeute by Paul Matschie and W G Kükenthal, 1900.
- Le sanglier noir de l'Ituri "Hylochoerus ituriensis", 1906. (in French).
- Mammalia, Aves, Reptilia, Amphibia, Pisces by Paul Matschie, et al. 1909.

== Sources ==
- The eponym dictionary of mammals by Bo Beolens, Michael Watkins, Michael Grayson (biographical information)
