= Tunberg =

Tunberg is a surname. It is a variant of Thunberg. Notable people with the surname include:

- Karl Tunberg (1907−1992), American screenwriter and film producer
- Terence Tunberg (born 1950), American classical philologist
- William Tunberg (disambiguation)
  - William Tunberg (artist) (born 1936), American sculptor
  - William Tunberg (screenwriter), American screenwriter
