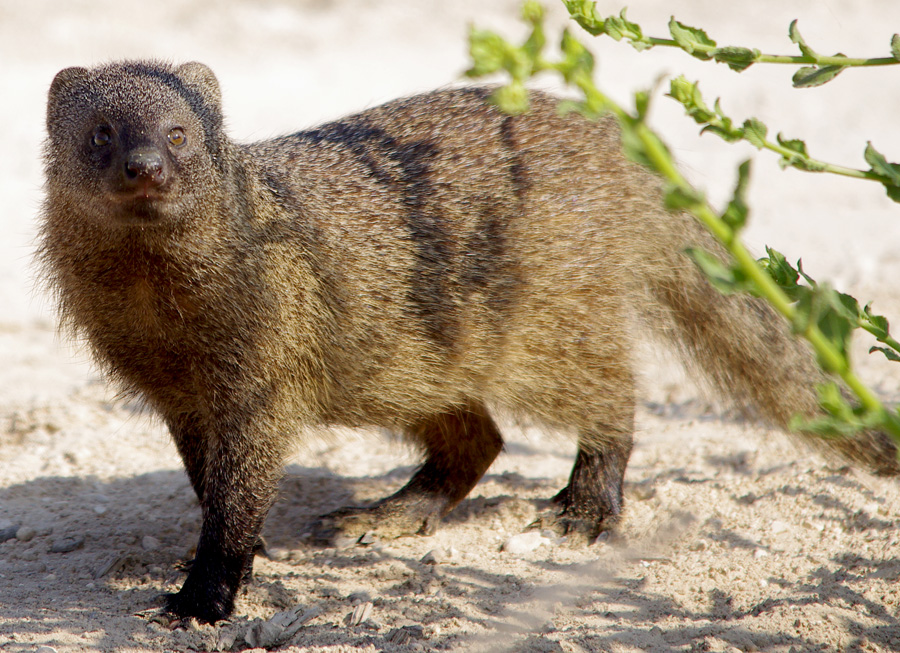

Conservation status
- Least Concern (IUCN 3.1)

Scientific classification
- Kingdom: Animalia
- Phylum: Chordata
- Class: Mammalia
- Infraclass: Placentalia
- Order: Carnivora
- Family: Herpestidae
- Genus: Herpestes
- Species: H. ichneumon

Binomial name
- Herpestes ichneumon (Linnaeus, 1758)
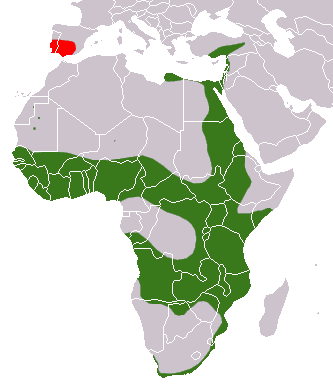
- Egyptian mongoose range (green – native, red – possibly introduced)

Synonyms
- Viverra ichneumon Linnaeus, 1758

= Egyptian mongoose =

Egyptian mongoose Temporal range: Pleistocene–Present

Species of mongoose from Africa and the Mediterranean

The Egyptian mongoose (Herpestes ichneumon), also known as ichneumon (/ɪkˈnjuːmən/), is a mongoose species native to the tropical and subtropical grasslands, savannas, and shrublands of Africa and around the Mediterranean Basin in North Africa, the Middle East and the Iberian Peninsula. Whether it is introduced or native to the Iberian Peninsula is in some doubt. Because of its widespread occurrence, it is listed as Least Concern on the IUCN Red List.

== Characteristics ==
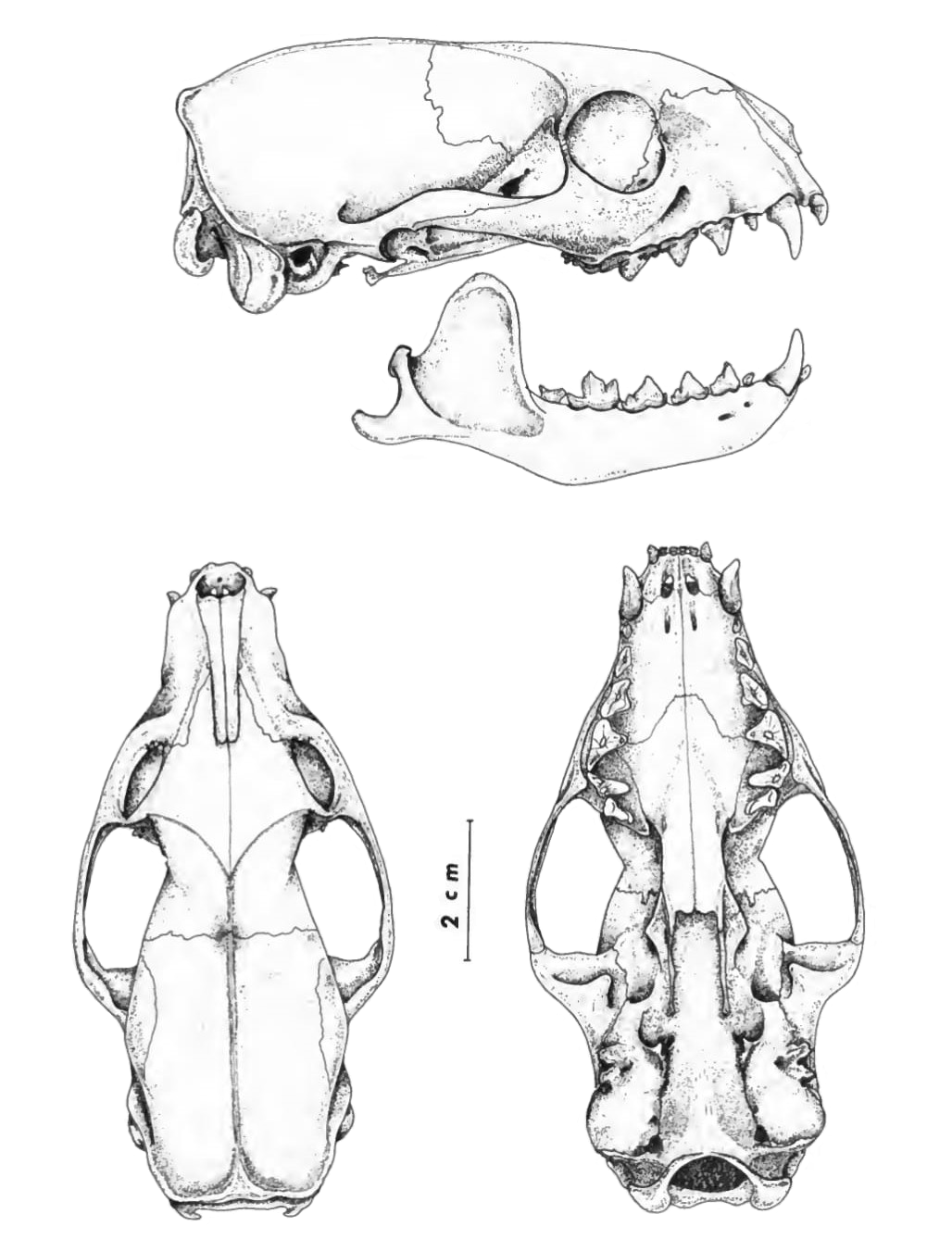
Egyptian mongoose skull

The Egyptian mongoose's long, coarse fur is grey to reddish brown and ticked with brown and yellow flecks. Its snout is pointed, its ears are small. Its slender body is 48–60 cm (1 ft 7 in – 2 ft 0 in) long with a 33–54 cm (1 ft 1 in – 1 ft 9 in) long black tipped tail. Its hind feet and a small area around the eyes are furless. It has 35–40 teeth, with highly developed carnassials, used for shearing meat. It weighs 1.7–4 kg (3.7–8.8 lb).

Sexually dimorphic Egyptian mongooses were observed in Portugal, where some females are smaller than males.

Female Egyptian mongooses have 44 chromosomes, and males 43, as one Y chromosome is translocated to an autosome.

== Distribution and habitat ==
The Egyptian mongoose lives in swampy and marshy habitats near streams, rivers, lakes and in coastal areas. Where it inhabits maquis shrubland in the Iberian Peninsula, it prefers areas close to rivers with dense vegetation. It does not occur in deserts.

It has been recorded in Portugal from north of the Douro River to the south, and in Spain from the central plateau, Andalucía to the Strait of Gibraltar.

In North Africa, it occurs along the coast of the Mediterranean Sea and the Atlas Mountains from Western Sahara, Morocco, Algeria and Tunisia into Libya, and from northern Egypt across the Sinai Peninsula. In Egypt, one individual was observed in Faiyum Oasis in 1993. In the same year, its tracks were recorded in sand dunes close to the coast near Sidi Barrani. An individual was observed on an island in Lake Burullus in the Nile Delta during an ecological survey in the late 1990s. In the Palestinian territories, it was recorded in the Gaza Strip and Jericho Governorate in the West Bank during surveys carried out between 2012 and 2016. In western Syria, it was observed in the Latakia Governorate between 1989 and 1995; taxidermied specimens were offered in local shops. In southern Turkey, it was recorded in the Hatay and Adana Provinces.

In Sudan, it is present in the vicinity of human settlements along the Rahad River and in Dinder National Park. It was also recorded in the Dinder–Alatash protected area complex during surveys between 2015 and 2018. In Ethiopia, the Egyptian mongoose was recorded at elevations of 2,000–3,000 m (6,600–9,800 ft) in the Ethiopian Highlands.

In Senegal, it was observed in 2000 in Niokolo-Koba National Park, which mainly encompasses open habitat dominated by grasses. In Guinea's National Park of Upper Niger, the occurrence of the Egyptian mongoose was first documented during surveys in spring 1997. Surveyors found dead individuals on bushmeat markets in villages located in the vicinity of the park.

In Gabon's Moukalaba-Doudou National Park, it was recorded only in savanna habitats. In the Republic of Congo, it was repeatedly observed in the Western Congolian forest–savanna mosaic of Odzala-Kokoua National Park during surveys in 2007.

In the 1990s, it was considered a common species in Tanzania's Mkomazi National Park.

=== Occurrence in Iberian Peninsula ===
Several hypotheses were proposed to explain the occurrence of the Egyptian mongoose in the Iberian Peninsula:

- TraditionalIy, it was thought to have been introduced following the Muslim invasion in the 8th century.
- Bones of Egyptian mongoose excavated in Spain and Portugal were radiocarbon dated to the first century. The scientists therefore suggested an introduction during the Roman Hispania era and use for eliminating rats and mice in domestic areas.
- Other authors proposed a natural colonisation of the Iberian Peninsula during the Pleistocene across a land bridge when sea levels were low between glacial and interglacial periods. This population would have remained isolated from populations in Africa after the Last Glacial Period.

== Behaviour and ecology ==
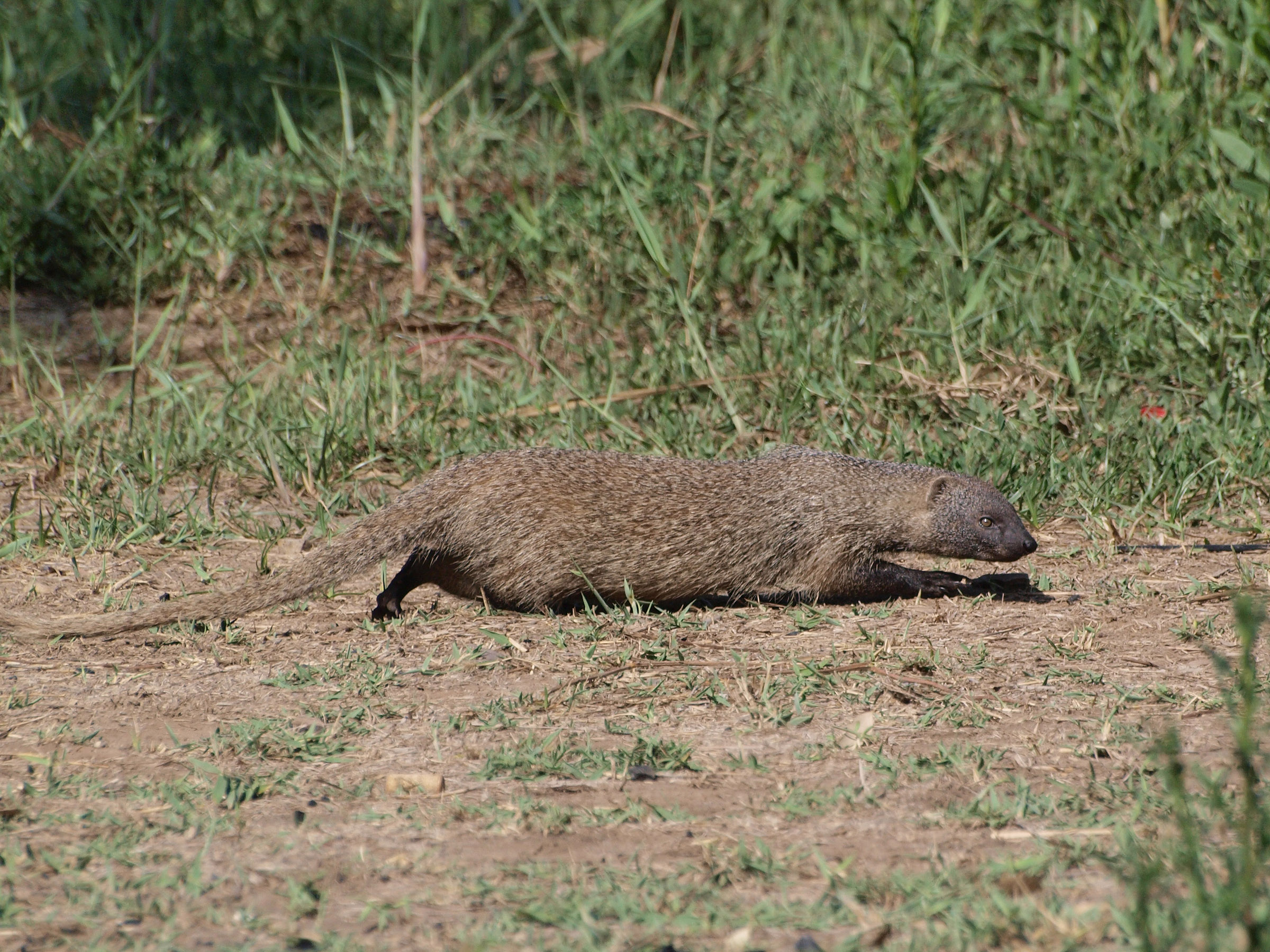
Egyptian mongoose

The Egyptian mongoose is diurnal. In Doñana National Park, single Egyptian mongooses, pairs and groups of up to five individuals were observed. Adult males showed territorial behaviour, and shared their home ranges with one or several females. The home ranges of adult females overlapped to some degree, except in core areas where they raised their offspring.

It preys on rodents, fish, birds, reptiles, amphibians, and insects. It also feeds on fruit and eggs. To crack eggs open, it throws them between its legs against a rock or wall. In Doñana National Park, 30 Egyptian mongooses were radio-tracked in 1985 and their faeces collected. These samples contained remains of European rabbit (Oryctolagus cuniculus), sand lizards (Psammodromus), Iberian spadefoot toad (Pelobates cultripes), greater white-toothed shrew (Crocidura russula), three-toed skink (Chalcides chalcides), dabbling ducks (Anas), western cattle egret (Bubulcus ibis), wild boar (Sus scrofa) meat, Algerian mouse (Mus spretus) and rat species (Rattus). Research in southeastern Nigeria revealed that it also feeds on giant pouched rats (Cricetomys), Temminck's mouse (Mus musculoides), Tullberg's soft-furred mouse (Praomys tulbergi), Nigerian shrew (Crocidura nigeriae), Hallowell's toad (Amietophrynus maculatus), African brown water snake (Afronatrix anoscopus), and Mabuya skinks. It attacks and feeds on venomous snakes, and is mostly resistant to the venom of Palestine vipers, Burton's carpet vipers, Field's horned vipers, desert cobras, Saharan horned vipers, and black-necked spitting cobras.

In Spain, it has been recorded less frequently in areas where the Iberian lynx was reintroduced.

=== Reproduction ===
Captive males and females reach sexual maturity at the age of two years. In Doñana National Park, courtship and mating happens in spring between February and June. Two to three pups are born between mid April and mid August after a gestation of 11 weeks. They are hairless at first, and open their eyes after about a week. Females take care of them for up to one year, occasionally also longer. They start foraging on their own at the age of four months, but compete for food brought back to them after that age. In the wild, Egyptian mongooses probably reach 12 years of age. A captive Egyptian mongoose was over 20 years old. Its generation length is 7.5 years.

== Taxonomy ==
In 1758, Carl Linnaeus described an Egyptian mongoose from the area of the Nile River in Egypt in his work Systema Naturae and gave it the scientific name Viverra ichneumon. H. i. ichneumon (Linnaeus, 1758) is the nominate subspecies. The following zoological specimen were described between the late 18th century and the early 1930s as subspecies:

- Viverra cafra (Gmelin, 1788) − based on a description of a specimen from the Cape of Good Hope.
- Herpestes ichneumon numidicus F. G. Cuvier, 1834 − two individuals from Algiers in Algeria kept in the menagerie of the Muséum d'Histoire Naturelle, France
- Herpestes ichneumon widdringtonii Gray, 1842 − a specimen from Sierra Morena in Spain
- Herpestes angolensis (Bocage, 1890) − a male specimen from Quissange in Angola
- Mungos ichneumon parvidens (Lönnberg, 1908) − three specimens collected near the lower Congo River in Congo Free State
- Mungos ichneumon funestus (Osgood, 1910) − a specimen from Naivasha in British East Africa
- Mungos ichneumon centralis (Lönnberg, 1917) − two specimens from Beni, Democratic Republic of the Congo
- Herpestes ichneumon sangronizi Cabrera, 1924 − a specimen from Mogador in Morocco
- Herpestes caffer sabiensis (Roberts, 1926) − a specimen from Sabi Sand Game Reserve in Southern Africa
- Herpestes cafer mababiensis (Roberts, 1932) − a specimen from Mababe in northern Bechuanaland

In 1811, Johann Karl Wilhelm Illiger subsumed the ichneumon to the genus Herpestes.

== Threats ==
A survey of poaching methods in Israel carried out in autumn 2000 revealed that the Egyptian mongoose is affected by snaring in agricultural areas. Most of the traps found were set up by Thai guest workers. Numerous dried heads of Egyptian mongooses were found in 2007 at the Dantokpa Market in southern Benin, suggesting that it is used as fetish in animal rituals.

== Conservation ==
The Egyptian mongoose is listed on Appendix III of the Berne Convention, and Annex V of the European Union Habitats and Species Directive. In Israel, wildlife is protected by law, and hunting allowed only with a permit.

== In culture ==
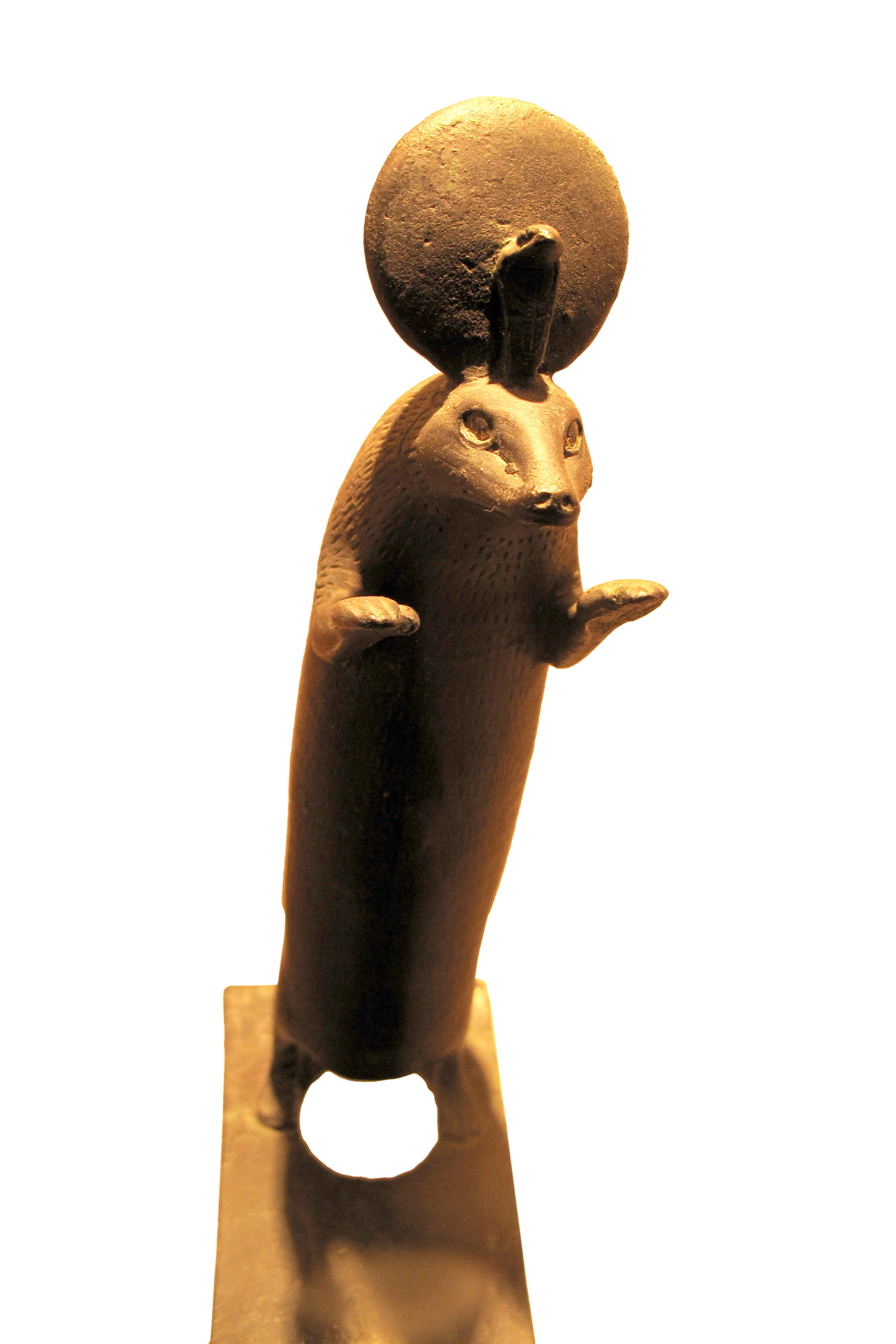
Bronze statue with uraeus and solar disc, Ptolemaic Dynasty of Egypt

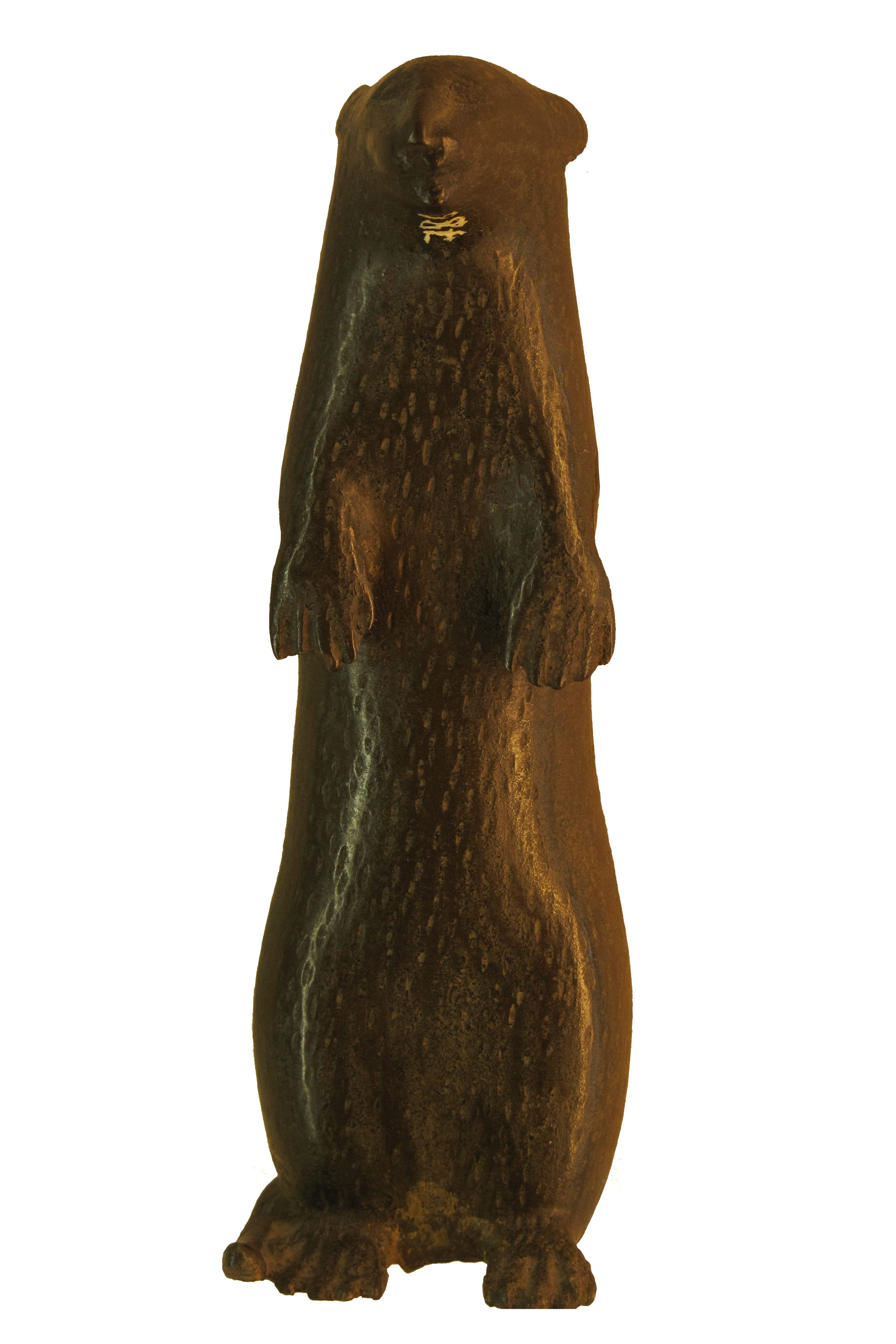
Bronze statue, Ptolemaic Dynasty

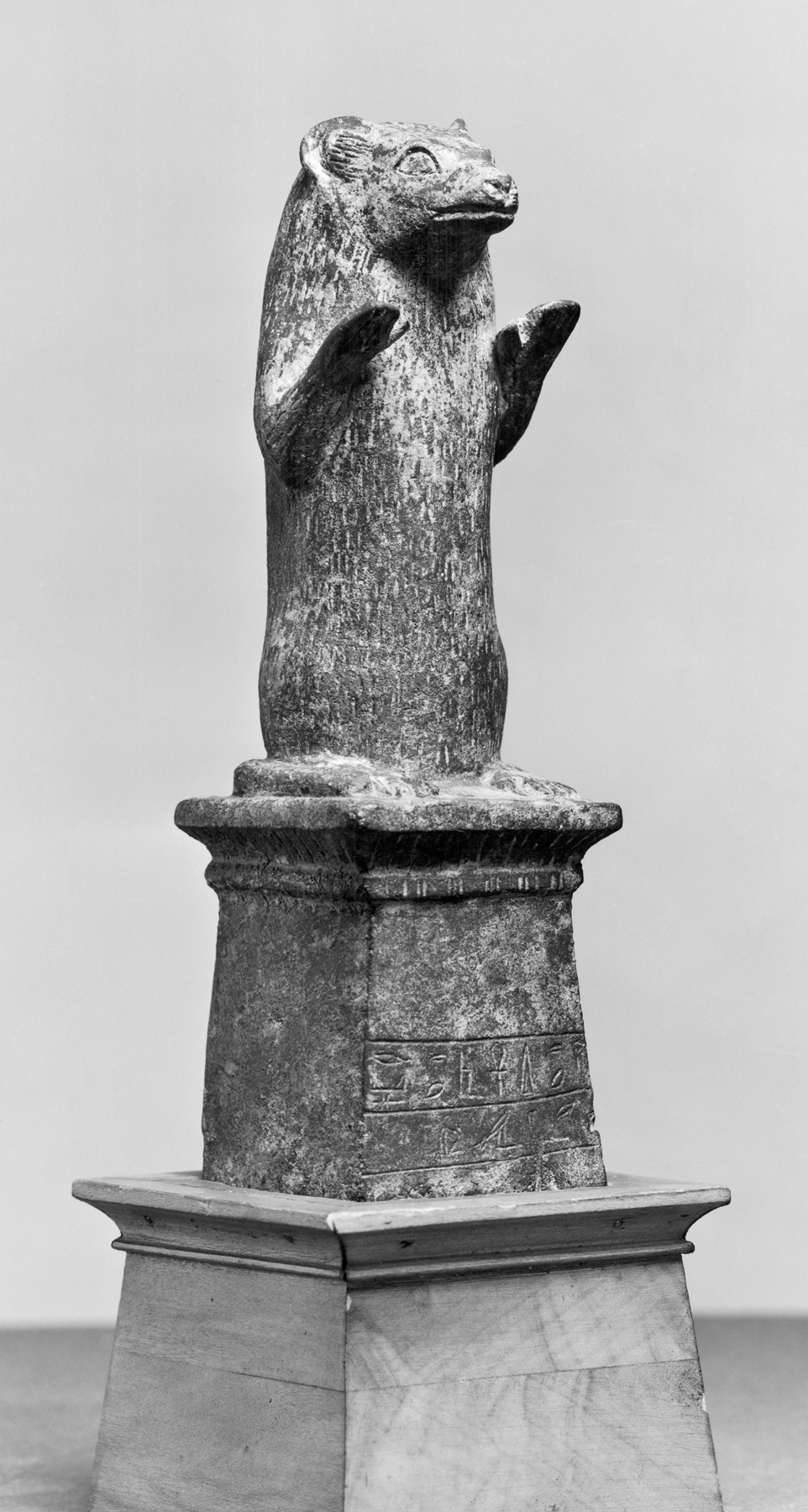
A Late period statue dedicated to the goddess Wadjet, exhibited in Walters Art Museum

Mummified remains of four Egyptian mongooses were excavated in the catacombs of Anubis at Saqqara during works started in 2009. At the cemetery of Beni Hasan, an Egyptian mongoose on a leash is depicted in the tomb of Baqet I dating to the Eleventh Dynasty of Egypt. The Egyptian goddess Mafdet, who protected humans from snake and scorpion venom, was associated with the mongoose.

The American poet John Greenleaf Whittier wrote a poem as an elegy for an ichneumon, which had been brought to Haverhill Academy in Haverhill, Massachusetts, in 1830. The long lost poem was published in the November 1902 issue of "The Independent" magazine. The Sherlock Holmes canon also features an ichneumon in the short story The Adventure of the Crooked Man, though due to Watson's description of its appearance and its owner's history in India it is likely to actually be an Indian grey mongoose.

== See also ==
- Ichneumon (In medieval zoology)
