= William Tunberg =

William Tunberg may refer to:

- William Tunberg (artist) (born 1936), American sculptor
- William Tunberg (screenwriter), American screenwriter
