= Madworkshop Foundation =

California-based non-profit foundation

The Martin Architecture and Design Workshop (MADWORKSHOP) is a Los Angeles, California-based non-profit foundation that offers fellowships and educational programs for artists and designers.

MADWORKSHOP supports educational programs at the University of Southern California, Art Center College of Design and the USI Accademia di Architettura, Mendrisio in Switzerland. Supported projects include product and fashion design as well as architectural projects.

== History ==
MADWORKSHOP was first conceived in 2005 when noted Los Angeles architect and former A.C. Martin Inc. design principal and co-chairman David C. Martin, FAIA was approached to teach a furniture design studio at the USC School of Architecture. The hands-on fabrication class generated interest from students and connected with a greater trend in the study of design. This led Martin to create the Furniture Studio at USC School of Architecture, which has become a key staple of the undergraduate curriculum. The Furniture Studio teaches students how to build and weld, culminating with each student fabricating a full-scale furniture piece. A select number of students with extraordinary designs are awarded MADWORKSHOP fellowships to continue developing their projects with the goal of bringing them to market.

In 2013, David and his wife Mary Klaus Martin sponsored a class at the USC School of Architecture taught by architect and assistant professor R. Scott Mitchell. The course challenged students to design a site-specific pedestrian bridge titled the Arroyo Bridge. The long history of collaborations led David and Mary Martin to establish MADWORKSHOP. Since its inception in 2015, the foundation has supported numerous fellows and projects. The Foundation has also sponsored the USC MADWORKSHOP Homeless Studio as well as the Re-Defining Public Furniture & Fixtures Design course at Art Center, which produced the permanent seating installation, Sanke, at MOCA (Museum of Contemporary Art) in downtown Los Angeles.

== Projects ==
=== Homes for Hope ===
The USC Homeless Studio coursework explored the architect's role in helping to solve the Los Angeles homeless crisis. The concept of the Studio was conceived in 2016 by Mary Klaus Martin, co-founder of MADWORKSHOP, and developed in partnership with the USC School of Architecture and USC faculty members R. Scott Mitchell and Sofia Borges. It was driven by the need to address Los Angeles’ rapidly accelerating homelessness crisis. The Homeless Studio became a living laboratory where architecture students used the semester to create stackable transitional housing modules, called Homes for Hope. The modules measure 92 square feet and include a bed, a desk, and storage. The modules are set up in groups of 30 units with one shared base unit, which includes a bathroom, living and dining space, and a courtyard. Homes for Hope, the award-winning solution developed in the studio for emergency stabilization housing, won the Fast Company World Changing Ideas Award in 2017. In December, 2017, USC faculty members R. Scott Mitchell and Sofia Borges released Give Me Shelter, published by ORO Editions, a book detailing the experience of architecture students taking on the homeless crisis in Los Angeles during the MADWORKSHOP Homeless Studio, with a foreword by Mayor Eric Garcetti.

=== Moca Grand Plaza ===
In September 2017, The MADWORKSHOP Foundation sponsored a redesign of the facade and entrance area of the Museum of Contemporary Art, Los Angeles Grand Avenue location. The MOCA project comprised students who developed a design proposal. Throughout the course, students collaborated with MOCA director Philippe Vergne and curator Helen Molesworth to create the proposal for the museum's plaza.

=== Light and Matter Studio ===
MADWORKSHOP collaborated with Fondo Ambiente Italiano (FAI) to launch the Light and Matter Studio. Designer Riccardo Blumerat worked with students to create an exhibition entitled Light Theaters, inspired by the Sacro Monte di Varallo, a UNESCO World Heritage Site in the nearby town of Varese.
