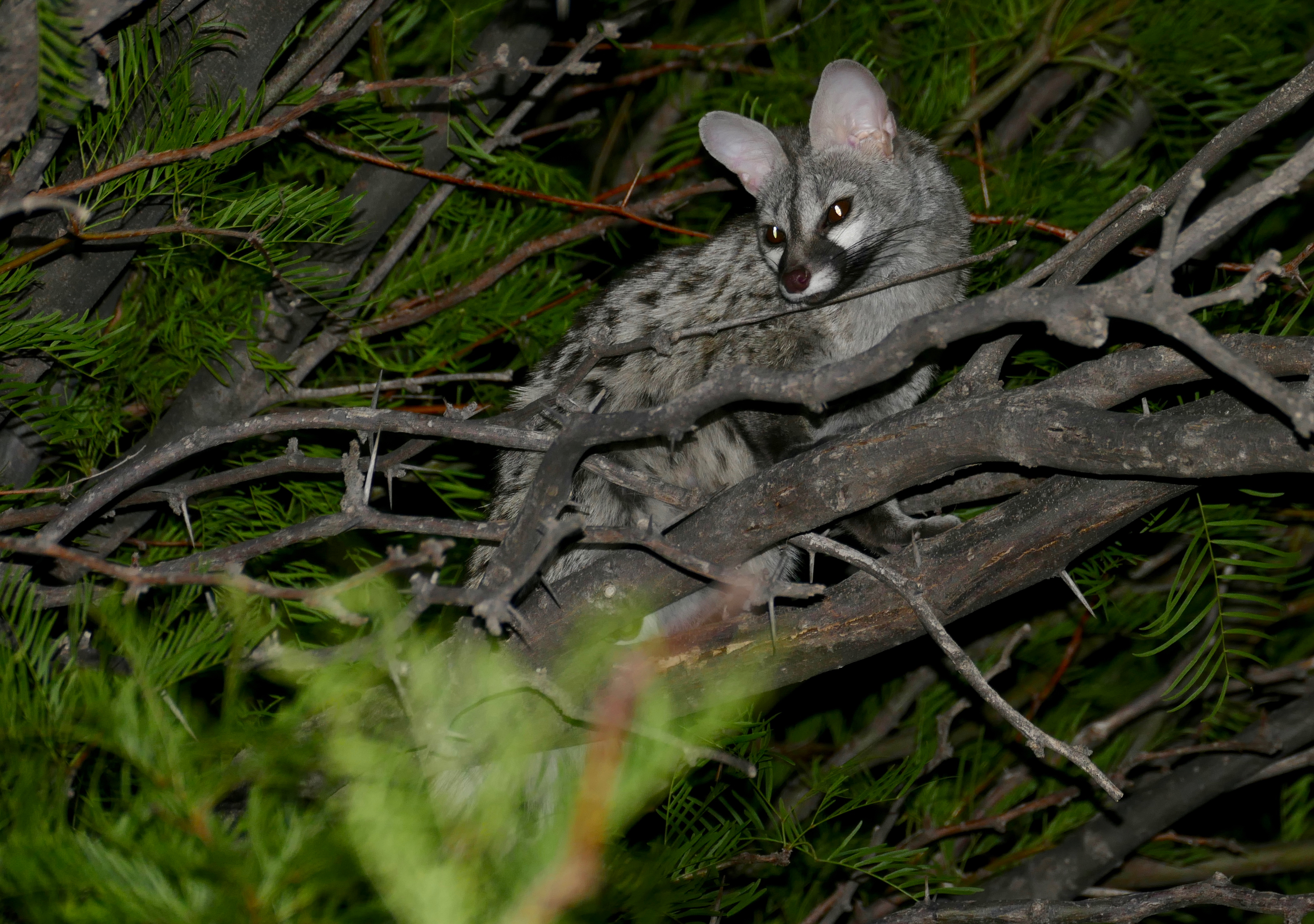
- Female South African small-spotted genet at Nossob Camp, Kgalagadi Transfrontier Park in the Northern Cape, South Africa

Conservation status
- Least Concern (IUCN 3.1)

Scientific classification
- Kingdom: Animalia
- Phylum: Chordata
- Class: Mammalia
- Infraclass: Placentalia
- Order: Carnivora
- Family: Viverridae
- Genus: Genetta
- Species: G. felina

Binomial name
- Genetta felina (Thunberg, 1811)

Synonyms
- macrura (Jentink, 1892); bella Matschie, 1902; pulchra Matschie, 1902; ludia O. Thomas & Schwann, 1906

= South African small-spotted genet =

Species of mammal endemic to Southern Africa

The South African small-spotted genet (Genetta felina) is a species of genet endemic to Southern Africa.

== Taxonomy ==
Genetta felina was first described in 1811 by Carl Peter Thunberg. It was considered a subspecies of the common genet (Genetta genetta) but since MSW3 in 2005, was split off and classified as its own species. Its classification is disputed.

== Distribution ==
Genetta felina is found in South Africa, Angola, Botswana, Namibia and Zambia. It lives in woodland savanna, grassland, thickets, and dry vlei areas that border deserts.

== Appearance ==
The South African small-spotted genet is identified by the white tip on its tail, dark feet and dark chin.

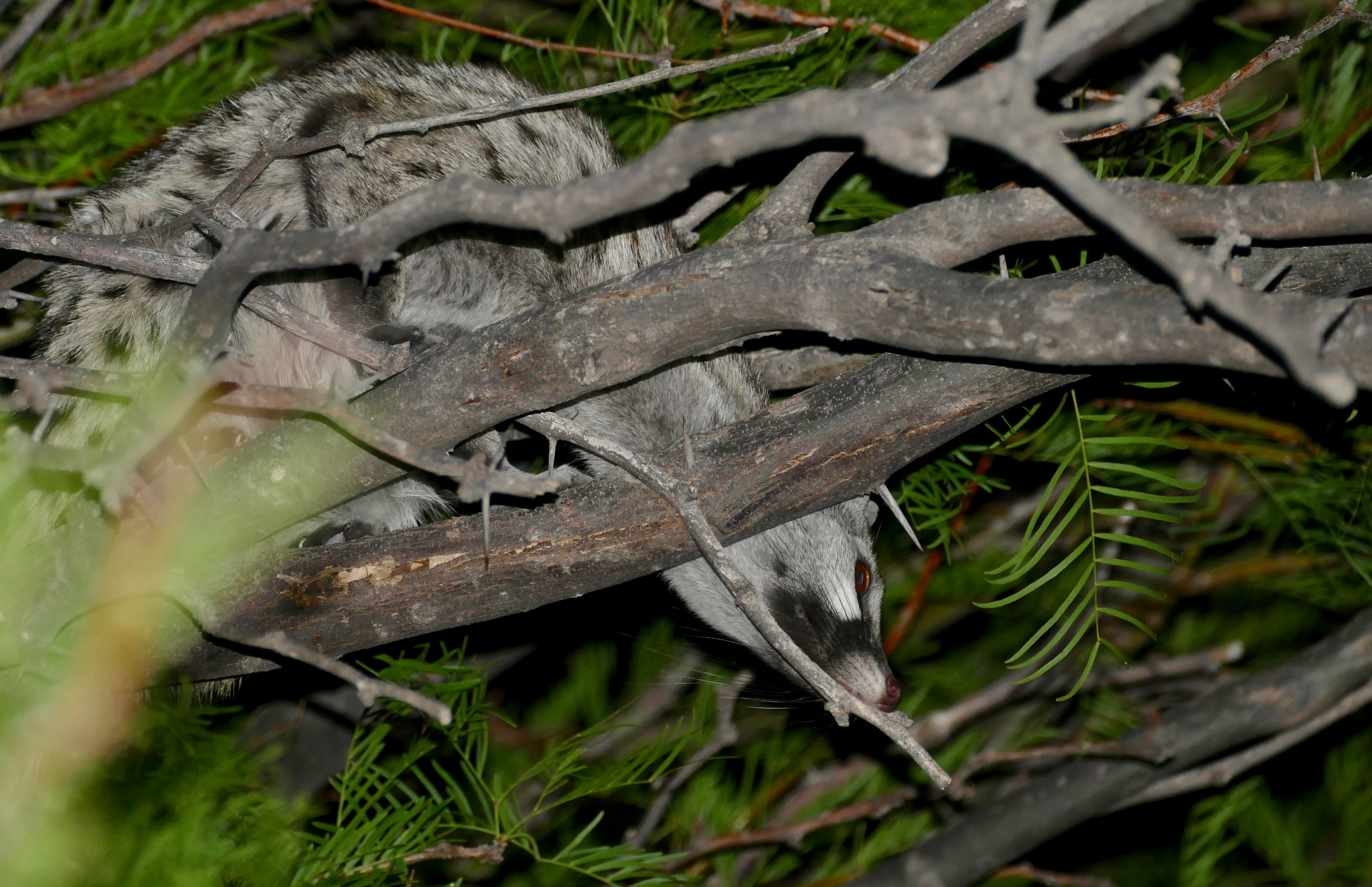

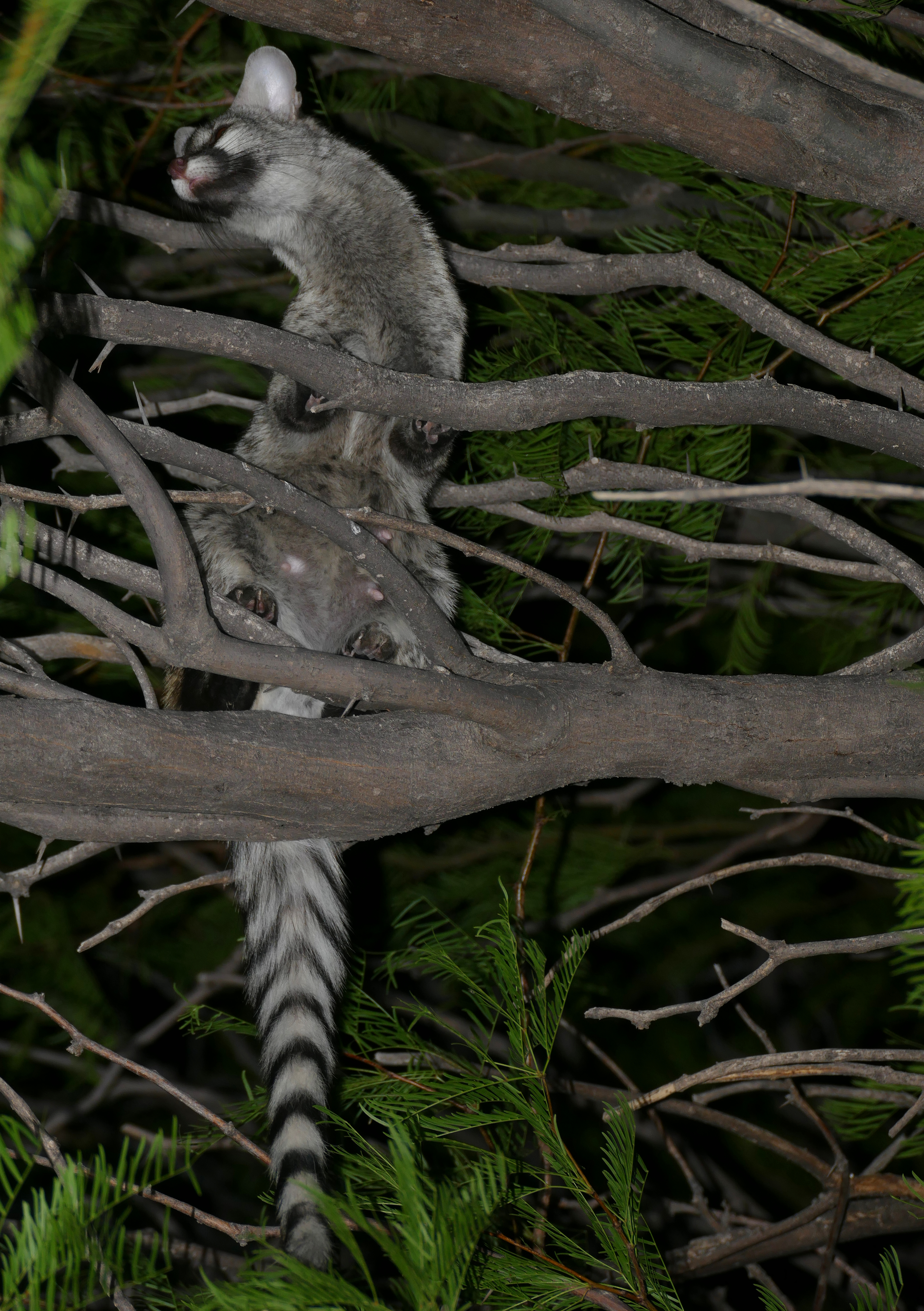

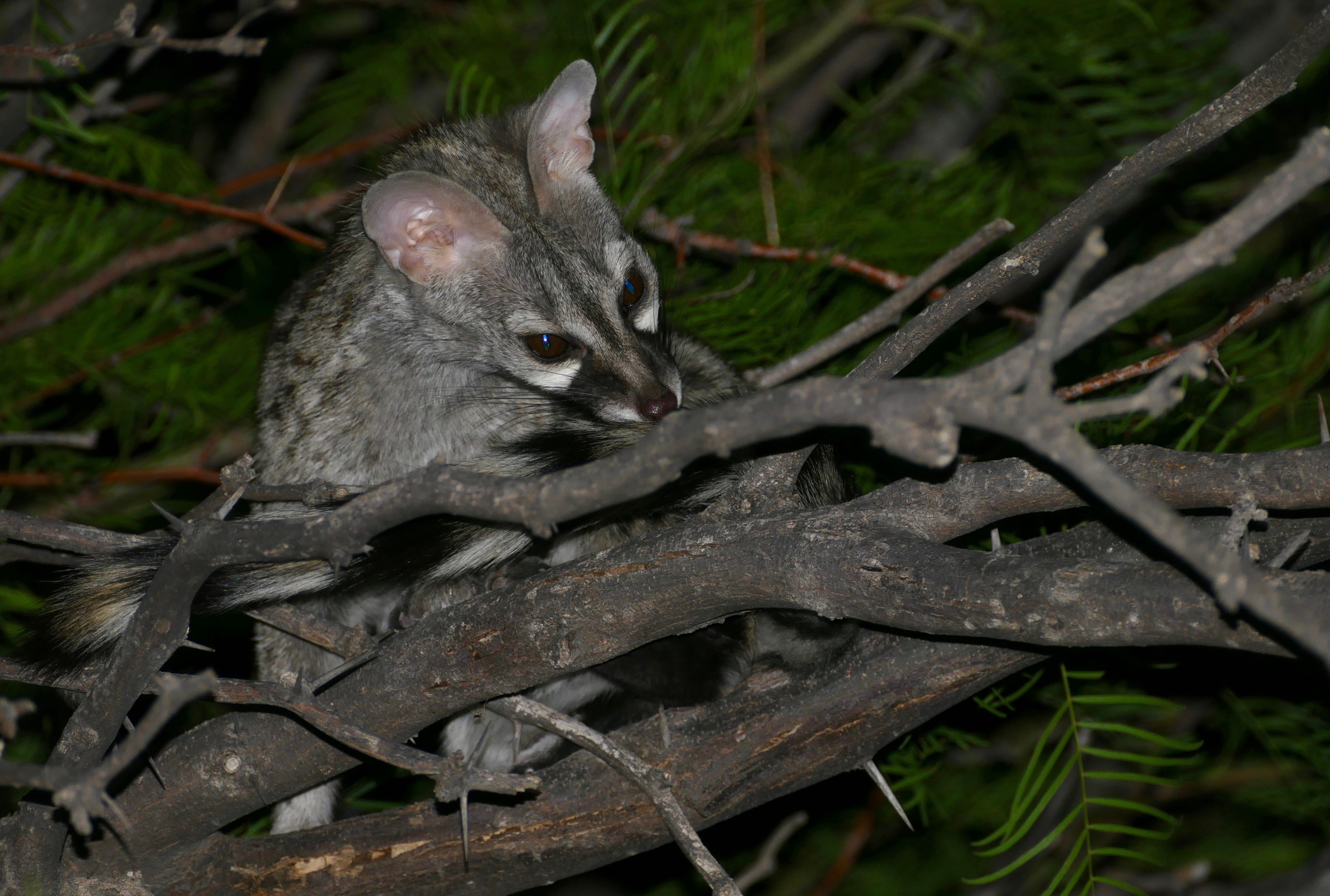
