= That's My Baby! (1944 film) =

1944 film by William A. Berke

- Directed by: William Berke
- Written by: Nicholas T. Barrows (writer); William Tunberg (writer); Irving Wallace (story)
- Produced by: Walter Colmes (producer); Dave Fleischer (associate producer)
- Starring: Richard Arlen; Ellen Drew; Leonid Kinskey
- Cinematography: Robert Pittack
- Edited by: Robert Jahns
- Music by: Jay Chernis
- Production company: Walter Colmes Productions
- Distributed by: Republic Pictures
- Release date: September 14, 1944
- Running time: 68 minutes
- Country: United States
- Language: English

That's My Baby! is a 1944 American film directed by William Berke and starring Richard Arlen, Ellen Drew, and Leonid Kinskey.

== Plot ==
Phineas Moody, the head of Moody Comics is in terrible health. His worried daughter Betty calls in two doctors who discover that Phineas hasn't laughed in decades. Betty and her future husband Tim Jones fill the Moody mansion full of a variety of vaudeville acts to make Phineas laugh again. When that fails, the pair track down Phineas's estranged wife Hettie, who Betty hasn't seen since childhood. The film concludes with the making of an animated cartoon that is shown to Phineas and Hettie.

== Cast ==
- Richard Arlen as Tim Jones
- Ellen Drew as Betty Moody
- Leonid Kinskey as Doctor Svatsky
- Minor Watson as R. P. (Phineas) Moody
- Richard Bailey as Hilton Payne
- Marjorie Manners as Miss Wilson
- Madeline Grey as Hettie Moody
- Alex Callam as Doctor Calloway
- P.J. Kelly as Henry Austin, Barber
- William 'Billy' Benedict as Office Boy
- Jack Chefe as Pierre, a Waiter
- Mike Riley and His Musical Maniacs as Themselves
- Freddie Fisher and His Schnikelfritz Orchestra as Themselves
- Lita Baron as herself, Isabelita
- The Guadalajara Trio as Themselves
- Gene Rodgers as the Boogie-Woogie Piano Player
- Peppy and Peanuts as Themselves
- Lyle Latell as Office Worker Comedy Routine
- Alphonse Bergé as himself
- Doris Duane as herself
- Adia Kuznetzoff as himself (Russian Singer)
- Chuy Reyes and His Orchestra as Themselves
- Al Mardo and His Dog as Themselves
- Dewey "Pigmeat" Markham as Pigmeat, the Butler
