= David C. Martin =

American architect

David C. Martin FAIA
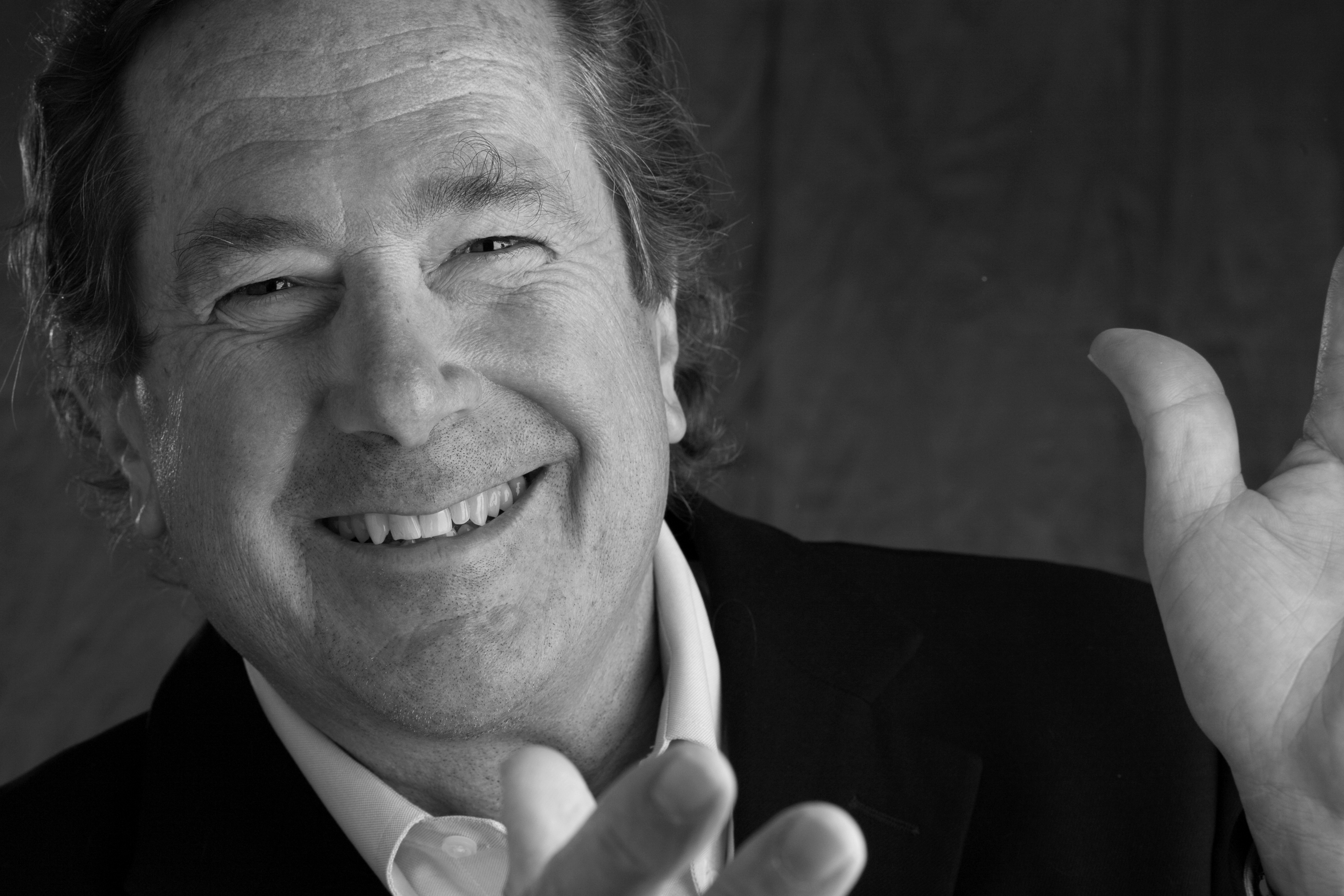
- Born: Los Angeles, California, United States
- Occupation: Architect
- Buildings: New Wilshire Grand; Figueroa at Wilshire; Fish Interfaith Center; Madera Courthouse; Springleaf Tower; Hollenbeck Police Station

David C. Martin is an American architect and former design principal of Los Angeles-based firm A.C. Martin Partners. Since joining the company in 1968, he has overseen the creation of Figueroa at Wilshire, formerly Sanwa Bank Plaza and the Wilshire Grand. Commissioned by Korean Airlines, the glass-sheathed complex includes office space and a luxury hotel. The project generated headlines when it broke records for the largest continuous concrete pour. On February 15, 2014, hundreds of trucks — accompanied by a marching band and speeches — tipped some 80 million pounds of concrete into the foundation for 18 hours straight.

== History and career ==
David Martin is the third generation of architects to join A.C. Martin Partners, founded in 1906 by his grandfather, Albert C. Martin. David became a member of the family firm after completing his undergraduate degree at the University of Southern California School of Architecture in 1966 and his master's degree at Columbia University Graduate School of Architecture a year later. According to the Los Angeles Times, A.C. Martin Partners is responsible for more than half of all major buildings erected in downtown Los Angeles since World War II, including landmark corporate headquarters, civic buildings, theaters, churches and more.

Many of the firm's projects were erected in the period following World War II, when growth and confidence typified Southern California, says David Martin in an interview for the National Building Museum in Washington, D.C.: “The work the firm created at the time — for TRW, the Department of Water and Power, and more — expressed a faith in the future.” As of 2016, A.C. Martin Partners’ chief executive officer is David's cousin and fellow architect, Christopher C. Martin. Christopher is a founding member of the Los Angeles Business Improvement District, which has championed the area's economic vitality while improving its friendliness and safety, according to the Los Angeles Area Chamber of Commerce. Among other honors, David and Christopher were named USC Distinguished Alumni in 2006.

Often accompanying David Martin's designs are public art installations, including works by leading artists Mark di Suvero, Bruce Nauman, Frank Stella, Robert Rauschenberg, and Michael Heizer in the plaza of the former Wells Fargo Headquarters at 444 South Flower. The Architect’s Newspaper called the plaza “an inspiration for the rest of the city.”

The interiors of David Martin's designs also feature artists. The Fish Interfaith Center at Chapman University, in Orange, California, uses the works of Lita Albuquerque, Richard Turner, William Tunberg, Norie Sato, and Susan Nardulli to evoke a spiritual journey. “In ecclesiastical design, architecture orchestrates a path from the material to the spiritual,” says Martin in an article in Interior Design magazine. According to the article, visitors pass by a minaret-like tower and a garden of herbs and grasses before entering the building via a colonnade and stainless-steel-and-glass doors. Once inside the sanctuary, they see a gold-colored anodized-aluminum altarpiece depicting the sun and moon and brightly colored art-glass windows, among other works. In comparing the Fish Interfaith Center to Le Corbusier’s Nôtre Dame du Haut, in Ronchamp, France, Interior Design called the correspondence “divine inspiration.”

Martin is a self-described artist and craftsman who watercolors and fabricates furniture, lamps, and other objects. He also teaches furniture design classes at USC's School of Architecture. He has long partnered with his wife, Mary Klaus Martin, to make many contributions to their city. David is on the board of Los Angeles Conservancy, while Mary has been board chairperson of the Cultural Heritage Commission, among other posts. The American Institute of Architects recognized her civic involvement with its Good Government Award in 2008. Mary is also a member of the Kennedy Center’s National Committee for the Performing Arts, in Washington, D.C., and she and David are supporters of New York City–based dance company Ballets with a Twist.

== Additional resources ==
- Boniface, Russel. "Native American Tribe’s Gift Helps A.C. Martin Partners, Hillier Realize New Library in Fresno”, AIArchitect, January 26, 2007. Web. April 7, 2014.
- “New Police Station Protects and Serves Community”, AIArchitect, August 16, 2004. Web. April 7, 2014
- "Native American History in Tomorrow’s Library: Henry Madden Library at California State University”, ArchNewsNow, August 20, 2007. Web. April 7, 2014
- "Cal/EPA Shines in LEED-EB Pilot”, Environmental Building News, December 1, 2003. Web. April 7, 2014
- "AC Martin Partners Design Scores a LEED First", Interior Design, April 28, 2004. Web. April 7, 2014
- Cohen, Edie. “Fertile Crescent”, Interior Design, July 1, 2001.
- Cohen, Edie. “Poolside Manner: David Martin’s LA Poolhouse”;, Interior Design, October 1, 2012. Web. April 7, 2014
