= Alphonse Bergé =

English-American entertainer (1885–1980)

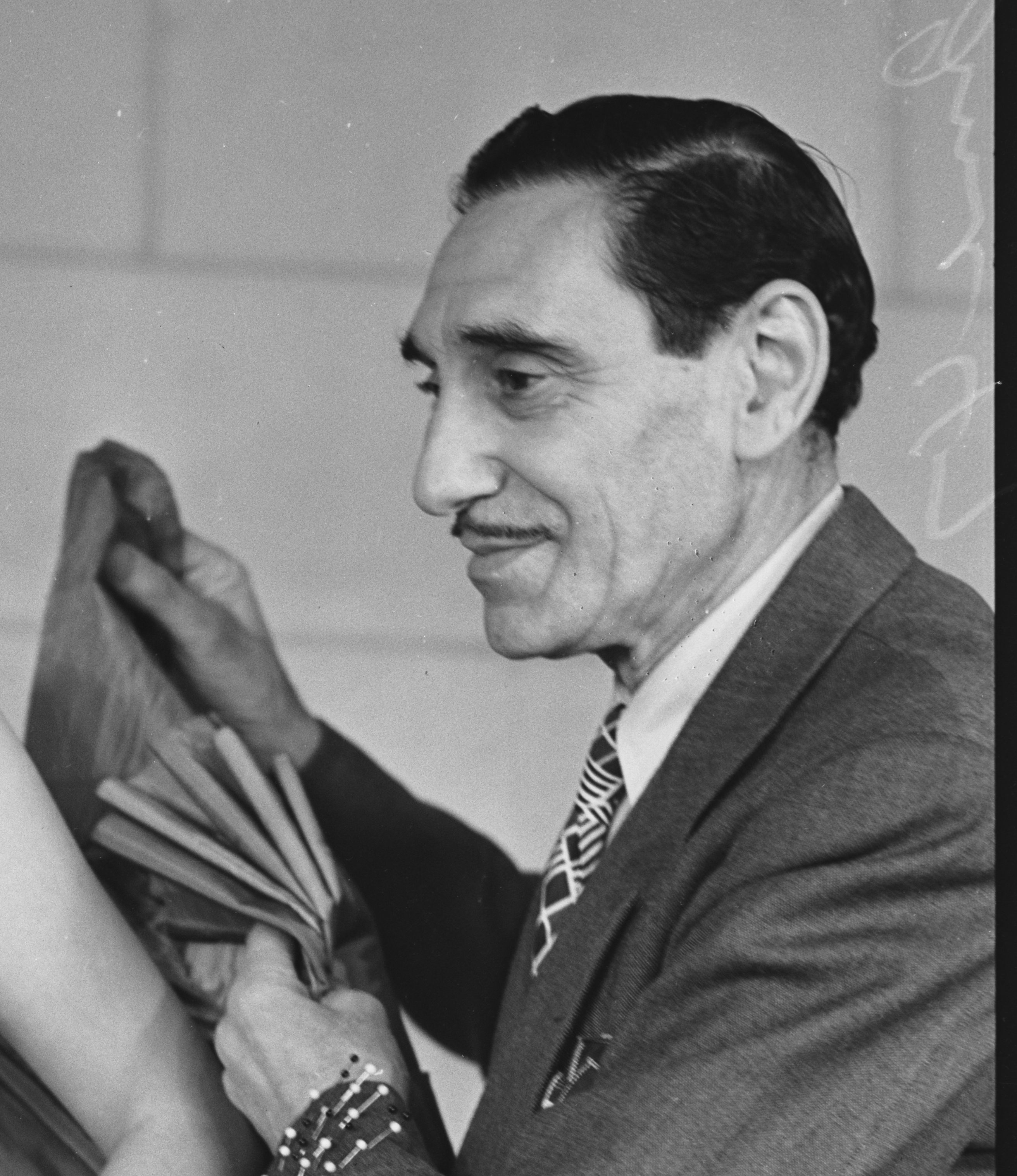
- Alphonse Berge (The Great Drapo), Sydney, 1947
- Born: Albert Berg; July 12, 1885; Islington, London, England
- Died: June 23, 1980 (aged 94); Santa Ana, California, U.S.
- Other name: The Great Drapo
- Occupation: Vaudeville performer
- Years active: 1910s–1960s

Albert Berg (July 12, 1885 – June 23, 1980), known by the stage name Alphonse Bergé, or simply Alphonse, was an English-American vaudeville and variety show entertainer, who performed as The Great Drapo.

== Life and career ==
He was born in Islington, London, England, where he started work as a window dresser. He married, and in 1904 emigrated to the U.S., where he found work as an actor and later became a naturalized citizen. Over subsequent years Berg took the stage name "M. Alphonse Bergé".

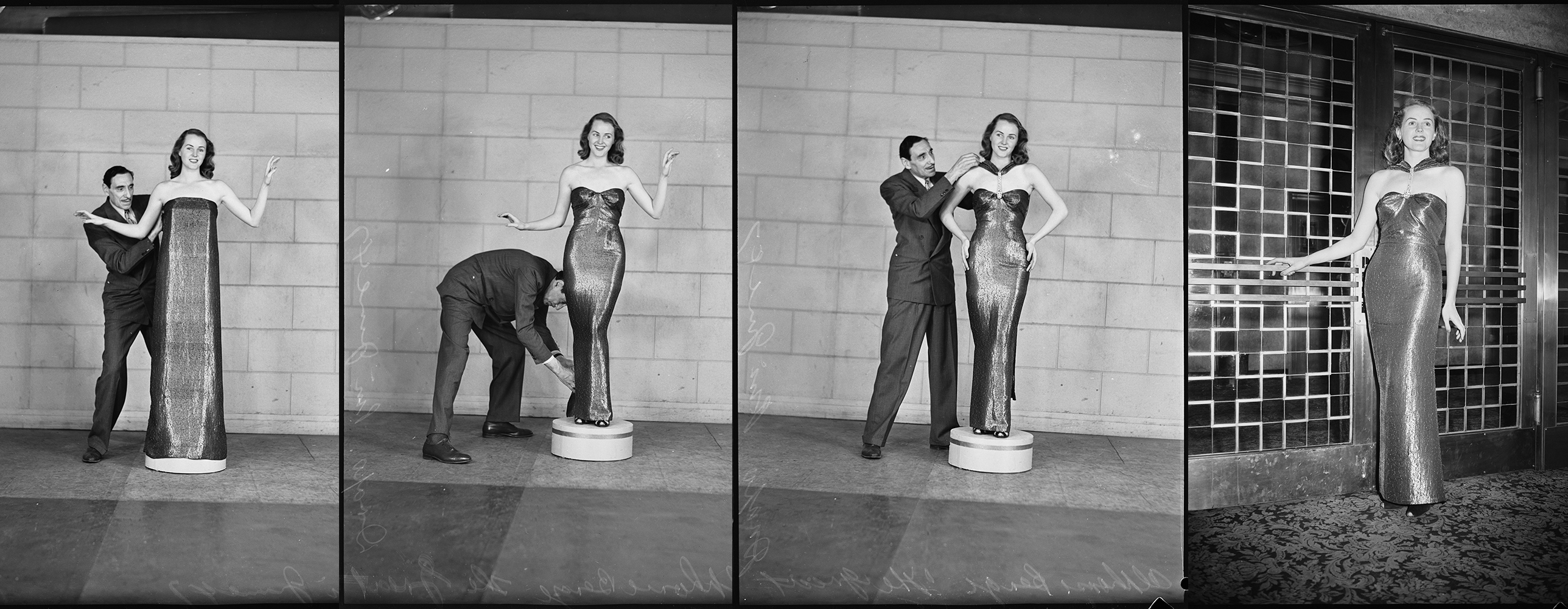
Montage of Alphonse Berge dressing model Dorn Fraser, Sydney, June 1947

He perfected a stage act which involved him taking a single bolt of fabric and, by draping, folding and twisting the material around a live fashion model's body at lightning speed, without the use of pins or stitching, was able to produce an elegant and wearable dress or ball gown in a few minutes. Using several models in a routine titled "Creations", this became a popular opening act in vaudeville shows in the 1920s and 1930s. Sometimes credited as a dress designer, he appeared in a Pathé short in 1923, and in the 1937 Bing Crosby film Double or Nothing. In 1939, billed as the Great Drapo, he performed his act at the New York World's Fair, and he featured in Ken Murray's Blackouts in New York in 1943 and again in 1949. In 1944 he featured in the film That's My Baby.

He performed in nightclubs and made occasional television appearances in the 1950s and early 1960s before retiring. He died in Santa Ana, California, in 1980 at the age of 94, and not at an earlier date as some sources suggest.
