= Thunberg =

Thunberg is a Swedish ornamental surname composed of the elements tun 'courtyard, fence' + berg 'mountain'. Notable people with the surname include:

- Anna Sofia Sevelin (née Thunberg; 1790–1871), Swedish opera singer
- Carl Peter Thunberg (1743–1828), Swedish naturalist
- Clas Thunberg (1893–1973), Finnish speed skater
- Greta Thunberg (born 2003), Swedish climate activist
- Lage Thunberg (1905–1977), Swedish Air Force general
- Olof Thunberg (1925–2020), Swedish actor and director
- Svante Thunberg (born 1969), Swedish actor, producer and author
- Torsten Thunberg (1873–1952), Swedish physiologist

== See also ==
- Tunberg
