= Dinder National Park =

National park in Sudan

- IUCN category II (national park)
- Dinder National Park boundaries.

- Location within Sudan
- Coordinates: 12.29°N 35.48°E
- Area: 10,000 km^{2} (3,900 sq mi)
- Established: 1935

Ramsar Wetland
- Designated: 7 January 2005
- Reference no.: 1461

Dinder National Park is a national park and biosphere reserve in eastern Sudan, and is connected to Ethiopia's Alitash National Park.

== Location ==
Dinder lies approximately 400 kilometres (250 mi) southeast of Khartoum, on either side of the Dinder River bounded to the north by the Rahad River.

The town of Dinder (93 kilometres (58 mi) northwest) acts as a gateway for tourists wishing to enter the Park.

== History ==
The area of Dinder was heavily populated when it was first visited by Europeans in 1861. In the 1880s, at the time of the Mahdist War and a famine, the human population vanished. Alfred Harrison found only traces of human habitation in 1925. Dinder was established as a park in 1935 following the London Convention of 1933 and designated in 1979 as a member of the World Network of Biosphere Reserves. In 1983, the park was extended 2,630 km^{2} (1,020 sq mi) towards the west.

== Ecology ==
Dinder National Park is ecologically significant because it falls on the ecotone between the Sahel and Ethiopian Highlands ecoregions. It contains three distinct ecosystems:

- riverine - riparian zone
- woodland
- maya (oxbow lake).

The park is home to 27 species of large mammals such as leopard, cheetah, more than 160 bird species, 32 fish species, and small mammals, bats, reptiles, and amphibians. It is in a major flyway used by birds migrating between Eurasia and Africa. There are many North African ostriches residing in the national park as well.

Dinder National Park hosts a healthy population of lions.

=== Threats ===
The ecology of the park is threatened by encroachment from cattle herders who are being displaced from their traditional grazing lands by the expansion of crop agriculture, through the fundamental cause of expanding regional population. Populations of migrant grazers, including tiang, Roan, waterbuck and reebuck, are under additional pressure as land outside the park that they migrate across has been converted to farmland. Game counts between 1971 and 2001 have shown a precipitous decline in most large mammal species, with the population of waterbuck falling by 85%, reedbuck by 72%, and oribi by 68%. Other species have been extirpated in Dinder since was gazetted, including African bush elephant, black rhinoceros, hippopotamus, tora hartebeest, Nubian giraffe, Soemmerring's gazelle, and the Nile crocodile.

Dinder National Park has been a habitat for the painted hunting dog (Lycaon pictus), but this endangered canid declined in this region.
