= Figueroa at Wilshire =

Skyscraper in downtown Los Angeles, California

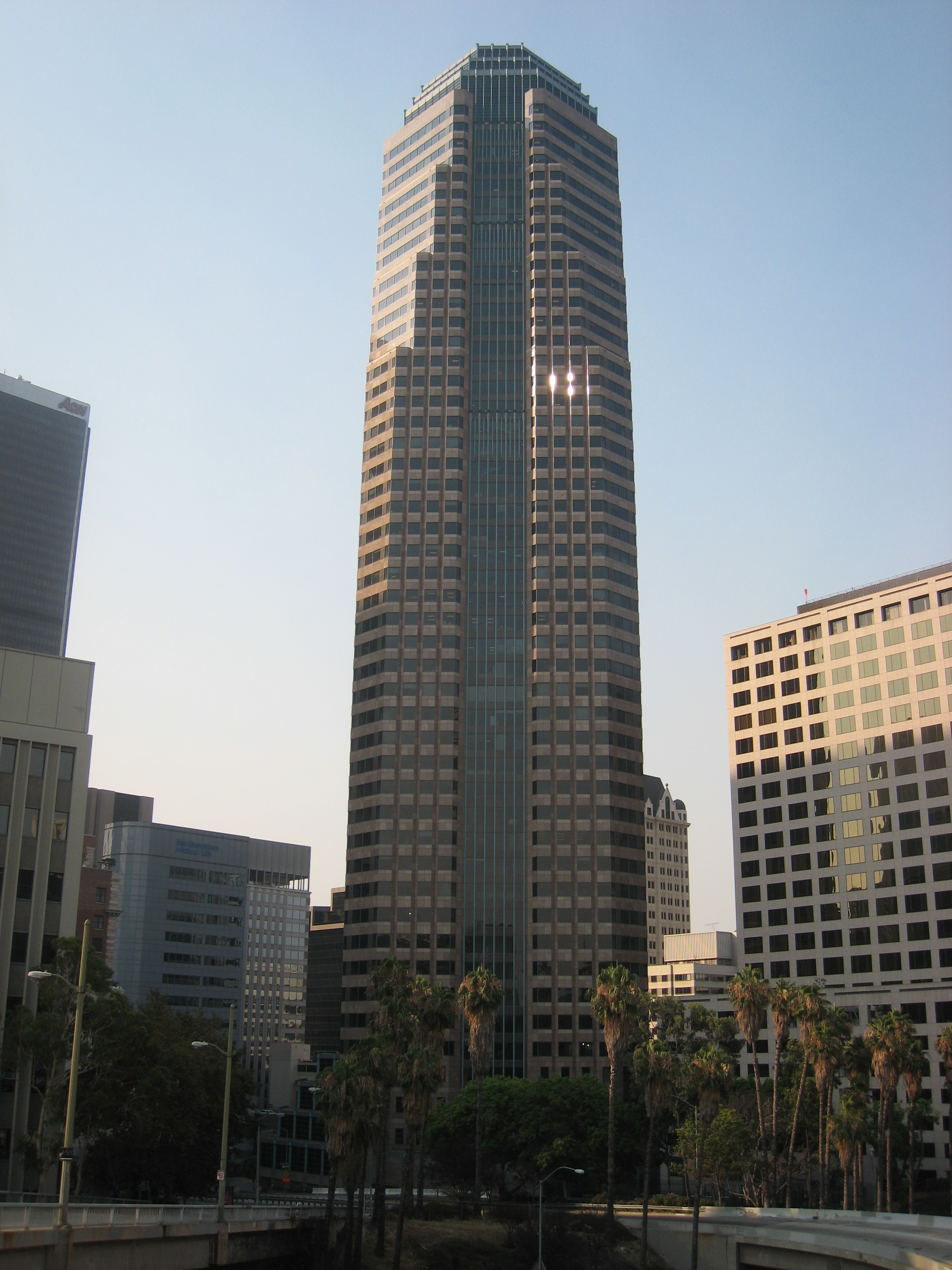
- Interactive map of the Figueroa at Wilshire area
- Alternative names: Mitsui Fudoson Tower; Sanwa Bank Plaza; United California Bank

General information
- Type: Commercial offices
- Architectural style: Postmodernism
- Location: 601 South Figueroa Street; Los Angeles, California, USA
- Coordinates: 34.0507°N 118.2593°W
- Construction started: 1988
- Completed: 1990
- Owner: Brookfield Properties

Height
- Roof: 218.54 m (717.0 ft)

Technical details
- Floor count: 53; 4 below ground
- Floor area: 96,294 m^{2} (1,036,500 sq ft)

Design and construction
- Architect: Albert C. Martin & Associates
- Developer: Hines Interests Limited Partnership
- Structural engineer: CBM Engineers

Figueroa at Wilshire, formerly Sanwa Bank Plaza, is a 53-story, 218.5 m (717 ft) skyscraper in Los Angeles, California, United States. It is the eighth-tallest building in Los Angeles. It was designed by Albert C. Martin & Associates, and developed by Hines Interests Limited Partnership. It won the Rose Award for "Outstanding New Office Building" in 1991. The tower was constructed from 1988 to 1990 on the site of the former St. Paul's Episcopal Cathedral.

== Major tenants ==
- PricewaterhouseCoopers
- ACE Group
- Cozen O'Connor
- Milbank LLP
- SNR Denton
- Morgan Stanley
- Cushman & Wakefield
- HCC Surety Group
- Gannett Fleming

== See also ==
- List of tallest buildings in Los Angeles
- List of tallest buildings in the United States
