= William Tunberg (artist) =

American artist

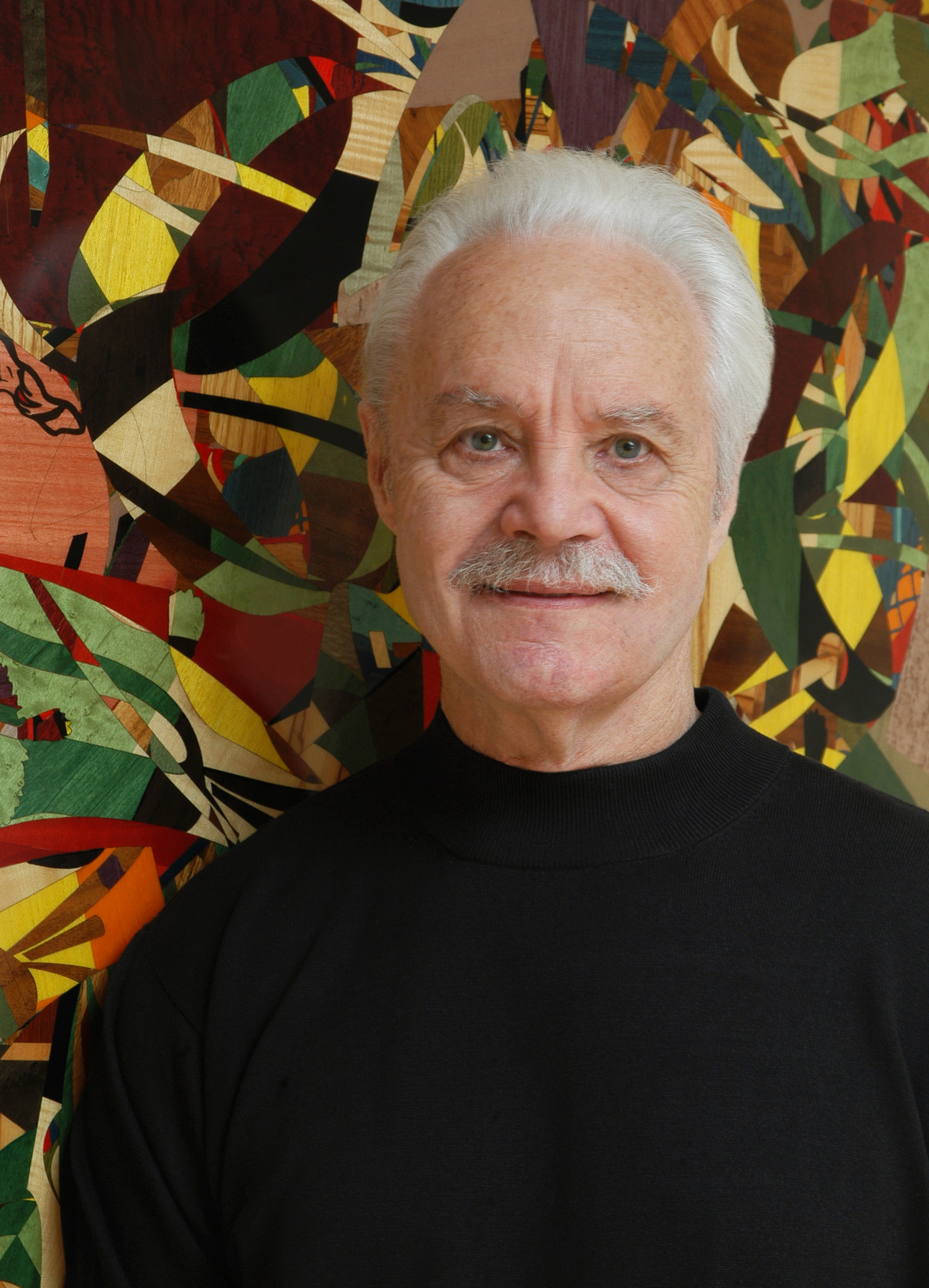
- William Tunberg with a marquetry sculpture
- Born: August 15, 1936 (age 89); Los Angeles
- Education: University of Southern California, 1963, BA Architecture University of Southern California, 1965, MFA Sculpture
- Occupation: Fine Artist
- Known for: Marquetry, sculpture, drawing, assemblage

William Tunberg (born August 15, 1936, in Los Angeles, California) is an American artist specializing in marquetry, sculpture, drawing and assemblage (art). He lives and works in Venice, California.

== Early life ==
Tunberg was born in Los Angeles on August 15, 1936, to a family of writers. His father, also named William, was a movie, radio, television and short story writer, writing such films and television series as Old Yeller, Savage Sam, Garden of Evil, War Paint, Voyage to the Bottom of the Sea, The Wild Wild West, and The Monroes. Tunberg's uncle, Karl Tunberg, was a prolific screenplay writer, his most notable work being Ben-Hur.

Tunberg obtained college scholarships and fellowships from the University of Idaho, University of the South (Sewanee), and University of Southern California (USC), where he received his Bachelor of Arts in architecture in 1963 and his Master of Fine Arts in sculpture in 1965. In 1964, Tunberg won the USC Stanley Jameson Award for most promising artist. In 1965, Tunberg won the First Award, Graphics, Professional for his "Wintergarden IX" drawing in the All California Art in Cross-Section Exhibit, juried by George D. Culler, Director of the San Francisco Museum of Art, and Kenneth Donahue, deputy director of the Los Angeles County Museum of Art.

After graduating from USC in 1965, Tunberg established his studio in Venice, California.

== Career ==
During the 1960s, Tunberg focused on drawing and assemblage. Influenced by Cliff Westerman, Joseph Cornell and Ed Kienholz, Tunberg saw assemblage as the natural three-dimensional extension of surrealism. Using wood, metals, fiberglass, cast plaster, carvings of body parts and found objects, Tunberg encased his narratives in acrylic boxes. Tunberg's assemblage Neoclassical Drawing Trap was selected for inclusion in the Annual of American Sculpture by the Whitney Museum and featured in Time and Esquire.

In 1977, Tunberg was a recipient of the California Arts Commission Award, "Eyes and Ears Foundation Grant", to design and produce art to be exhibited on a 48-by-16-foot (14.6 m × 4.9 m) billboard. Tunberg's Pat Tap was exhibited on Sunset Boulevard in Hollywood, California and referred to in the book Megamurals & Supergraphics: Big Art. During the 1970s, Tunberg's assemblages were encased in boxes painted in high gloss metal-flake, to invite the viewer into the inner workings and tough narratives of his artwork.

During the 1980s, Tunberg began creating furniture and doors. His furniture is made of exotic hardwoods and inlays and his doors are covered in marquetry cut from wood veneer. In 1987, the 72 Market Street Oyster Bar and Grill in Venice commissioned Tunberg to create an inlaid sculptural railing that spanned the entire interior of the restaurant. In 1989, the Maple Drive Restaurant in Beverly Hills commissioned Tunberg to create 52 one-of-a-kind inlaid sculptural tables and booths and a combination marquetry piano/room dividing screen. As a result of Tunberg's work for Maple Drive, he was awarded the 1990 Annual Design Award, Furniture Designer of the Year, by Angeles magazine.

In 1991, Tunberg won the Veteran's Memorial Competition of the City of Santa Monica for his memorial design Promises Kept, which was to be installed in Palisades Park. The design consisted of a locked and barred door surrounded by a fence; a window set in the door contained an eternal flame. Tunberg stated that "I want people to see the monument, and say, 'Whoa, that is heavy!' . . . My idea was to express my true feelings, an honest assessment of what the veteran has done for the country." Selected by a city-appointed panel of three jurors from a field of eleven proposals, Tunberg's design was reproduced as a model and placed on public display. Juror Woods Davy, a sculptor, described the proposal as being the one "that had the most feeling to it', and fellow juror Thomas Rhoads, director of the Santa Monica Museum of Art, regarded it as "the most interesting and . . . thought-provoking of all the proposals". Described by former City Councilwoman Christine Reed as "that jail-door thing", the design caused a political firestorm in the Santa Monica City Council, despite support from panelists and after much uproar, the memorial was abandoned. 1993 brought Tunberg's first religious commission. Bel Air Church in Los Angeles commissioned a 16-foot (4.9 m) inlaid hardwood cross. When the 1994 Northridge earthquake occurred, the Los Angeles Times reported "The 300-pound cross, barely anchored to the floor, did not topple, nor was it touched by the water, though everything around it was ruined." In 1996, The Presbyterian Great Vision Church in Los Angeles commissioned an 18-foot (5.5 m) inlaid hardwood cross. In 1999, Wilshire Boulevard Temple, Irmas Campus, Los Angeles, commissioned a sculptural Ark of the Covenant made of hardwood and marquetry.

In 2001, Tunberg covered the interior of Roy's Hawaiian Restaurant in Rancho Bernardo, California with marquetry sculptures. In 2003, General Dynamics commissioned two 21-foot (6.4 m) marquetry sculptures to span the VIP sections of two sister ships, Midnight Sun and North Star. In 2004–2005, Tunberg was commissioned by Chapman University in Orange, California to work with architect David C. Martin to create sculpture and furniture for Chapman's new Fish Interfaith Center. Tunberg created the altar, lectern, and founders' chairs for the main worship space; the communion table, lectern, and a multi-faith 7-foot (2.1 m) standard with interchangeable tops for Christian, Jewish, and Islamic faiths; and sculpture and furniture for its executive offices. In 2008, Chapman University commissioned an Ark of the Covenant to house a Holocaust Torah that was hidden from the Nazis and smuggled to safety during World War II. Chapman University and the Orange County Register described Tunberg as "...one of the world's foremost woodworking and marquetry artists." Also in 2008, the University of California, Riverside, commissioned a 30-by-10-foot (9.1 m × 3.0 m) sculptural wall for its new Alumni Center.

Sculpture and furniture commissions since 2010 include four interactive hardwood sculptures for Chapman University's Student Union, and sculptural marquetry showcases for an 1854 antique Bible and an 1833 Book of Mormon.

Tunberg has exhibited drawings and sculpture at the Whitney Museum, Los Angeles County Museum of Art, Orange County Museum of Art, Santa Monica Museum of Art, Portland Art Museum, Bishop Museum, and Craft and Folk Art Museum. Tunberg has exhibited at Marlborough Chelsea, University of Southern California University of California, Santa Barbara, UCLA Wight Gallery, University of California, Berkeley, California College of the Arts, American Jewish University, University of Redlands, Caltech, Pasadena, Otis, Los Angeles Institute of Contemporary Art, and Robert Berman Gallery. Works by Tunberg are in the collections of the Los Angeles County Museum of Art, Asher Collection, and São Paulo Museum of Modern Art.
