= Alfred Harrison =

English explorer

Alfred Henry Harrison (1865 – August 1933) was an English explorer.

== Early life ==
He was born in 1865 to Daniel Alfred Harrison, of Chase Hill, Enfield Town, and Mary Jane Hardcastle Burder in Islington, Middlesex. He was educated at Stonyhurst College. His father was the eldest son of Daniel Harrison J.P. of Enfield, and his mother daughter of Henry Hardcastle Burder, of Hatcham Park, Surrey. In 1847 Daniel Harrison of Chase Hill was recorded as a director of the Enfield railway.

Harrison's father died while saving his son, in the collision of SS Cheerful with HMS Hecla off Cornwall, north of the Longships, which took place in 1885. The captain of the Hecla was the explorer Albert Hastings Markham, then commanding the training school HMS Vernon; the subsequent court-martial decided that the crew of Hecla were not guilty of the collision. When Harrison came of age in 1886, he sold much of his grandfather's property to which he was heir.

Harrison's first expedition was to the Canadian Rockies, in 1889. It was followed by a second expedition to the same place a few years later. He then travelled to Northern Africa. A subsequent trip was to hunt, to Slave Lake in Canada. He was elected to the Royal Geographical Society on 22 February 1904.

== British Exploring Expedition, 1905–1907 ==
Harrison returned to Canada for the British Exploring Expedition. This was a private venture with the intention, if possible, of reaching the North Pole, in 1905. Hubert Darrell acted as guide; he had guided a previous expedition led by David Hanbury. Ultimately Harrison fell out with Darrell, and the two parted ways.

Harrison's route to the Canadian West Arctic began at Quebec, from where he made his way to Edmonton, by rail and being joined by Darrell. They went up the trail to Athabasca Landing, by wagon. They reached the Great Slave Lake by river, and their scow was towed across it by a steamer. Then in the Northwest Territories they went down the Mackenzie River toward the ocean, to the Arctic Red River, reached in October 1905.

While Harrison made trips to Fort McPherson, the dissatisfied Darrell set off during one of his absences. Harrison then took Herschel Island as a base for exploration in the Beaufort Sea. He put much effort into mapping the Mackenzie delta, in particular the Husky Lakes area, where he wintered. He did not refer to the previous explorations, of James Richardson and the Comte de Sainville.

Harrison's exploration was cut short when a family member became ill, and he left Canada in 1907. In 1909, he argued for a polar sledge expedition, taking the Jeannette Expedition of an earlier generation as illustration of the limitations of ship navigation in the Arctic.

== Works ==
- In Search of a Polar Continent, 1905–1907 (1908)

Harrison spent 18 months living with the Inuit during this trip, and his book contains information about their customs. It also contains his survey of the Mackenzie delta, with inset maps of Baillie Island and Herschel Island.

One review noted Harrison's thwarted plan to get to Banks Island on a whaler, travel west on sea ice, and explore new ground.

== Family ==
Harrison married in 1890 Josephine Waterton, daughter of Edmund Waterton and his wife Josephine Rock. After his death, she married in 1934 Charles Adrian Joseph Langdale.
