= Alitash National Park =

National park in Amhara Region, Ethiopia

- IUCN category II (national park)
- Location within Ethiopia
- Location: North Gondar Zone, Amhara Region, Ethiopia
- Coordinates: 12°13′20″N 35°28′10″E
- Area: 2,665.7 km^{2} (1,029.2 sq mi)
- Established: 2006
- Governing body: Ethiopian Wildlife Conservation Authority

Alitash National Park, also called Alatish or Alatash National Park, is a national park in North Gondar Zone, Amhara Region, Ethiopia. It is adjacent to Sudan's Dinder National Park. The national park was founded in 2006. It derives its name from the Alatash River that has its source in the park and flows to Sudan.

== Geography ==
Alatish National Park is located 1080 km northwest of Addis Ababa. It covers an area of 266,570 ha composed of lowland woodlands. The landscape is flat with elevation ranging from 520 meters to 920 meters above sea level. The area of the park contains mountainous river valleys, open grasslands, deciduous woodlands, and scattered hills along with seasonal rivers. The Twin Mountains of Amadog are a special feature in the southwestern corner of the park. The woodlands of Alatish National Park became a suitable habitat for multiple species of birds.

== Wildlife ==
=== Flora ===
Alitash National Park encompasses seasonal wetlands, riverine ecosystems, wooded grasslands, and diverse woodlands.

=== Fauna ===
Alitash National Park hosts 37 mammal species including African elephant, leopard, greater kudu and lesser kudu. Seven species of reptiles include Egyptian cobra, black mamba, Nile monitor and rock python are found within the ecosystem.

In 2016, a population of about 200 lions was discovered in the protected area that is thought to be of Central African origin.

The 204 bird species present in Alitash National Park include parrots, eagles, plovers, herons, egrets, ibises, buzzards, vultures and cormorants, which are widespread in seasonal woodland areas.
