= William Tunberg (screenwriter) =

American screenwriter

William Tunberg was an American screenwriter.

He wrote the screenplay for Old Yeller and That's My Baby!. His son, Karl Alexander, was a writer too. His brother, Karl Tunberg, wrote the screenplay for Ben-Hur—and worked on a number of films himself.
