= History of Banbury =

History of the town in England

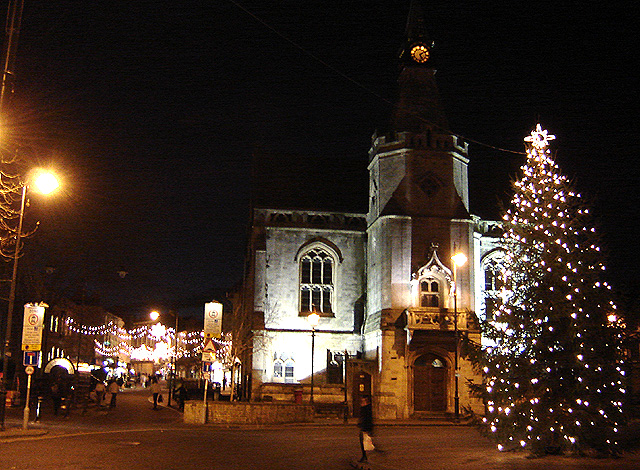
The Town Hall in December 2005

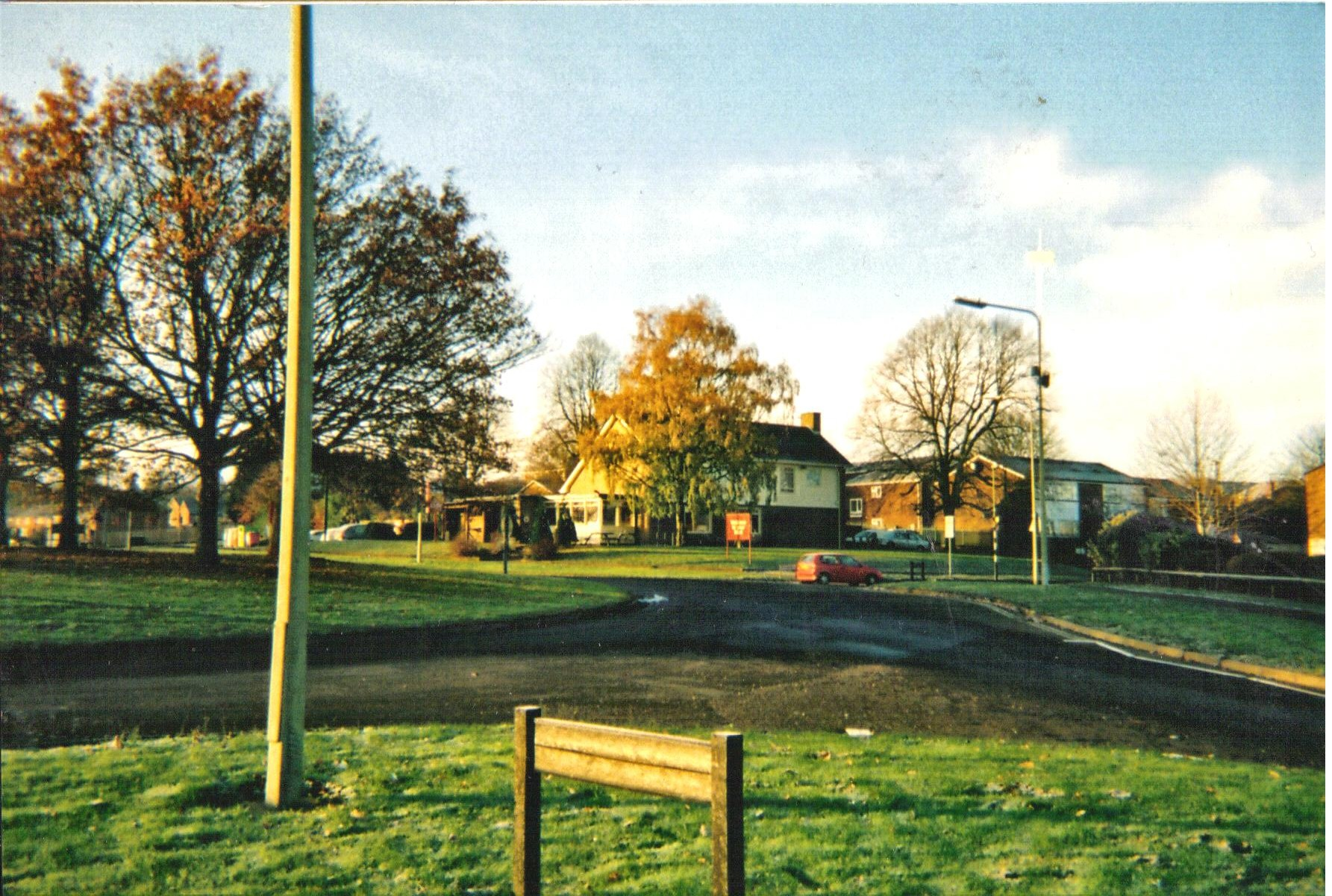
The Admiral Holland Pub in Neithrop, Banbury in 2010. The pub is named after Vice-Admiral Lancelot Holland

Banbury is a circa 1,500-year-old market town and civil parish on the River Cherwell in the Cherwell District of Oxfordshire, England. It is 64 miles (103 km) northwest of London, 38 miles (61 km) southeast of Birmingham, 27 miles (43 km) south of Coventry and 21 miles (34 km) north northwest of the county town of Oxford.

== General history ==
=== Origin of the toponym ===
The toponym "Banbury" derives from "Banna", a Saxon chieftain said to have built a stockade there in the 6th century, and "burgh" meaning settlement. One Saxon spelling was Banesbyrig. The name appears as Banesberie in the Domesday Book of 1086. Another known Medieval spelling was 'Banesebury'

The derivation of the name of the Grimsbury, now part of Banbury, is of early Saxon type, and is the corruption of word for a defended enclosure (burh) belonging to a personage called 'Grim', thought to be a reference to a masked persona of the god Woden.

=== Roman and Anglo-Saxon history ===
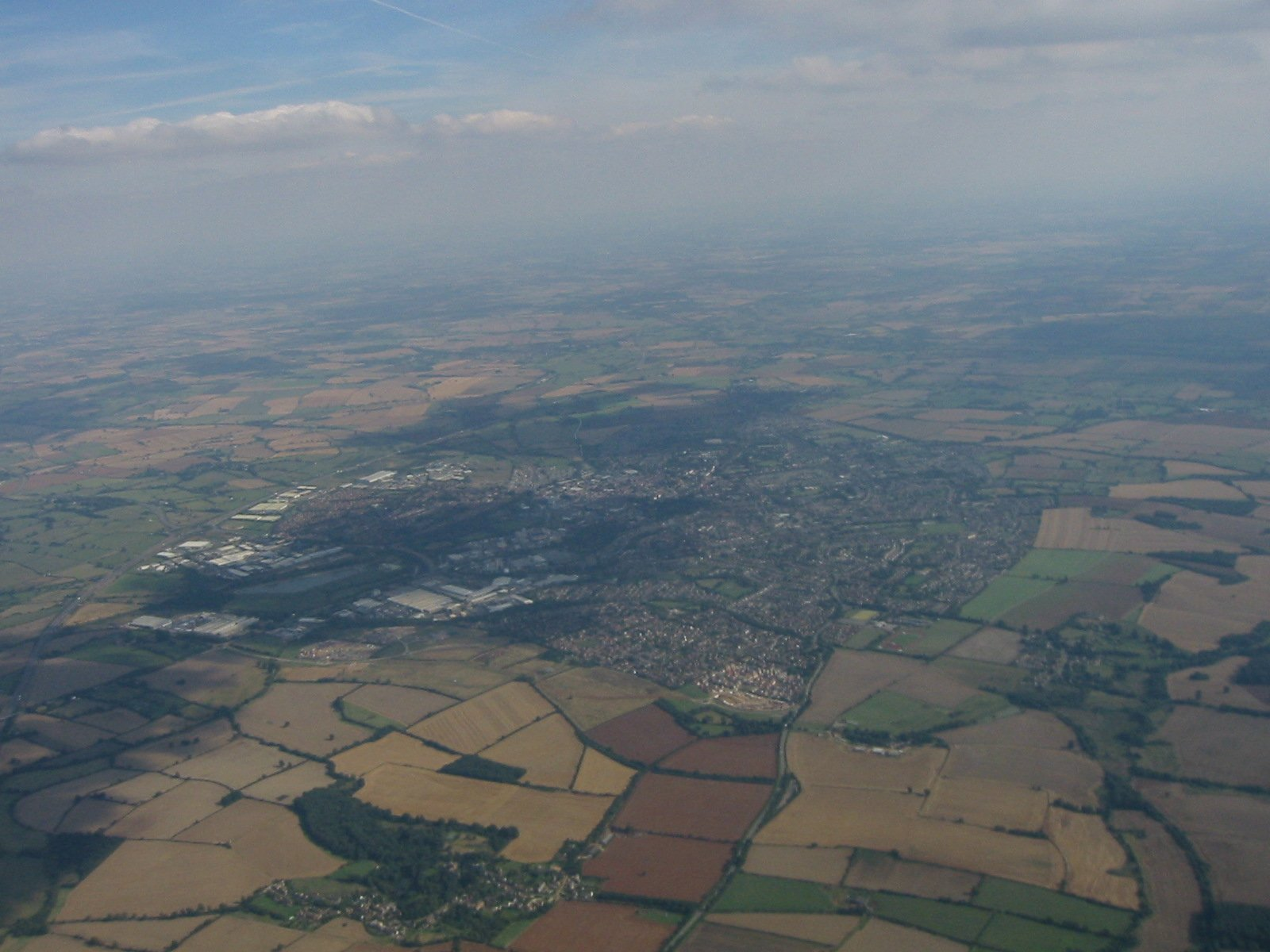
Banbury from the north-west.

Banbury stands at the junction of two ancient roads: Salt Way (used as a bridle path to the west and south of the town), its primary use being the local transportation of salt; and Banbury Lane, which began near Northampton and is closely followed by the modern road. It continued through what is now Banbury High Street and onwards to the Fosse Way at Stow-on-the-Wold. The earliest settlement at Banbury was in the British Iron Age. The remains of a settlement with circular buildings dating back to 200 BC were found in 2002 during excavations for the foundations of a building in Hennef Way. The site contained around 150 pieces of pottery and stone.

Later there was a Roman villa at nearby Wykham Park.

The area was settled by the Saxons around the late 5th century AD. Banbury developed in the Anglo-Saxon era under Danish influence, which started in the late 8th century AD. It was assessed at 50 hides in the Domesday Book of 1086, and was then held by the Bishop of Lincoln.

The Saxons built Banbury on the west bank of the River Cherwell. On the opposite bank they built Grimsbury, which was part of Northamptonshire but was incorporated into Banbury in 1889. Neithrop was one of the oldest areas in Banbury, having first been recorded as a hamlet in the 13th century. It was formally incorporated into the borough of Banbury in 1889.

=== Middle Ages ===
Banbury's medieval prosperity was based on wool.

The manors of Banbury and Cropredy existed by 1086 and probably included all those places known to be in the hundred in 1279: Banbury, Cropredy, Hardwick, Great Bourton, Little Bourton, Neithrop, Calthorpe, Coton, Wardington, Williamscot, Prescote, Claydon, Shutford, Wickham, Swalcliffe, Swalcliffe Lea, Charlbury, Cote, Finstock, Fawler, and Tapwell. Although the extra-parochial district of Clattercote was first included among the vills of Banbury hundred in 1665 and it had formed part of the Bishop of Lincoln's estates and seems to have been included as part of Claydon in 1279. The Bishop was reportedly also interested in several parts of land around Kineton and Bicester in the latter part of the 1270s as well.

The Domesday Book records that in 1086 Drayton had a water mill, probably set on the Sor Brook, on the western boundary of the parish just below the village. There is then a gap of five centuries in which no mill is recorded: but records resume with a mill operating in the parish from 1589 until 1851.

Banbury Castle was built in 1135 by Alexander, Bishop of Lincoln, and survived into the English Civil War, when it was destroyed.

Medieval Banbury was badly hit by the Black Death of 1348–49 as it probably killed half the population of the town, but it quickly grew and had a population of about 1,600 for the next 300 years.

For centuries, trade in wool, ale, cakes and cheese created wealth for the town. Wool was first referred to in 1268, and cheese was manufactured from the 15th to the 18th centuries. By the late 14th century Epwell village, formerly part of Dorchester hundred, began to be included in Banbury hundred. The Abbots of Eynsham early acquired many of the land rights in Charlbury formerly belonging to the Bishops of Lincoln, including by the year 1363 a 3 weeks' court and a portmoot. The payment of 3s, 4d. were payable to the town's hundred bailiff recorded in both 1372 and 1373, which was perhaps made in connexion with the view of a frankpledge, at which the constable of Banbury had to be present as well as the abbot's steward for the hundred.

In 1247 the hundred of Banbury was valued at £5 (100 shillings) a year and in 1441 certainty money due from the northern part of the hundred was 89s. 8d It was made up of payments from Shutford, Claydon, Swalcliffe, Great Bouton and Little Bourton, Prescote, Hardwick, Calthorpe and Neithrop, Wickham, Wardington, Williamscot, Swalcliffe Lea, and the former prebend of Banbury, and 69s. 4d. in 1652, when the total profits of court were valued at 103s. 4d. a year in certainty money. In 1875 payments were made only by Williamscot, Swalcliffe, Prescote, Great and Little Bourton, Neithrop, Claydon, and Shutford since the rest had been freed from their rent obligations.

The Bishop of Lincoln's extensive Banbury estate, excepting Neithrop and Calthorpe, was sold to the Duke of Somerset in 1547, but by 1550 he granted it, excepting Hardwick to John Dudley, Earl of Warwick, then to the Duke of Northumberland shortly afterwards, who in turn granted it to the Crown in 1551 in exchange for other lands.

Long before enclosure, the tenants of Neithrop had become freeholders, as recorded in the land deeds of 1583 to 1608 and 1614, with the permission of both Sir Anthony Cope and his son Sir William Cope.

In about 1629 Sir William Cope, 2nd Baronet. sold a large area of land at Drayton to William Fiennes, 1st Viscount Saye and Sele of Broughton Castle. By 1790 this property belonged to Francis North, 1st Earl of Guilford of Wroxton Abbey. In 1935 and 1942 the Norths then sold their lands at Drayton to Trinity College, Oxford.

=== English Civil War ===
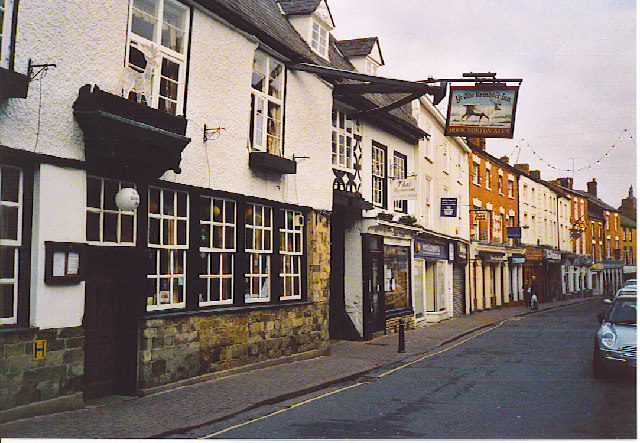
The Ye Olde Reindeer Inn, Banbury, built in 1570 according to the Banbury Museum.

Banbury was partially destroyed by a fire in 1628. It played an important part in the English Civil War as an operational base for Oliver Cromwell, who is reputed to have planned the Battle of Edge Hill in the back room of an inn, then The Reindeer and now Ye Olde Reine Deer Inn. The town was pro-Parliamentarian, but the castle was manned by a Royalist garrison. In 1645 Parliamentary troops were billeted in nearby Hanwell village for nine weeks and villagers petitioned the Warwickshire Committee of Accounts to pay for feeding them.

The Civil War helped develop Banbury's industry. Kings Sutton was a local centre for saltpetre digging, and the Royalist garrison was at work early in 1645 quarrying it there and making it into gunpowder in a specially built house near Banbury. Just over 10 years previously a government saltpetreman had operated at Banbury for a year, having moved there from the then small market town of Coventry, before moving on to Hook Norton a short while afterwards.

The Civil War and the short two sieges noticeably damaged town's prosperity. Two members of the Vivers family and two fellow Banburians petitioned Parliament for an official redress compensation in 1646 and 1647. They claimed the principal looter was a captain in the King's garrison at Banbury Castle. Another self-proclaimed sufferer was the mercer Edward Russell, who after nearly being executed for trying to suborn the Royalist officers to turn Parliamentarian was jailed for three months in 1644. He also claimed his shop and house were looted and destroyed by the castle's Royalist garrison The garrison was soon defeated and the castle partly demolished using gunpowder. The Parliamentarian forces appeared to have also used the River Cherwell for access to Banbury at one point and briefly set up camp in the location of the present day Canalside trading estate, next to the public gallows. In 1649 dissaffected soldiers of the New Model Army mutinied. Being a mutiny and in Banbury, it became known as the Banbury mutiny. The mutineers did not achieve all of their aims and some of the leaders were executed on 17 May 1649.

=== 1660–1834 ===
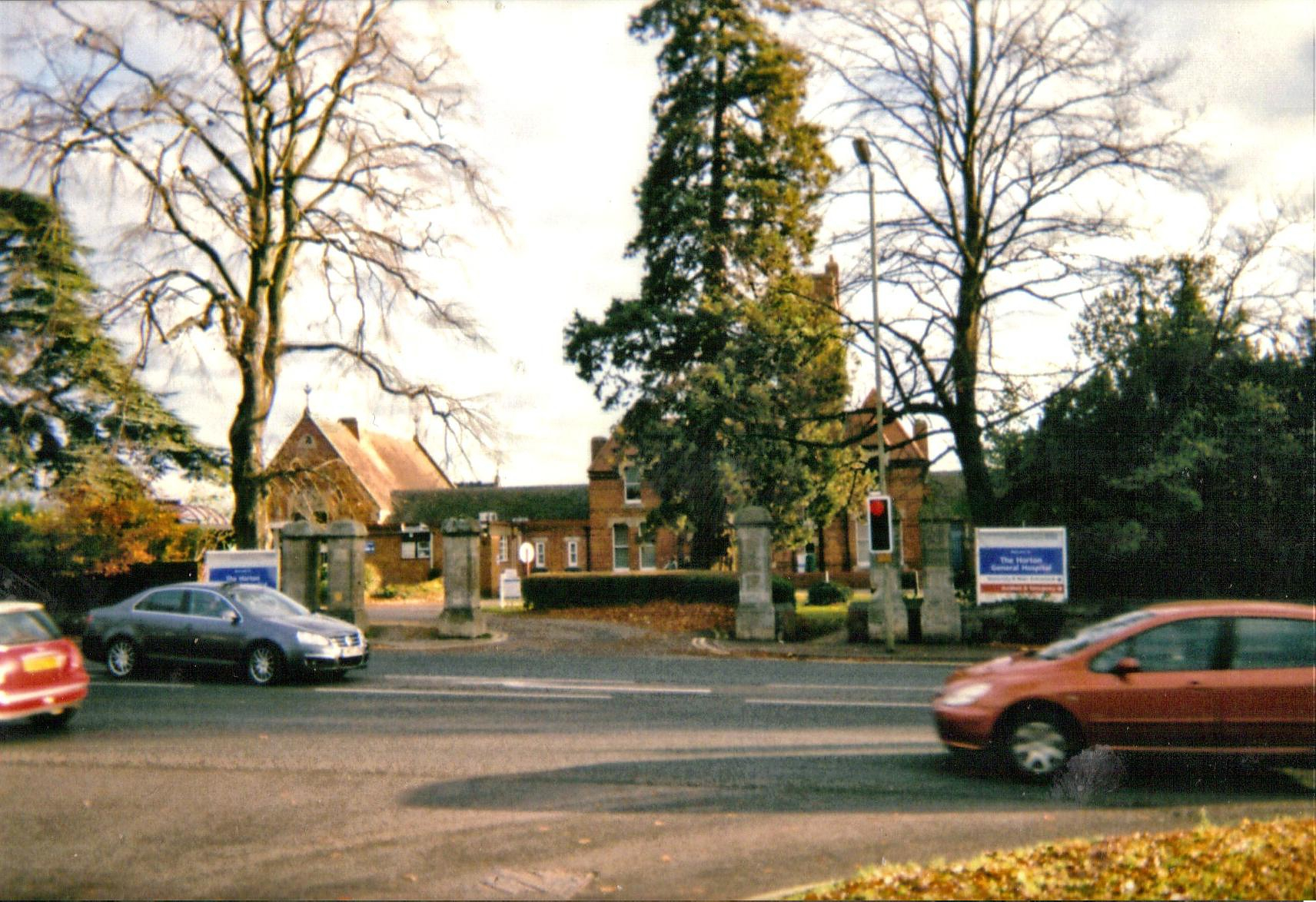
The Horton General Hospital in Banbury, during 2010. It opened in 1872. It was expanded extensively in the 1950s and 1960s. It was nearly down graded in 2017.

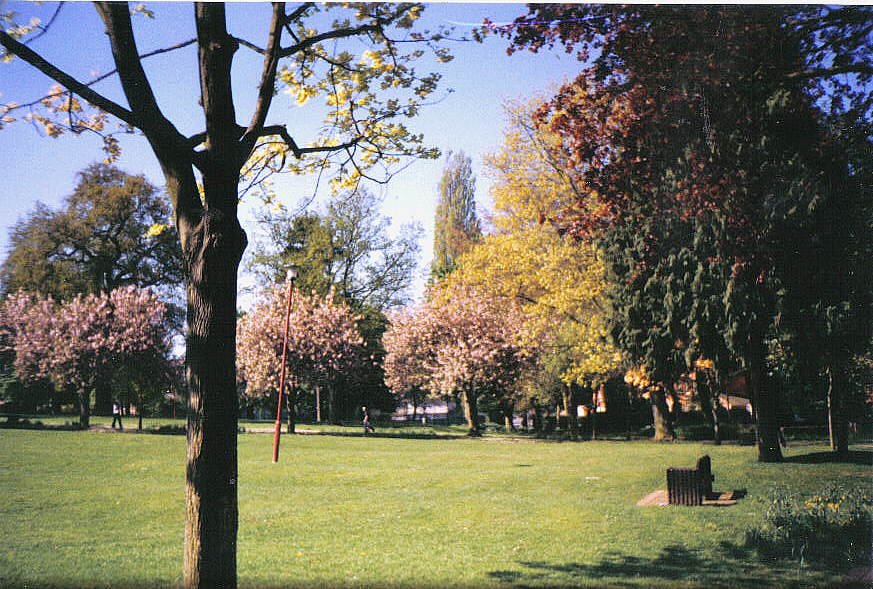
People's Park in 2001.

Quaker missionaries had been active in the Banbury area in the Commonwealth period of the 1650s, and after the Restoration of the Stuart monarchy one Edward Vivers bought land in Banbury in 1664 to build a Friends' Meeting House. This was replaced with a Georgian building in Horsefair in 1751, to which a Tuscan porch was added in about 1820. Several Quaker communities in and around Banbury were recorded in the Visitation Returns of Thomas Secker, Bishop of Oxford in 1738.

Villagers farmed the parish on a two-field open field system until 1768, when Sir Charles Cope, 2nd Baronet bought out the rights of copyholders, life- and leaseholders and enclosed the common lands.

The opening of the Oxford Canal from Hawkesbury Junction to Banbury on 30 March 1778 gave the town a cheap and reliable supply of Warwickshire coal. In 1787 the Oxford Canal was extended southwards, finally opening to Oxford on 1 January 1790. The canal's main boat yard was the original outlay of today's Tooley's Boatyard.

Before the arrival of the Oxford Canal in 1779, the Canalside area was undeveloped, low-lying water meadows. The canal was then extended to Oxford by Banbury's engineer, John Barnes in 1790. Both Parker's Wharf and Bridge Wharf were serviced by fly-boats to many distant cross country destinations and by market boats to Oxford and Coventry. The canal brought much growth and prosperity to Banbury over the years and is still popular with boat users today. The canal's main boat yard is now the listed site today's Tooley's Boatyard.

The Cobb family may have obtained The hundred of Banbury when they bought the land site of Banbury castle in 1792 and in 1853 Edward Cobb was lord of the hundreds of Banbury and Bloxham.

The council objected to the planting of trees in Horse Fair Road, and in 1826 John Walford was then accused of injuring trees planted by the town's commissioners which he considered, like the trees they were planting, to be a waste of money. The commissioners were heckled as a rioting mob destroyed all the trees and fences.

In the nineteenth century John Golby Rusher was a successful publisher based in Banbury, particularly known for his books of nursery rhymes which were distributed nationally. His father William Rusher was a bookseller and stationer and his uncle Philip Rusher, the manager of the town's Old Bank, had promoted Rusher's Patent Types, a redesign of the alphabet to save money in printing.

=== 1835–1912 ===
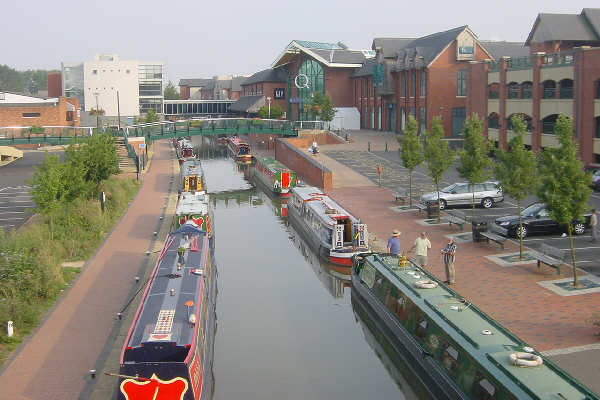
The modern Castle Quay Shopping Centre alongside the Oxford Canal, with Banbury Museum in the background.

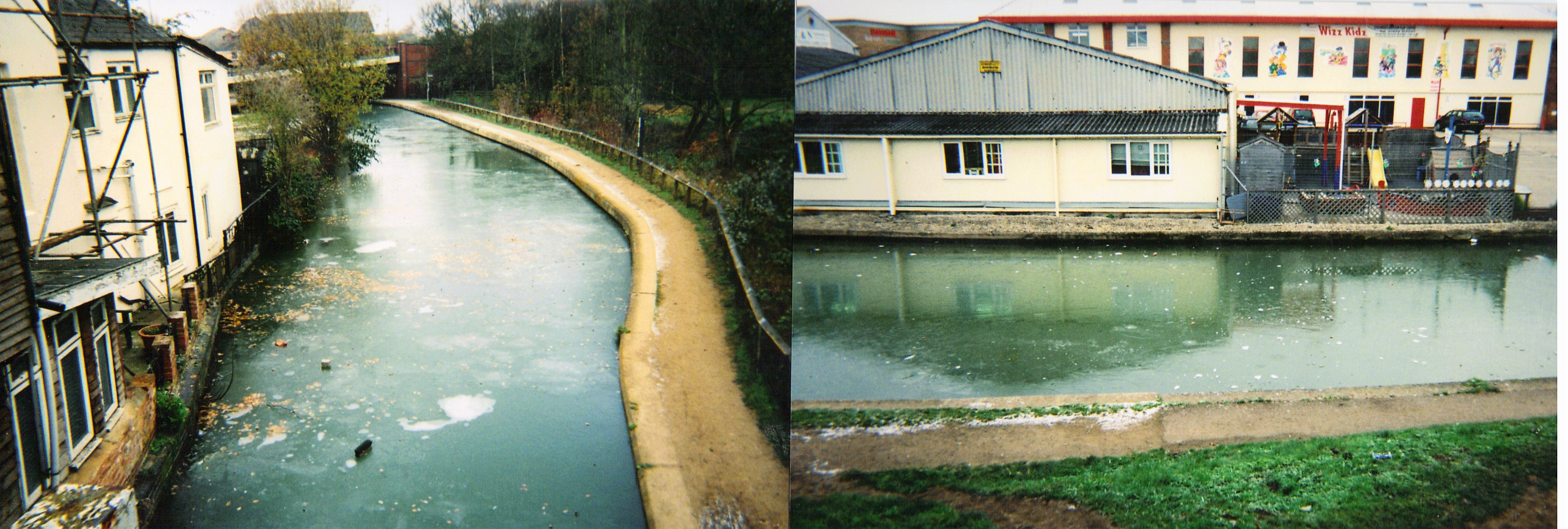
The Oxford canal, frozen on 30 November 2010.

The Banbury Poor Law Union formed 3 April 1835 and a workhouse was built in Neithrop.

In 1836 by the town council took over the running of Banbury and the right to erect gas-works was relinquished in 1833 to the Banbury Gas Light and Coke Company.

In 1838, the Catholic St John the Evangelist Church was built in Banbury. In 1839, the presbytery and chancel was added to it. They were designed by Augustus Pugin. In 1847, the Sisters of Saint Paul of Chartres were invited to create a community in Banbury, St John's Priory. They later moved to St Paul's Convent in Selly Park.

Banbury Improvement Act 1825
- Act of Parliament
- Parliament of the United Kingdom
- Long title: An Act for paving, cleansing, lighting, watching and otherwise improving the several Streets, Lanes, public Passages and Places, in the Borough of Banbury, in the County of Oxford.
- Citation: 6 Geo. 4. c. cxxx

Dates
- Royal assent: 10 June 1825

Other legislation
- Repealed by: Oxfordshire Act 1985

Status: Repealed

Text of statute as originally enacted

After the Banbury Improvement Act 1825 (6 Geo. 4. c. cxxx) created the Banbury Paving Commissioners one of their first acts of was to appoint a committee to report on the condition of the town's streets. In 1826 the streets were reportedly paved with officially-approved Yorkshire flagging stones at a cost of over £3,000, but by 1840 it was noted that, as 'poor quality' stone had been used, the kerb was considered worthless. Between 1852 and 1888 the Banbury Local Board of Health continued the official supervision of streets, laid out several new roads, and started numbering the houses for identification and postal purposes.

Living conditions had improved greatly in Victorian times with the removal of several poorly built cottages that were deemed to be only 'hovels' and a reduction in childhood ill health in the early 19th century. Many cottages in the district of 'Waterloo', which apparently lay just east of Banbury Bridge to the north of the road, had been transformed after the early 19th century so that by 1841 'Waterloo' was considered one of the better off parts of Grimsbury. Banbury was booming, and Grimsbury's principal expansion occurred between 1852 and 1881, when some 500 houses were built, around Middleton Road, Causeway, Merton Street, Duke Street, and North Street.

In 1889, the hamlets of Grimsbury and Nethercote, Banbury became part of Banbury, before this time they were considered to be part of Warkworth in Northamptonshire, although they were both part of the Banbury parliamentary constituency since 1832.

Banbury's freehold land societies came into existence in the 1840s as part of a new pro-Democracy political movement inspired, organised by Liberal Radicals to effect parliamentary reform. Liberalised Banbury's offshoot was a settlement in New Grimsbury. The hamlet was originally called Freetown in the 1840s. Early in 1851 an audience of 300 attended a rally led by James Taylor of Birmingham lecture in Banbury on freehold land societies. Mr Taylor was a disciple of the Unitarian minister George Dawson, and thus became a vigorous crusader for the working-classes.

The first two railways to reach Banbury opened in 1850. Firstly the Buckinghamshire Railway opened the Banbury to Verney Junction Branch Line from Bletchley on the London and North Western Railway via Buckingham and Brackley to a terminus at Merton Street. Within months the Oxford and Rugby Railway from Oxford on the Great Western Railway via the Cherwell Valley opened a station at Bridge Street. The GWR extended the Oxford and Rugby Railway northwards in 1852. In 1900 the Great Central Railway opened a branch line to Banbury from Culworth Junction on its main line.

Upper and Lower Cherwell Streets and Windsor Street had also been built before 1851 as the town first began to grow. Neithrop expanded further between 1850 and 1881, with new housing providing for the borough council's planned slum clearance from 'Waterloo' in Grimsbury and to deal with the then growing population and for the expanding population. This was followed by the building between Windsor Street and Broad Street so that by 1881 there were some 350 then modern houses in the whole area. The street known as Back Lane began converted into Castle Street West, as Castle Street East was created as part of a slum clearance from central Banbury in 1852.

A Quaker pastor was one of the leading figures in Banbury and set up its first two water treatment works in the 1860s.

In the early 1870s the east side of Regents Place was developed by a William Wilkins between 1852 and 1871.

A large demonstration occurred in Banbury in July 1875 against the Vaccination Act 1874. The demonstration was held to celebrate the release from Northampton Gaol of a man who had been imprisoned for 14 days after refusing to allow his child to be vaccinated. Musical bands and crowds met him at Banbury railway station, and he was presented with a purse of gold.

Duke Street, was located at the edge of Wilkins' (now demolished) brick pit, was developed around 1870. South of the Causeway, the newly designated Merton Street was developed by various speculators between the years of 1873 and 1882. It is worth noting the cramped development of the housing on the Causeway and Merton Street (known locally as the 'Railway Terraces') that built by the Great Western Railway, for the company's workers to use on payment of a rent to the GWR. This can be compared with the then contemporary, but more generous, development of the freehold land estate with its forward looking 'build-to-own' policy and public ethos. Development of site in the area continued into the twentieth century, Avenue Road constructed in 1911 being a case in point. Allotments began to encroached on the mostly closed clay pit by 1923.

Banbury town council also built the houses in King's Road and on the Easington estate at that time. More houses were built for the working population at the south end of Britannia Road and the area to the east between 1881 and 1930, and also in both Old Grimsbury Road and Gibbs Road in Grimsbury, and more up-market houses were built in both the Marlborough Road area and in Bath Road, Kings Road, Park Road, and Queen Street in Neithrop. The mostly late 19th-century suburb of Grimsbury witnessed rapid growth between 1881 and 1930. The former church hall of Christ Church, (now known as Oriel House), the former nonconformist chapel on Gatteridge Street, now the Kingdom Hall and the former Mechanics Institute on Marlborough Road all built in 1884. Part of and the former Mechanics Institute is now divided Banbury Public Library.

In 1891 the local medical officer for Banbury found that 62 cottages were dangerously filthy, 63 had defective drains, and 21 no water supply. By 1900, Banbury had a population of 12,968.

The land that was Peoples' Park had been enclosed in Hanoverian times and was set up as a private park in 1890 and opened in 1910, along with the adjacent bowling green.

The mostly late 19th-century suburb of Grimsbury witnessed rapid growth between 1881 and 1901.

=== 1913–1946 ===
In 1911 many people were living in houses unfit for human habitation. The borough council set up a housing committee which some houses were built in Kings Road. The Banbury Co-operative Society completed 12 houses in 1913 in Hightown Road.

People's Park was opened in 1919.

The Housing, Town Planning, &c. Act 1919 was followed by the building of the Easington housing estate of 361 council houses in what was one of the first slum clearance schemes in the country. By 1930 the town's medical officer reported 131 houses still unfit for habitation. So in 1933 Banbury council opened the Ruscote housing estate of 160 houses. The heavily increased population between 1931 and 1949 was accommodated by the expansion of the town in three main areas, in each of which houses were built both by the town corporation and by private housing companies. Between the Oxford and Bloxham roads about 500 houses were built before 1939 to form the bulk of the suburb of Easington, and in the area of the older village and suburb of Neithrop some 500 houses were built before 1939 both around the earlier houses and further west in new streets on either side of the Warwick Road, a development which was extended to the south-west after 1945.

Broughton Road and the West Bar area were mostly built in 1922, with a few building like the Gothic Villa dating from 1871 and the neighbouring West Bar Surgery GP's practice dating from the early 1960s. A total of 770 council houses were built between 1919 and 1940, and another 2,545 (including Withycombe Drive in 1947) during the period from 1945 to 1967 as the population began to grow significantly. The housing developments were mainly in the western parts of the town between the Warwick and Broughton roads, with others being built on the site of the former brickworks in Grimsbury. About 300 more houses were built after 1945. To the north of Grimsbury Square is the 1945–55 area of 'New Grimsbury' and south of it is the 1901 and earlier old town of 'Old Grimsbury'.

National Filling Factory, Banbury was built in World War I Production of filled shells began in April 1916 and ended in 1924. At height of the war gave employment to 933 men and 548 women, by 1919 they were down to 100 men and 72 women. It was closed in 1927.

A then confidential memorandum was sent to Horace Lester on 18 May 1917, by Captain Snowball with idea that the factory could be used for another manufacturing purpose after the war, like the motor depot at Slough Trading Estate had been listed for.

It was dismantlement years leading up to the Second World War and become a Home Guard ranting zone. Some Luftwaffe bombs dropped behind the Bowling Green in the 1940s since they feared it had been reactivated.

Part of it was cut through by the M40 and some is now the site close to the M40 and exit 11 (Banbury) that has been identified by developer Barwood as an appropriate location for the erection of industrial/distribution buildings.

There was a smaller satellite depot on the Middleton Road, Grimsbury, in Banbury during 1919 and it was reactivated in World War II. Three World War II anti-tank phosphorus grenades were dug up by developers and defused by the army in 2012.

Location of World War II air-raid	Date	Type of air-aid	Deaths	Damage	Sources
The canal lock now at the back of the Castle Quay Shopping Centre	September 1940	2 bombs	The lock keeper narrowly survived, but hiss cockerel died	Minor	
A store hut containing barrels of oil, the gas works and Great Western Railway goods yard railway sidings, workers' mess hall and main down line, 30 feet from the signal box.	3 October 1940	6 bombs	6 railway staff	2 of the 3 gas holders and part of the gas works’ purification plant were destroyed, causing £20,000 worth of damage. The resulting fire burned fiercely for about 2 hours. The oil hut also caught fire, a goods yard siding was destroyed, 1 of the tracks on the down line was cut for 8 hours and the mess hall was destroyed.	
An empty field near the sight of a former WW1 shell filling station, behind the Bowling Green Inn, Overthorpe Rd	"later on in 1940"	5 bombs	0	Minor	
The houses on West Street and some old cottages on the corner of Bath Rd.	"Towards the end of the war"	Strafing with a machine gun	0	Minor	

The Northern Aluminium Company, later the Aluminium Company of Canada (ALCAN) sheet rolling factory That had been was built to the north of Banbury in 1931 expanded again in the mid 30s to meet increased demand from the aircraft industry. (it employed 4,000 people at its war time peak, many of them women.) 60% of its war time metal came from Banbury, working in conjunction with an aluminium recycling plant near Adderbury which processed metal from crashed English and German air planes.

=== 1947–1970 ===
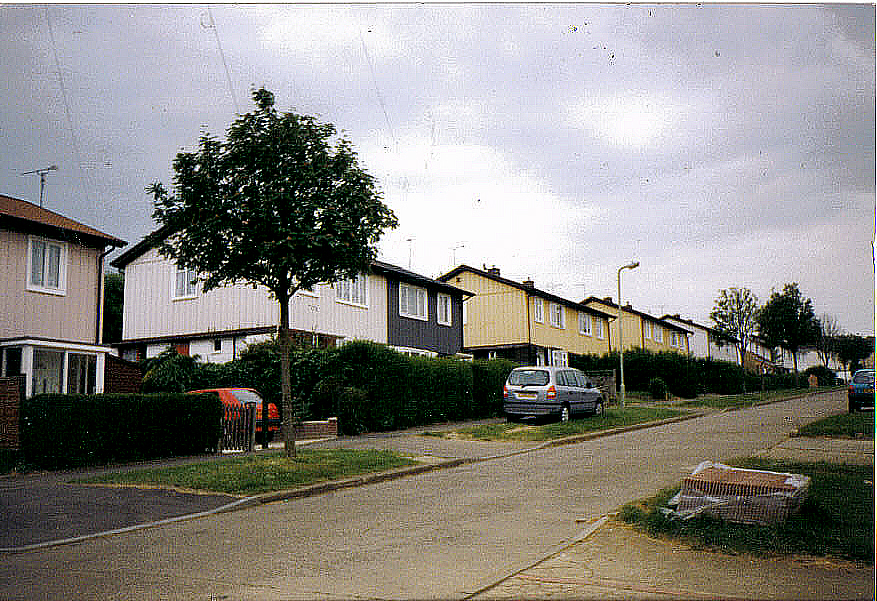
Withycombe Drive in Neithrop. It was built in 1947.

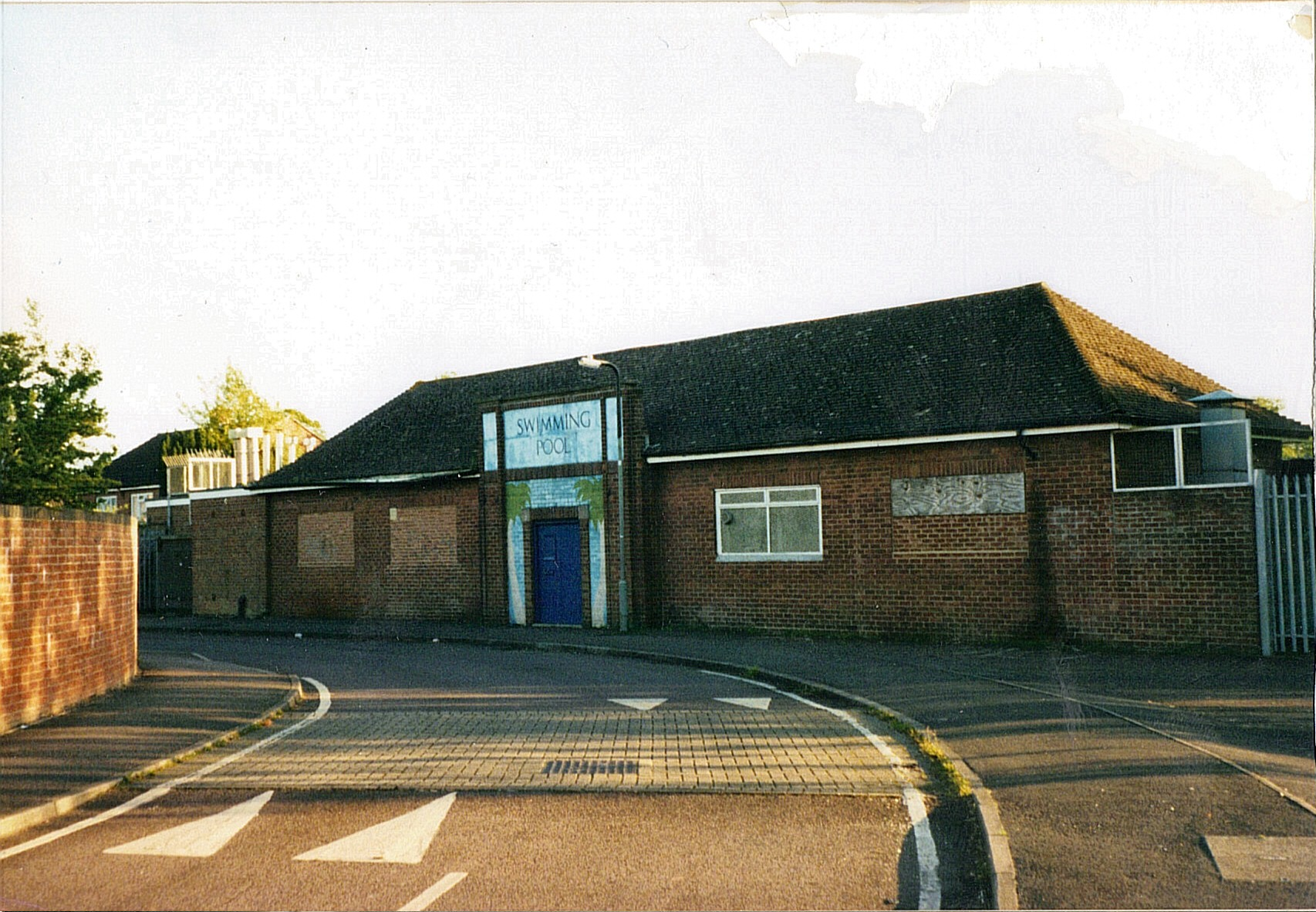
The popular Woodgreen swimming pool in 2004.

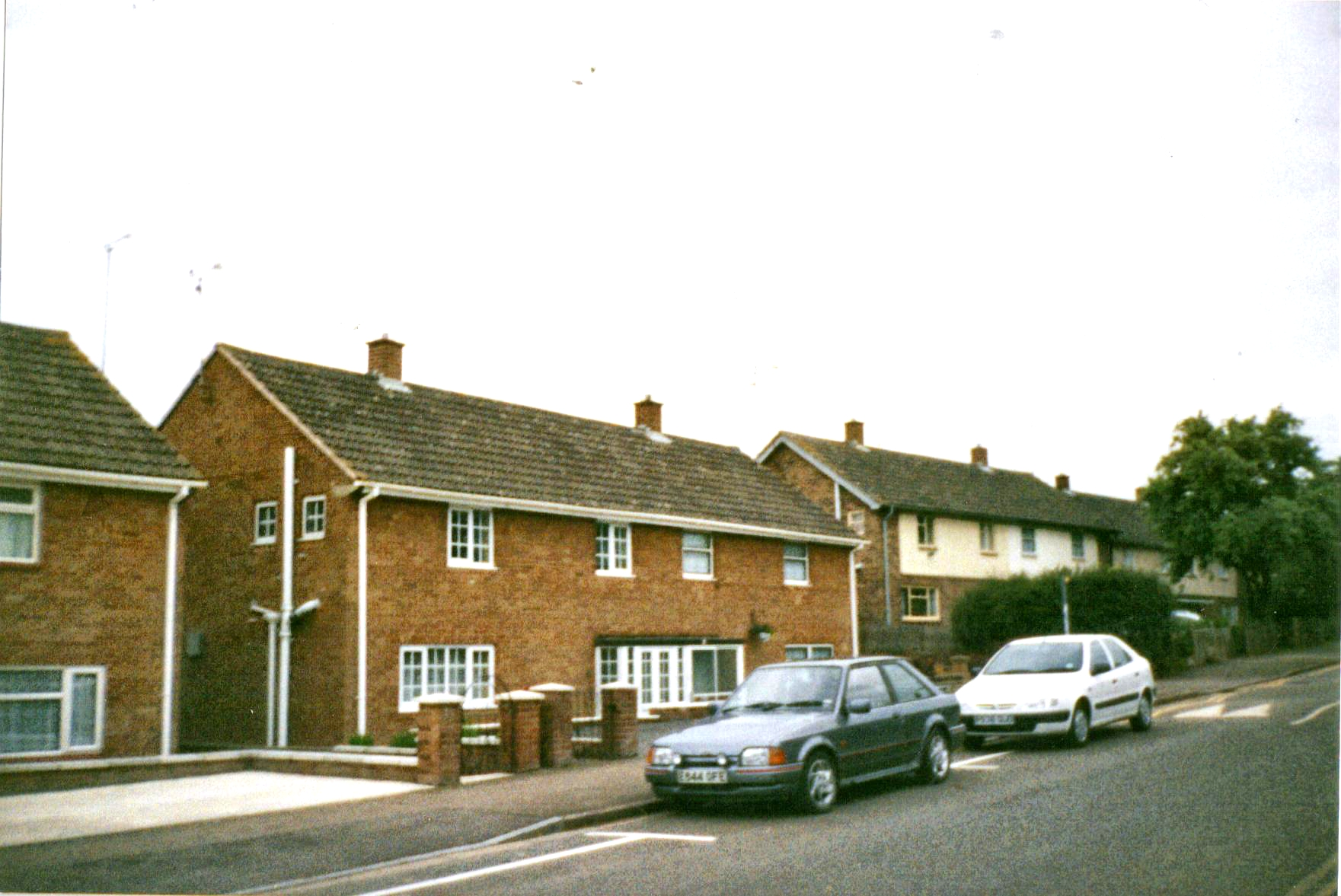
Banbury's Prescott Road and Avenue were built between 1964 and 1965.

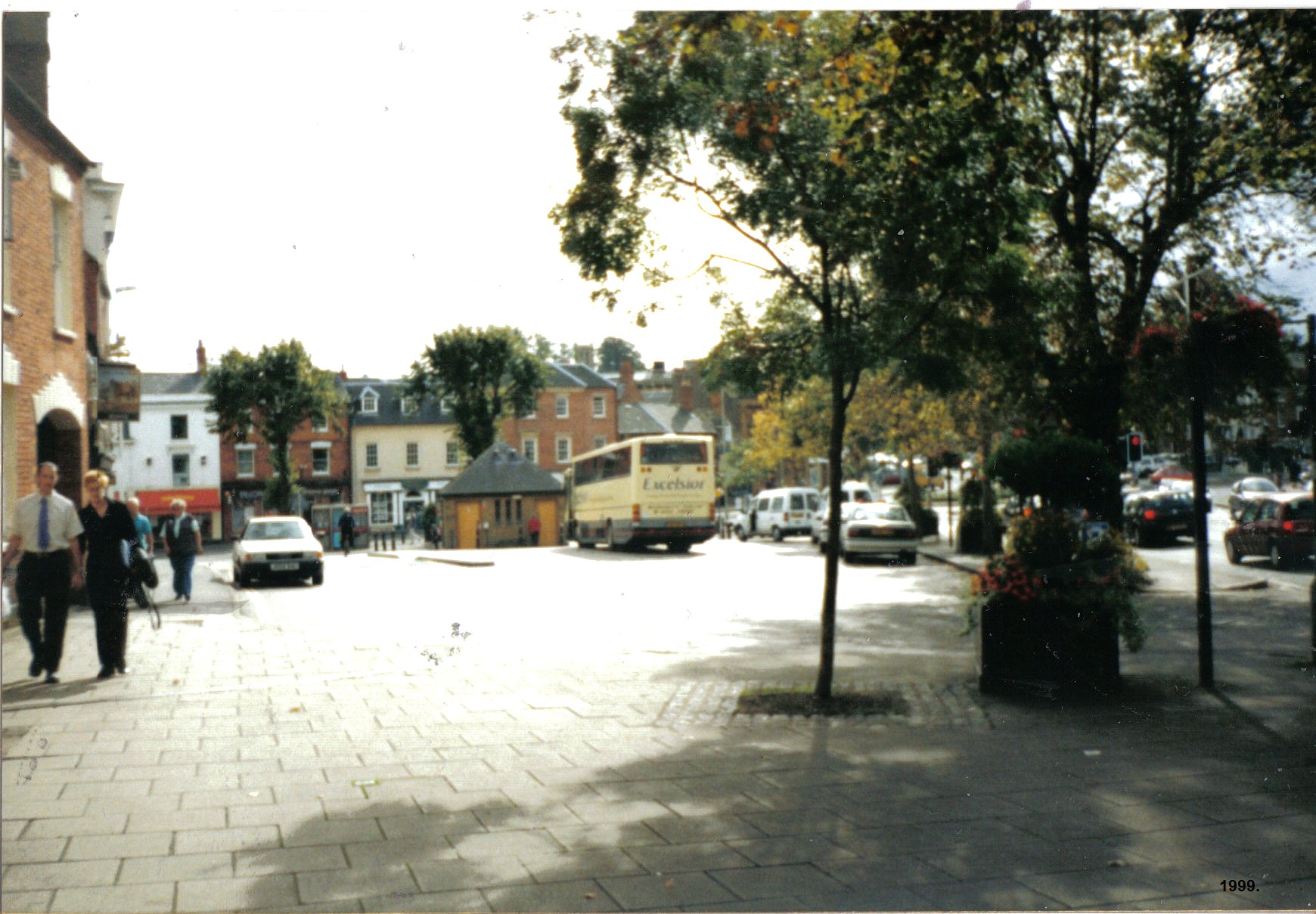
The modern public toilets (the small brick hut) were built as part of the 1981 town renovation project.

The town saw rapid expansion during the 1930s and 1940s as housing was built for newcomers from nearby towns and the emerging London overspill, and another 2,545 (including Withycombe Drive in 1947) during the period from 1945 to 1967 as the population began to grow significantly. The housing developments were mainly in the western parts of the town between the Warwick and Broughton roads, with others being built on the site of the former brickworks in Grimbury. A later expansion between the 1950s and 1970s would reach Hardwick, Ruscote, Easington, Bretch Hill and Poets' Corner, due to influxes from the London overspill and from the West Midlands.

In 1961 a total of 6,504 households were built, mostly in the style of those around Neithrop's Admiral Holland pub. 231 other, older buildings in the town centre still had no indoor toilets, 1,325 had no fixed baths, 1,643 had no hot water taps, and 98 had no cold water tap.

The land south of the Foscote Private Hospital in Calthorpe, Oxfordshire and Easington farm were mostly open farmland until the early 1960s as shown by the Ordnance Survey maps of 1947, 1964, 1955 and 1961. It had only a few farmsteads, the odd house, an allotment field-come-rugby pitch (now under the Sainsbury's store), and the borough council's small reservoir just south of Easington farm and a water spring lay to the south of it. Two minor streams ran from a spring near the allotment gardens and the land under today's Timms estate. An old clay pit, kiln and brick works lay near the Poets' Corner estate. The pit was of mid Victorian origin and the buildings were put up by the issuing of the 1881 O.S. map. The pit had been filled in by the 1920s, the buildings closed by the 1940s and the site was built on by the late 1960s. Bankside road was constructed from 1965 to 1975 in a north to south direction as the local street testifies to.

The Woodgreen swimming pool was opened on 23 May 1939 and renovated in the late 1970s. It was closed in the early 2000s, heavily renovated in 2009 and reopened in 2010. The much frequented outdoor pool is closed from September to March due to the bad seasonal weather.

The Ruscote estate, which now has a notable South Asian community, was expanded in the 1950s because of the growth of the town due to the London overspill and further grew in the mid-1960s.

British Railways closed Merton Street station and the Buckingham to Banbury line to passenger traffic at the end of 1960. Merton Street freight depot continued to handle livestock traffic for Banbury's cattle market until 1966, when this to was discontinued and the railway dismantled. In March 1962 Sir John Betjeman celebrated the line from Culworth Junction in his poem Great Central Railway, Sheffield Victoria to Banbury. British Railways closed this line too in 1966.

=== After 1970 ===
Banbury's growth accelerated after the 1970s with the completion of the M40 motorway which gave faster access to London and Birmingham. By the 1971 census the town's population was 26,540, in 1977 it was 28,520 and by 2001 it had reached 41,802 for the town and 43,867 including the outlying villages such as Drayton. In 2002 an estimate for the town went as far as 46,800 in total. Most of the Hardwick estate built in the 1970s because of the growth of the town due to the Birmingham overspill and a slum clearance scheme in Smethwick. Some Welsh families have moved in since. It was expanded further in the mid-1980s. The main shopping facility is the now partly closed Hardwick arcade. Trinity Close was mostly built between 1973 and 1975, while both New Grimsbury and Bretch Hill continued to grow in the 1980s according to the O.S. street maps of those times.

Trinity Close and Powys Grove they were originally created as separate entities between the late 1960s and early 1980s as the 1973, 1977 and 1983 Ordnance Survey maps help to illustrate. It may be noted that Bretch Hill Road may have remained a long cul-de-sac and not reached the main road if the long planned Banbury by-pass had gone ahead in the 1970s. The housing around Appleby Close was built in the 1970s and might have been replaced by a proposed link between the by-pass and Bretch Hill, if the project had gone ahead. Since then there has been much redevelopment work, with the demolition of the old lock-up garages between 52.065821°N 1.366000°W(approx) Appleby Close and Edinburgh Close making way for a car park and a small housing development.

Banbury used to have Western Europe's largest cattle market, which was on Merton Street in Grimsbury. For many decades, cattle and other farm animals were driven there on the hoof from as far as Scotland to be sold to feed the growing population of London and other towns. Since its closure in June 1998 a new housing development has been built on its site which includes Dashwood Primary School.

The town was renovated in 1981 and partly pedestrianized in 1991. Bretch Hill's Thornbury Drive was put up for sale in 2000. The Hanwell estate, which lies between Banbury and Hanwell, was built in between 2005 and 2006, on the grounds of the former Hanwell Farm, which has become one of the constant houses, due to the natural growth of the town's commuter population.

=== Recent crime and anti-social behaviour ===
There was a 200 strong riot in the Market Place in 1988, which was quickly brought under control by the police.

There have been some concerns over antisocial behaviour and heavier than average litter levels in Princess Diana Park and Hillview Park, and also about fly-tipping in Banbury which affects some streets and footpaths such as on the Ironstones' paths.

17 August 2011 saw only minor scuffles in Banbury as the national riots passed Banbury by.

=== Local redevelopment plans ===
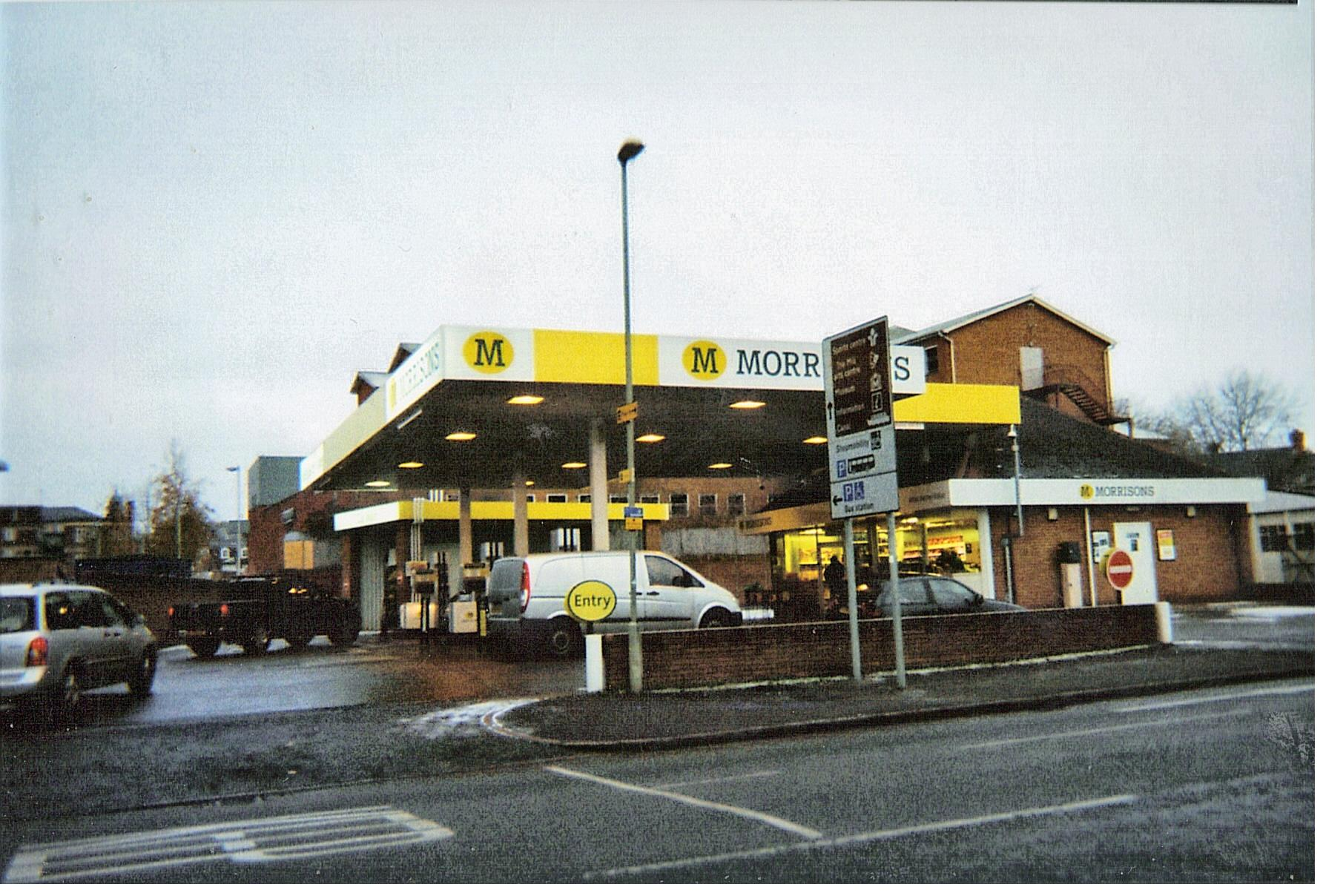
The Morrisons' garage in Banbury in 2010. The tall building to the top right with the fire escape coming out of it is the now redeveloped, long derelict Crest Hotels building.

Woodgreen's 45-year-old youth club was closed in April, 2010, demolished during July 2010, and its replacement is due to open in early 2011. The redevelopment plan was valued at £3 million.

There was a plan in the late 2000s to expand the Bretch Hill estate westwards into local farmland, but this has now been suspended due to the credit crunch and local hostility to the plan, including the southern expansion towards Bodicote.

The Hanwell Fields Estate was built in the north during 2008 and 2009. It was intended to provide affordable social housing to the west and south of Banbury, and more upmarket housing in the Hanwell fields area.

Over the past few years there have been plans to build a new estate on the undeveloped College Fields adjoining both Bodicote and the Cherwell Heights housing estate of Banbury. In February 2006 Cherwell District Council voted to approve the plans despite a 20,000 signature petition against it. About 1,070 houses will be built in the estate, which will include local shops, a public house, a church, a restaurant, a school and other local services.

The former Penryth Road/Appleby Close play-park 52.066235°N 1.366614°W(approx.) was closed and the facilities (a roundabout, bench, bicycle rack and spring rider) were removed in the 1990s due to vandalism. The area may now be redeveloped as a car park.

Castle Quay, a shopping centre in Banbury, is subject to a redevelopment plan. This plan is to increase the size of the centre and add more facilities, such as a cinema. The car parks are in the process of being demolished, one at a time so that shoppers in cars can still place their car in a car park. This process is set to be complete in 2021, but this date may be delayed due to the COVID-19 pandemic.

== Industry and commerce ==
=== Before 1639 ===
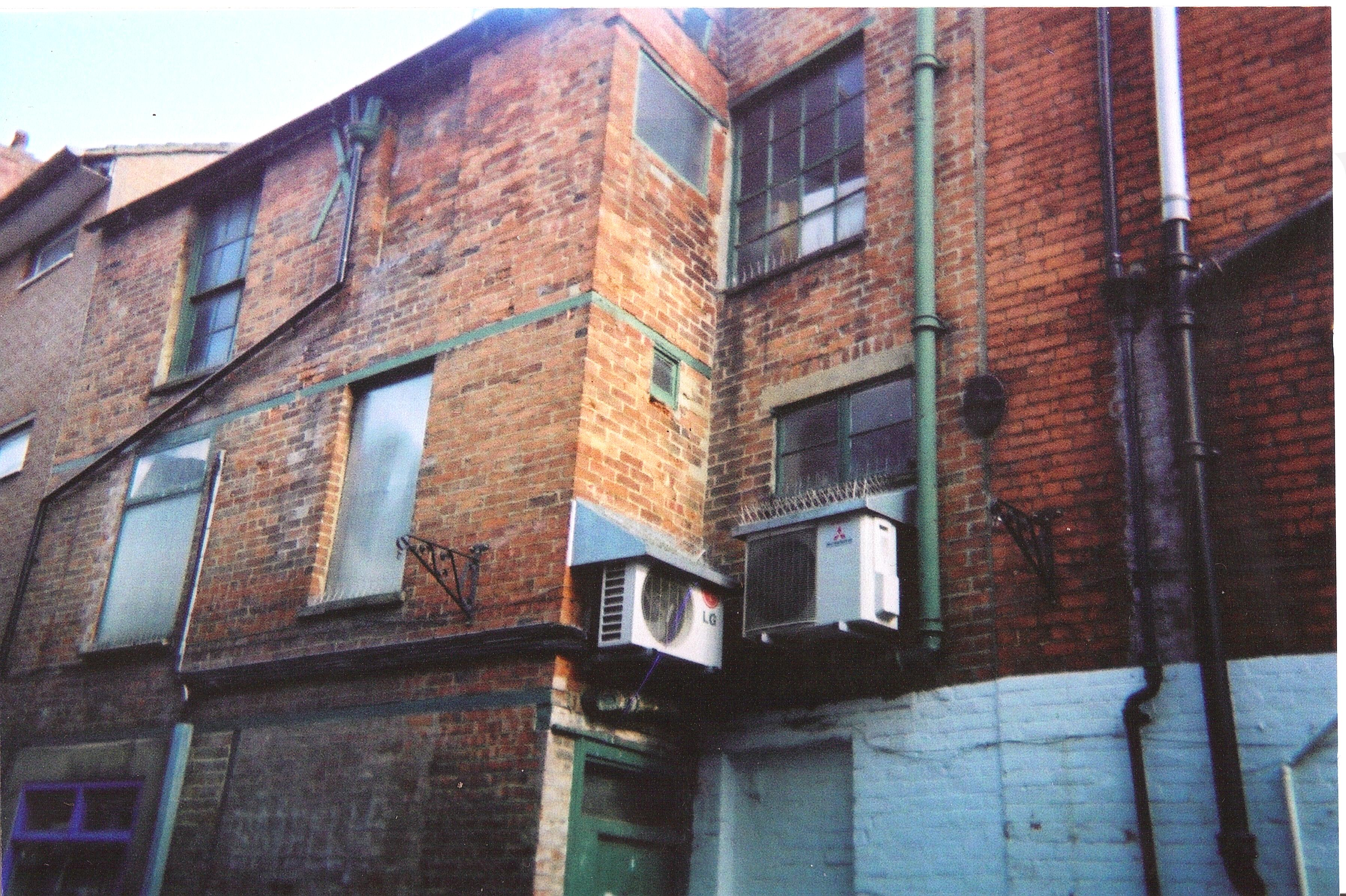
A modern air conditioning unit perched over the doorway in a late Victorian shop building in the town's centre. The town centre is still the home to many small shops and business to this day. The building were upgraded and airconditioned over the intervening years.

The Domesday Book in 1086 listed 3 mills, with a total fiscal value of 45 shillings, on the Bishop of Lincoln's demesne lands, and a fourth which was leased to Robert son of Waukelin by the Bishop. Among Banbury's four Medieval mills was probably a forerunner of Banbury Mill, first referred to by this name in 1695. In the year 1279, Laurence of Hardwick was also paying 3 marks (equivalent to 40 shillings) in annual rent to the Bishop for a mill in the then Hardwick hamlet.

The fore-runners of Butchers Row were probably long standing butchers' stalls which were known to be in situ by 1438.

=== 1639–1870 ===
In 1639, the woollen cloth draper Robert Vivers, who was also lessee of the prebendal estate, owned the Banbury Mill. In 1648 he sold it to Londoners Edward Darnelly, who was apothecary and his friend, the bowyer Thomas Brightwell, and in 1671 Mr Darnelly leased the mill windmill in Easington, for £44 a year to Samuel Bradford, the owner of Moor Mill in Oxford. Banbury's first major printer was John Cheney. He started out in 1765 as the innkeeper of the 'Unicorn' inn by next year he started selling paper as a side-line he had is known to have set up as a jobbing-printer by 1767. A boatbuilding yard was opened in 1790 on the canal at the end of Factory Street and boats were built there until the canal ceased to be used for commercial transport. In the 18th century Banbury New Bank (later the Gillett Bank) had also been Richard Tawney, who was the owner of a major brewery at Oxford. The coming of the railway enhanced Banbury's position as a market town and regional centre. This was the main factor behind the expansion of the New Bank under Joseph Ashby Gillett and his successors. The Cobbs' factory for "weaving, webbing, and horsecloths" was founded around 1700 and continued in production until 1870. In the early 19th century the most successful brewery in Banbury was the one owned by Thomas Hunt's, opened in Bridge Street just before 1847. A blacking factor was also opened by 1832 and it had five employees in 1851, but closed around 1872. The Italianate Elms House on Oxford Road, a substantial villa built in 1863 for Jonathan Gillett, one of the senior partners of Gillett's Bank, is now the offices of the Primary Care Trust, which lies within the grounds of the Horton Hospital site.

The Canalside area began to develop became a centre of Banbury's agricultural, transport, and electrical engineering industry at about the same time as the arrival of the railways in 1850. By the year 1861 the Britannia Works agricultural machinery plant had become by far the largest single enterprise, employing 380 men and boys, and the Vulcan Foundry industrial railway and steam engine works employed between 40 and 50 people. Until the mid-19th century Banbury's trade and industry were based mostly on the products of agriculture and stock raising, with a modest volume of weaving, milling, baking, brewing and boat building.

The agricultural implements and milling equipment works at the Vulcan Foundry, was begun in 1837 by the firm of Lampitt and Co., a local firm that was established two years earlier by a Mr Lampitt. Charles Lampitt produced a mobile steam-engine in 1847, and John Lampitt invented systems of 2-speed gearing and 3-speed gearing for traction engines. Among the products of the works were mobile and fixed industrial steam engines, and a major industrial steam engine which supplied the power for the Hunt Edmunds Brewery for 90 years. Other engineering firms included Barrows and Carmichael, the Cherwell Engineering Works, a local branch of the Mr. Humphris Built Traction Engines in a workshop in North Bar Street.

At the Great Exhibition of 1851 exhibits by firms and individuals from Banbury included the following items and displays:

- A Charles Lampitt horse-seed-driller,
- Britannia Works agricultural machinery,
- An anti-attrition threshing machine,
- Various pharmaceutical preparations,
- A public demonstration of the action of phosphate of lime and magnesia on the soil,
- Inflated saddles,
- Plushes,
- Various mohair, hemp and sackcloth, blacking, mangles with mahogany tables and
- A lady's ornate walnut work-table.

The coming of the local railways made possible the expansion of the approximately 200-year-old agricultural implement manufacturing business in Banbury. The Britannia Works company's site was set up by Sir Bernard Samuelson from the earlier foundry established by James Gardner. Sir Samuelson had obtained a licence to make McCormick reapers by 1851, and by 1859 the firm was producing numerous agricultural machines, including turnip cutters, a patent digging and forking machine, a patent reaping machine, and lawn mowers. The firm also built the now demolished railway viaduct at Hook Norton. By 1881 the production of the company's produce was carried out at two separate works in south-east Banbury, which were linked by a tramway with a depot beside the railway, south of the Great Western Railway's station. Britannia Works was one of the town's major employers until the 1920s.

=== 1869–1964 ===
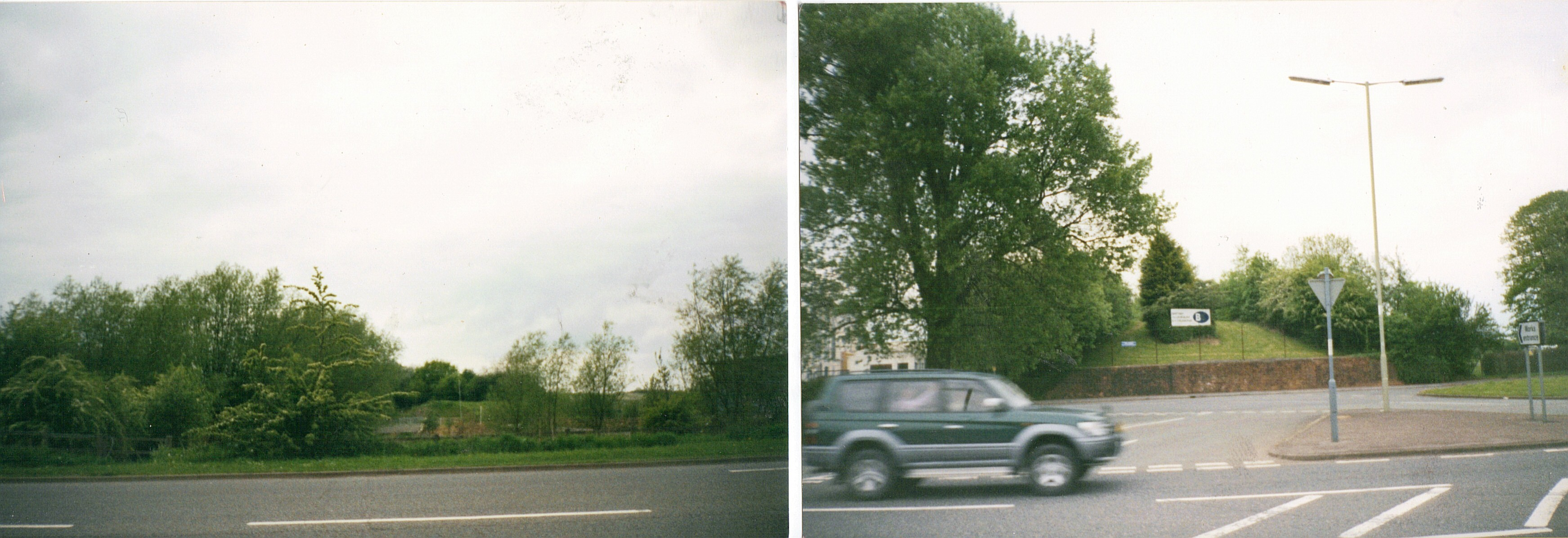
The former OIR bridge supports by the former Alcan works in Banbury.

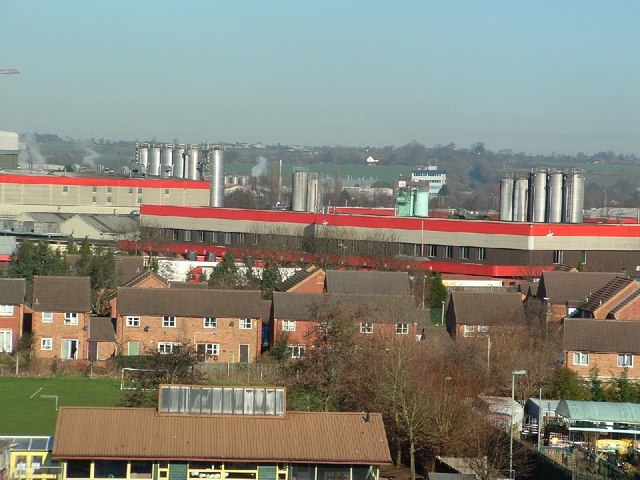
Fine Lady Bakeries behind Coopers Gate, Banbury. The company was started in the 1950s and established on this site since 1965.

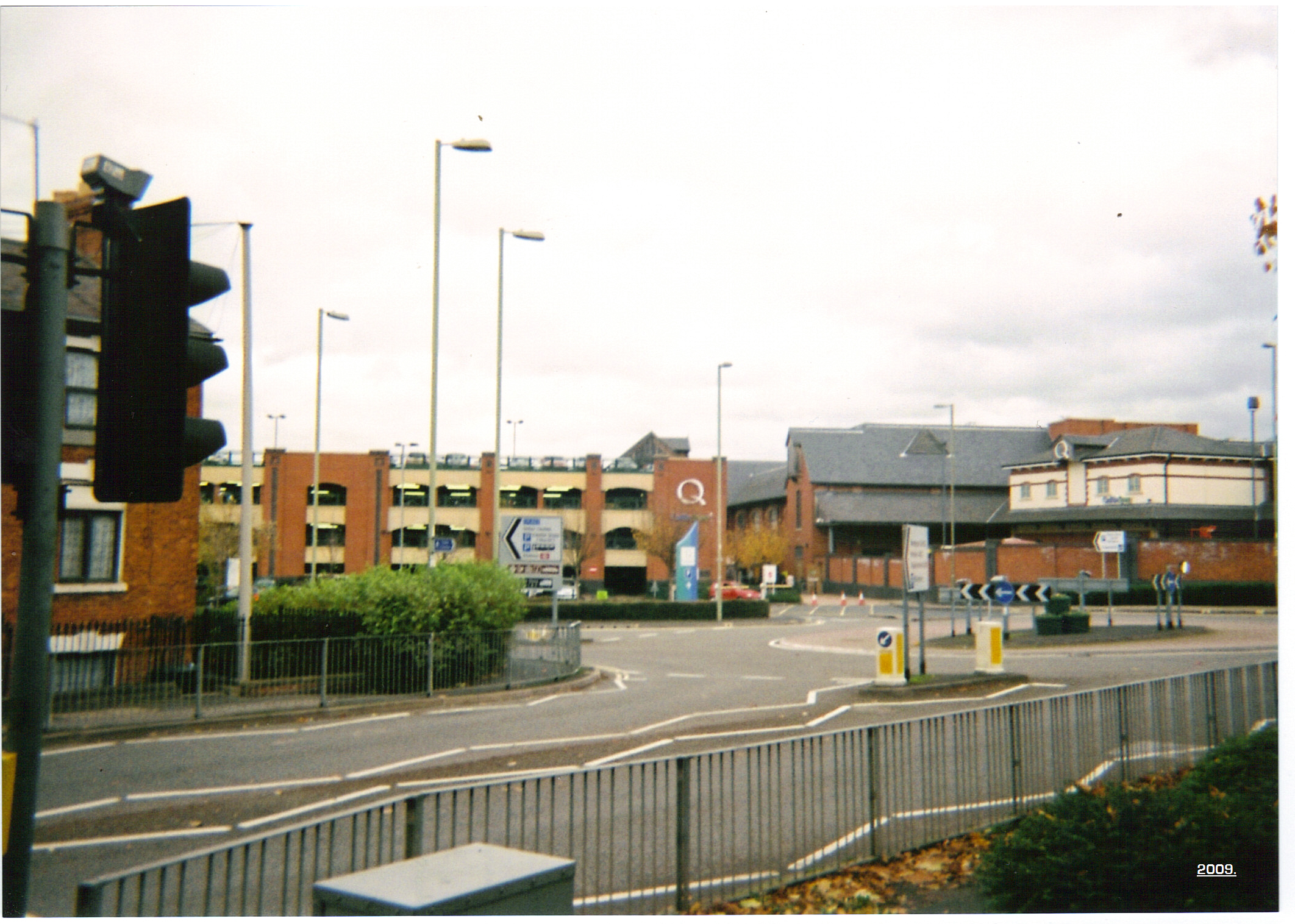
The Castle Quay shopping centre, and car park visible to the left.

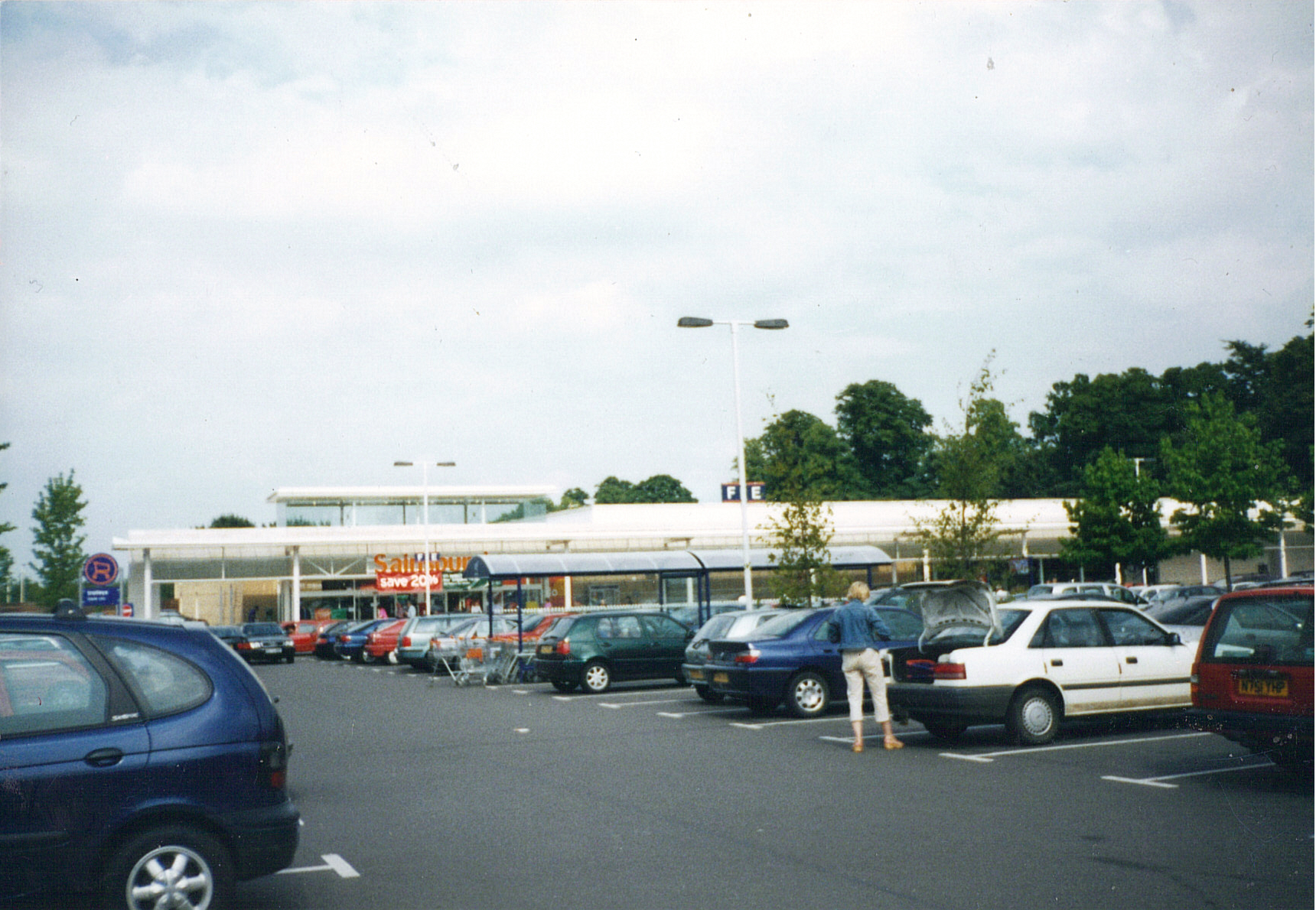
Sainsbury's supermarket in Banbury during 2000. It was enlarged in 2009–2010.

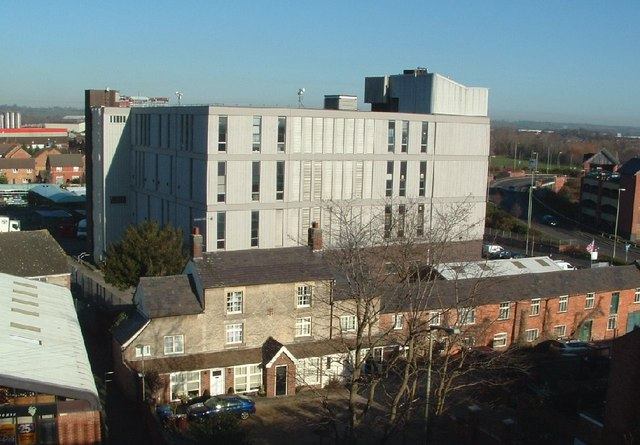
The mid-1970s British Telecom telephone exchange building dwarfs the house and buildings behind Castle Street.

In 1870 Mr. T. R. Cobb sold his web-girth making mill to a company that later became the Banbury Tweed Co. Grain, brewing, wool and cloth were the centuries-old trade of Banbury, but the Banbury Tweed Co. factory finally closed its factory in 1932, bringing an end to an era. The historic background to Banbury's industry began with a few grain merchant's mills and weavers' looms under the Normans and this was continuing in some form until the last tweed factory closed in the 1920s, despite the then new industries like the nearby lime kiln and cabinet manufacture works, Neithrop's timber yard or Grimbury's clay pit and clay kilns.

The economic decline from the 1870s until the 1920s slowed down the rate of urban expansion as the various sawmills, timber yards, flour mills, a tweed factory, a lime kiln and a malthouse all closed. Grimsbury and Neithrop were the centres of the timber trade, while the rest was largely set along the canalside, apart from a few clay pits outside the town.

Duke Street, was located at the western edge of Wilkins' (now demolished) brick pit, was developed around 1870. There was a substantial 'brick, tile and drain works' with a short tramway in it to the east of Grimsbury in the vicinity of Howard Street according to the 1882, 1883 1900, 1910, 1922 1923 and 1947 Ordnance Survey maps. It had closed by 1923 and the last workshops had shut in 1955. It was mostly built on by 1965 according to the 1955 and 1965 O.S. maps.

Co-operative Society built their shop in Broad Street during 1907 and it offices at the Art Deco Banbury Co-operative Building in 1920. They had moved on by 1935.

In 1917 the Oxfordshire Ironstone Railway opened between an iron ore quarry north of Wroxton and a junction on the GWR just north of Banbury. It was heavily used during the Second World War but closed in 1967. Heavy clay and Ironstone deposits surround Banbury.

The growth of Banbury's population had nearly stopped by the 1920s, and people left the town as its market and its economic importance in the district declined: it is recorded that only 9,700 animals were sold there in the whole of 1924, compared with 6,300 at the town's Michaelmas Fair alone in 1832. The town's existing industries were mostly unsuccessful and in steady decline. The Banbury Tweed Co. closed its factory in 1932 and the Britannia Works, which made agricultural machinery, closed in 1933. But in the 1930s the town's economy became more diversified and less closely linked with the surrounding countryside and towns such as Daventry, Bloxham, Bicester and Southam. In 1927 a large factory for corsets and surgical supports (Spencer Corsets Ltd) opened in a disused clothing factory in Britannia Road, and the manufacture of electrical equipment by Switchgear and Equipment Ltd. started in 1932, first in part of the disused machinery Britannia Works; it moved to a newly built factory on the Southam road around 1939. New industries continued to be attracted to Banbury after the Second World War, and in the 1950s the council established the Southam Road Industrial Estate, which attracted a wide range of industrial installations and works to the town. The 60-year-old cabinet works near The Mill centre and the Cherwell Engineering works on the Canalside estate also closed in the late 1950s.

In the late 1920s the economy of Banbury was revolutionised by the arrival of new industries and in particular by the relocation of the out-of-town livestock market to Grimsbury it used to be held in Neithrop and/or Bridge Street, Banbury. The new site was selected due to its proximity to the railway station.

The Northern Aluminium Co. Ltd. or Alcan Industries Ltd. pig and rolled aluminium factory was opened in 1931 on land acquired in 1929 on the east of the Southam road, in the then hamlet of Hardwick. The various Alcan facilities on the 53-acre (21 ha) site closed between 2006 and 2007. The factory was demolished between 2008 and 2009. The laboratory was also closed in 2004 and demolished in 2009.

The Northern Aluminium Company (ALCAN) sheet rolling factory That had been was built to the north of Banbury in 1931 expanded again in the mid-30s to meet increased demand from the aircraft industry. (it employed 4,000 people at its wartime peak, many of them women.) 60% of its wartime metal came from Banbury, working in conjunction with an aluminium recycling plant near Adderbury which processed metal from crashed English and German aeroplanes.

After the Second World War the increasing industrialization of the town led to a great enlargement of the urban area, the chief residential features being extension in the northwest and, north of the Warwick Road, westward between the Warwick Road and Bloxham Road, in the south around the Easington estate and on the west bank of the Oxford canal, principally, the Cherwell Heights. The industrial building has continued on both sides of the Southam road and in the late 1950s the council acquired 86 acres (35 ha) of land on the west side of the road for an Industrial Estate to house the influx of planned new industry.

=== After 1964 ===
Another major employer is General Foods Ltd, now Kraft Foods, which produced convenience foods, including custard and instant coffee. The company moved to Banbury from Birmingham in 1965. Kraft Foods Banbury has become an icon of the town's economic rebirth after the mid-1960s. The Fine Lady Bakeries also opened in the 1950s and expanded its local operations in 1965.

In the central area were built many large shops, a bus station, and a large car park north of Castle Street. In 1969 proposals for the redevelopment of the central area were in hand, leading to the creation of the Castle Quay shopping centre in 1977 and the nearby multi-story car park in 1972. The 1977 plans to build another multi-storey car park on what is now the open air car park behind Matalan and Poundland were scrapped in 1978 and another one was built to the rear of the Castle Quay shopping mail in 1978.

The former Hunt Edmunds brewery premises became Crest Hotels headquarters, but closed in the late 1970s and was abandoned in the late 1980s, while the Crown Hotel and the Foremost Tyres/Excel Exhausts shops found new owners after they closed in 1976 due to falling sales. Hella Headlamps, a vehicle headlamps firm closed its 20-year-old factory on the Beaumont Industrial Estate in the mid-2000s. The local ironmonger, Hoods, opened in the mid-1960s and closed circa 2007, with the shop becoming part of the then enlarged Marks and Spencer shop.

Banbury has several shops in suburban local centres and in the town centre. There is a market held on Thursdays and Saturdays in the market place, as well as a farmers' market on the first Friday of every month.

A shopping centre, Castle Quay, is in the centre of Banbury. It opened as the Castle Shopping Centre in 1977 to cover the former Factory Street, before being expanded over the Castle Garden allotments in the 1990s. The centre has over 80 stores including well-known names such as Marks & Spencer, Bhs, WH Smiths, F. Hinds (jewellers), JJB Sports and Debenhams.

There are many local convenience shops scattered about the town in places like the Ruscote Arcade, Hardwick Arcade and Bradley Arcade.

==== Kraft Foods, Banbury ====
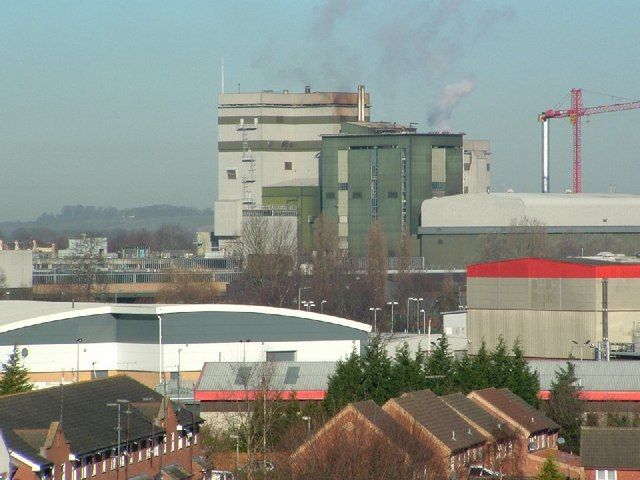
The Kraft Factory. A familiar sight on the skyline of Banbury is steam from the Kraft Factory.

Kraft Foods in the Ruscote ward of Banbury operate a large food and coffee producing factory in the north of the town. It was built in 1964, partly due to the London overspill. The factory is still sometimes known as General Foods after the American company which originally owned the building before it was taken over by Kraft. In October 2006 a building at Kraft Foods that was being prepared for demolition caught fire. There was also a small fire at the coffee plant on 7 December 2010.

=== Industrial estates ===
==== The Tramway and Canalside industrial estates ====
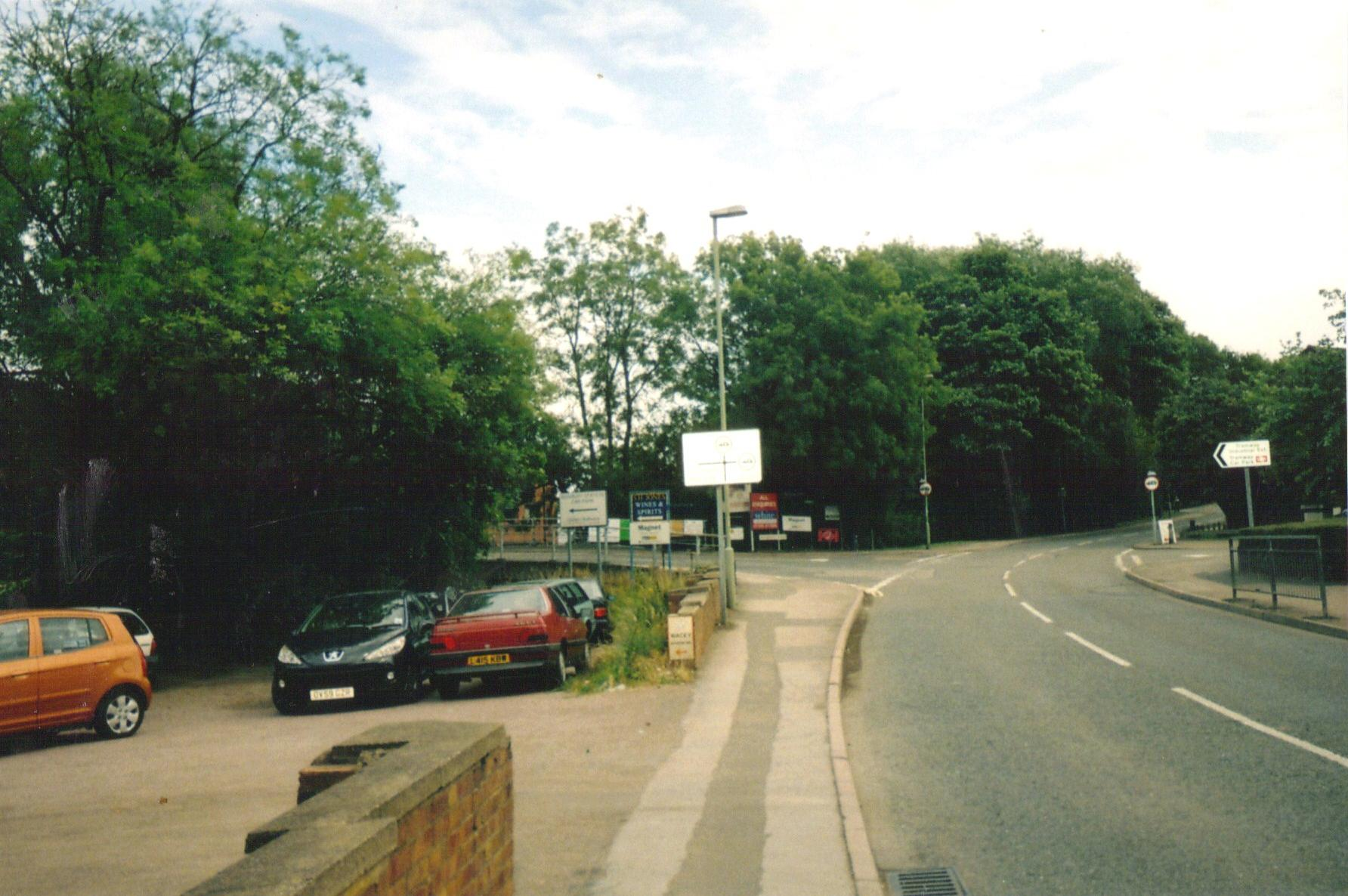
The Tramway Industrial Estate, Banbury in 2010. It was Opened in the 1880s and a tram operated in it until the 1930s. It was redeveloped in the 1990s.

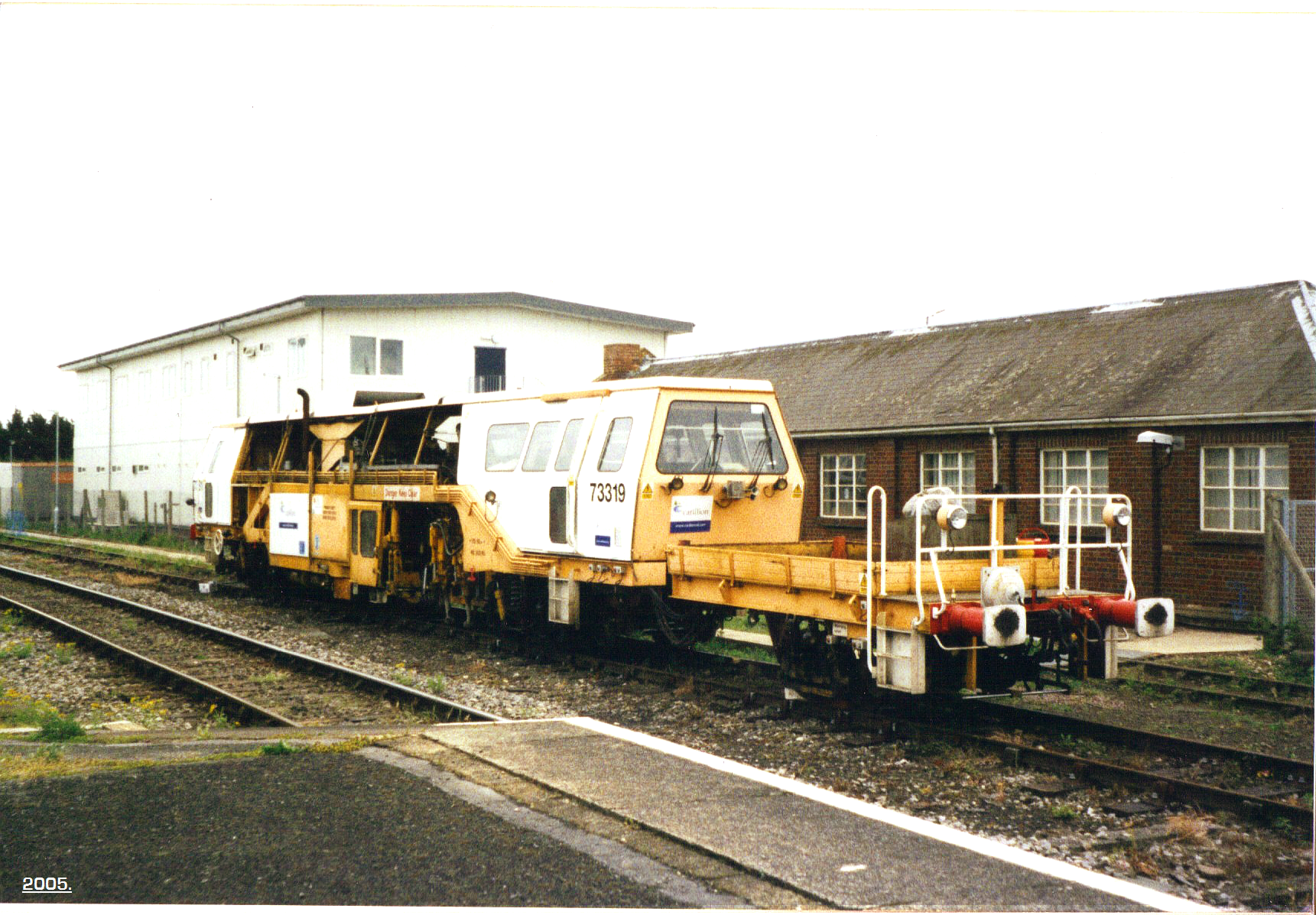
Carillion ballast/track tamper train at Banbury station in the mid-2000s. The red brick work shed behind it is one of the surviving Britannia Works buildings.

The Tramway industrial estate and Canalside estate are mostly built on land once owned by the Britannia Works. The Tramway industrial estate is named after the industrial tramway that ran between factories on Windsor Street, Upper Windsor Street, Canal Street, Tramway Street and the plant next to Banbury station and the station's corporate freight siding between around 1881 and 1935. The estate is now a home to many businesses like the Stagecoach bus depot, a Wacky Wardrobe fancy-dress shop, Magnet Kitchens' show, Teamtalk clothing limited room and a small local oil tanker depot by the station.

==== The other industrial estates ====
The mid-1950s saw the council established the Southam Road Industrial Estate. The estate was successful in bringing a wide range of industrial to the town. The most important newcomer at the time was General Foods Ltd, formerly Alfred Bird & Sons, and now Kraft Foods, which produced convenience' foods, like custard and instant coffee. The company moved to Banbury from Birmingham in 1965 and received active political and fiscal co-operation from the council. A new factory with a floor space 80,000 square feet (7,400 m^{2}) was being constructed in 1969 for Encase Ltd and a factory was being built for Demag Hoists and Cranes Ltd., a subsidiary of Demag Zug, one of the world's largest manufacturers of lifting equipment. The industrial estate had become one of the 'economic epicentres' of the Banbury region by the early 1970s.

The Overthorpe industrial estate was built in the 1960s and 1970s and the Wildmear industrial estate was created in the late 1970s and early 1980s, over the former farm house, small late Victorian local swimming pool and pond as the 1973 and 1983 Ordnance Survey maps show. The Thorpe Way industrial estate, which is next to the long established spittle fields sewerage works, started up in the 1950s and grew further towards the Overthorpe industrial estate (which is named after the nearby village of Overthorpe, Northamptonshire) in the 1960s.

=== Farming ===
Banbury once had Western Europe's largest cattle market, on Merton Street in Grimsbury. The market was a key feature of Victorian life in both the town and countryside. In the late 1920s, the economy of Banbury was revolutionised by the arrival of new industries, in particular by the relocation of the out of town livestock market to Grimsbury It used to be held in Neithrop and/or Bridge Street, but moved to a part of Gimsbury next to Banbury station. The new site selected due to its proximity to the railway station. It was formally closed in June 1998, after being abandoned several years earlier and was replaced with a new housing development and Dashwood Primary School.

The Barber family were local landlords, who let out their Easington estate's lands, examples being Little Wood close was leased to a local man in 1690, the adjacent lands in Berrymoor to another in 1692. The Barber family's property in Easington was thus farmed as a whole by successive tenants until late Victorian times.

The land south of the Foscote Private Hospital in Calthorpe, Oxfordshire and Easington farm were mostly open farmland until the early 1960s as shown by the Ordnance Survey maps of 1964, 1955 and 1947. It had only a few farmsteads, the odd house, an allotment field (which briefly became a rugby ground and is now under the Sainsbury's store), and the borough council's small reservoir just south Easington farm and a water spring lay to the south of it.

Berrymoor farm was finally demolished in circa 2004 after many years of dereliction had made it unsafe to use and became today's St. Mary's View. Much of the farm land was used to build a children's day-care, an industrial storage facility, a small electrical substation, and a branch of De Montfort University (now a branch of the Oxford and Cherwell College) on in the late 1960s.

Bretch Farm, near Claypits close, opened in about 1900, was expanded slightly in 1910, lost a large part of its land to the Bretch hill development (the watertower and communications transmissions mast) in the 1960s, closed in 1990 and has lain derelict ever since.

=== 2008–2010 credit crunch ===
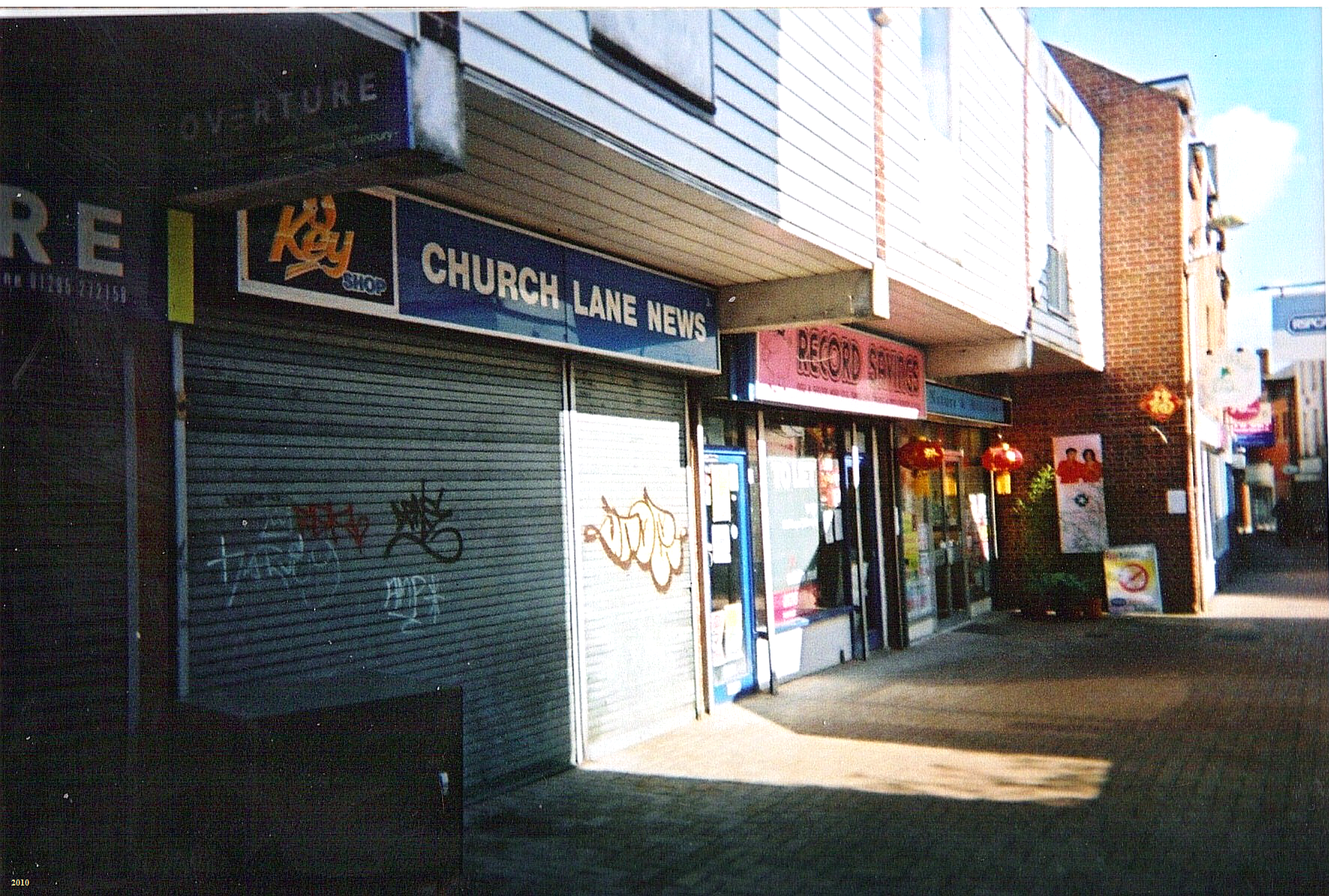
Banbury's historic Church Lane.

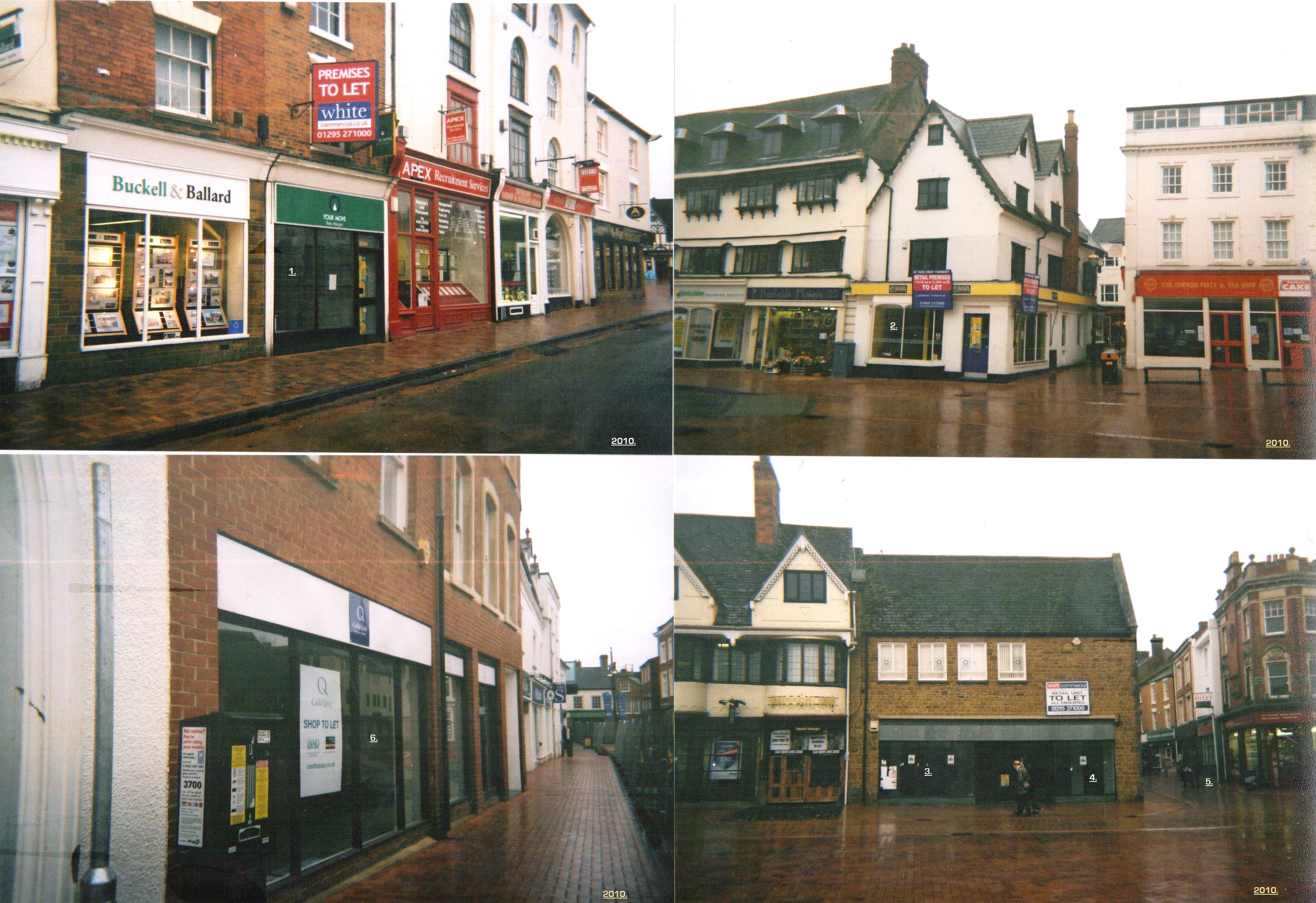
A picture of these closed Banbury shops in 2010. They all closed in 2009, except for Skills Centre, which closed in 2010. The closed shops are- 1/ Your Move estate agents, 2/ Bagel Bite café, 3/ Dolphin Bathrooms,4/ Mobën Kitchens, 5/ Chicken Hut café and 6/ Skills Centre recruiting agency.

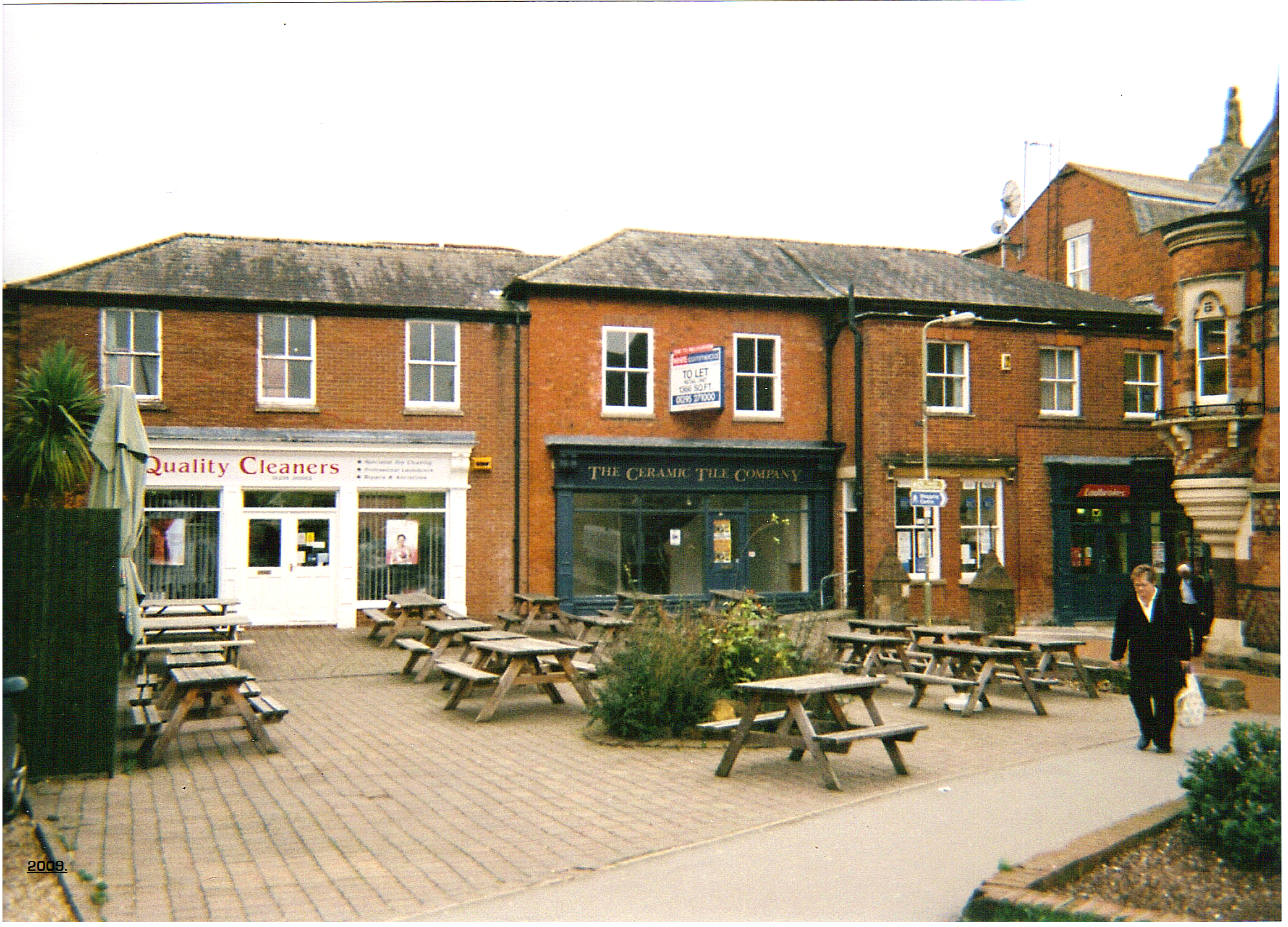
The Ceramic Tile Company shop closed in 2004, and the shop building has not re-opened or been bought since.

The credit crunch and subsequent UK recession has led to unemployment rising sharply (it was only 1% in 2001 and 2002, but rose sharply c. 2007–2008). Several places closed, mostly between 2007 and 2011, but most have subsequently re-opened since.

The Polish delicatessens – Grosik, the various new shops in the Hanwell Fields Housing Estate and a recruitment drive by Prodrive have reduced the unemployment levels over the latter part of 2010 as the local economy began to improve.

=== Mixed fortunes 2012–2015 ===
Arthur Whitcher Menswear, which was founded in 1955, closed in 2015, as did Thee Olde Sweet Shoppe earlier and Jessica's Sweet Shop in 2014.

A site close to the M40 and exit 11 (Banbury) was identified by developer Barwood as an appropriate location for the erection of several industrial/distribution buildings in 2012 and work began in 2014. British Airways, Fast Server and Prodrive have already bought some tenancies.

== Local government ==
Banbury was an ancient parish. The parish historically straddled the boundary between Oxfordshire and Northamptonshire, which followed the River Cherwell. The Oxfordshire part of the parish (west of the river) included the town itself and the hamlets of Neithrop, Calthorpe, Easington, Hardwick, and Wykham. The Northamptonshire part of the parish (east of the river) included the hamlets of Grimsbury and Nethercote.

The town was a seigneurial borough in the Middle Ages, controlled by the Bishop of Lincoln as lord of the manor. In January 1554, Mary I issued a charter which incorporated the town as a borough and also made it a parliamentary borough (constituency). Mary's charter defined a borough boundary matching the parish, but the borough later came to be defined as a much smaller area, just covering the urban area as it then was. Under the 1554 charter, the town was governed by a corporation comprising a bailiff and twelve aldermen, and parliamentary elections were overseen by the High Steward of Banbury. A subsequent charter in 1608 replaced the bailiff with a mayor, with the first known mayor being Thomas Webb.

The borough corporation had a relatively significant role in running the town when first created, but gradually lost functions, particularly during the 18th century. By the early 19th century the corporation's main functions were holding certain courts and running parliamentary elections. As such, a separate body of improvement commissioners was established in 1825 to maintain the streets within the borough.

In 1832, the parliamentary borough was enlarged to cover the whole parish. The borough was reformed to become a municipal borough in 1836 under the Municipal Corporations Act 1835. Whilst the parliamentary borough had been enlarged to cover the whole parish, the municipal borough kept the old boundaries, despite the urban area having grown beyond them in several places. A plan to expand the municipal boundaries was drawn up in 1837, but was not implemented.

The town's improvement commissioners continued to operate alongside the borough corporation until 1852, when the whole parish was made a local board district. The local board took on the functions of the abolished commissioners, and also had powers relating to sewers, public health, and other aspects of local government. The borough corporation and the local board then existed alongside each other, with their differently defined areas and roles, until 1889. The borough corporation was responsible for the administration of justice, police, markets, fairs, trading standards and the upkeep of municipal property within the borough. The local board was responsible for repairing, cleansing, and lighting the streets, sewerage, all sanitary matters, hospitals, the cemetery, public baths, swimming pools, recreation grounds, parks, and the local fire brigade, across the wider local board district (being the parish).

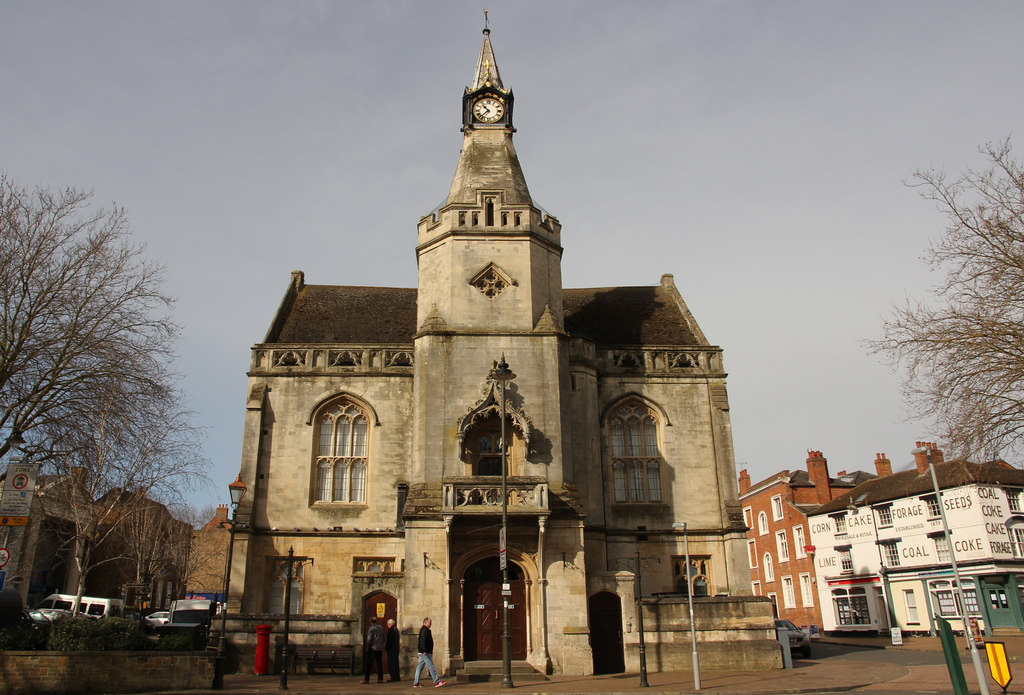
Banbury Town Hall, completed 1854

From the 17th century onwards, parishes were gradually given various civil functions under the poor laws, in addition to their original ecclesiastical functions. In some cases, including Banbury, the civil functions were exercised by subdivisions of the parish rather than the parish as a whole. In Banbury's case, the parish was split into three parts for administering the poor laws: the area of the borough, the remainder of the Oxfordshire part of the parish (known as the township of Neithrop), and the Northamptonshire part of the parish. The latter part was jointly administered with the neighbouring parish of Warkworth. In 1866, the legal definition of 'parish' was changed to be the areas used for administering the poor laws, and so the old ecclesiastical parish of Banbury (which retained its church functions) diverged from the civil parishes of Banbury (just covering the borough), Neithrop and Warkworth.

By 1889, Banbury was one of only fourteen towns in England which still had a separate borough corporation and local board. The Local Government Act 1888 directed that urban sanitary districts which straddled county boundaries (as the Banbury local board district did) were to be placed entirely in the county which had the majority of the district's population. The 1888 Act also required the remaining cases where the borough corporation was not the urban sanitary authority to be resolved. As such, Grimsbury and Nethercote were transferred from Northamptonshire to Oxfordshire with effect from 1 April 1889, in order to bring the whole district into Oxfordshire. Seven months later, on 9 November 1889, the local board's functions transferred to the borough corporation, and the borough was enlarged to cover the whole of the old local board district.

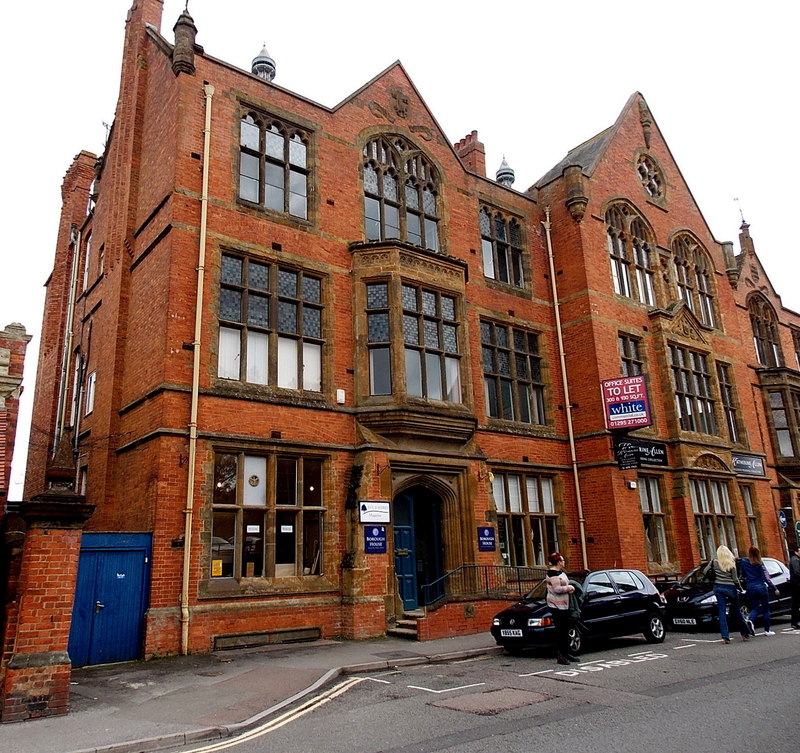
Former Municipal Technical School, Marlborough Road: Borough council's headquarters 1930–1974

The 1889 reforms did not affect civil parish boundaries, and so after 1889 Warkworth parish straddled Northamptonshire and the borough of Banbury in Oxfordshire. The Local Government Act 1894 directed that parishes could no longer straddle borough or county boundaries, and so a new civil parish of Grimsbury was created in 1894 for the part of Warkworth within the borough. The three civil parishes within the borough were then Banbury, Neithrop and Grimsbury; they were classed as urban parishes and so were directly administered by the borough council rather than having their own parish councils. The three parishes were united into a single parish of Banbury covering the same area as the borough in 1932. The borough council met at Banbury Town Hall until 1930, when it moved its offices and meetings to the former Municipal Technical School (built 1893) on Marlborough Road.

The responsibility for elementary education passed into the town council's control under the Education Act 1902. The town's supply of gas, electricity and water was in the hands of private companies until 1947, when the town council purchased the water company. In 1967, the water company's former undertakings and assets that had passed to the council were absorbed into the Oxford and District Water Board. The council also lost control to the county councils of the police in 1925 and elementary education in 1944, and the local fire brigade in 1947. The hospitals were nationalized by Clement Attlee's Labour government in 1946.

The municipal borough of Banbury was abolished in 1974 under the Local Government Act 1972, with its area becoming part of the new Cherwell district.

No parish council for Banbury was created at the time of the 1974 reforms and so it became unparished; instead, the Cherwell councillors who represented wards in Banbury acted as charter trustees to preserve the town's civic traditions, including appointing one of them to take the title of mayor each year. One such mayor, Angela Billingham (mayor in 1976), later went into national politics. A number of roads are named after former mayors, including Mascord Road, Mold Crescent and Fairfax Close. A new civil parish of Banbury was created in 2000, with its parish council taking the name Banbury Town Council. Since then, the chair of the town council has taken the title of mayor.

=== Notable mayors ===
Banbury has had several notable mayors over the years since the post was created in 1608.

- Thomas Webb was the first Mayor of Banbury town and held office in 1608, 1619, 1629 and 1638.
- George Mieholl was mayor in 1608.
- Local business man, and Parliamentarian sympathiser, Richard Vivers held it twice in 1621 and 1633.
- Thomas Whatley was mayor in 1623
- Mathew Whately was mayor in 1636.
- Organ Nicholls held it in 1641 and Aholiah West held the position from 1644 to 1645. They have the most unusual given/1st names to date.
- Lyne Spurrell was the first female mayor in 1838.
- Richard Goffe also has the longest run at five years, but not consecutively, in 1845, 1849, 1853, 1854, 1855.
- William Edmunds was mayor from 1887 to 1889 and oversaw the major expanding of the town council's borders and powers.
- William James Harding held the post from 1914 to 1918 (5 years), making his tenure the longest consecutive run so far.
- Surinder Dhesi was the town's first Asian mayor in 2004 and 2005.
- The Wheatly, Cheney (Cheyne in earlier years) and 'Edmunds families have produce more of Banbury's mayors than any others over the years with-
  - Nathaniel Wheatly (1643 and 1688), William Wheatly (1667) and Richard Wheatly (1671, 1683, 1742).
  - Richard Edmunds (1858, 1863 and 1864), William Edmunds (1887 to 1889) and Percy Spencer Edmudns (1895)
  - Robert Cheyne (1746), John Cheney (1936) and Mary Cheney (1949).
- A housing estate was named after Thomas Tims (?) (1840).
- Roads are named after Sarah Beatrice Gillett(?) (1926), William George Mascord (1929), Fred Mold (1930) and Arthur Fairfax (1897 and 1905).
- Angela Billingham was mayor in 1976.
- Gordon Ross was mayor in 2016

== Major schools ==
=== Banbury School ===
Former Cherwell British (Infants) School, and the old Dashwood school in Britannia Road was closed in the mid-2000s, with the new Dashwood school opening nearby.

Wykham Park Academy, previously Banbury School, is a mixed, multi-heritage, fully comprehensive school with 1,650 students including a sixth form. It is on Ruskin Road in the Easington ward of Banbury. The school is a specialist Humanities College.

=== Blessed George Napier Roman Catholic School ===
Blessed George Napier Roman Catholic School is on Addison Road, but also has an entrance on Springfield Avenue, in the Easington ward of Banbury. It caters for pupils from all areas of North Oxfordshire, primarily baptised Catholic children.

=== Drayton School ===
Drayton School was a comprehensive school with 650 students. It was on Stratford Road in Banbury. Its buildings are now used by the new North Oxfordshire Academy which succeeded it.

The school was opened in 1973 to relieve pupil demand for the over-subscribed Banbury School and was then exceed in two more stages. In its first year it was called Drayton Hall as it was affiliated to Banbury School. In 1974 it became independent and was renamed Drayton School. The school made local headlines in 1982 when pupils staged a rooftop protest in response to a teachers' strike.

Drayton school was known for its sports facilities, in particular the Astroturf and the athletics track, both owned by Cherwell District Council. As a result, Sport England gave the school a "sportsmark" award.

In December 1997 Ofsted placed the school in Special Measures following poor inspection results. Drayton was at the bottom of the league table for Oxfordshire, reaching an all-time low of 9% of pupils getting 5 or more A*-C grades in their GCSEs.

In September 1999 Graham Robb was appointed head teacher, with a mission to remove Drayton from special measures and for the school to pass a successful Ofsted inspection. By 2001, weaknesses in the curriculum and in teaching and learning had been addressed and Her Majesty's Inspectors of Schools (HMI) judged the school to have improved enough to be removed from Special Measures. As a result of the improvements between 1999 and 2001, the school received a 'School Achievement Award' in 2002. In the same year Drayton joined the "Specialist School and Academies Trust". In 2003 Drayton passed an Ofsted inspection.

April 2003 was a critical time for Drayton as Oxfordshire County Council wanted to merge Banbury School and Drayton School in the Banbury School and Blessed George Napier Roman Catholic site. Blessed George Napier Roman Catholic School wanted to move to the Drayton School site as the school was over-subscribed. Drayton School was also planning a joint campus with Oxford and Cherwell Valley College.

However, in the face of enormous opposition, due to the improved local reputation of the school, the County Council abandoned this proposal at an executive meeting in October 2003.

Examination results also improved during this period. The results of the SAT tests the students take at age 14 improved dramatically in 2003.

In July 2004, Graham Robb left Drayton School having achieved his two objectives. After the refurbishment he piloted, Drayton was one of the few schools in Oxfordshire to have achieved a "Healthy Oxfordshire Schools" award set by Oxfordshire County School.

In Summer 2006 Drayton achieved another all-time GCSEs record since it opened. It was then replaced by North Oxfordshire Academy in 2007.

=== North Oxfordshire Academy ===
North Oxfordshire Academy is a city academy in Banbury which opened in September 2007, replacing the former Drayton School. Its sixth form opened in September 2008. The Headteacher of North Oxfordshire Academy is Sara Billins.

At the end of the Summer Term 2007, two of the school's four main blocks, A Block and C block, were cleared and sealed off ready for refurbishment work that took place from September 2007 to the middle of 2009.

North Oxfordshire Academy is run by the United Learning Trust and sponsored by Vodafone.

In a recent Ofsted/HMI report the officials advised that the academy had innovative strategies was continuing to move in a positive direction.

=== The Warriner School ===
The Warriner School is a secondary school which opened in 1971 and is on Bloxham Road in Bloxham. It has 1,114 pupils in the 11–16 age range. It has Technology College status and serves the villages in the northern half of the Cherwell District. The school has a catering service and canteen, although school farm produce is not used for student consumption.

The school premises include a 120 acres (49 ha) farm and fully organic for livestock and grassland. The school has won the National Farmers Union's Rural School of the Year Award 2005 and Specialist Schools and Academies Trust's Most Improved Schools Club Award 2005–06. The farm sells its produce, including eggs, meat and livestock.

The Warriner Farm is used for pupil education, as Rural Studies lessons can be held on the farm, enabling teachers to demonstrate with live animals.

== Water treatment and sanitation ==
Banbury Waterworks Act 1865
- Act of Parliament
- Parliament of the United Kingdom
- Long title: An Act to incorporate the Banbury Water Company (Limited), and to make further Provision for the Supply of Water to the Town of Banbury and the Neighbourhood thereof.
- Citation: 28 & 29 Vict. c. xvi

Dates
- Royal assent: 26 May 1865

Text of statute as originally enacted

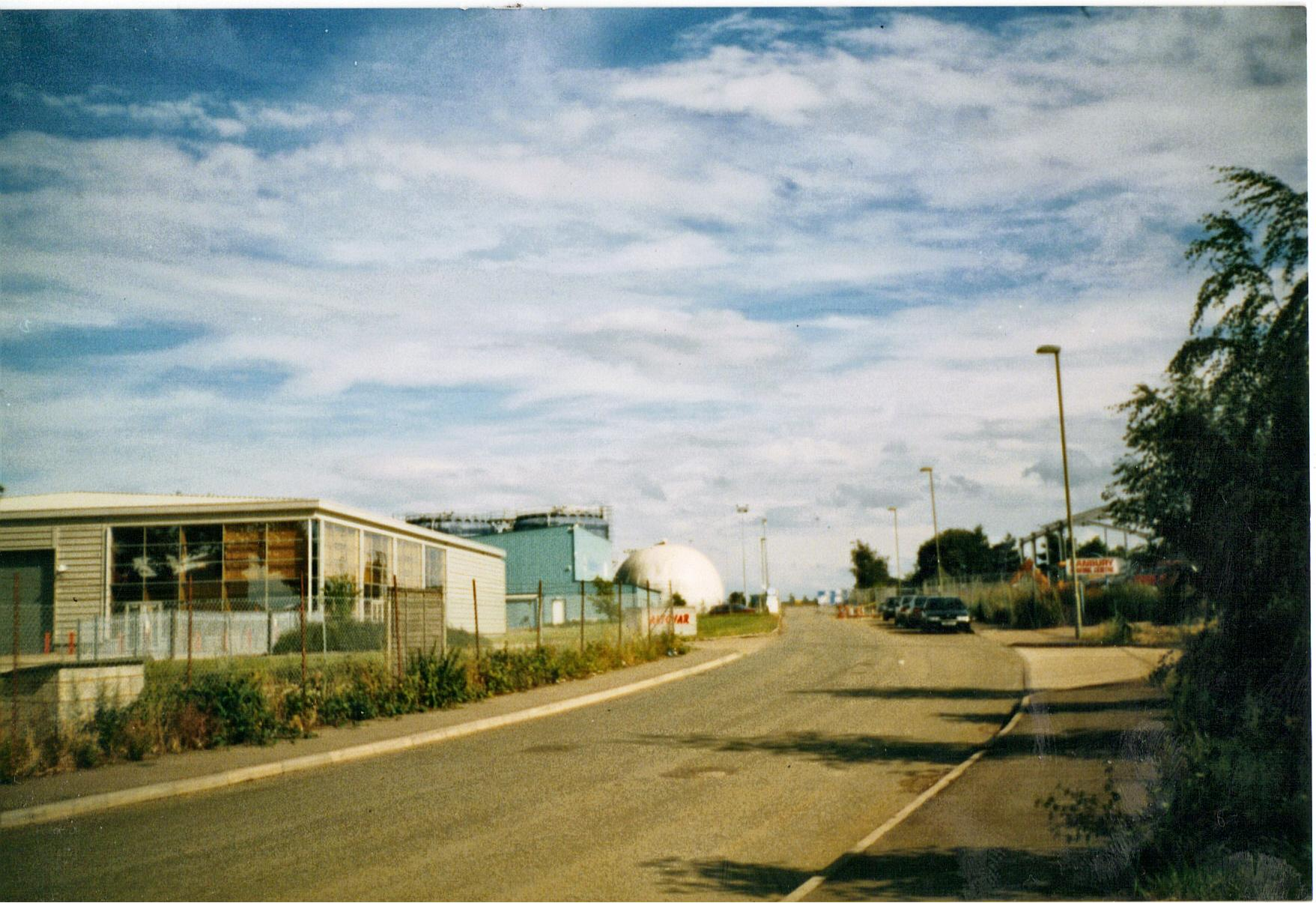
Banbury's Spittle Fields sewage works near Grimsbury in 2006. It uses an innovative "poo into power" electricity generation technique to reduce the amount of electricity it buys.

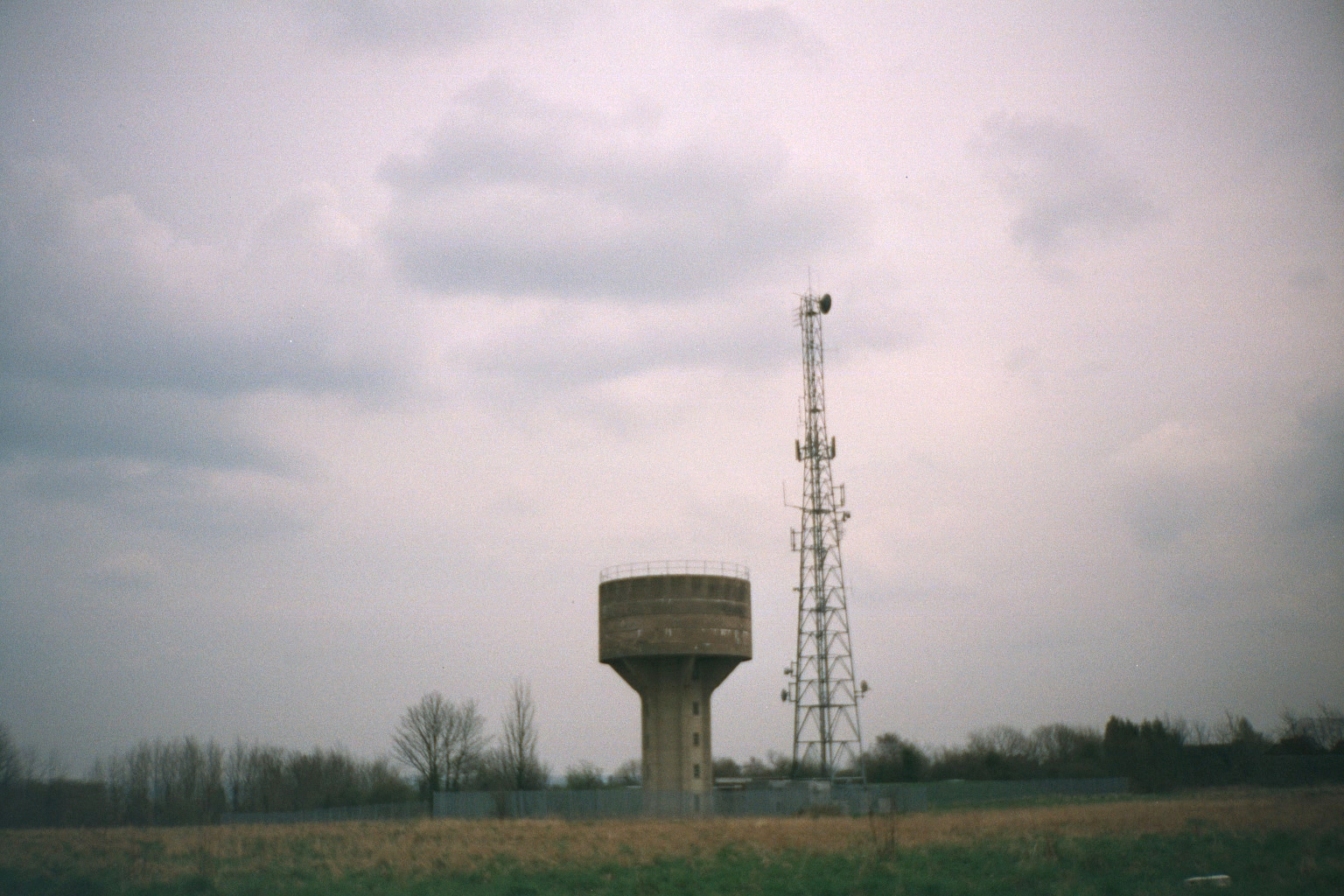
Banbury's water tower and TV/radio/mobile phone mast in 2001. It was built circa 1964.

Apart from assuming the functions of the paving commissioners, the local board of health was responsible for sewage, sewers, town culverts, health, and all sanitary matters. The local board of health was unable to finance a regular supply of water to the town, so the responsibility was taken up by the Banbury Water Company which was formed in 1854 to take water from the River Cherwell near Grimsbury, purify it by artificial (i.e. via a sand bed) filtration, and then pump it to a covered storage reservoir on land by the Oxford Road, but the works were not in operation until 1858.

Banbury has had three sewage works since the mid-19th century. They were planned out in the 1850s along with a water pumping station. The first was founded by a Quaker Pastor in the 1860s in the north of the then town, near the location of today's Spice Ball Park, and another a few years later under what is now the Beaumont Industrial Estate. Both of these had become obsolete and ceased operation in about 1910.

The public's opposition to a rate increase prevented the local board of health from purchasing the water company in 1863. By 1870 the district medical officer urged the local board of health that town's use of the company's water should be made obligatory. The board was concerned by any possible public backlash over the cost or assumed reduction in civil liberties that locals may have incurred due to the project.

In 1888 the local board of health were disbanded and its duties were taken over by the town council.

By 1900 the Banbury Water Company was supplying nearly the whole town with water and by 1914 a service reservoir with a capacity of 250,000 gallons had been constructed on the west side of the Oxford Road. It was then slightly enlarged after the Second World War.

The local council, the Municipal Borough of Banbury had taken most local waterworks over by the 1880s, along with a small reservoir near Easington farm, and the Banbury Rural District had built another on the present Spitalfields site in the 1890s as the need for formal sewerage treatment as well as water purification grew as the town expanded ever outward as illustrated in the 1882, 1900, 1910 and 1922 Ordnance Survey maps. It would be expanded after the Second World War and modernised thereafter. Banbury Rural District built Grimsbury Reservoir and the Langford Lane water pumping stations near today's Hennef Way road in abbot the mid-1960s.

A water tower was built in Neithrop circa 1964.

== Hospitals ==
The Horton General Hospital and Foscote Private Hospital are in the ward. The hospital has 236 beds and was founded in 1872 by Mary-Ann Horton. It was briefly threatened with closure in 2009, but this threat has now receded due to local pressure. It was modernised steadily from the 1960s onwards.

== Transport ==
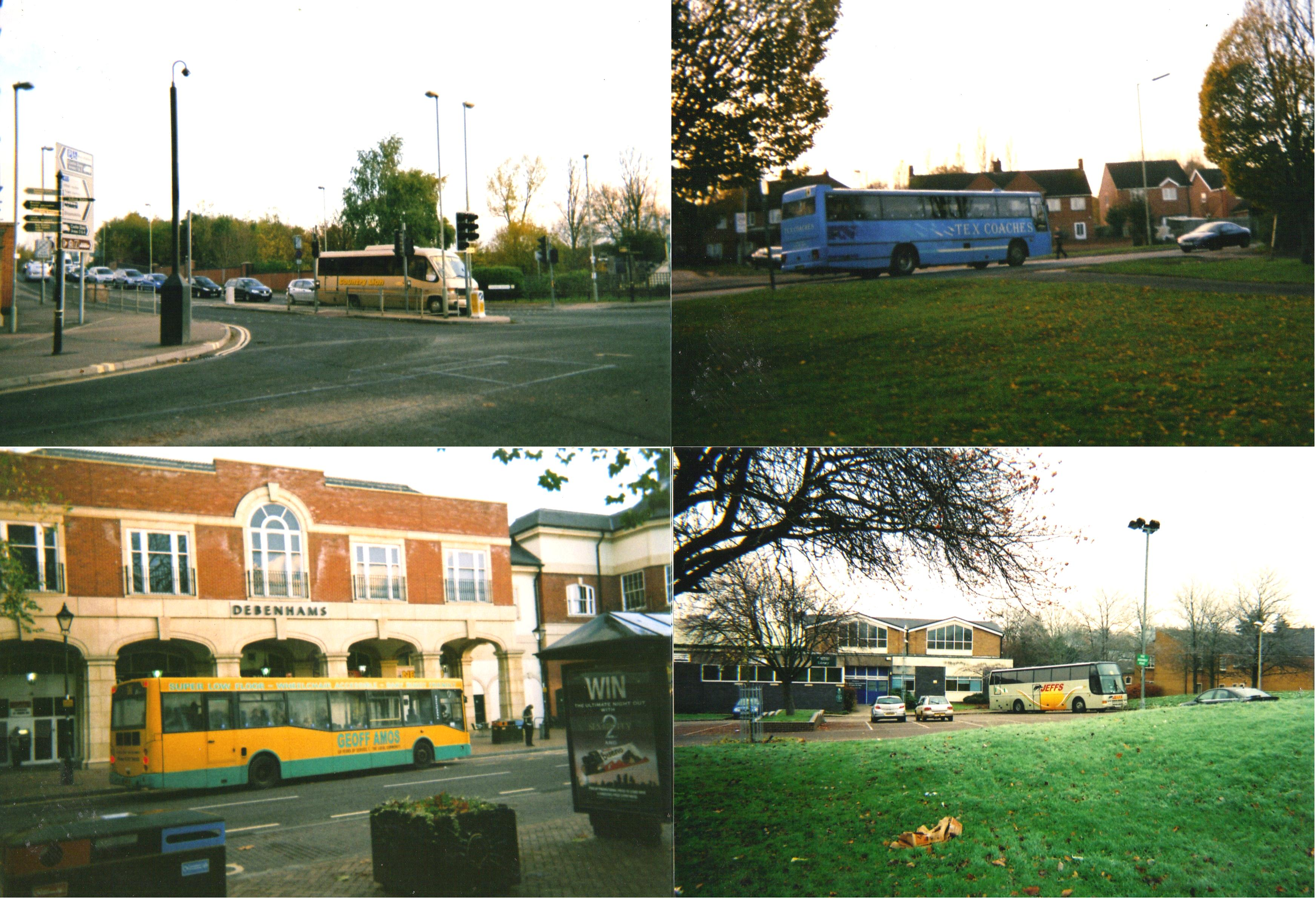
4 Banbury bus firm's busses. They are Jeff's coaches (goes nationwide), Geoff Amos (goes to Daventry and Rugby), Country Lion (Banburyshire) and Tex coaches (Midlands and Thames valley).

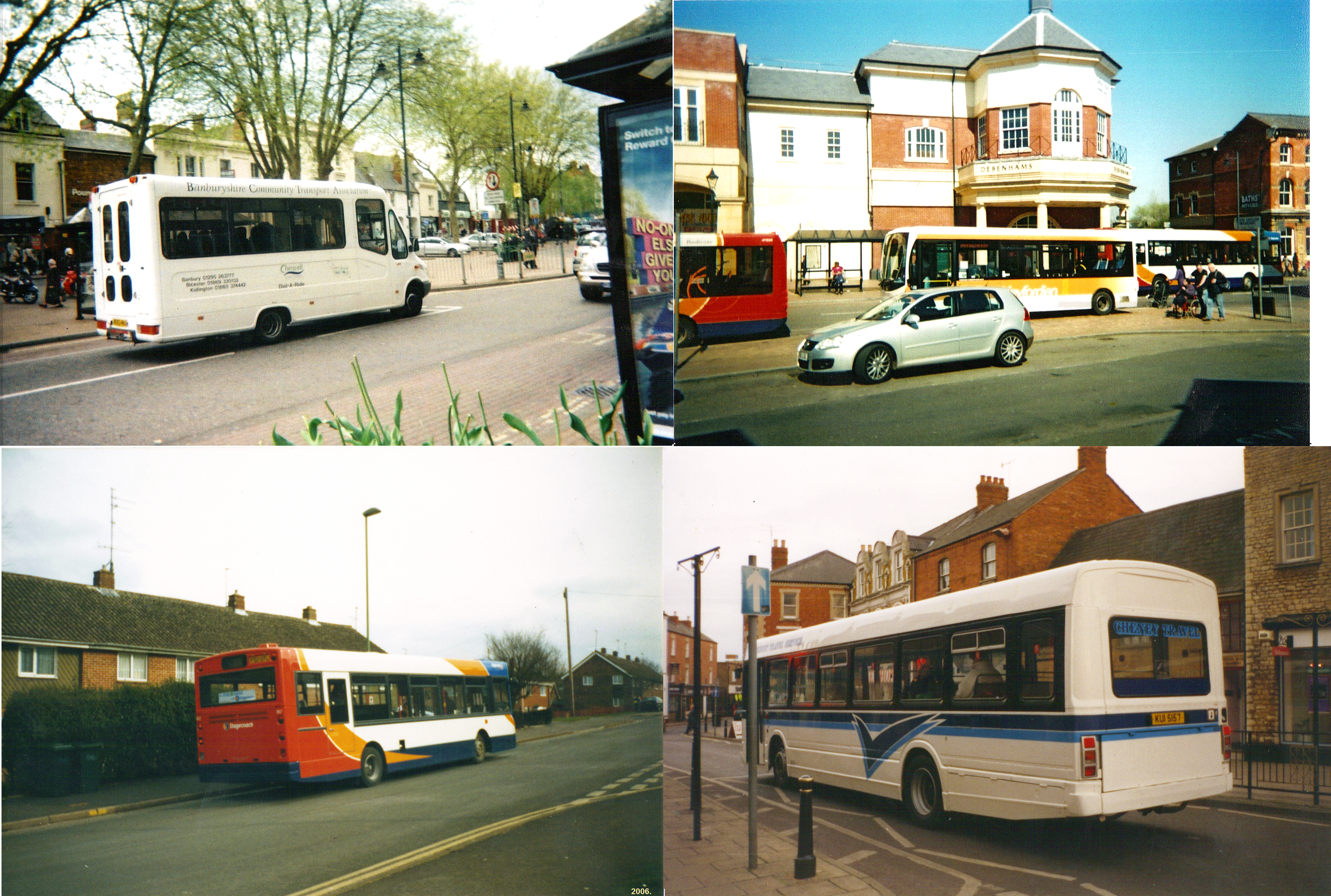
A former Cheney Coaches bus, a Heyfordian bus which no longer operates, a Stagecoach bus and a Banburyshire Community Transport Association (BCTA) bus in Banbury. The Stagecoach busses ran every 15 minutes on weekdays and every 20 minutes at weekends as of 2008 and the Heyfordian bus runs every 30 minutes, except on Sundays as of 2009.

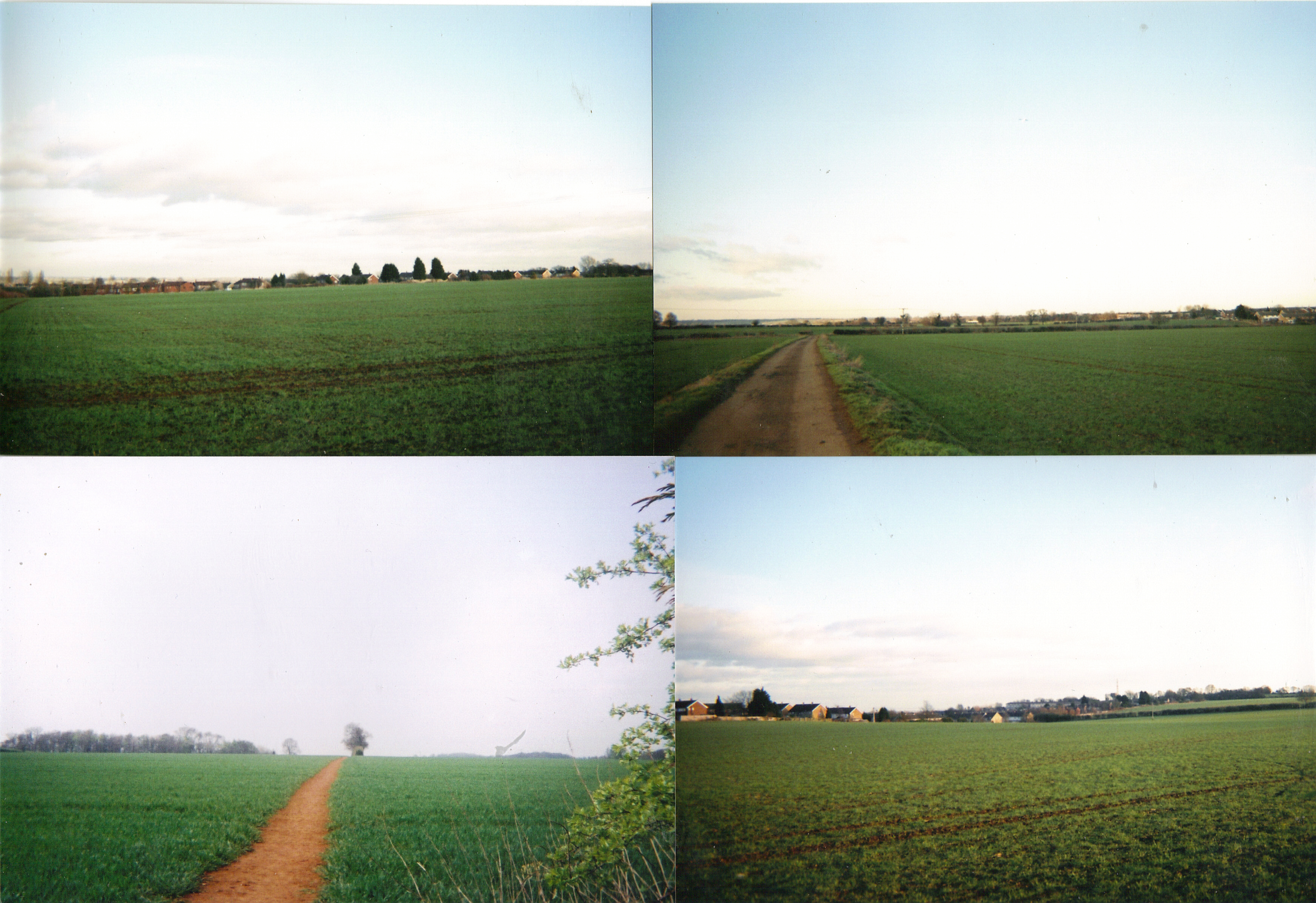
The fields between Dover Avenue in Banbury, Wythicombe Farm and Drayton52.066533°N 1.369790°W in 2010. There was a plan to build ringroad and later a housing estate on them, but this has now been dropped.

=== Waterways ===
The Oxford Canal is a popular place for pleasure trips and tourist activity. The canal's main boat yard is now the listed site Tooley's Boatyard.

=== Railways ===
The main station, now called simply Banbury after Merton Street closed in the 1960s, is now served by trains running between Bournemouth and Birmingham via Reading, Oxford and Leamington Spa, and from London Marylebone via High Wycombe and Bicester, the fastest non-stop train taking 68 minutes to London Marylebone (and 62 minutes for the return journey).

Banbury has rail services run by Chiltern Railways to Warwick and Birmingham, both running to London Marylebone via the non-electrified Chiltern Main Line. It also has services run by Great Western Railway to Oxford, Reading and London Paddington. Services to other parts of the country are provided by CrossCountry south to Reading, Southampton and Basingstoke, and north to Manchester Piccadilly and Newcastle.

=== Buses ===
Midland Red was a former bus company that operated in the Midlands, and also into Oxfordshire. The first garage opened in the town during 1919, with an initial allocation of three buses that had increased to five vehicles by 1922. Some of the larger bus companies were nationalised in 1947, by the Attlee government; but BMMO, as part of the British Electric Traction group, was not nationalised until 1967.

Banbury's division was, later to join several other towns under the title of Midland Red South when Midland Red was split up on 6 September 1981. Midland Red South Limited was bought out by Stagecoach in late 1993. It traded as Stagecoach Midland Red. It became part of Stagecoach in Oxfordshire and was corporately merged with Thames Transit's country wide depot services in 2002.

Banbury has an intra-urban bus service provided by Stagecoach in Warwickshire which feeds the outlying villages and provides transport to places such as Oxford, Chipping Norton and Brackley. Stagecoach also now runs the intra-urban bus to Rugby and Daventry that was provided by Geoff Amos Coaches until they closed in August 2011. Heyfordian Travel operates smaller services not covered by those of Stagecoach including routes from Banbury to places including Bicester, the Heyfords, Ardley, Towcester, Wappenham and Northampton. A local operator - Tex Coaches also runs regular routes from Banbury Town Centre to Brackley via Kings Sutton and Greatworth. Banbury is also served by the National Express coach service which runs regular services in and out of Banbury, to/from major UK towns and cities.

The Banburyshire Community Transport Association Ltd charity provides special transport services for disabled in and around the town of Banbury.

=== Public roads ===
The M40 motorway now runs close to the west of the village of Aynho with the nearest access at junction 10, with the A43 trunk road about 3.5 miles (5.6 km) south.

By the turn of the 1980s, plans had been unveiled to extend the motorway from Oxford to Birmingham through Banburyshire, Cherwell Valley and Warwickshire. This was constructed between 1988 and 1990 from Junction 8 joining the M42 (Junction 3A) near Hockley Heath.

There was a particularly nasty crash just north of Banbury in the winter of 1997, in which 1 person died and 9 were injured, due to a lorry hitting black ice and skidding into an oncoming tanker truck. Several cars were also later involved in the incident.

The Hennef Way bypass in central Banbury was built in 1985 to relieve town centre congestion and improve accessibility between the town and motorway. It was built between Grimbury's Old Manor farm and the Grimsbury Reservoir. The farm was demolished and replaced by an office and car show room. Hennef Way was named after the German town of Hennef. Hennef Way (A422) was then upgraded to a dual carriageway easing traffic on the heavily congested road and providing better links to north Banbury and the town centre from the M40.

A bypass was planned for the mid-1980s as both the 1983 and 1985 O.S. maps and a planning application of that time map show. The route would have been roughly from outside Drayton School, past Trinity Close and then through the still inbuilt part of Bretch Hill and Appleby close, past Dover Avenue, then beyond the water tower and communications mast (both made circa 1964), and into Easington via land just south of Crouch Hill and finally coming on to the main road south of the Poets' Corner or Timms estates. The Bretch Hill Road may have remained a long cul-de-sac not reached the main road near the Drayton School or have had Appleby and Penrith closes added to it, if the long planned Banbury bypass had gone ahead in the early to mid-1980s as the 1973, 1977, 1983 and Ordnance Survey maps help illustrate.

In 2005 Oxfordshire County Council proposed building a ring road around Banbury, connecting the M40 to the Oxford Road at Bodicote, to ease town centre traffic. However, this is not expected to be built until 2016 at the earliest.

== Banbury United F.C. ==
Banbury United F.C. was first formed as Spencer Villa in 1931 and their home matches played at Middleton Road. At this time it was essentially a works club. In 1934, they changed their name to Banbury Spencer and moved to the Spencer Stadium. They had a lot of early success, winning most of the leagues which they played in.

== Banburyshire ==
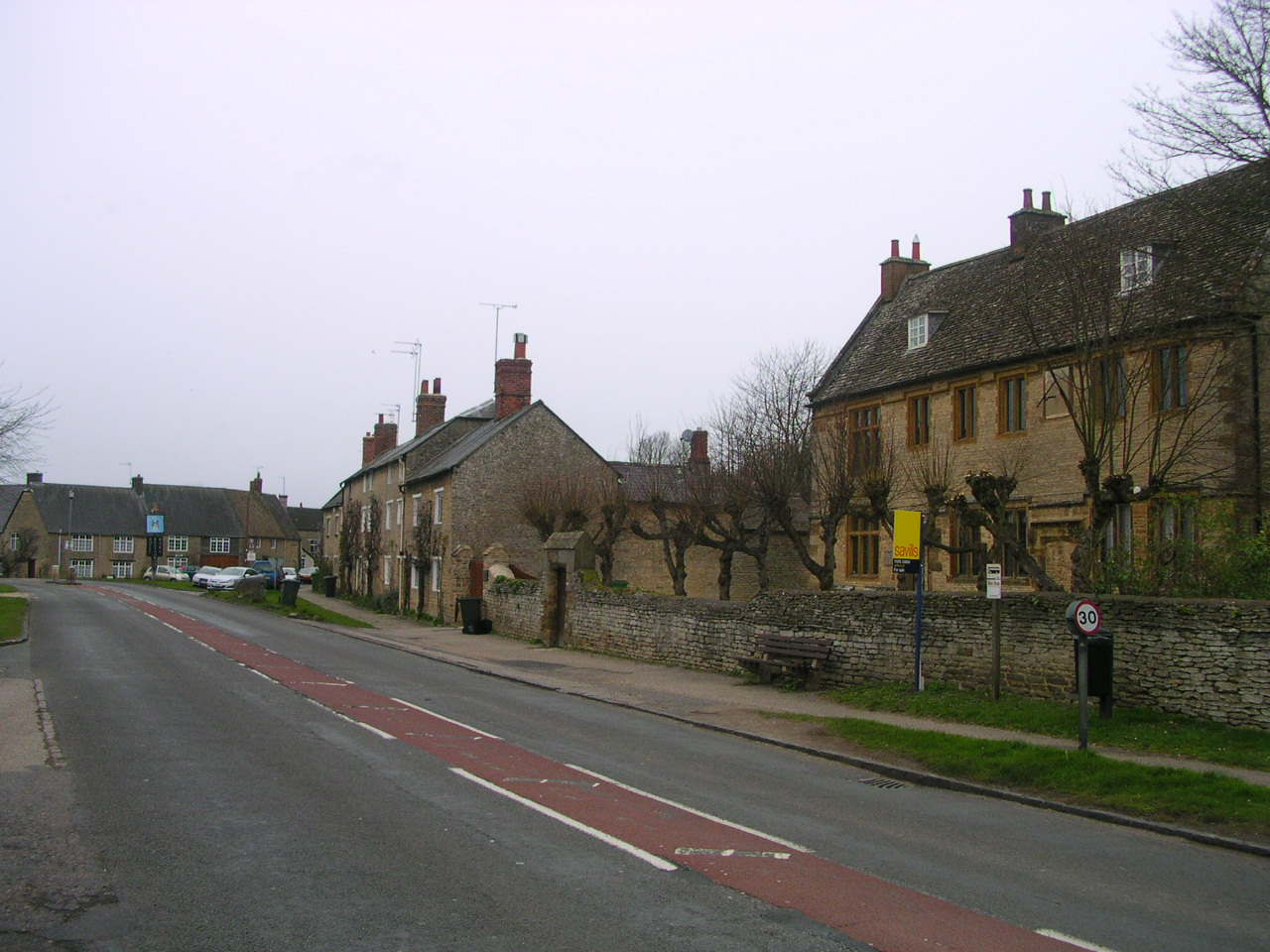
Some old houses in Aynho (formerly spelt Aynhoe), which is in Banburyshire.

Banburyshire is an informal area (52°4′N 1°20′W) of England comprising the region within approximately 20 miles of the market town of Banbury. The county of Oxfordshire has two main commercial centres, the city of Oxford itself, which serves most of the south of the county, and Banbury, which serves the north (such as Adderbury, Deddington, Wroxton, Great Bourton and Bloxham), plus parts of the neighbouring counties of Northamptonshire and Warwickshire. Hook Norton brewery, on the outskirts of Banburyshire, is one of Britain's last working tower breweries (by April 2006) and supplies several Banbury and Oxfordshire pubs with beer.

From the former, the villages of King's Sutton and Middleton Cheney, and possibly also Aynho, Fenny Compton, Charlton and Croughton could be considered part of Banburyshire, and from the latter Upper and Lower Brailes also fall within Banbury's sphere of influence. Both the settlements of Bicester, Hinton-in-the-Hedges, Chipping Norton and Hook Norton are also on the border of Banburyshire's area.

=== Roman and Anglo-Saxon events ===
During excavations for the construction of an office building in Hennef Way in 2002, the remains of a British Iron Age settlement with circular buildings dating back to 200 BC were found. The site contained around 150 pieces of pottery and stone. Later there was a Roman villa at nearby Wykham Park. Remains of a substantial Roman villa were found just west of the B4100 main road, near Hanwell, Oxfordshire. A Roman town once stood at Blacklands, 0.5 miles (800 m) north of the village of King's Sutton and coins from the 4th century AD have been alo been found there. The Anglo-Saxon Chronicle recorded that Vikings raided the village of Hook Norton in AD 913. Banburyshire, Warwickshire and Northamptonshire were on the Front line of the Viking/Anglo-Saxon conflict of that time. and a parish church was built there by AD 922. The Domesday Book records that in 1086 Hook Norton had 76 villagers and two mills.

== Cherwell Edge ==
Cherwell Edge in Northamptonshire (52°6′N 1°17′W) is near the River Cherwell, north-west of Banbury. The once heavily wooded hill and valley was mostly cleared by 1925 and the nearby golf courses were built in the early 1960s. The area now also covers the nearby Cherwell Edge Golf Club that was recently built by it to. The golf club is used by various local residents and is one of Banburyshire's leading courses.

== See also ==
- Alcan
- Banbury Guardian
- Banbury Merton Street railway station
- Banbury railway station
- Banbury Rural District
- Banbury Sound 107.6FM
- Banbury (UK Parliament constituency)
- Banburyshire
- Bodicote
- Drayton, Cherwell
- Horton General Hospital
- Kraft Foods Banbury
- Midland Red buses
- Middleton Cheney Rural District
- Norbar Torque
- November 2010 European Windstorms
- Oxfordshire Ironstone Railway
- Prodrive
- Westminster Group
- Westminster group plc
- National Filling Factory, Banbury

== Gallery ==
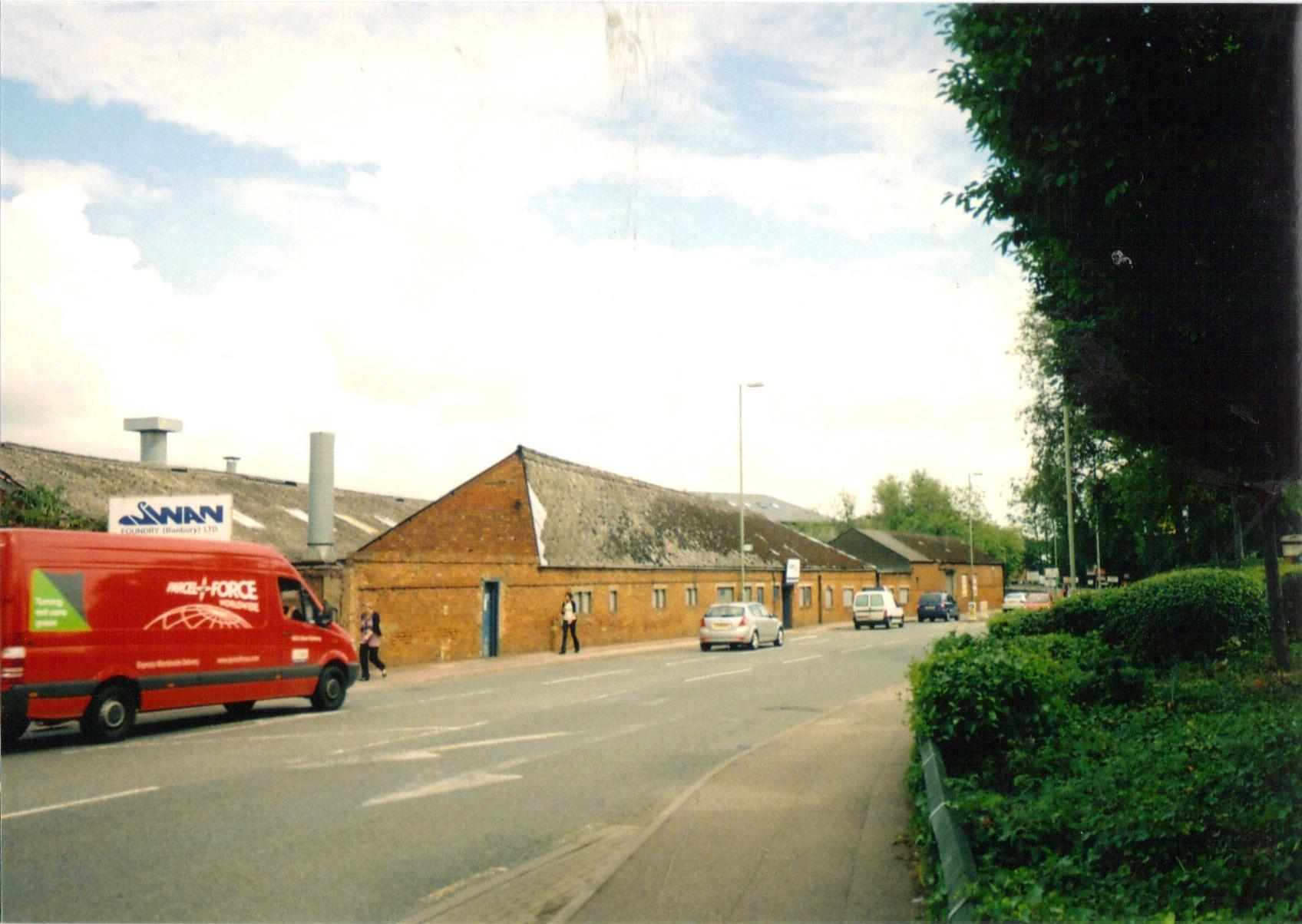
A former work shed in Banbury's Tramway Estate, opposite Morrison's supermarket in 2011. It is now used by Lazercraft, Wacky Wardrobe and Swan Foundry. It was built in about 1880 and was part of the former Britannia Works complex.

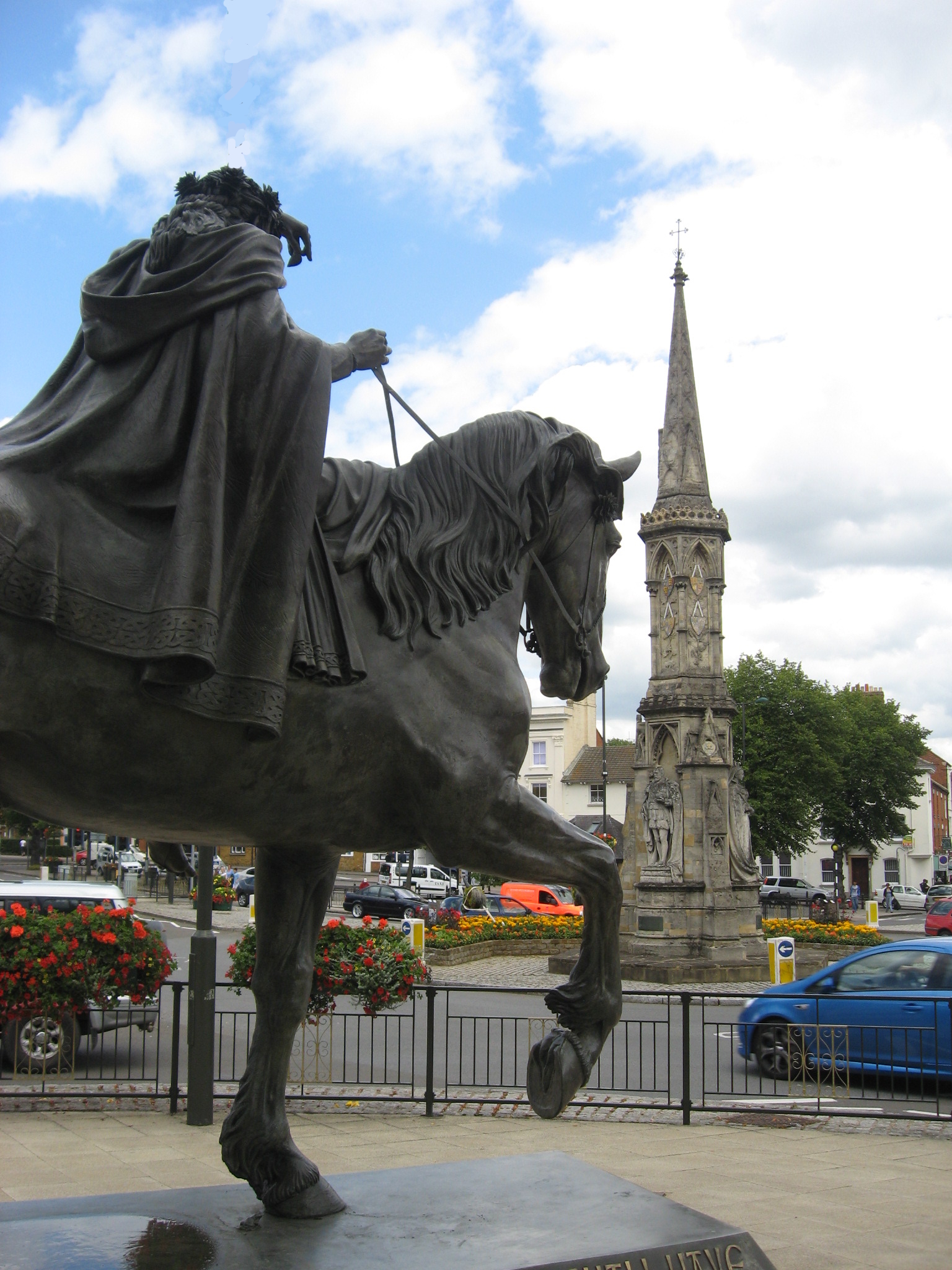
The 2006 'fine lady' and 1859 Banbury Cross.

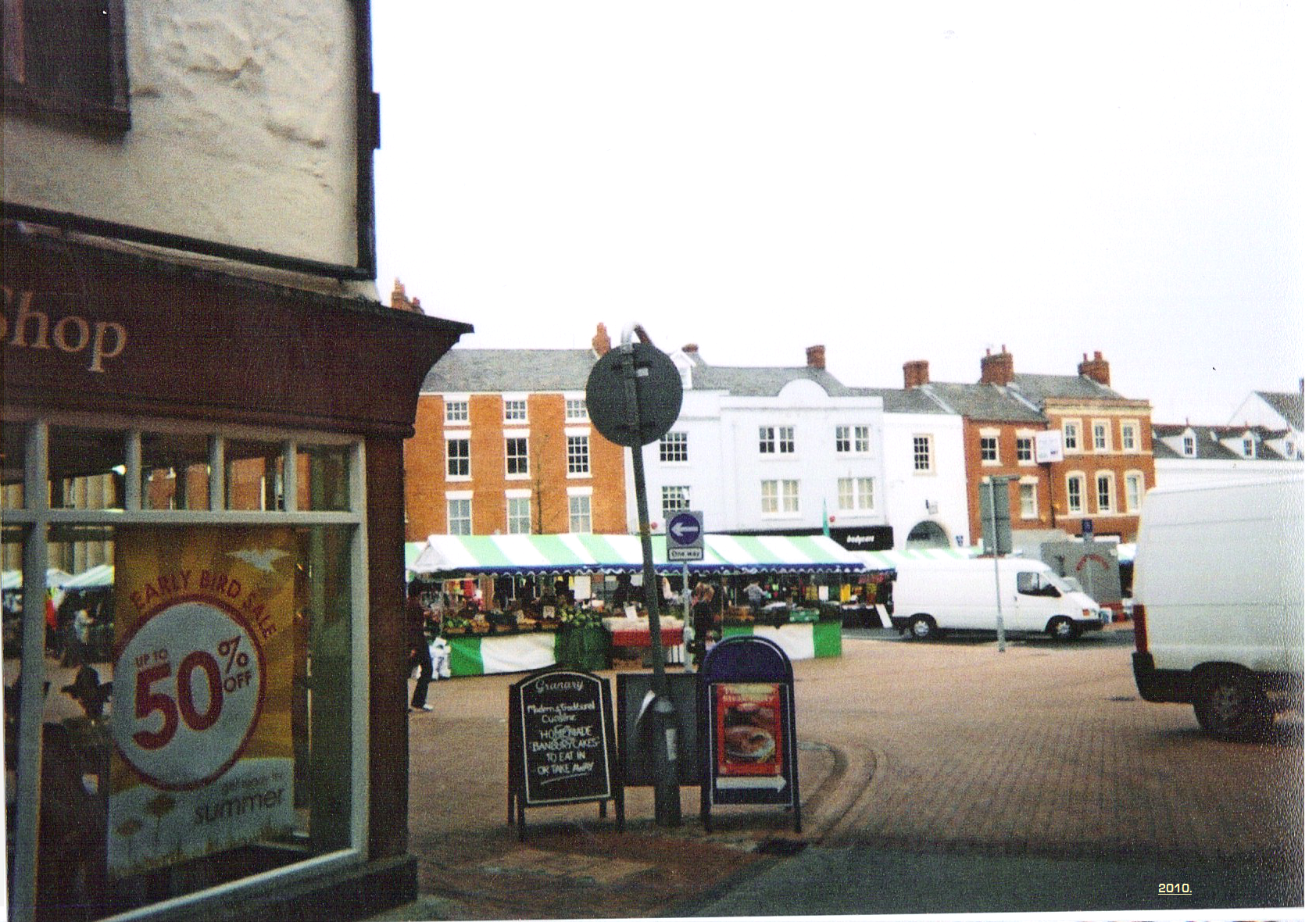
The building on extreme left foreground (the one where the sign is cut off to read " 'hop".) apparently has, on its Market Place-facing side, musket ball holes which date from the English Civil War. It was built in 1570. The muskets were fired from the castle, which stood on the other side of the Market Place, roughly where that row of buildings in the background stands.

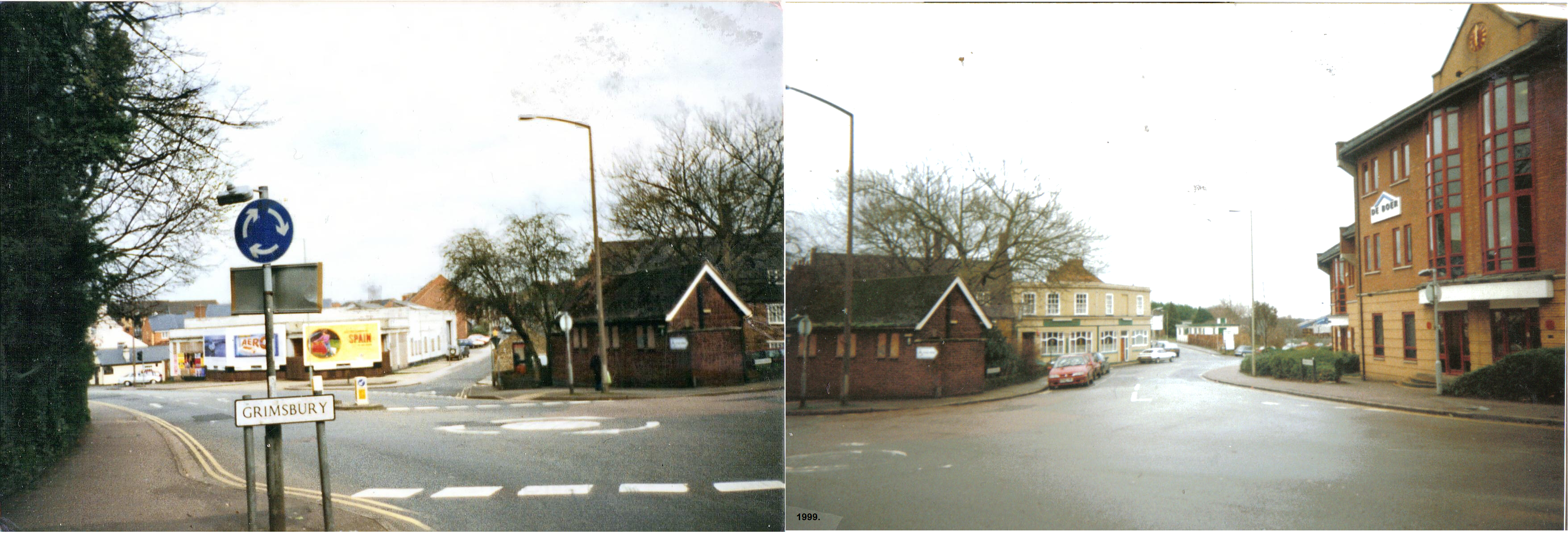
Grimsbury in 1999 (right) and 2000 (left) prior to its redevelopment from 2004 to 2008. The Irish pub was reduced in size and renovated, a house was built on part of the old pub, the public toilet was removed in favour of a very small park and the garage became a Londis shop.

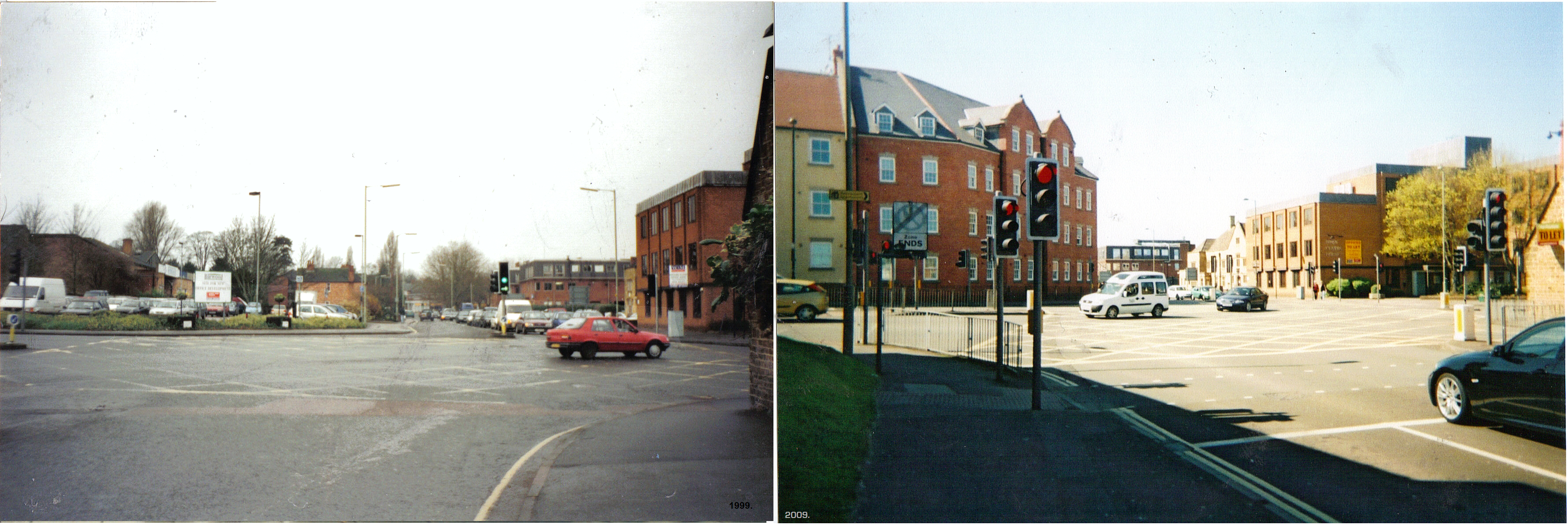
The "Shires" crossroads in 1999 to the left, prior to redevelopment in 2003, and the same place in 2009 to the right.

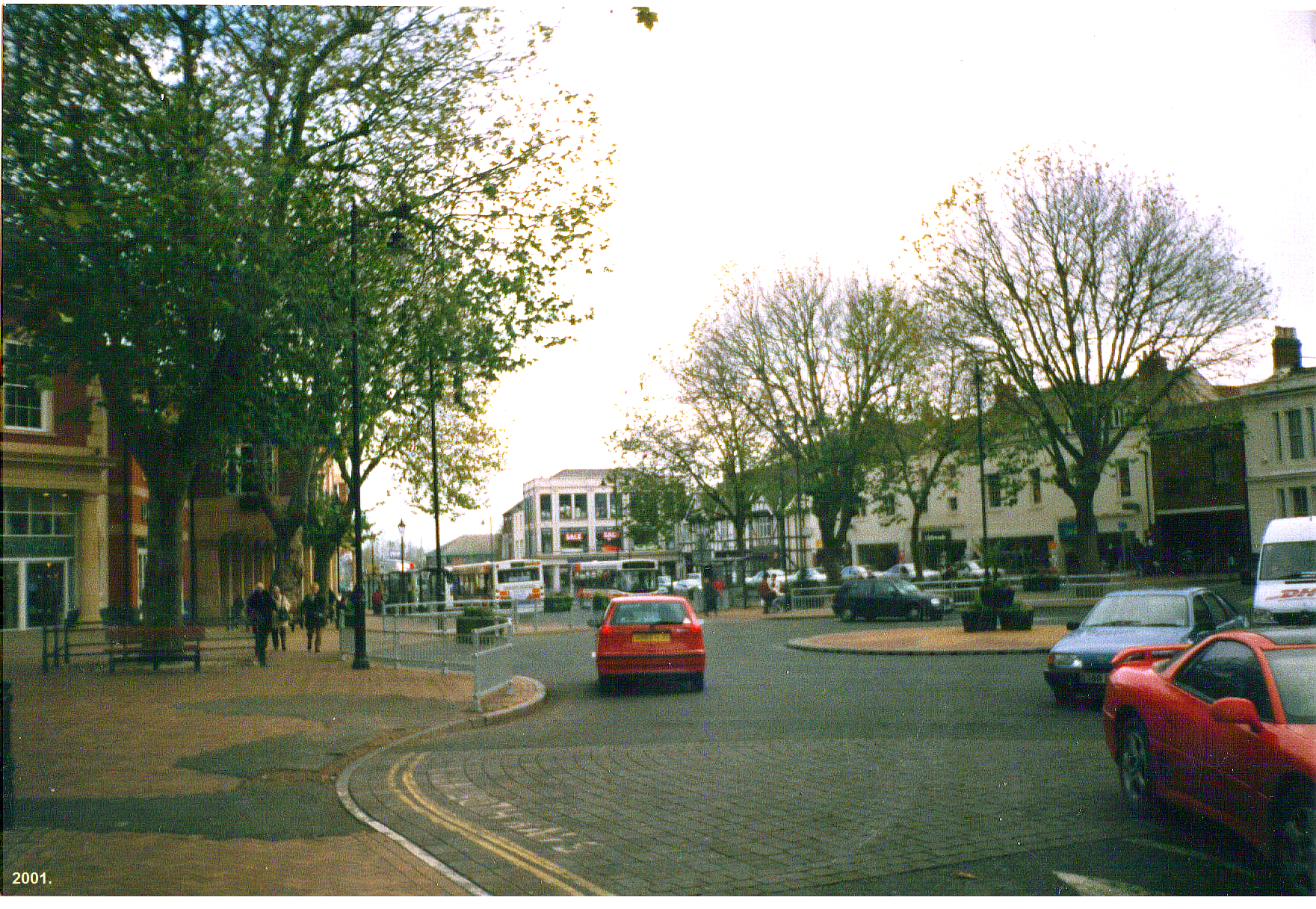
Bridge Street in 2001.

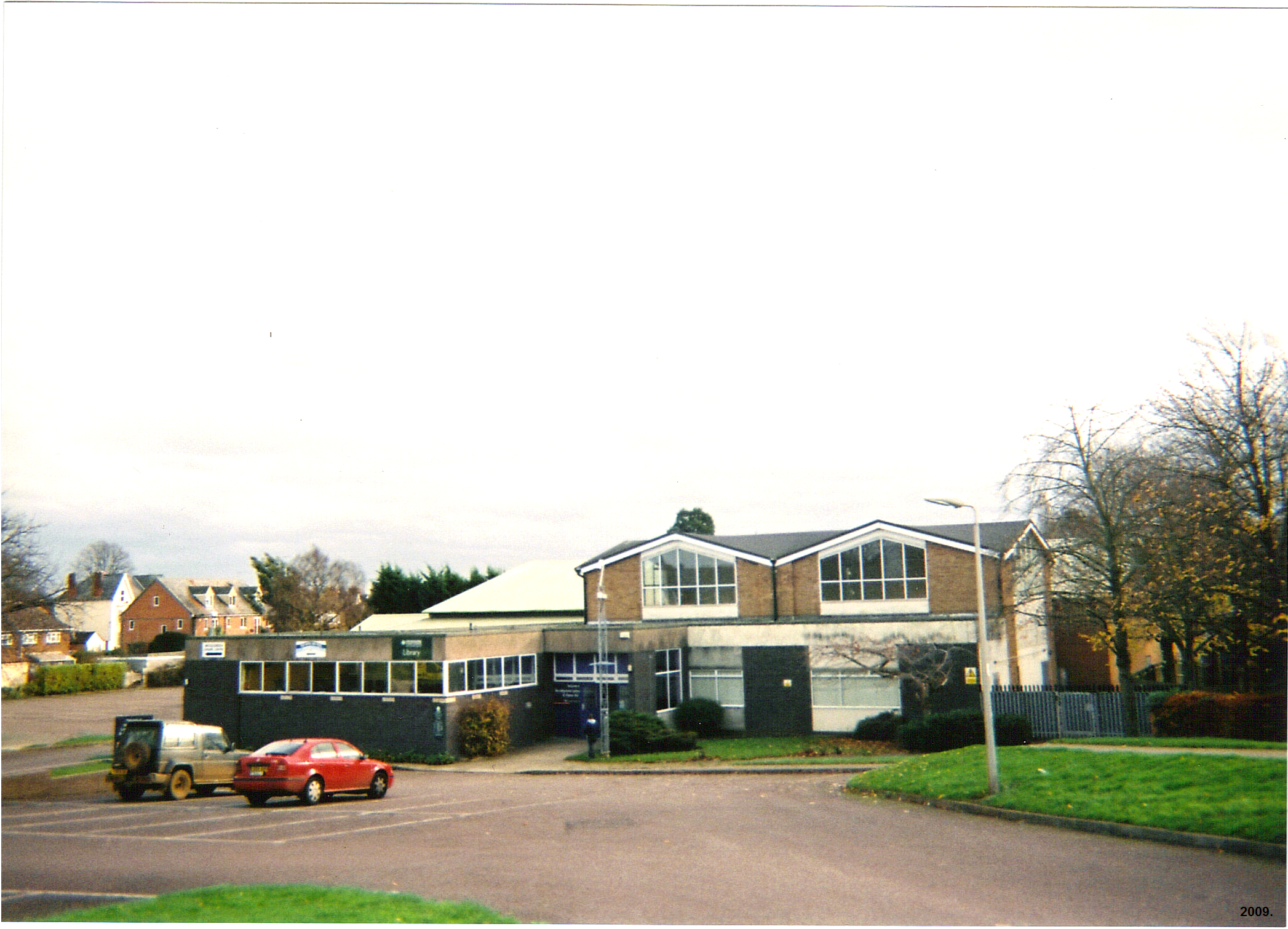
Neithrop Library.

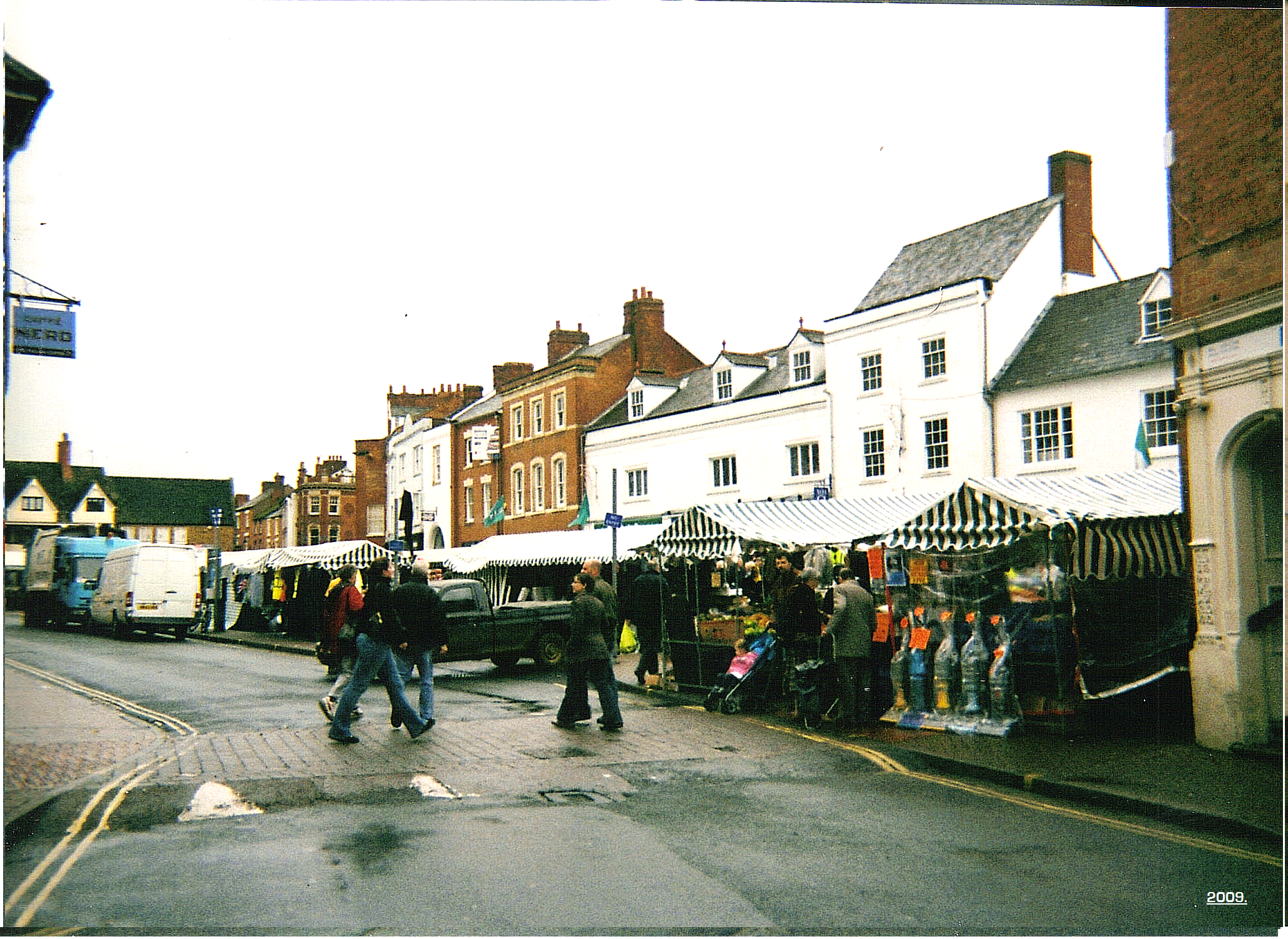
Banbury Market

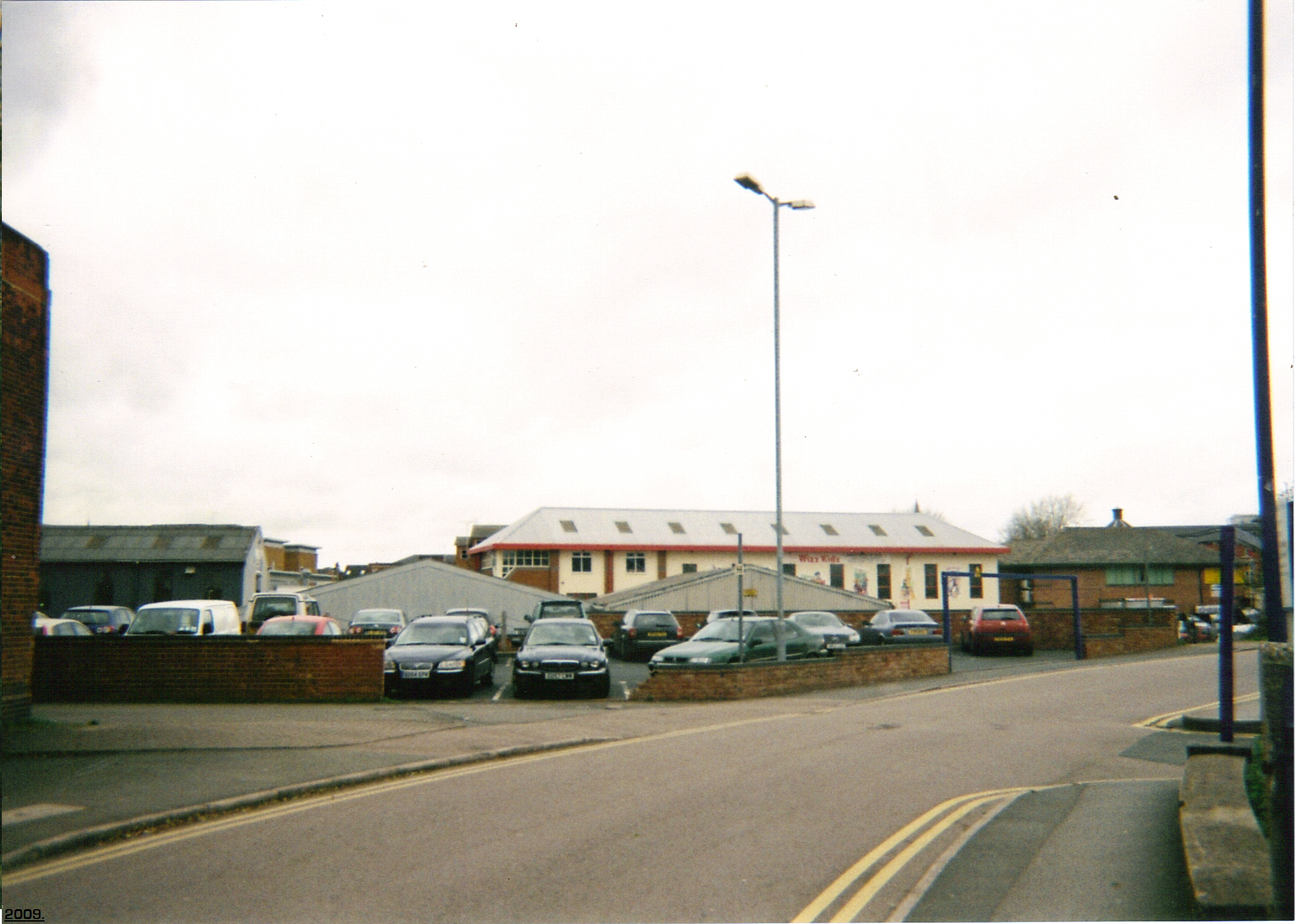
The station car park. The Whiz Kids' Nursery and activity centre is in the background.

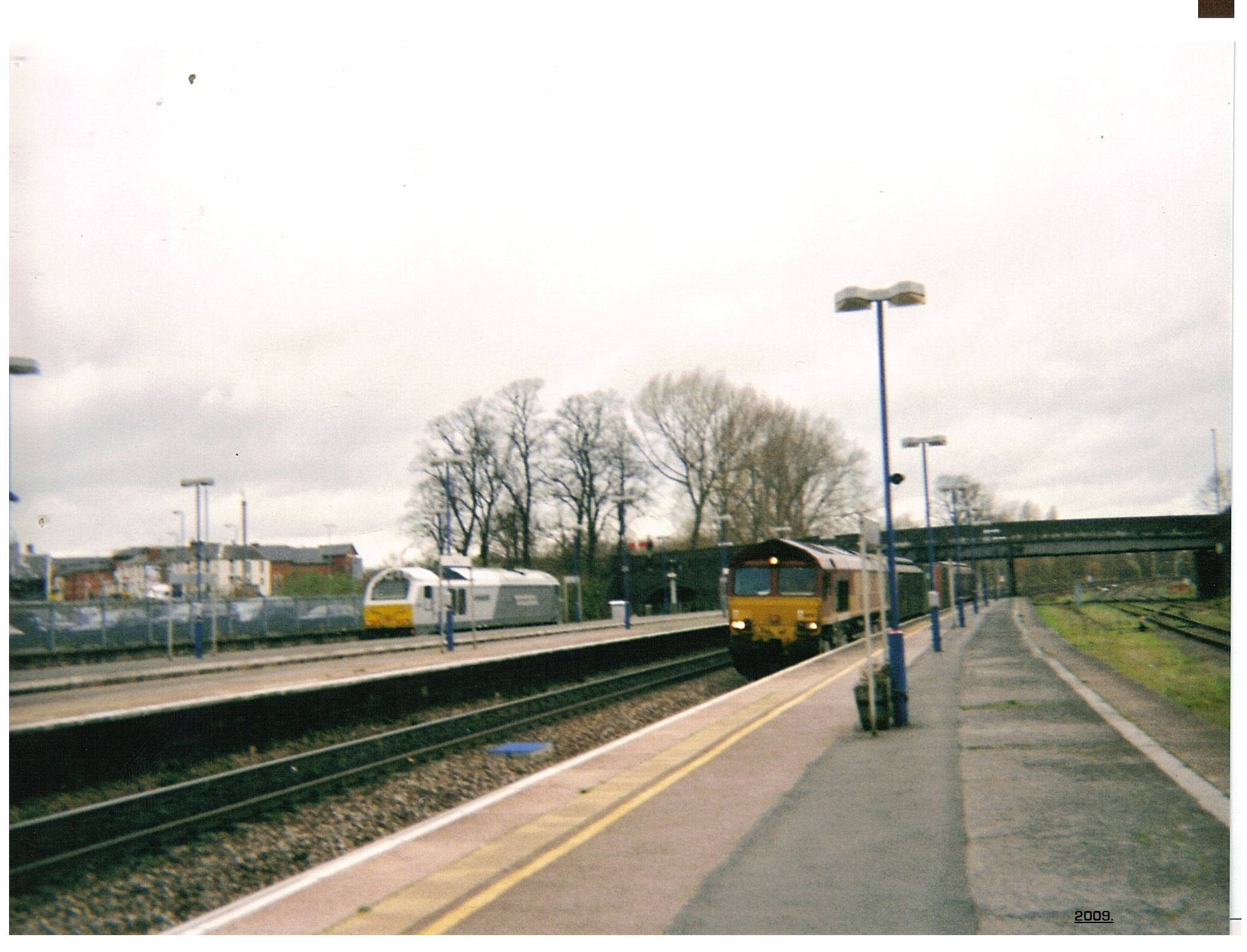
Banbury station. An EWS freight rain and a Wrexham, Marylebone train are here too.

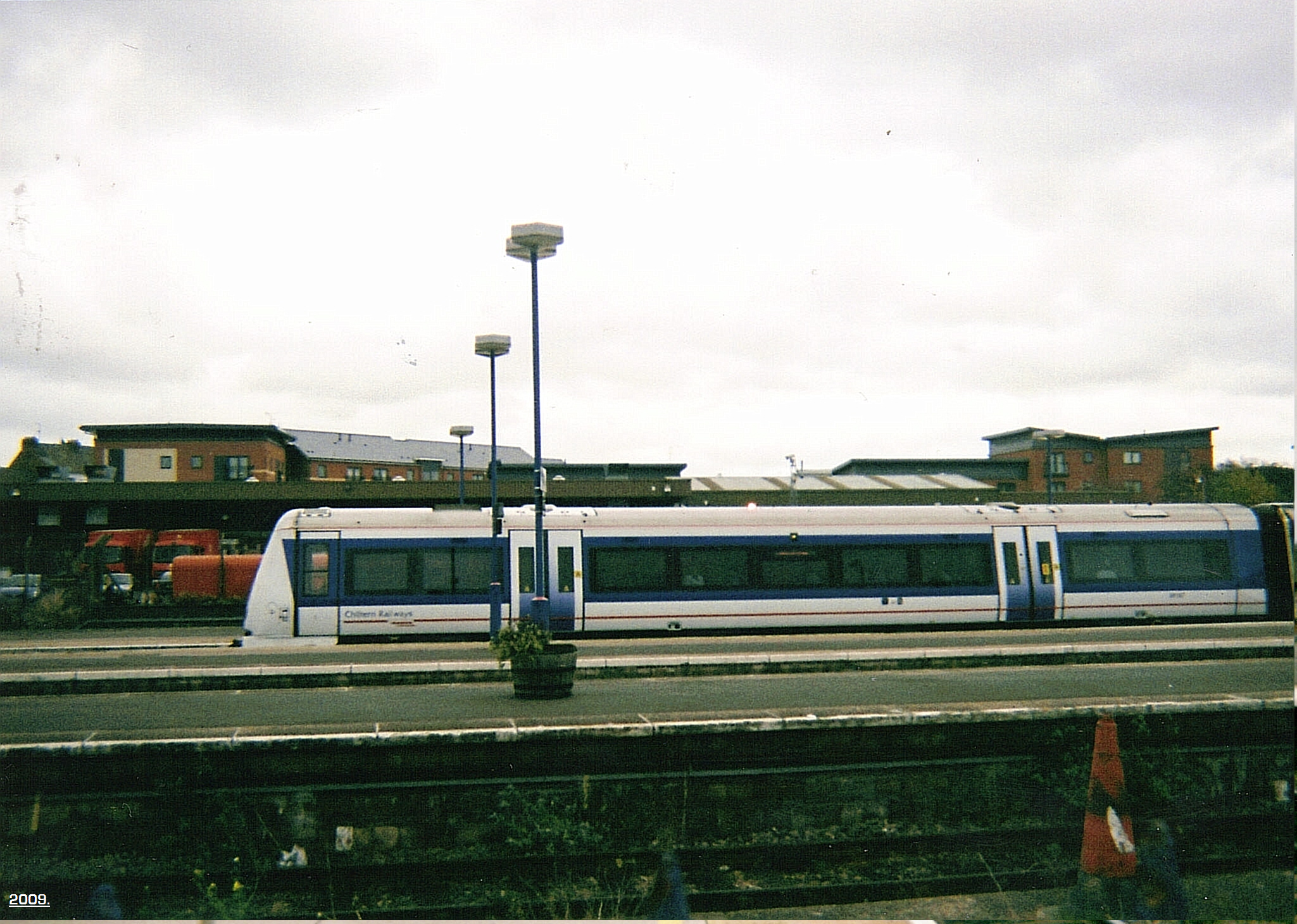
Banbury station. A Chiltern Railways Train arrives at Banbury railway station.

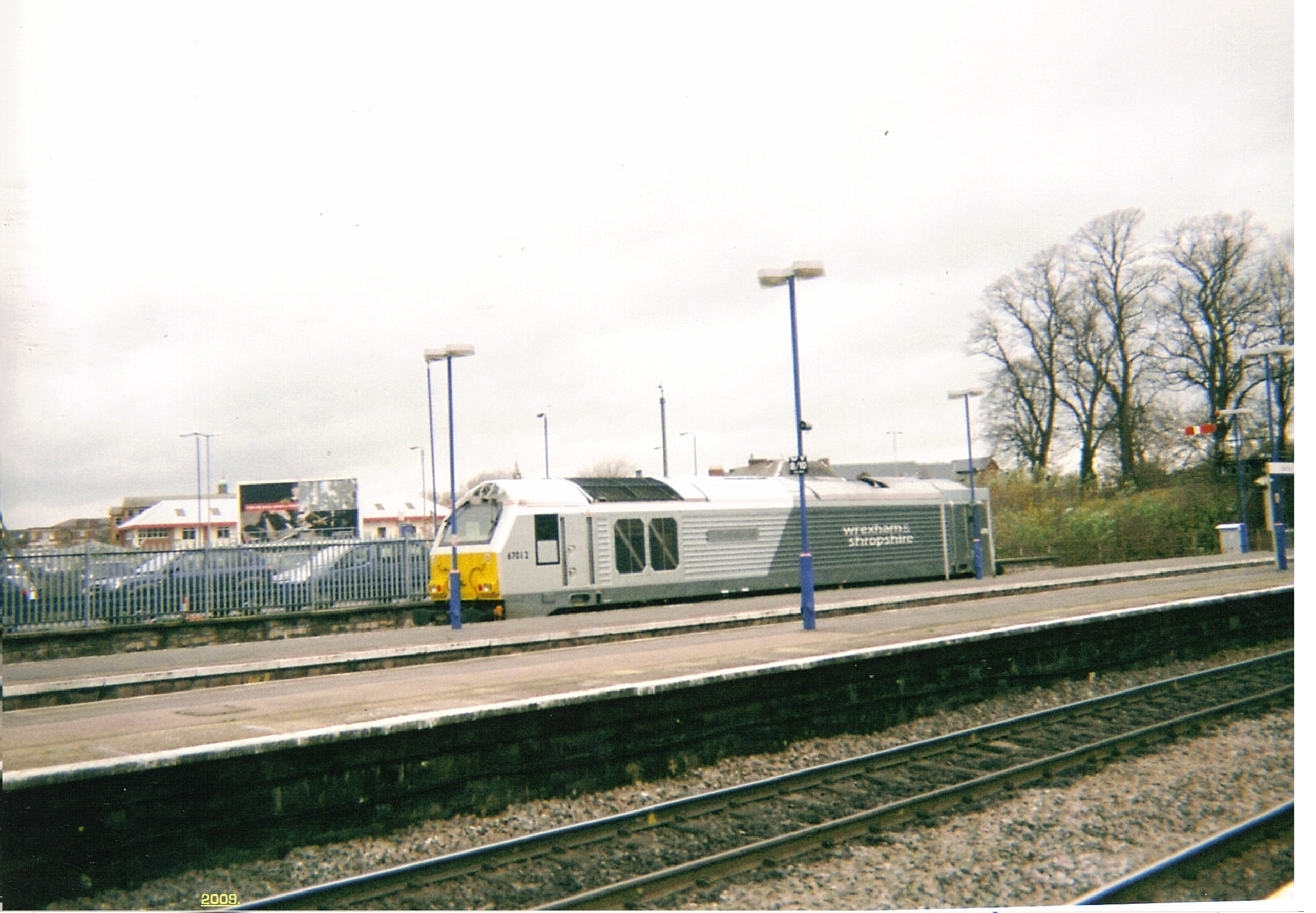
Banbury station. A former Wrexham & Shropshire locomotive stabled at Banbury station.

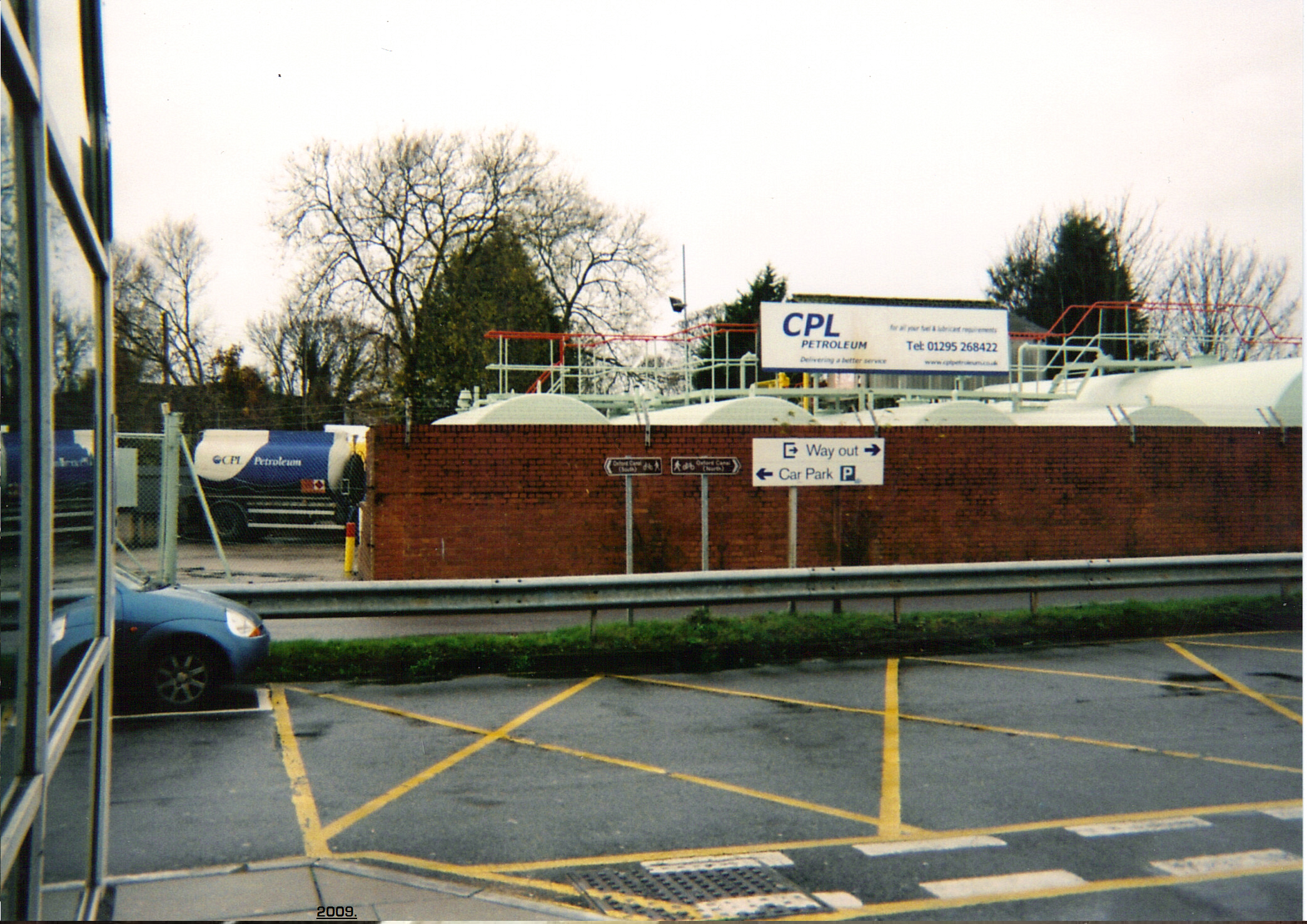
The 60-year-old oil terminal next to Banbury station. (It was upgraded circa 1980).

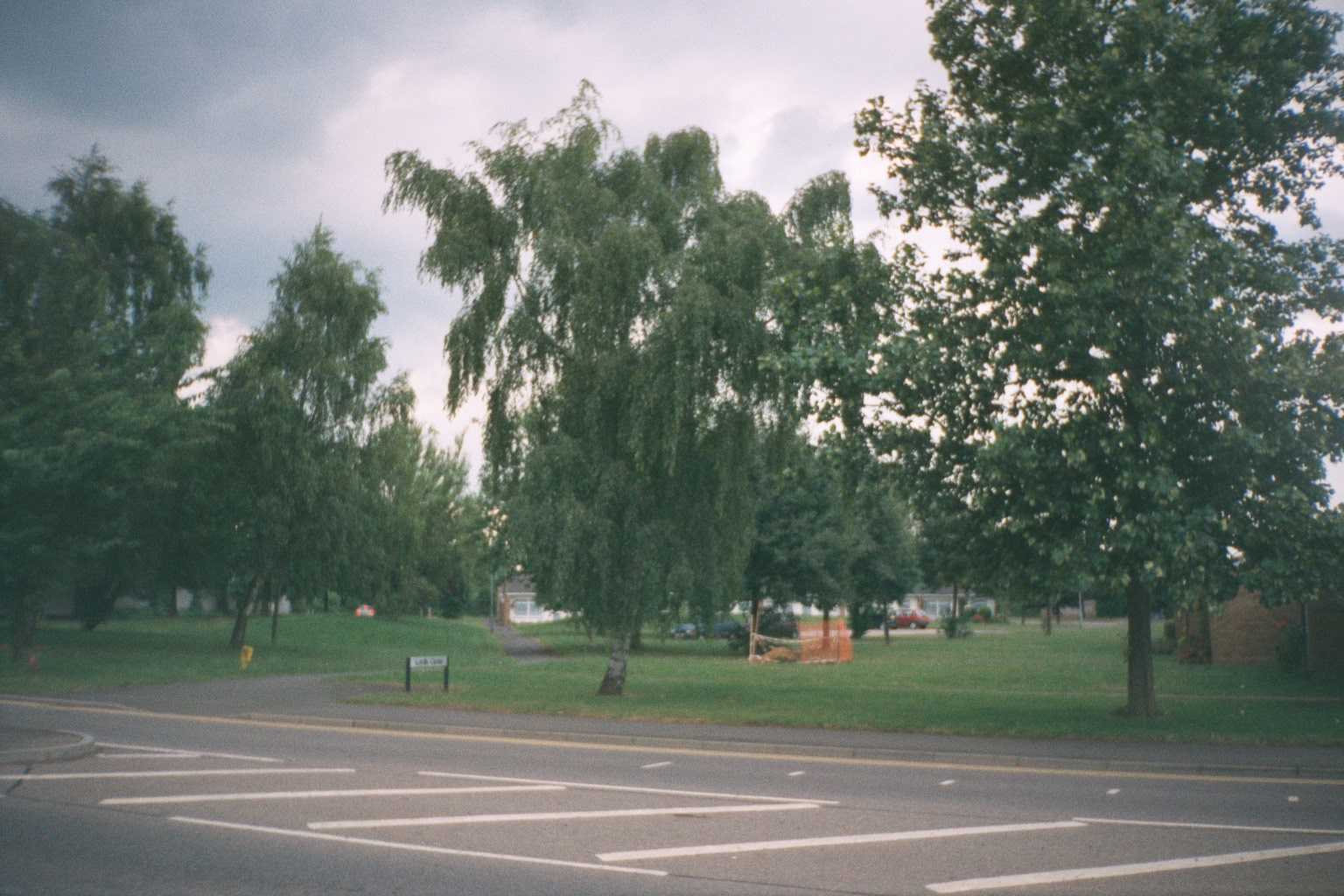
Browning park in Easington estate in 2001.

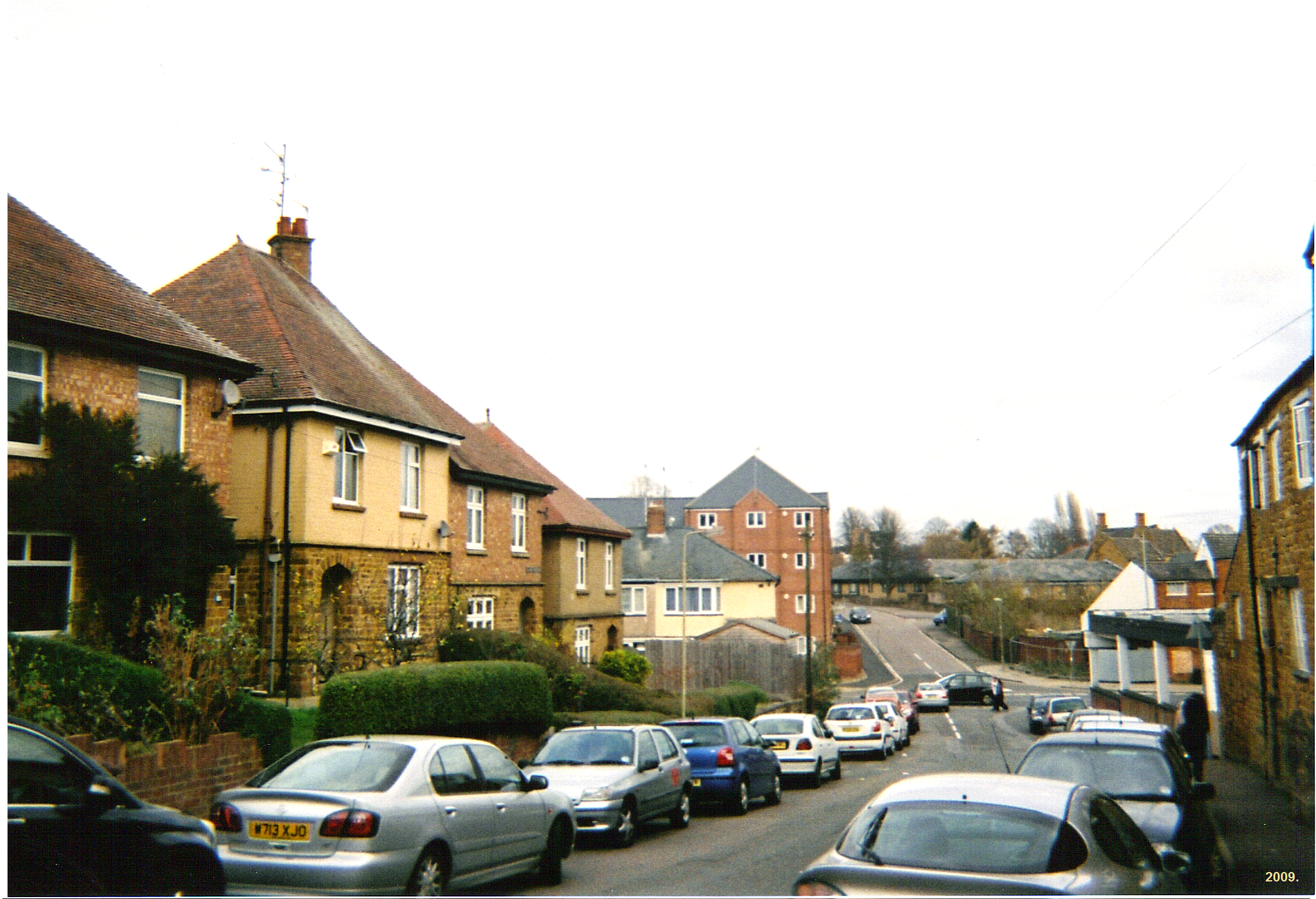
Part of the Neithrop estate, built in the 1920s or 1930s.

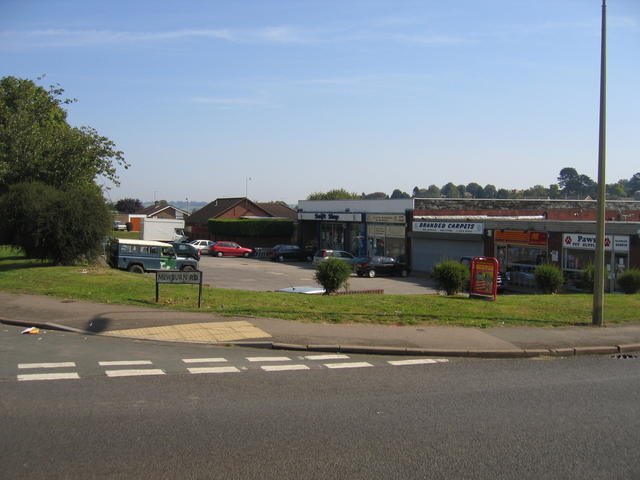
Local Shops. The small 1960s shopping precinct at the junction of Mewburn Road and the Queensway, Banbury.

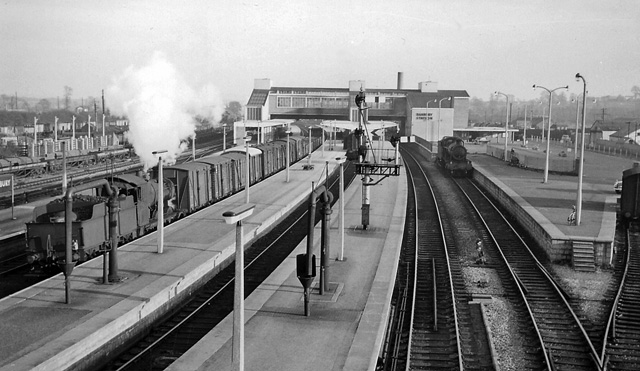
Banbury Station View SE, towards Oxford and London. This is the main (General) station, on the former GWR Paddington to Birmingham line, so decrepit and a bottleneck it was rebuilt very soon after Nationalisation. Date 24 March 1961(1961-03-24).

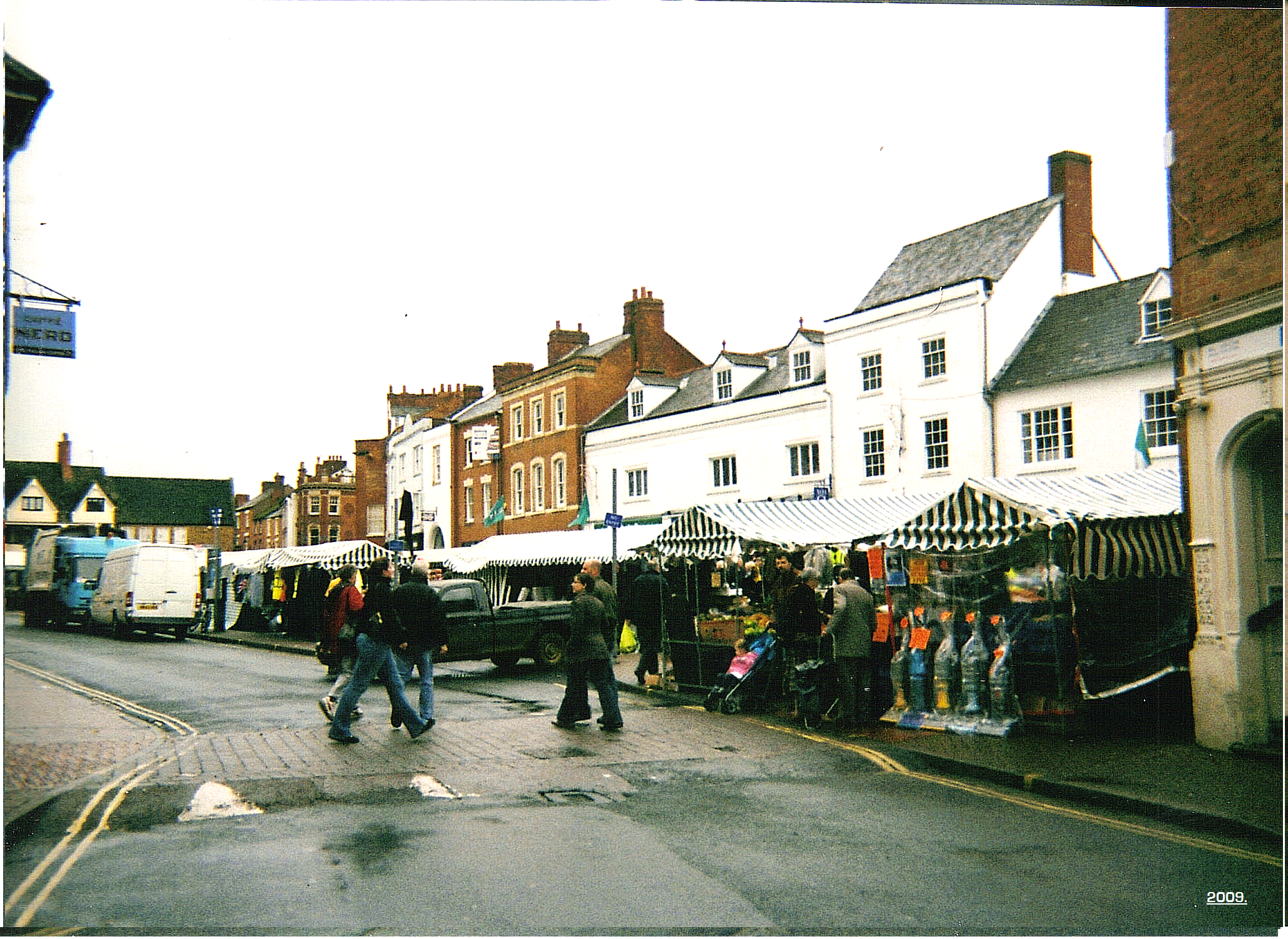
Banbury Market.

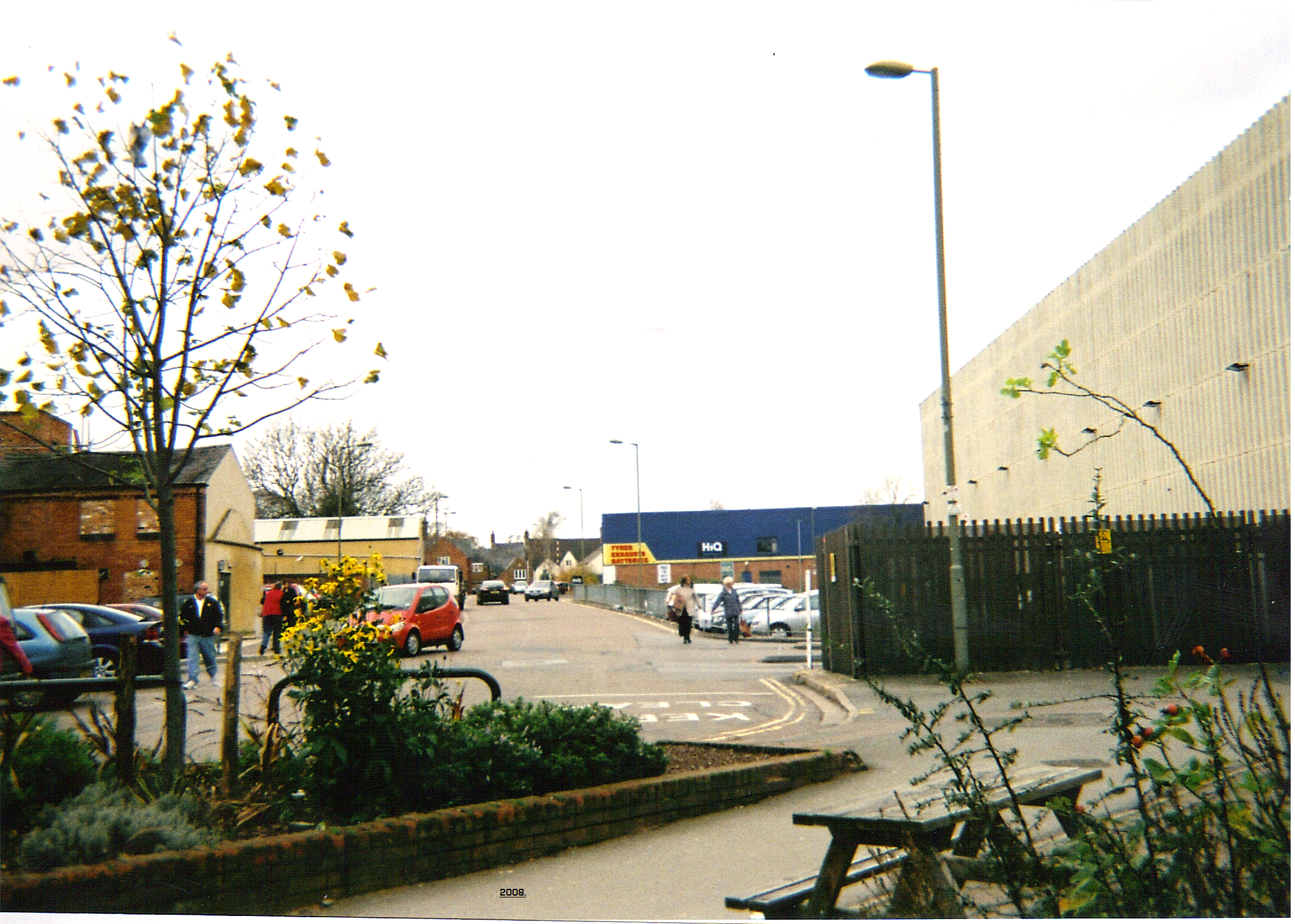
Castle Quay's 1969 car park. The one from 1978 is not shown.

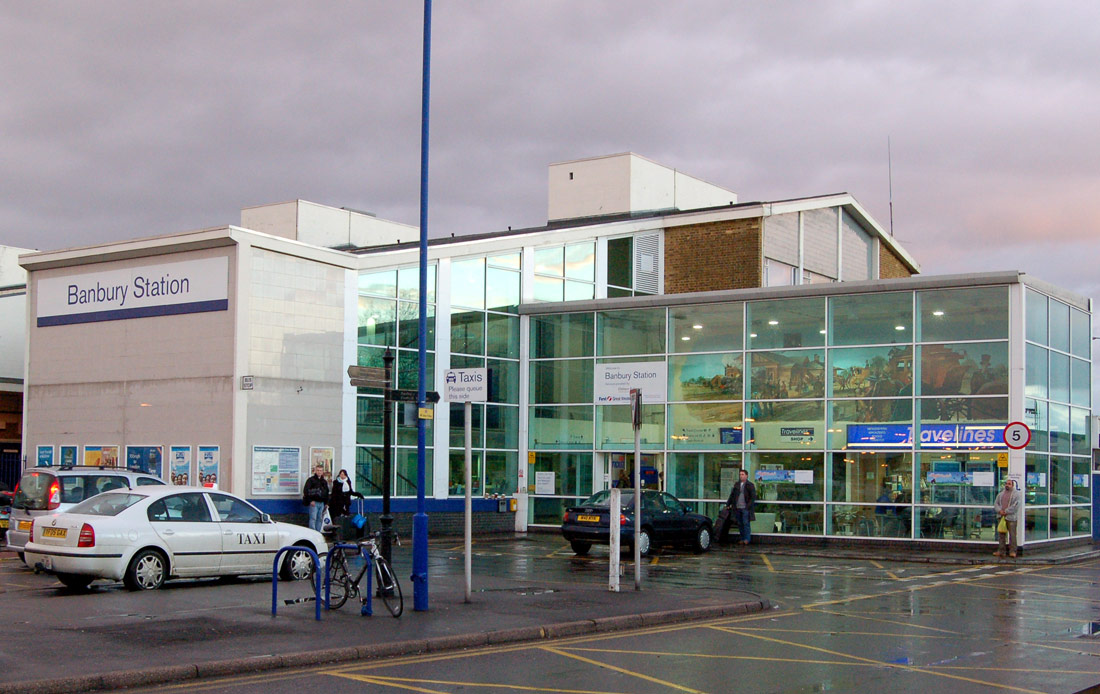
The booking hall and main entrance Banbury railway station, managed by Chiltern Railways.

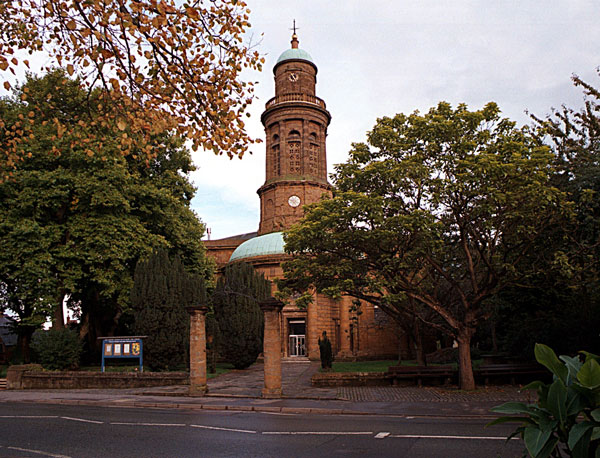
St Mary's Church, Banbury. It was built in the 1790s to replace the Medieval one damaged during the English Civil War.

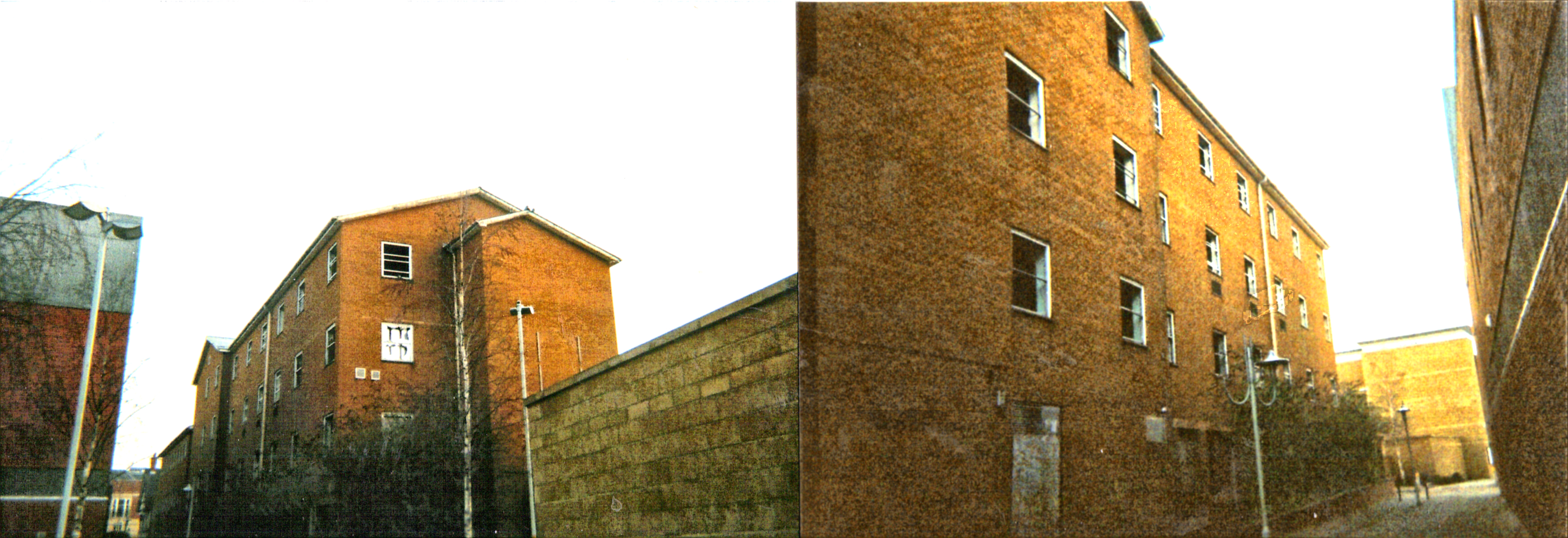
Banbury's former Crest Hotels building has been derelict for a long time.

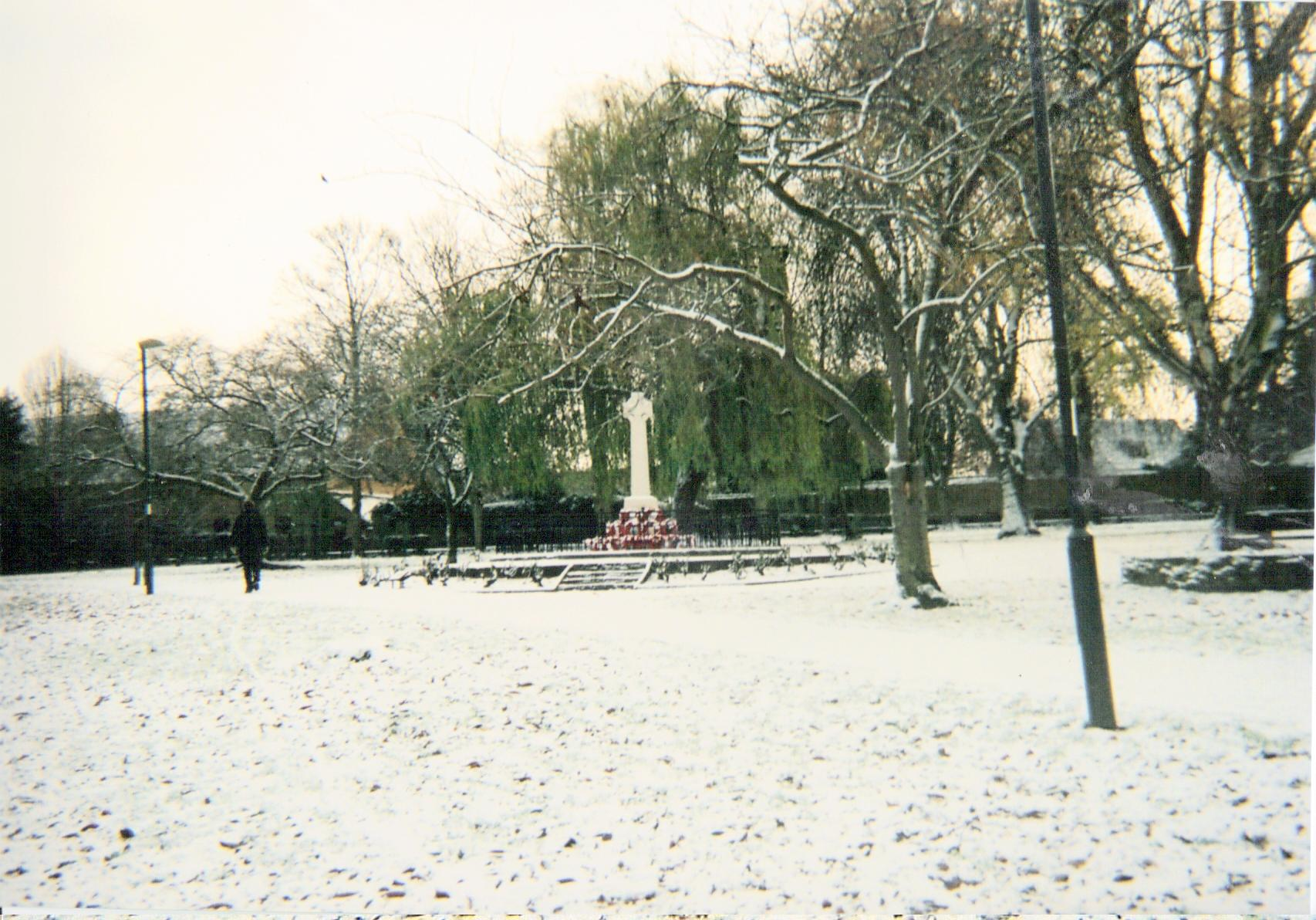
Banbury war memorial in People's park on 29 November 2010.

== Sources ==
- Beeson, C. F. C. (1989) [1962]. Simcock, A. V. (ed.). Clockmaking in Oxfordshire 1400–1850 (3rd ed.). Oxford: Museum of the History of Science. ISBN 0-903364-06-9.
- Compton, Hugh J. (1976). The Oxford Canal. Newton Abbot: David & Charles. ISBN 0-7153-7238-6.
- Colvin, Christina; Cooper, Janet; Cooper, N. H.; Harvey, P. D. A.; Hollings, Marjory; Hook, Judith; Jessup, Mary; Lobel, Mary D.; Mason, J. F. A.; Trinder, B. S.; Turner, Hilary (1972). Crossley, Alan (ed.). A History of the County of Oxford, Volume 10: Banbury Hundred. Victoria County History. ISBN 978-0-19722-728-2.
- Deegan, Alison; Foard, Glenn (2008). Mapping Ancient Landscapes in Northamptonshire. English Heritage. Swindon: Liverpool University Press. ISBN 9781848021693. OCLC 1321804234.
- Lobel, Mary D.; Crossley, Alan, eds. (1969). A History of the County of Oxford, Volume 9: Bloxham Hundred. Victoria County History. pp. 103–123. ISBN 978-0-19722-726-8.
- Pevsner, Nikolaus; Cherry, Bridget (1973) [1961]. Northamptonshire. The Buildings of England. Harmondsworth: Penguin Books. ISBN 0-14-071022-1.
- Sherwood, Jennifer; Pevsner, Nikolaus (1974). Oxfordshire. The Buildings of England. Harmondsworth: Penguin Books. pp. 435–444. ISBN 0-14-071045-0.
