= North Oxfordshire =

- Future unitary authority area
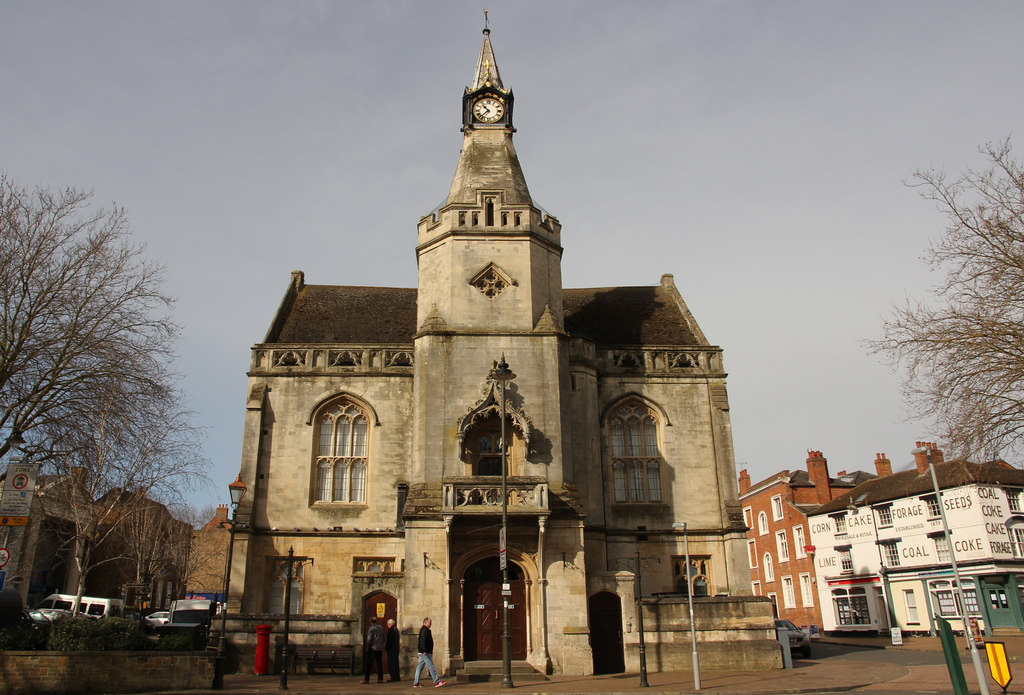
- Banbury Town Hall

- North Oxfordshire within Oxfordshire and Ridgeway
- Interactive map
- Coordinates: 52.0620°N 1.3339°W
- Sovereign state: United Kingdom
- Country: England
- Region: South East
- Ceremonial county: Oxfordshire

Government
  - Type: Unitary authority
  - Body: North Oxfordshire Council

Population (2024 estimate)
  - Total: 265,000
- Time zone: UTC+0 (GMT)
  - Summer (DST): UTC+1 (BST)

North Oxfordshire or Northern Oxfordshire is expected to be a unitary authority area in the ceremonial county of Oxfordshire, England. It was planned to be formed on 1 April 2028, with the first elections planned to take place in May 2027. Plans to create it were halted in September 2026 and the 2027 election was cancelled. In October 2026, it was announced that the first election is expected to take place in 2028 and the unitary authority will be established in 2029.

== Formation ==
It will be formed from the existing Oxfordshire district of West Oxfordshire along with Cherwell less 15 parishes which will form part of Greater Oxford.

It is being formed as part of ongoing local government changes throughout England, in which all areas of the country that have separate county councils and district councils will see those replaced with single-tier, or unitary, local governance. The alternative proposals for a single unitary for Oxfordshire (with leaving West Berkshire as is) and for having two unitaries in Oxfordshire and West Berkshire were not accepted. The whole area is parished.

Decisions were announced in July 2026, with elections planned for May 2027 and the new authorities established in 2028. In September 2026, the Oxfordshire proposals were halted by the government and placed under review. In October 2026, the plans were revived with modifications that do not affect North Oxfordshire. The first election is expected to take place in 2028 and the unitary authority established in 2029, subject to a three week consultation period. Also in October, Oxfordshire County Council initiated legal action against the decision. Oxfordshire County Council reacted to the revised proposal with a threat of further potential legal action.

== Governance ==
It will be run by North Oxfordshire Council, which will comprise 73 councillors.

== Geography ==
Its largest settlement will be Banbury and it will also include Bicester, Burford, Carterton, Charlbury, Chipping Norton, Witney and Woodstock. The area has a 2024 estimated population of 265,000.
