= Ashlar =

Finely dressed stone and associated masonry

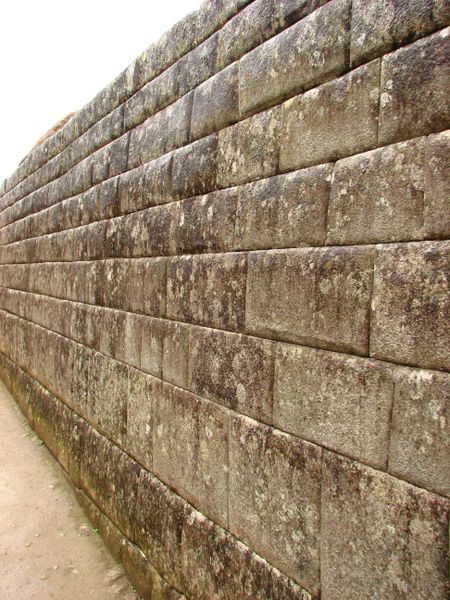
Dry ashlar masonry laid in parallel courses on an Inca wall at Machu Picchu

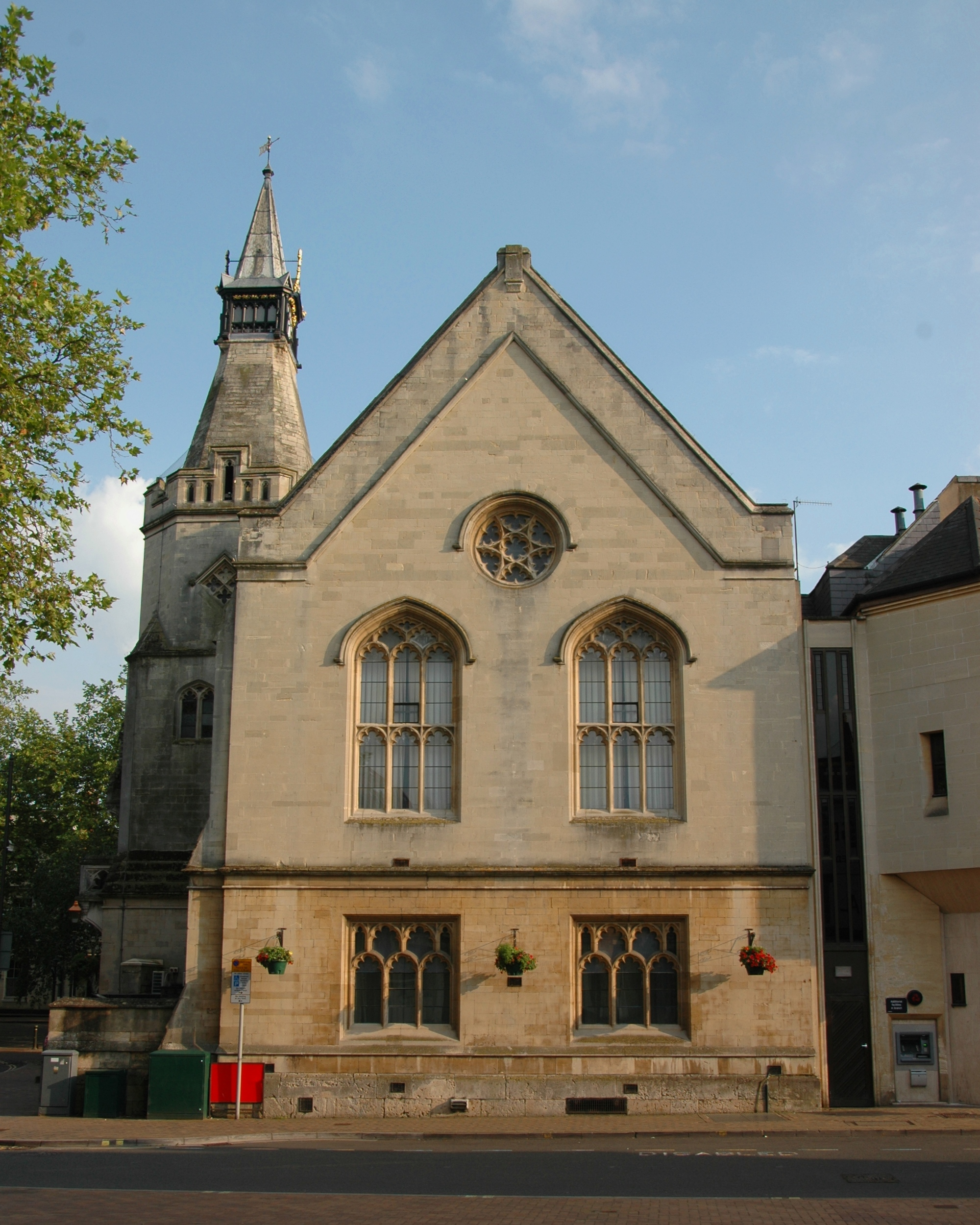
Ashlar masonry north gable of Banbury Town Hall, Oxfordshire

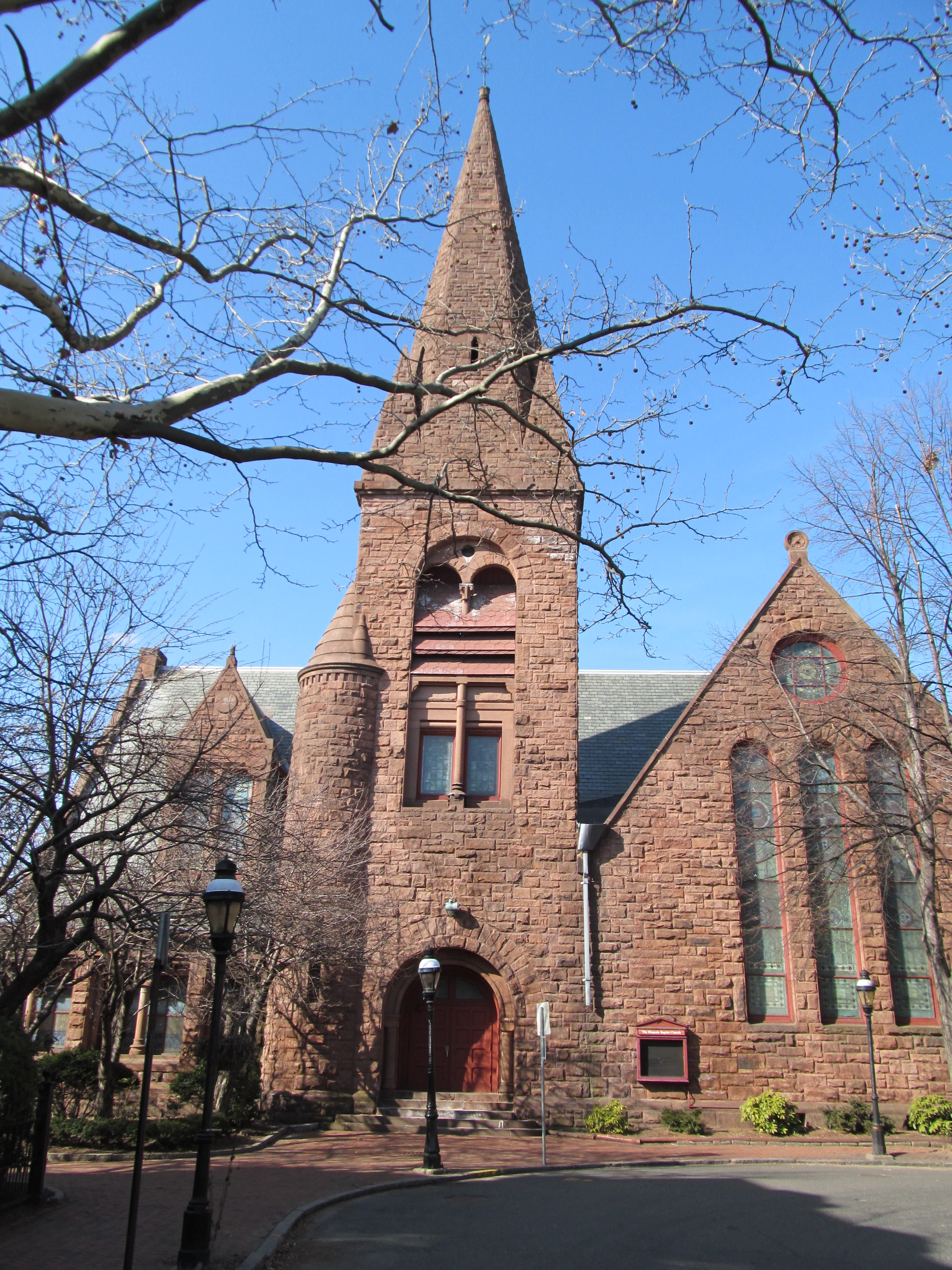
Quarry-faced red Longmeadow sandstone in random ashlar was specified by architect Henry Hobson Richardson for the North Congregational Church (Springfield, Massachusetts, 1871).

Ashlar (/ˈæʃlər/) is cut and dressed stone worked to achieve a specific form, typically rectangular; a structure built from such stones; and the look created by the dressing technique. Ashlar stone may be dry laid or bedded in mortar.

== Description ==
An ashlar block is the finest stone masonry unit, and is generally rectangular. It was described by Vitruvius as opus isodomum, or trapezoidal. Precisely cut "on all faces adjacent to those of other stones", ashlar masonry is capable of requiring only very thin joints between blocks, and the exposed face of the stone may be smoothly polished, quarry-faced, rusticated, or tooled for decorative effect; an example of the latter is "mason's drag", where a metal comb is used to cut small grooves, usually on softer stones.

Ashlar masonry is in contrast to rubble masonry, which employs irregularly shaped stones, such as flat ledge or rounded river or lake stones, sometimes minimally worked or selected for similar size, or both. Ashlar masonry is related but generally distinct from other stone masonry that is finely dressed but not quadrilateral, such as curvilinear and polygonal masonry.

Ashlar masonry may be coursed, with stone blocks laid in continuous horizontal layers. Ashlar may also be random, which involves stone blocks laid with deliberately discontinuous courses, interrupted both vertically and horizontally, as in snecked masonry. In either case it is generally joined with a bonding material such as mortar, although dry laid ashlar construction is found, and metal ties and other methods of assembly have been used. The dry ashlar of Inca architecture in Cusco and Machu Picchu is particularly fine and famous.

== Etymology ==
The word is attested in Middle English and derives from the Old French aisselier, from the Latin axilla, a diminutive of axis, meaning "plank". "Clene hewen ashler" often occurs in medieval documents; this means tooled or finely worked, in contradistinction to rough-axed faces.

In tile carpet installation "ashlar" refers to a vertical 1/2 offset pattern.

== Use ==
Ashlar blocks have been used in the construction of many buildings as an alternative to brick or other materials.

In classical architecture, ashlar wall surfaces were often contrasted with rustication, each employing different chisels and techniques.

The term is frequently used to describe the dressed stone work of prehistoric Greece and Crete, although the dressed blocks are usually much larger than modern ashlar. For example, the tholos tombs of Bronze Age Mycenae use ashlar masonry in the construction of the so-called "beehive" dome. This dome consists of finely cut ashlar blocks that decrease in size and terminate in a central capstone. These domes are not true domes, but are constructed using the corbel arch.

Ashlar masonry was also heavily used in the construction of palace facades on Crete, including Knossos and Phaistos. These constructions date to the MM III-LM Ib period, c. 1700–1450 BC.

In large scale modern European construction ashlar blocks are generally about 35 centimetres (14 in) in height. When shorter than 30 centimetres (12 in), they are usually called small ashlar.

== As metaphor ==
In some Masonic groupings, which such societies term jurisdictions, ashlars are used as a symbolic metaphor for how one's personal development relates to the tenets of their lodge. As described in the explanation of the First Degree Tracing Board, in Emulation and other Masonic rituals the rough ashlar is a stone as taken directly from the quarry, and allegorically represents the Freemason prior to his initiation; a smooth ashlar (or "perfect ashlar") is a stone that has been smoothed and dressed by the experienced stonemason, and allegorically represents the Freemason who, through education and diligence, has learned the lessons of Freemasonry and who lives an upstanding life.

== See also ==
- Ablaq
- Dimension stone
- Opus quadratum
- Stone veneer
