= Crouch Hill, Banbury =

Hill in Banbury, Oxfordshire, England

Coordinates: 52°03′00″N 1°21′35″W

Crouch Hill (from Celtic crug, meaning "hill") is a partly artificial hill one mile to the south-west of Banbury Church in Banbury, Oxfordshire, in the United Kingdom. The top of the hill, which is a cone in shape, is the artificial part, as examined by antiquarian digs in the 19th century. Alfred Beesley concluded that the purpose of the hill was thus to form a signalling platform with other Saxon encampments in the area, given that it afforded a view above most of Banbury to settlements such as Rainsborough and Arberry Hill (both in Northamptonshire).

At the foot of Crouch Hill used to run Banbury Lane, a road that followed the route of an old trackway passing Rollrich and Tadmarton through Banbury to Northampton. Crossing it used to be a road named Saltway, which actually was a salt way, proceeding to the south-west in the direction of Oxford and London. It was around the junction of these two roads that Banbury town actually grew in the first place.

Crouch Hill was used as an encampment by William Waller in 1644 during the siege of Banbury Castle. Crouch Hill (Rusher 1789), a poem by Philip Rusher who was a resident of the Town in the 18th and 19th centuries, recounts the view from Crouch Hill of the churches in the town:

But see where o'er the rest wilth nobler blaze
Its eight crown'd turrets Banbury displays
Upon its hallow'd walls and wide around,
Thick rising structures occupy the ground.
Behold how Phoebus with his early lights
Shines on the battlements and builded heights.
