= Wood Green (disambiguation) =

Wood Green is a district of North London, England.

Wood Green or Woodgreen may also refer to:

== Places ==
=== England ===
- Wood Green, Essex; See List of United Kingdom locations: Wir-Wood
- Wood Green, Norfolk; See List of United Kingdom locations: Wir-Wood
- Wood Green, West Midlands
- Wood Green, Worcestershire; See List of United Kingdom locations: Wir-Wood
- Woodgreen, Hampshire

=== Canada ===
- Woodgreen, Ontario

== Schools ==
- Wood Green Academy, a coeducational secondary school in Wednesbury, West Midlands, England
- Wood Green School, a coeducational secondary school near Witney, Oxfordshire, England

== Transport ==
- Wood Green bus garage, bus terminus in Wood Green, London, operated by Arriva London
- Wood Green tube station, underground railway station in Wood Green, London
- Wood Green (Old Bescot) railway station, a railway station that served the Wood Green area of the West Midlands from 1837 to 1941

== Other uses ==
- Wood Green (electoral division), former Greater London Council electoral division, 1973—1986
- Wood Green (UK Parliament constituency), former constituency for the House of Commons of the UK Parliament, 1918—1983
- Wood Green Quarry & Railway Cutting, a geological Site of Special Scientific Interest in Gloucestershire
- Wood Green Town F.C., former football club in Tottenham, London, England
- Woodgreen Conservation Reserve, Northern Territory, Australia
- Woodgreen Lido, an open-air swimming pool in Banbury, Herefordshire, England
- Woodgreen Pets Charity, an English charity
- Woodgreen Station, also spelt Wood Green, a cattle station in Northern Territory, Australia
