= Neil Cossons =

British historian and museum administrator (1939–2026)

Sir Neil Cossons OBE FSA FMA
- Born: 15 January 1939; Beeston, Nottinghamshire, England
- Died: 29 March 2026 (aged 87)
- Occupations: Historian; museum administrator

Academic background
- Education: University of Liverpool

Academic work
- Discipline: Industrial archaeology Geography
- Institutions: Ironbridge Gorge Museum Trust; National Maritime Museum, Greenwich; Science Museum, London; English Heritage

Sir Neil Cossons OBE FSA FMA (15 January 1939 – 29 March 2026) was a British historian and museum administrator. He held senior museum and heritage roles during a long career and advised on conservation and public understanding of science.

== Life and career ==
Cossons was born in Beeston on 15 January 1939. He studied at the University of Liverpool.

He was the first director of the Ironbridge Gorge Museum Trust from 1971 and then at the National Maritime Museum, Greenwich from 1983. From 1986 to 2000, he was the director of the Science Museum, London, and was awarded a Science Museum Fellowship in 2019. From 1989 to 1995, and 1999 to 2000, he was an English Heritage commissioner. He was pro-provost and chairman of council at the Royal College of Art from 2007 until 2015. In 2000, he took over as chairman of English Heritage, a post he held until 2007.

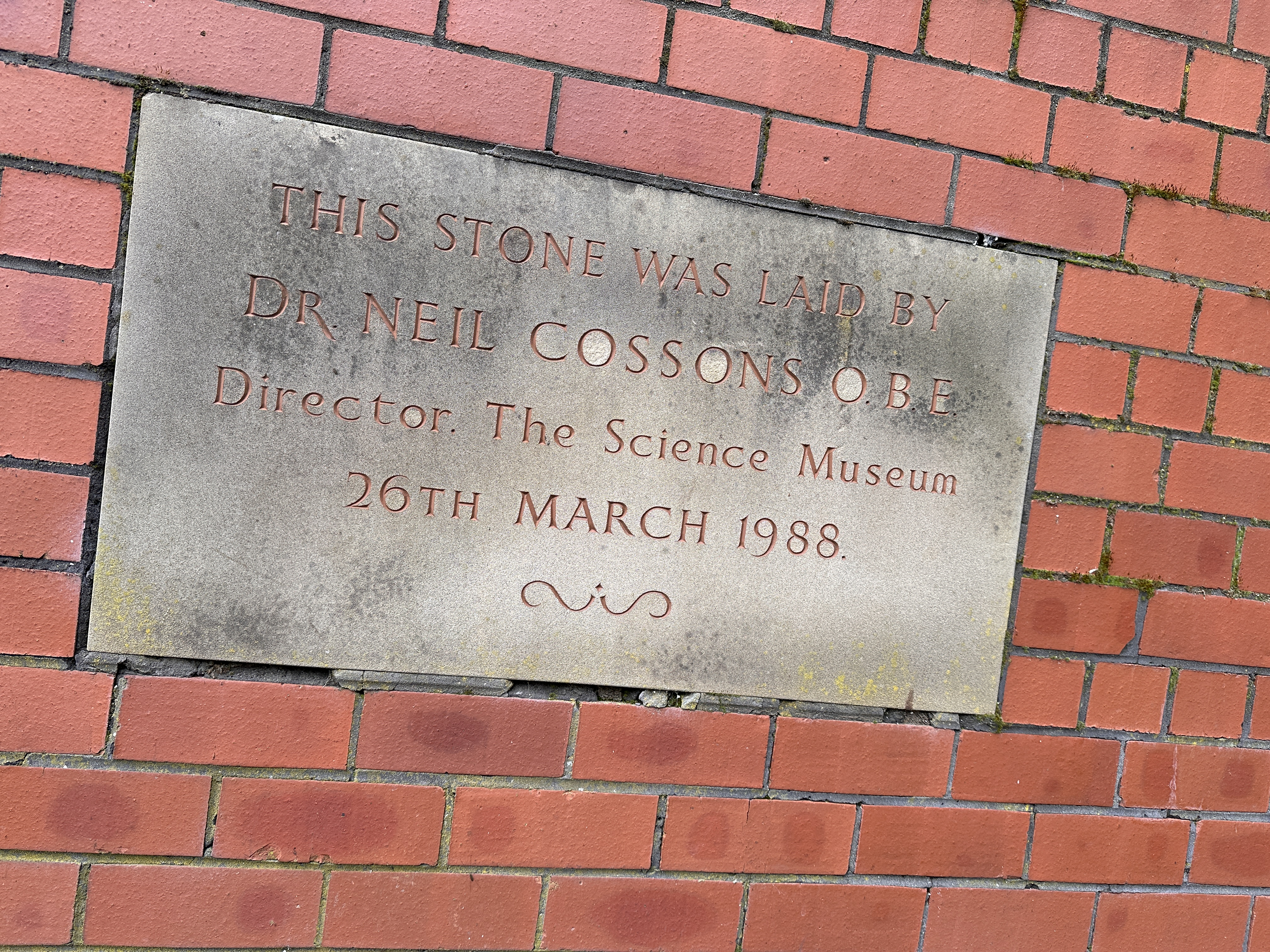
Stone laid by Neil Cossons, National Tramway Museum, 26 March 1988

Cossons was one of the founders of the Association of Independent Museums (AIM) and its chairman from 1978 to 1983, when he was appointed president. Cossons was appointed an Officer of the Order of the British Empire (OBE) in the 1982 Birthday Honours and knighted for services to museums and heritage in 1994. He was a Fellow of the Museums Association (FMA 1970) and a Life Fellow of the Society of Antiquaries of London (FSA 1968). A member of the Newcomen Society for the history of engineering and technology since 1963, Cossons was president from 2001 to 2003 and was awarded the society's Dickinson Memorial Medal in 2001. In 2016, he was appointed a Trustee of the National Heritage Memorial Fund/Heritage Lottery Fund.

Other appointments included: president of the Association for Industrial Archaeology (1977–80); member of the Design Council (1990–94); non-executive director of British Waterways Board (1995–2001); Collier Professor in the Public Understanding of Science in the University of Bristol (2001–02); president of the Royal Geographical Society (2003–2006) He has been an honorary professor at the University of Birmingham since 1994. Cossons held honorary doctorates from fourteen British universities, was awarded the President's Medal of the Royal Academy of Engineering in 1993, and appointed an honorary fellow of the RIBA in 2002.

Cossons was described as "Britain's leading authority on the industrial heritage" and advised on matters of conservation and management widely in the UK and overseas.

In 1997, he received an honorary doctorate from the University of Bath.

Cossons died on 29 March 2026, at the age of 87.

== Honours ==
Order of the Rising Sun, Gold Rays and Neck Ribbon (2023).

== Publications ==
- Buchanan, R. A.; Cossons, Neil (1969). Industrial Archaeology of the Bristol Region. Industrial Archaeology of British Isles. David & Charles. ISBN 0715343947.
- Buchanan, R. A.; Cossons, Neil (1970). Bristol. Industrial History in Pictures. David & Charles. ISBN 0715347454.
- Cossons, Neil (1975). BP Book of Industrial Archaeology. David & Charles. ISBN 071536250X.
- Cossons, Neil; Sowden, Harry (1977). Ironbridge: Landscape of Industry. Cassell. ISBN 0-304-29693-7.
- Cossons, Neil; Trinder, Barrie (1979). The Iron Bridge. Moonraker Press. ISBN 0239-00187-7.

Cultural offices
Preceded by Dame Margaret Weston	Director of the Science Museum; 1986–2000	Succeeded by Dr Lindsay Sharp
