= Banbury Cake (newspaper) =

English free newspaper

- Type: Online newspaper
- Owner: Newsquest
- Publisher: Newsquest
- Editor: Sara Taylor
- Language: English
- Headquarters: Newspaper House, Osney Mead, OXFORD, OX2 0EJ
- Website: banburycake.co.uk

The Banbury Cake was a free, weekly, newspaper published by Newsquest Oxfordshire, Oxford, England. It was distributed to houses in Banbury and the surrounding area, usually on a Thursday. It contained local news, sport, entertainment news, gossip; as well as job, car and other advertisements. It takes its name from Banbury cakes.

== Current formation and future ==
In October 2017, The Oxford Times announced the cessation of the Banbury Cake after more than forty years of publication but would publish news via its website. Banbury Cake now redirects to Oxford Mail. The paper had distributed copies with a circulation of 53,000 in the 1980s. That figure dropped to a print distribution of just over 13,000 copies by 2013.
