= Castle Quay Shopping Centre =

Shopping centre in Oxfordshire, England

Coordinates: 52.0625°N 1.3337°W

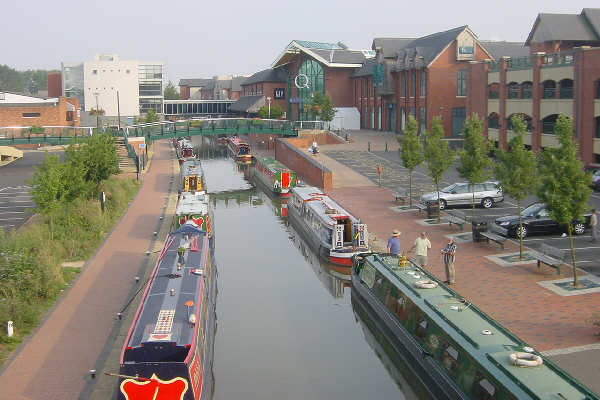
The modern Castle Quay Shopping Centre alongside the Oxford Canal, with Banbury Museum in the background

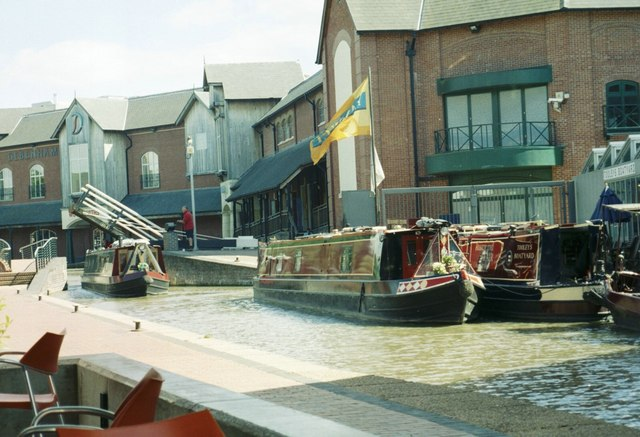
View of Castle Quay Shopping Centre with the Oxford Canal in the foreground from the Banbury Museum cafe

Castle Quay Shopping Centre is a shopping centre in the town of Banbury, North Oxfordshire, England.

The shopping centre is located in the centre of Banbury by the Oxford Canal, off Castle Street. Banbury Museum and Tooley's Boatyard are also located here. Close by is Spiceball Park. The museum is accessible over a bridge and from the Castle Quay Shopping Centre. There are 5 entrances here; one at Bridge Street, two at Market Place, and two next to the Oxford Canal.

Castle Quay Shopping Centre has over a hundred stores. Major shops (anchor stores) include Boots and W H Smith.

A stone plaque in the facade of the Corn Exchange in the Market Place commemorates the start, in 1974, of the Castle Centre, by Banbury Borough Council.

In spring 2022, Castle Quay Waterfront (previously named Castle Quay 2) was fully opened, consisting of Pizza Express, Nando's, a 7 screen branch of The Light Cinema, a bowling alley and an arcade, as well as a rock climbing facility named "Adventure Climb". Across the canal was also a modern Premier Inn hotel, and a new Lidl supermarket.

== See also ==
- List of shopping centres in the United Kingdom
