= Tooley's Boatyard =

Oldest continuously working dry dock in Great Britain

Coordinates: 52.0636°N 1.3335°W

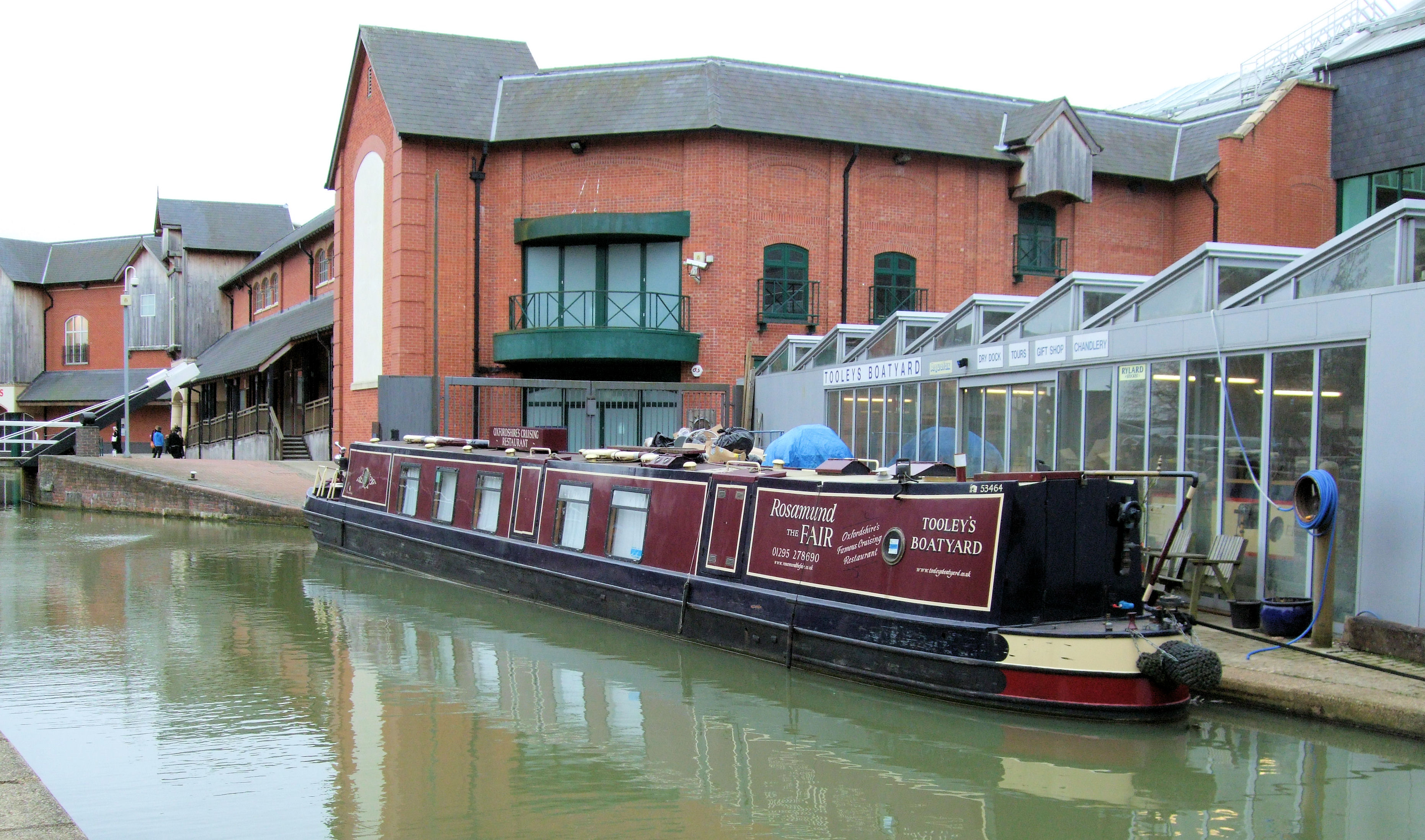
Tooley's Boatyard on the Oxford Canal in Banbury.

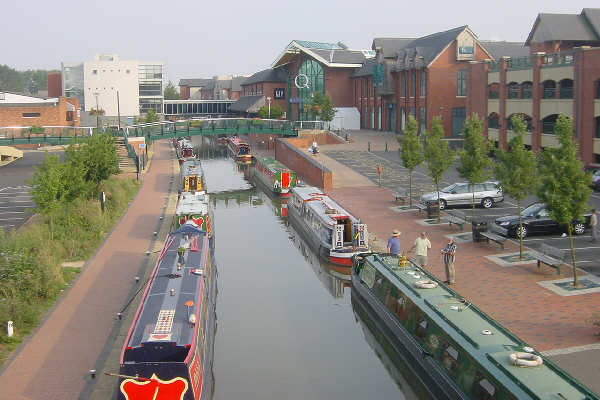
The modern Castle Quay Shopping Centre alongside the Oxford Canal, with Banbury Museum in the background.

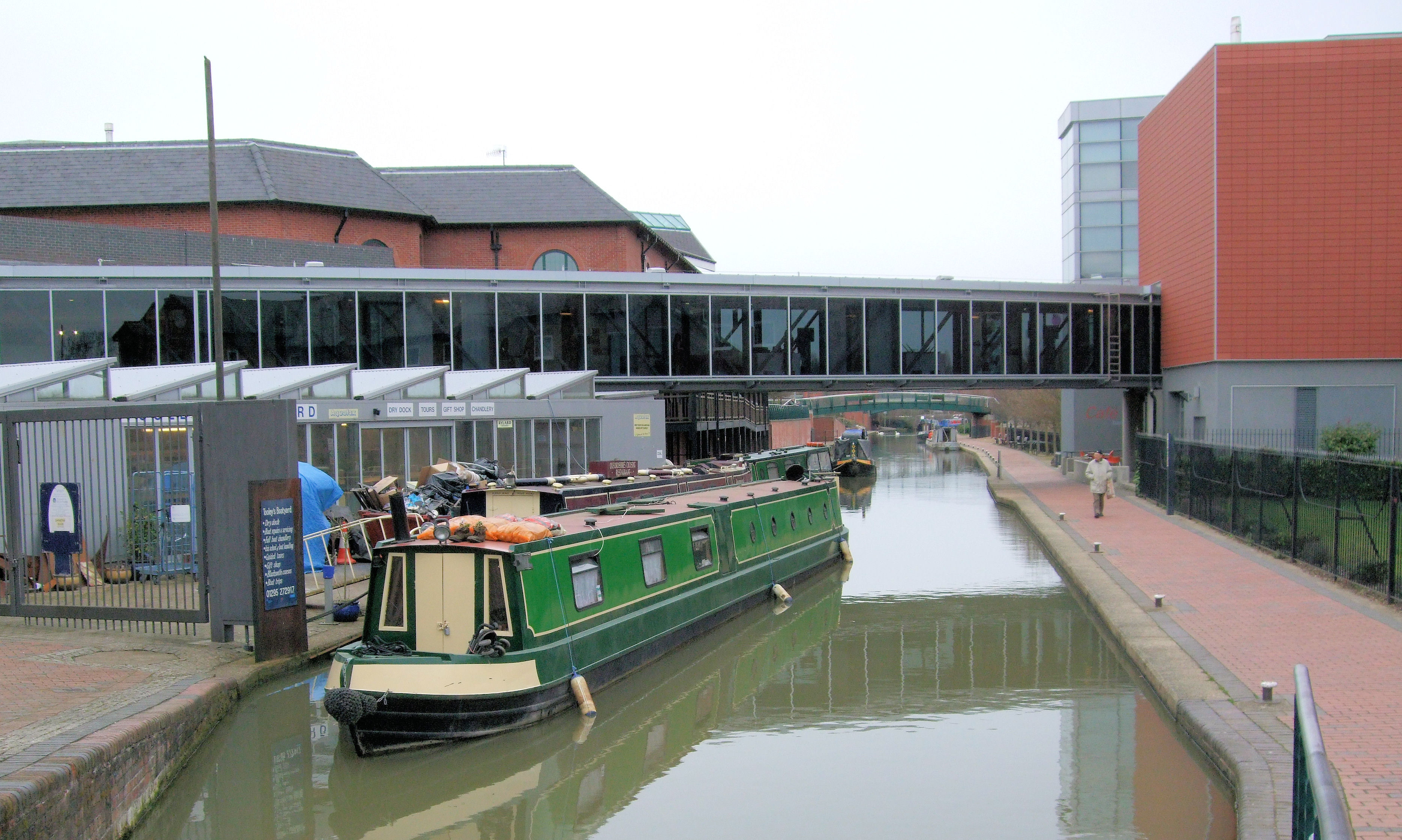
The Oxford Canal at Tooley's Boatyard, Banbury.

Tooley's Boatyard is a dockyard on the Oxford Canal in the centre of the town of Banbury, Oxfordshire, England.

The opening of the Oxford Canal from Hawkesbury Junction to Banbury on 30 March 1778 gave the town a cheap and reliable supply of Warwickshire coal. In 1787, the Oxford Canal was extended southwards, finally opening to Oxford on 1 January 1790. The canal's main boat yard in Banbury was the original outlay of today's facility at Tooley's Boatyard, which is an officially listed cultural site.

Prior to the arrival of James Brindley's Oxford Canal in 1779, the canal-side area comprised an undeveloped, low-lying water meadows. The canal was then extended to Oxford by Banbury's engineer, John Barnes in 1790. Both Parker's Wharf and Bridge Wharf were serviced by fly-boats to many distant cross-country destinations and by market boats to Oxford and Coventry. The canal brought much growth and prosperity to Banbury over the years and is still popular with boat users today.

Tooley's is the oldest continuous working dry dock in Britain and was established to build and repair the wooden horse-drawn narrow boats which regularly travelled up and down the newly constructed Oxford Canal network. This is why it was so vital to the development of the Industrial Revolution in Banbury. Over the years road haulage and the railways eroded away the importance of the canals, although they regained their local importance during the Second World War.

Tooley's was lately immortalised in Tom Rolt's popular 1944 book Narrow boat, which was re-released in the 1990s when the boatyard's future was threatened. The yard kept on working up until 1995, and is a scheduled monument and run by a private company in trust. Its fully restored workshops date from the 1930s and include a carpenter's store, a steam-powered belt-driven machine workshop, a paint store and a 200-year-old forge where a blacksmith pursues their trade. A blue plaque to Mr Rolt was unveiled at Tooley's Boatyard, Banbury on 7 August 2010 as part of the centenary celebrations of his birth.

== See also ==
- Canals of Great Britain
- History of the British canal system
- Banburyshire
- History of Banbury, Oxfordshire
- Banbury Museum
