= Banbury Music Radio =

Coordinates: 52°21′17″N 1°39′07″W

Banbury Music Radio was a local Internet radio station in Banbury, Oxfordshire, England that showcased bands from all around Oxfordshire, Berkshire, and other local areas.

== History ==
In November 2007, the station's website gave its address as BMR, Frampton House, 26 Horse Fair, Banbury, Oxon, OX16 0AE.

By 2010, it had adopted the name Banbury Internet Radio at the Internet domain www.banburyinternetradio.com In May 2014, the Banbury Internet Radio page said, "Banbury Internet Radio is currently off-air".

In early May 2014, the domain www.banburymusicradio.com existed, but the connection to the earlier radio station was not clear.
