= Chris Hughes (hypnotist) =

British hypnotist

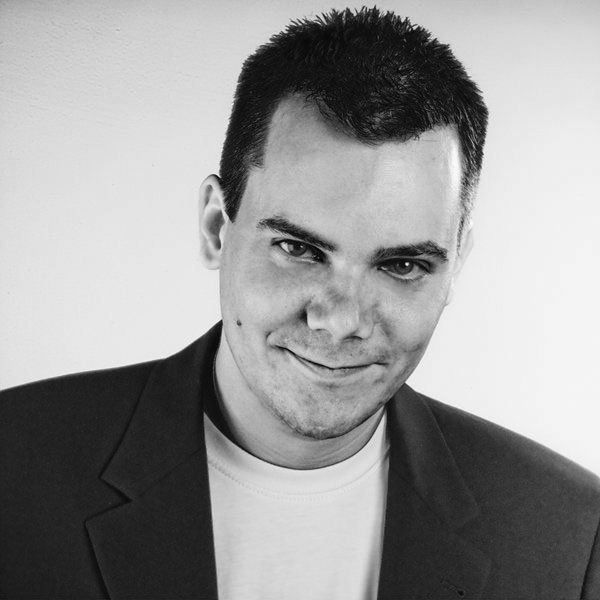
- Born: Christopher Andrew Hughes; 18 April 1975 (age 49); Banbury, Oxfordshire, England, United Kingdom
- Occupation(s): Hypnotist, Mentalist
- Years active: 2004–present
- Website: www.chrishugheshypnotherapy.co.uk

Chris Hughes (born 18 April 1975) is a British born TV hypnotist, hypnotherapist, speaker, and entertainer. He attempted to set a world record for the biggest online hypnosis event. The Socialtrance live event was exclusively for users of Facebook and Twitter and attracted over 1,000,000 listeners from over 130 countries.

He featured and appeared on BBC One, BBC Three, ITV, Sky Living, CNN Türk, BBC Radio 2, BBC Radio 5 Live and Talksport with Ian Collins. In the same year on 31 May, over 13,500 people took part in the Socialtrance Stop Smoking Session for World No Tobacco Day once again for users of Facebook and Twitter.

On World Hypnotism Day, 4 January 2011, Socialtrance returned with a weight loss session for charity which over 30,000 people attended. The live 30 minute hypnosis webcast was designed to modify the eating habits of all participants. At the end of the session a weight loss MP3 was released on iTunes and all other major music sites and raised over 10k for Diabetes UK.

In September 2011 Hughes appeared on Sky Living's Slave to Food with Steps singer Claire Richards. During the first episode Hughes is seen hypnotising Claire and trying to help change her relationship with food.

== Publishing career ==
Hughes has produced a range of self-help hypnosis based recordings including:

ASIN B003MIWMZS, Socialtrance – The Stop Smoking Session (2010-05-31) ASIN B004IDKF46, Socialtrance – The Weight Loss Session (2011-01-04)

== See also ==
- Hypnotherapy
