= Banbury Museum =

Museum in Banbury, England

Coordinates: 52.0638°N 1.3334°W

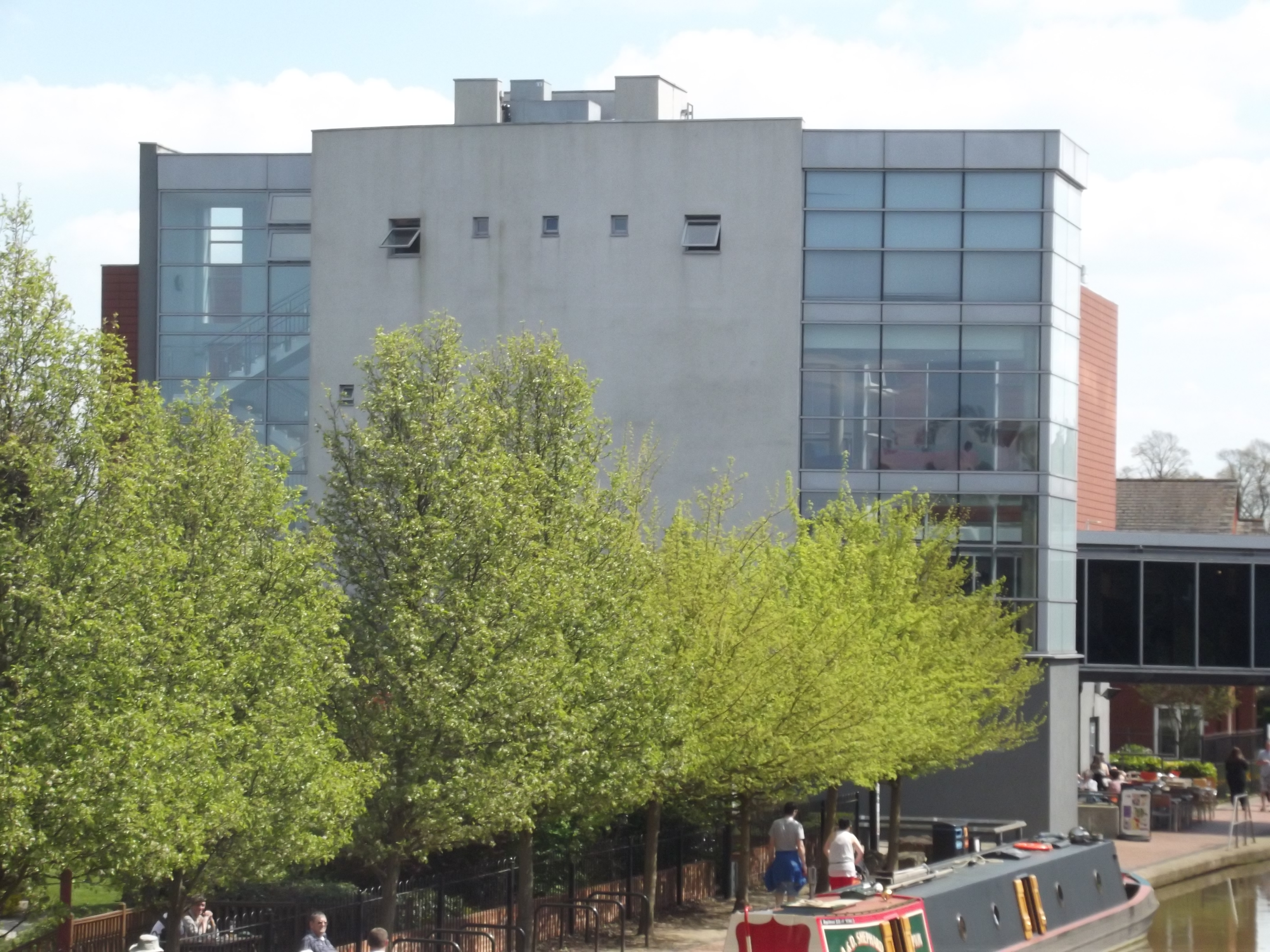
Banbury Museum

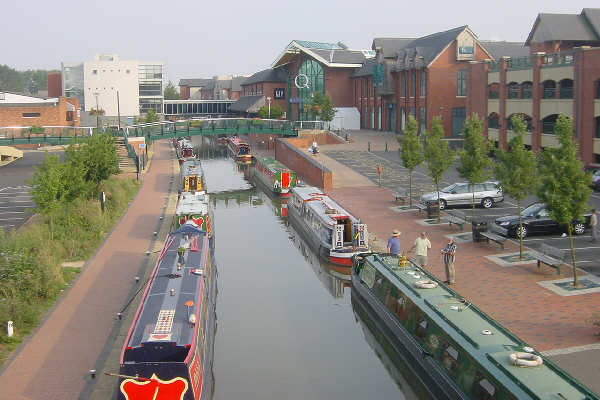
View of the Oxford Canal and Castle Quay Shopping Centre, with Banbury Museum in the background.

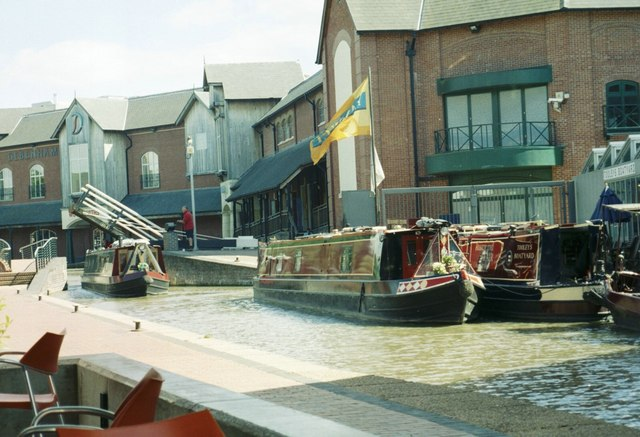
View from the museum cafe of the Oxford Canal and the Castle Quay Shopping Centre.

Banbury Museum & Gallery is a local museum in the town of Banbury, north Oxfordshire, England. It displays exhibits on the history of the town.

== Background ==
The museum is located in the centre of Banbury by the Oxford Canal. Its displays the history of the town. This includes exhibits on the English Civil War, Banbury as a market town in Victorian times, the Oxford Canal, and Tooley's Boatyard next to the museum. The boatyard is a scheduled ancient monument that can be visited on a guided tour. The museum's collections also include 17th century costumes. The museum is also home to the Rosemarie Higham Library, which opened in 2022 after being refurbished. It houses around 1000 books relating to the history of Banbury, and is managed by the Banbury Historical Society.

Banbury Museum & Gallery is run by the Banbury Museum Trust. A museum was founded in Banbury in the 1940s, with the collection originally being housed in the town's library. Following this, the collection moved to Banbury Cross, where it was housed between 1980 and 1999. Today, the museum is housed in a purpose built building near Spiceball Park. An architectural design competition was launched by Cherwell District Council and RIBA Competitions to design the new Museum building. The Competition was won by ECD Architects of London and the new building opened in 2002. It is accessible over a bridge from the Castle Quay Shopping Centre or via Spiceball Park Road. The town's tourist information centre is located in the museum entrance in the Castle Quay Shopping Centre.

== See also ==
- List of museums in Oxfordshire
- History of Banbury, Oxfordshire
- Museum of Oxford
