= Quarry-faced stone =

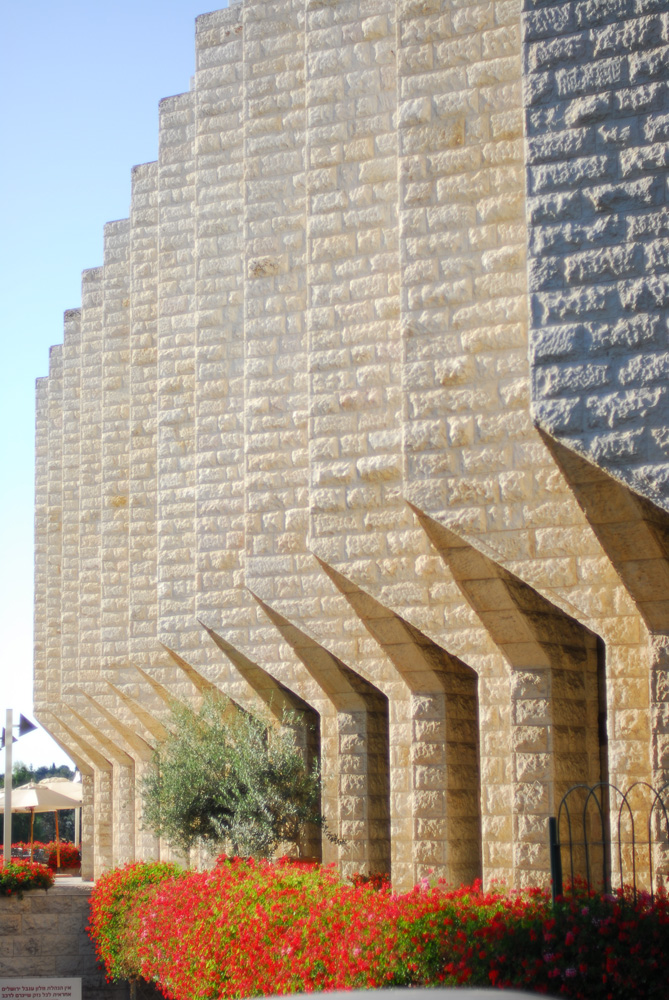
Quarry-faced stone on the Inbal Jerusalem Hotel

Quarry-faced stone is a stone with a rough, unpolished surface, straight from the quarry.
