= Barrie Trinder =

British historian (born 1939)

Barrie Trinder FSA
- Born: 1939 (age 86–87); Banbury, Oxfordshire, England
- Occupations: Historian and author

Academic background
- Education: University of Leicester
- Thesis: "The social and economic history of Banbury between 1830 and 1880" (1980)

Academic work
- Discipline: History
- Sub-discipline: Local history and industrial archaeology
- Notable works: The Making of the Industrial Landscape (1982); The Blackwell Encyclopedia of Industrial Archaeology (1992) (Editor)

Barrie Stuart Trinder FSA (born 1939) is a British historian and writer on industrial archaeology. After a career in teaching, he took a PhD at the University of Leicester, graduating in 1980 with a thesis on the history of Banbury. He then became a research fellow at the Ironbridge Institute, and later lectured on industrial archaeology at Nene College of Higher Education in Northampton. He was a founder member of The International Committee for the Conservation of the Industrial Heritage (TICCIH). He has written and edited on the history of Banbury, on Shropshire, and on the industrial archaeology and industrial history of Britain generally. He edited The Blackwell Encyclopedia of Industrial Archaeology (1992). He was made a fellow of the Society of Antiquaries of London in 2000.

== Early life ==
Barrie Trinder was born in Banbury, Oxfordshire, in 1939. He read modern history at St Catherine's College, University of Oxford.

== Career ==
Trinder's early career was in teaching, after which he earned his PhD from the University of Leicester in 1980 for a thesis titled "The social and economic history of Banbury between 1830 and 1880." In the 1980s he was senior research fellow at the Ironbridge Institute, organised jointly by the University of Birmingham and the Ironbridge Gorge Museum Trust, and subsequently became a lecturer in industrial archaeology at Nene College of Higher Education, Northampton. He was a founder member of The International Committee for the Conservation of the Industrial Heritage (TICCIH) and has been described as "elevating industrial archaeology (IA) to the status of a respected academic discipline from what had been previously regarded by some as the purview of eccentric hobbyists."

His first books were on the industrial archaeology and history of Shropshire and its Iron Bridge. In the 1980s he wrote about his native Banbury in Victorian Banbury (1982), more on the history of Shropshire, and began to write more widely about British history with The Making of the Industrial Landscape (1982) and Industrial Heritage of Britain (1988). Asa Briggs in The Literary Review described Trinder's survey of the industrial landscape as breaking much new ground and in seeking to recreate in the imagination the conditions of the Industrial Revolution, setting out the manifesto of what might be called the Coalbrookdale School of historians which contrasted with the Leicester School. In The Industrial Archaeology of Shropshire (1996), Trinder took what he described as a "landscape approach" which looked at the wider impact of industrial development to include small towns, rural areas, and workers' housing rather than just describing large industrial sites which had already been well studied. R. Angus Buchanan, however, in Technology and Culture, did not find this approach entirely successful, feeling that the different industries that comprise industrial archaeology kept reasserting their separateness and compromised the attempt to tell an integrated story focussed around the landscape. In 1997, Trinder produced another general work, Book of Industrial England.

In the 2000s he wrote a number of works with a narrow geographic focus as well as the more general Britain’s Industrial Revolution: The making of a manufacturing people, 1700–1870 (2013) and Twentieth Century Industrial Archaeology (2016) with Michael Stratton. In Britain’s Industrial Revolution, Trinder's stated focus was on people, but the book nonetheless devoted lengthy sections to particular industries such as coal mining (87 pages) and textiles (80 pages).

His major edited work is The Blackwell Encyclopedia of Industrial Archaeology (1992). Larry McNally of National Archives of Canada felt the book of 964 pages generally succeeded in covering the area but there were deficiencies such as the rather short articles on industrial processes and materials of "Foundry" and "Iron". There were also geographic omissions with no articles at all covering Central or South America, the Pacific Rim, Asia or Africa, although Australia and New Zealand were represented. McNally attributed the gaps to the fact that the industrial history of those areas had yet to be written. Dianne Newell in The Canadian Historical Review also noted geographical gaps, particularly Japan, but also that some country entries were written in Britain by Trinder and his colleagues and not by experts from the subject countries. There was also the question of the different approaches taken to the developing subject internationally, with greater weight given to archaeology in some and more to architecture elsewhere, while other countries integrated the subject into local studies and museums, and others were concerned with rehabilitating sites. The overall result was patchy and of uneven quality with too many avoidable errors and too many articles written by Trinder despite the claimed numerous international contributors.

Trinder was appointed a fellow of the Society of Antiquaries of London in May 2000.

== Selected publications ==
=== Articles ===
- "Industrial Archaeology in Britain", Archaeology, Vol. 34, No. 1 (January/February 1981), pp. 8–16.

=== Books authored ===
==== 1970s ====
- The Industrial Revolution in Shropshire. Phillimore & Co., London, 1973. ISBN 0900592702
- The Darbys of Coalbrookdale. Phillimore & Co., Chichester, 1974. ISBN 0850333059
- The Hay Inclined Plane: How tub boats were raised and lowered between the Shropshire Canal and Coalport Basin. Ironbridge Gorge Museum Trust, 1978.
- The Iron Bridge: Symbol of the Industrial Revolution. Moonraker Press, Bradford-on-Avon, 1979. (With Neil Cossons) ISBN 0239001877

==== 1980s ====
- The Making of the Industrial Landscape. J.M. Dent, London, 1982. ISBN 0460044273
- Victorian Banbury. Phillimore & Co., 1982. ISBN 9780850334333
- A History of Shropshire. Phillimore & Co., 1983. ISBN 9780850334753
- Industrial Heritage of Britain. Automobile Association, 1988. ISBN 086145684X

==== 1990s ====
- The Industrial Archaeology of Shropshire. Phillimore & Co., Chichester, 1996. ISBN 0850339898
- Book of Industrial England. Batsford & English Heritage, London, 1997. (With Michael Stratton) ISBN 0713475633

==== 2000s ====
- Barges and Bargemen: A social history of the Upper Severn Navigation 1660–1900. Phillimore & Co., 2008. ISBN 9781860773617
- Beyond the Bridges: The suburbs of Shrewsbury 1760–1960. Phillimore & Co., 2008. ISBN 9781860773938
- Britain’s Industrial Revolution: The making of a manufacturing people, 1700–1870. Carnegie Publishing, 2013. ISBN 9781859361757
- Twentieth Century Industrial Archaeology. Taylor & Francis, 2016. (With Michael Stratton) ISBN 9781138140516
- Junctions at Banbury: A town and its railways since 1850. Banbury Historical Society & Lamplight Publications, Banbury, 2017. ISBN 9781899246618
- Georgian Banbury. Banbury Historical Society / Robert Boyd Publications, Banbury, 2023. ISBN 9780900129377

=== Books edited ===
- "The Most Extraordinary District in the World": Ironbridge and Coalbrookdale. Phillimore & Co., 1977. ISBN 9780850332445
- Yeomen and Colliers in Telford: Probate inventories for Dawley, Lilleshall, Wellington and Wrockwardine, 1660–1750. Phillimore & Co., London, 1980. (With Jeff Cox) ISBN 0850333822
- Victorian Shrewsbury: Studies in the history of a county town. Victorian Shrewsbury Research Group, Shropshire Books, 1984. ISBN 9780903802307
- The Blackwell Encyclopedia of Industrial Archaeology. Blackwell Publishing, 1992. ISBN 0631142169
