= Banbury =

Market town in Oxfordshire, England

Coordinates: 52.061°N 1.336°W

- Market town
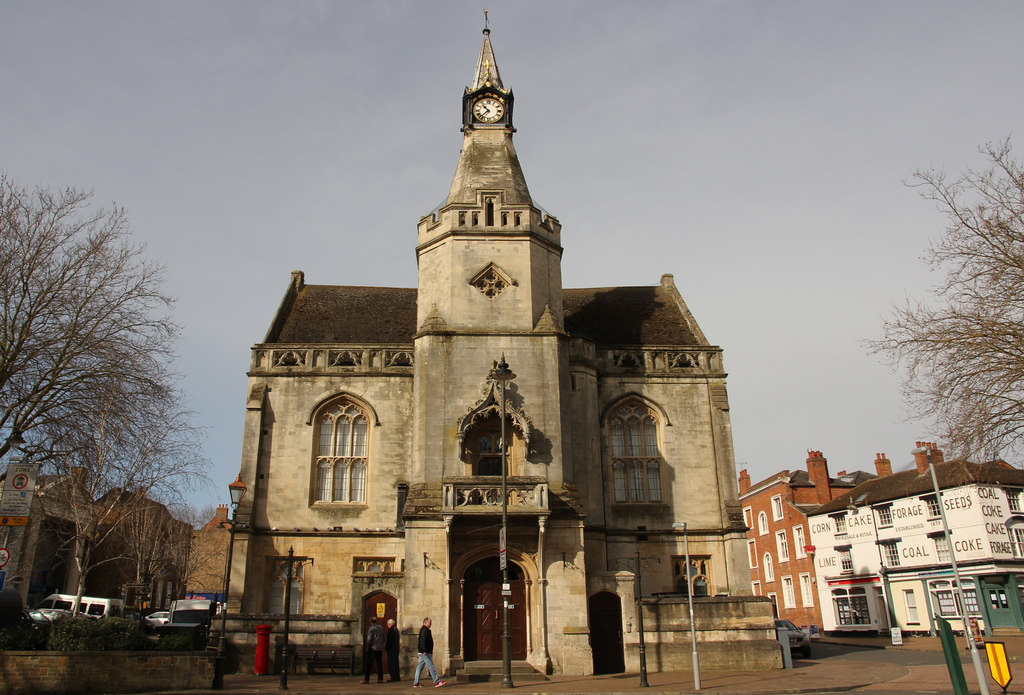
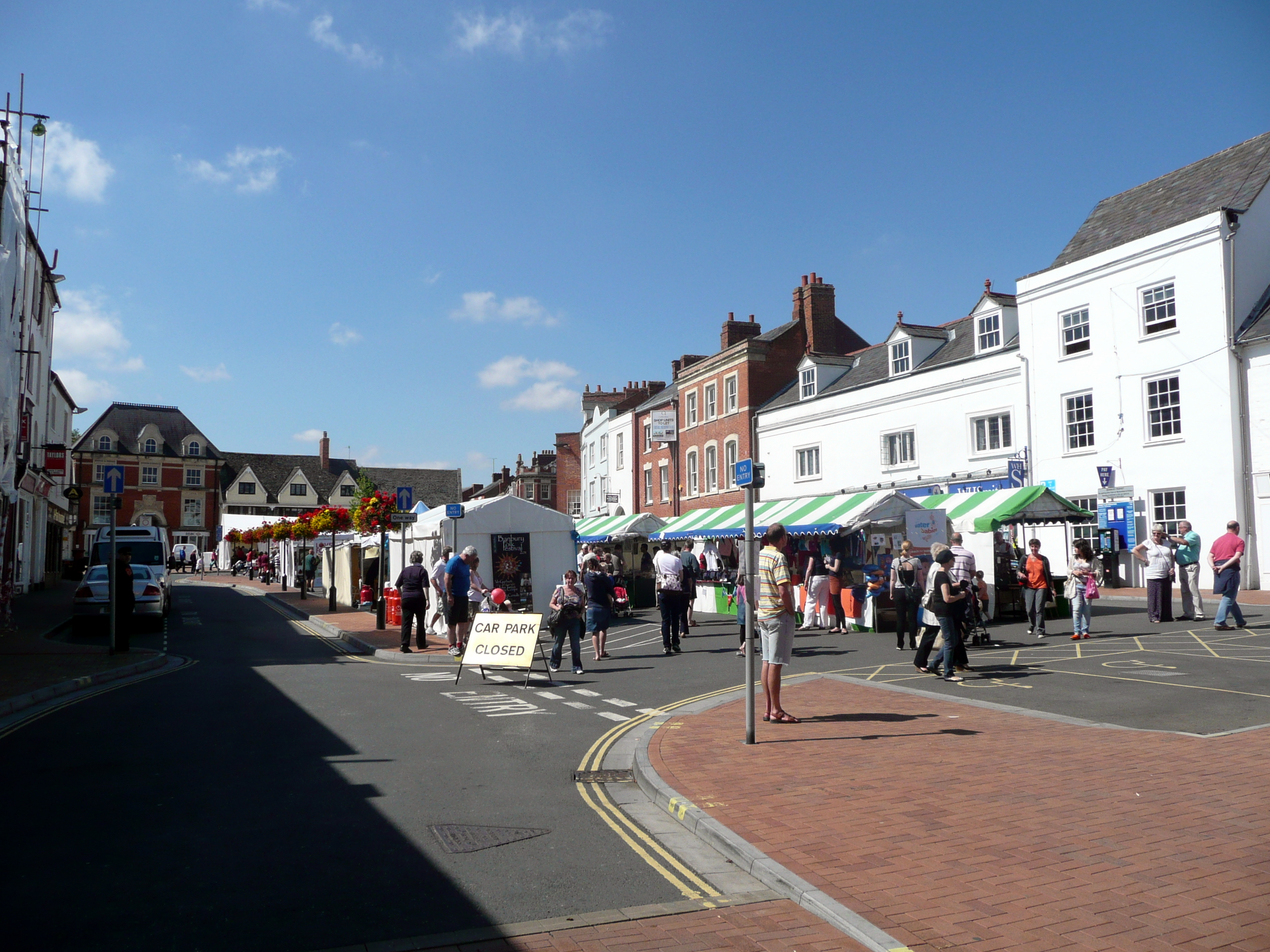
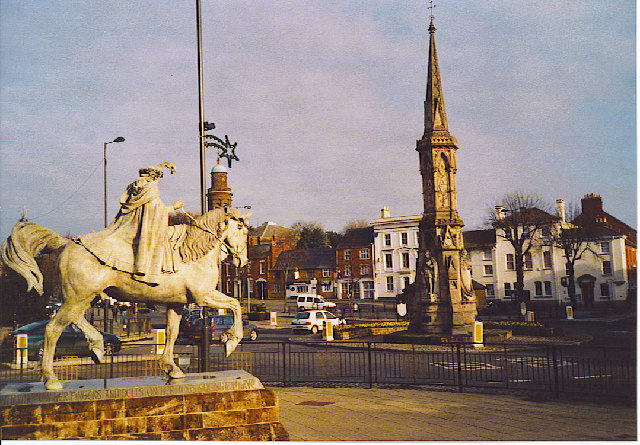
- Clockwise, from top: Banbury Town Hall; The Fine Lady statue and Banbury Cross; Banbury Market Place

- Location within Oxfordshire
- Area: 21.04 km^{2} (8.12 sq mi)
- Population: 54,335 (Parish, 2021); 52,045 (Built up area, 2021)
- OS grid reference: SP4540
  - London: 64 mi (103 km) SE
- District: Cherwell
- Shire county: Oxfordshire
- Region: South East
- Country: England
- Sovereign state: United Kingdom
- Post town: BANBURY
- Postcode district: OX16
- Dialling code: 01295
- Police: Thames Valley
- Fire: Oxfordshire
- Ambulance: South Central
- UK Parliament: Banbury
- Website: www.banbury.gov.uk

Banbury is an historic market town and civil parish on the River Cherwell in Oxfordshire, officially part of South East England.

Banbury is a significant commercial and retail centre for the surrounding area of north Oxfordshire and southern parts of Warwickshire and Northamptonshire which are predominantly rural. Banbury's main industries are motorsport, car components, electrical goods, plastics, food processing and printing. Banbury is home to the Jacobs Douwe Egberts factory which was previously the world's largest coffee-producing facility, built in 1964. The town is famed for Banbury cakes, a spiced sweet pastry.

Banbury is located 64 miles (103 km) north-west of London, 37 miles (60 km) south-east of Birmingham, 27 miles (43 km) south-east of Coventry and 22 miles (35 km) north-northwest of Oxford. The parish had a population of 54,335 at the 2021 Census.

== Toponymy ==
The name Banbury may derive from "Banna", a Saxon chieftain said to have built a stockade there in the 6th century (or possibly a byname from Old English: bana meaning felon, murderer), and burgh / burh meaning settlement. In Anglo-Saxon it was called Banesburh (dative Banesbyrig). The name appears as Banesberie in the Domesday Book of 1086. Another known spelling was Banesebury in medieval times.

== History ==
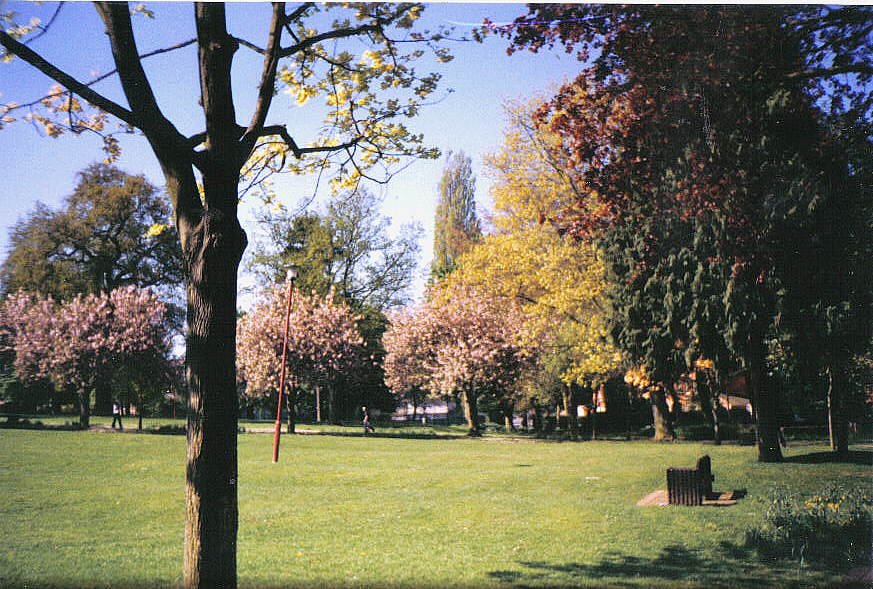
People's Park in 2001

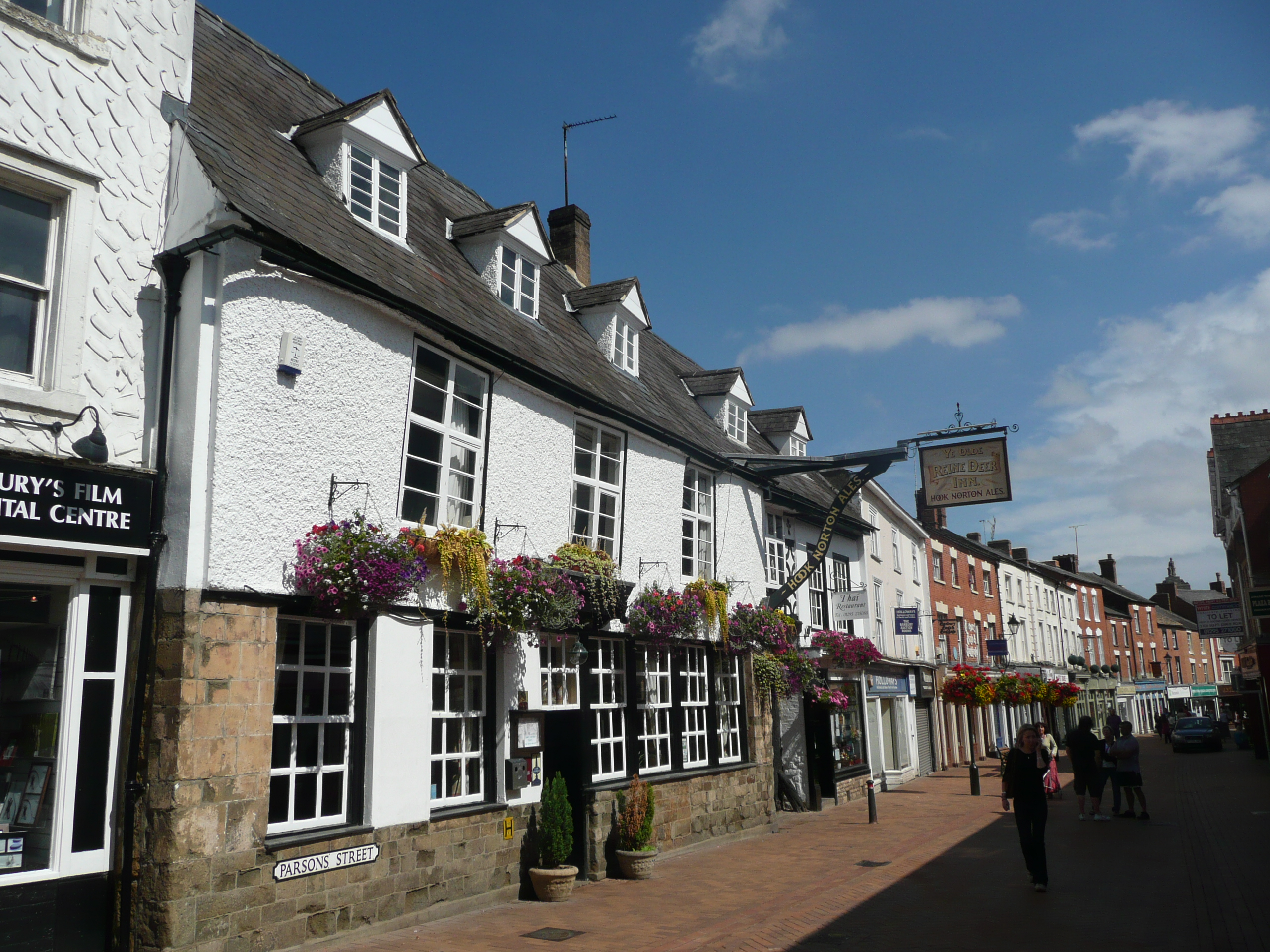
Banbury's oldest pub, the Reindeer Inn

Archaeological evidence has been found for a British Iron Age settlement with circular buildings, dating back to 200 BC, in the Hennef Way area. Later there was a Roman villa at Wykham Park.

The area was settled by the Saxons around the late 5th century. It was a local centre for Anglo-Saxon settlement by the mid-6th century. Banbury developed in the Anglo-Saxon period under Danish influence, starting in the late 6th century. It was assessed at 50 hides in the Domesday survey and was then held by the Bishop of Lincoln.

The Saxons built Banbury on the west bank of the River Cherwell. On the opposite bank they built Grimsbury, which was formerly part of Northamptonshire. Another district, Neithrop, is one of the oldest areas in Banbury, having first been recorded as a hamlet in the 13th century.

Banbury stands at the junction of two ancient roads: Salt Way (used as a bridle path to the west and south of the town), its primary use being transport of salt; and Banbury Lane, which began near Northampton and is closely followed by the modern 22-mile-long (35 km) road. It continued through what is now Banbury's High Street and towards the Fosse Way at Stow-on-the-Wold. Banbury's medieval prosperity was based on wool.

Banbury Castle was built from 1135 by Alexander, Bishop of Lincoln, and survived into the Civil War in the 1640s, when it was besieged.

During the Civil War, due to its proximity to Oxford, the King's capital, Banbury was at one stage a Royalist town, but the inhabitants were known to be strongly Puritan. The town later became pro-Parliamentarian, but the castle was manned by a Royalist garrison who supported King Charles I. The Reindeer Inn (now 'Ye Olde Reine Deer Inn') was reputedly used as a base by Oliver Cromwell, particularly in preparing for the Battle of Edge Hill in 1642. In 1645, Parliamentary troops were billeted in nearby Hanwell for nine weeks and villagers petitioned the Warwickshire Committee of Accounts to pay for feeding them. The castle was demolished after the war.

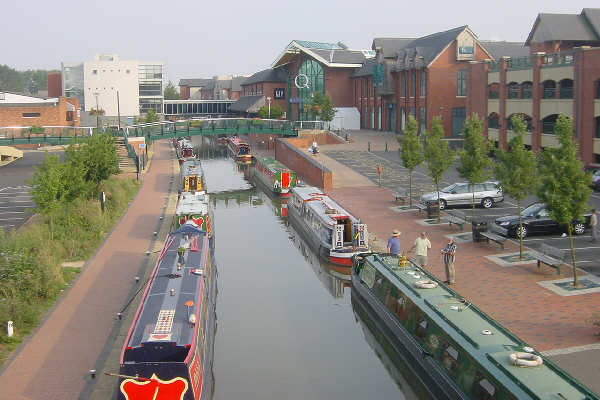
The modern Castle Quay Shopping Centre alongside the Oxford Canal, with Banbury Museum in the background

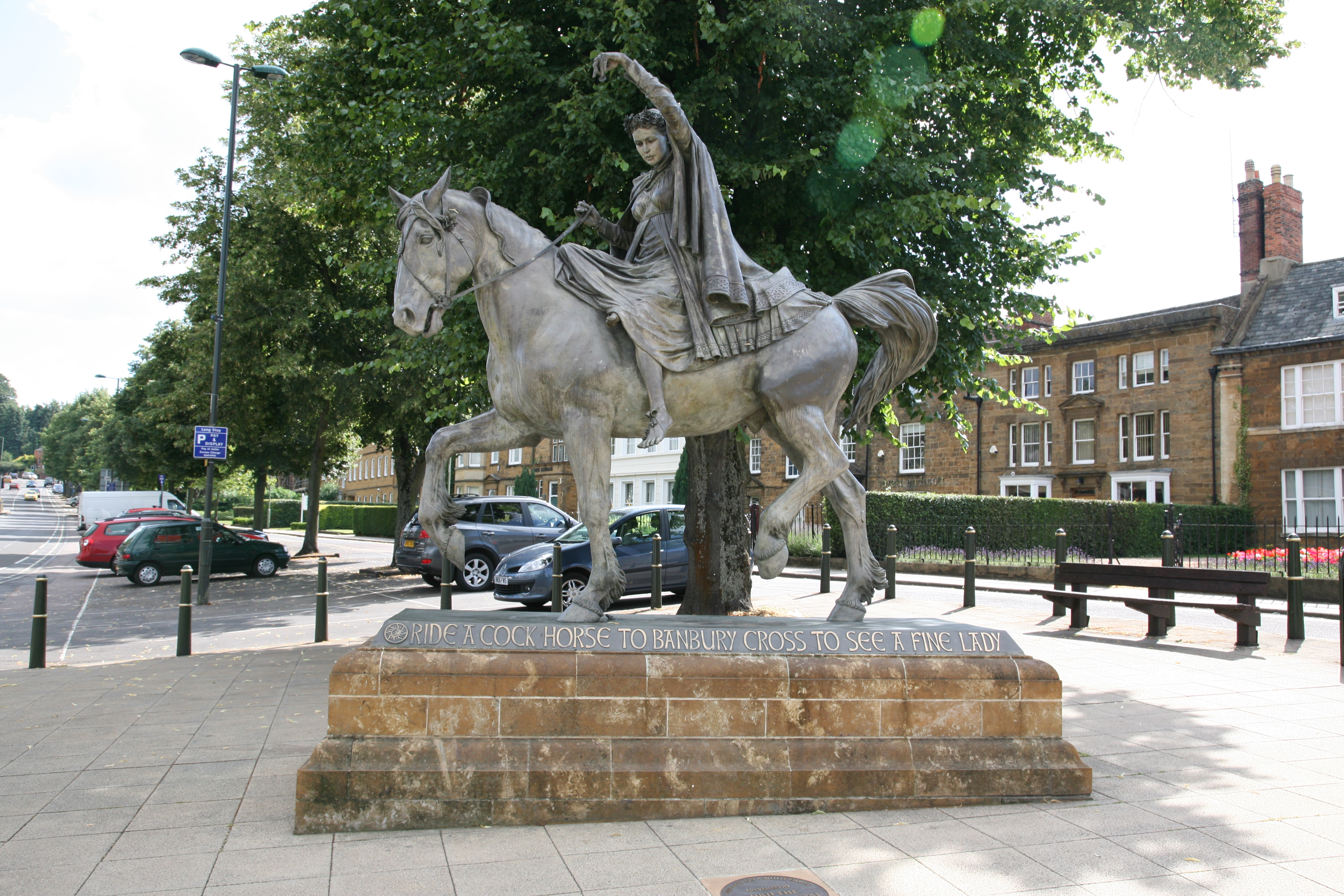
Banbury's 'Fine Lady' Statue

The opening of the Oxford Canal from Hawkesbury Junction to Banbury on 30 March 1778 gave the town a cheap and reliable supply of Warwickshire coal. In 1787 the Oxford Canal was extended southwards, finally opening to Oxford on 1 January 1790. The canal's main boat yard was the original outlay of today's Tooley's Boatyard. The railway reached Banbury in 1850; Merton Street station on the Buckinghamshire Railway to Bletchley opened in May 1850, followed by Bridge Street station, later renamed Banbury General, on the Great Western Railway in September 1850.

People's Park was set up as a private park in 1890 and opened in 1910, along with the adjacent bowling green.

The land south of the New Foscote Hospital in Calthorpe and Easington Farm were mostly open farmland until the early 1960s. The Ruscote estate, which now has a notable South Asian community, was expanded in the 1950s because of the growth of the town due to the London overspill and further grew in the mid-1960s.

British Railways closed Merton Street railway station and the Buckingham to Banbury line to passenger traffic at the end of 1960. Merton Street goods depot continued to handle livestock traffic for Banbury's cattle market until 1966, when this too was discontinued and the railway dismantled. In March 1962 Sir John Betjeman celebrated the line from Culworth Junction in his poem Great Central Railway, Sheffield Victoria to Banbury. British Railways closed this line too in 1966.

The main railway station, previously called Banbury General but now called simply Banbury, is now served by trains running from London Paddington via Reading and Oxford once daily, from London Marylebone via High Wycombe and Bicester onwards to Birmingham and Kidderminster and by CrossCountry Trains from Bournemouth and Reading to Birmingham, Manchester and Newcastle.

Banbury used to have a large cattle market. Situated on Merton Street in Grimsbury, for many decades, cattle and other farm animals were driven there on the hoof from as far as Scotland to be sold to feed the growing population of London and other towns. Since its closure in June 1998, a new housing development and Dashwood Primary School have been built on its site. The estate, which lies between Banbury and Hanwell, was built on the grounds of Hanwell Farm during 2005 and 2006.

=== Banburyshire ===
The name 'Banburyshire' is sometimes used informally to describe the area centred on Banbury, claimed to include parts of Northamptonshire and Warwickshire as well as north Oxfordshire. Use of the term dates from the early to mid 19th century. It was common in the 19th century for market towns in England to describe their hinterland by tacking "shire" onto the town's name. "Stones Map of Banburyshire" held by the Centre of Banbury Studies was published in the 1870s or 1880s and it asserted that the term originated in the 1830s but no source is given for that assertion. In the 1850s magazine articles used "Banburyshire" or the hyphenated term "Banbury-shire". The Banburyshire Natural History Society was formed in 1881. In the 20th century a number of books used the term "Banburyshire" in their titles, dating from the early 1960s.

The county of Oxfordshire has two main commercial centres, the city of Oxford itself that serves most of the south of the county, and Banbury that serves the north (such as Adderbury, Cropredy, Deddington, Wroxton, Great Bourton, and Bloxham) plus parts of the neighbouring counties of Northamptonshire and Warwickshire.

== Governance ==
There are three tiers of local government covering Banbury, at civil parish (town), district, and county level: Banbury Town Council, Cherwell District Council, and Oxfordshire County Council. The town council is based at Banbury Town Hall on Bridge Street.

=== Administrative history ===
Banbury was an ancient parish. The parish historically straddled the boundary between Oxfordshire and Northamptonshire, which followed the River Cherwell. The Oxfordshire part of the parish (west of the river) included the town itself and the hamlets of Neithrop, Calthorpe, Easington, Hardwick, and Wykham. The Northamptonshire part of the parish (east of the river) included the hamlets of Grimsbury and Nethercote.

In 1554, Mary I issued a charter which incorporated the town as a borough. Prior to that, it had been a lower status seigneurial borough, controlled by the Bishop of Lincoln as lord of the manor. Mary's charter defined a borough boundary matching the parish, but the borough later came to be defined as a much smaller area, just covering the urban area as it then was.

From the 17th century onwards, parishes were gradually given various civil functions under the poor laws, in addition to their original ecclesiastical functions. In some cases, including Banbury, the civil functions were exercised by subdivisions of the parish rather than the parish as a whole. In Banbury's case, the parish was split into three parts for administering the poor laws: the area of the borough, the remainder of the Oxfordshire part of the parish (known as the township of Neithrop), and the Northamptonshire part of the parish. The latter part was jointly administered with the neighbouring parish of Warkworth. In 1866, the legal definition of 'parish' was changed to be the areas used for administering the poor laws, and so the old ecclesiastical parish of Banbury (which retained its church functions) diverged from the civil parishes of Banbury (just covering the borough), Neithrop and Warkworth.

The borough was reformed to become a municipal borough in 1836 under the Municipal Corporations Act 1835, which standardised how most boroughs operated across the country. The borough's powers were primarily judicial rather than providing public services for the growing town. In order to provide services and infrastructure, the whole ecclesiastical parish of Banbury was made a local board district in 1852, with the local board being responsible for sewers, public health, and other aspects of local government. The borough corporation and the local board then existed alongside each other, with their differently defined areas and roles, until 1889.

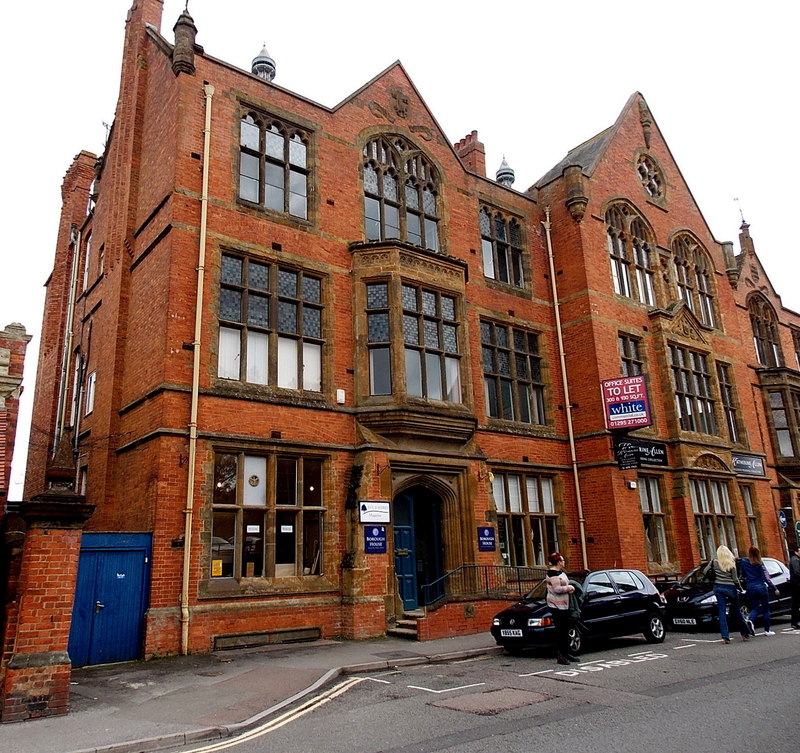
Former Municipal Technical School, Marlborough Road: Borough council's headquarters 1930–1974

In 1889, following the Local Government Act 1888, the Northamptonshire parts of the local board district (Grimsbury and Nethercote) were transferred to Oxfordshire, and the local board's functions were transferred to the borough corporation, with the borough being enlarged to cover the whole of the old local board district. The borough council met at Banbury Town Hall until 1930, when it moved its offices and meetings to the former Municipal Technical School (built 1893) on Marlborough Road.

The municipal borough of Banbury was abolished in 1974 under the Local Government Act 1972, with its area becoming part of the new Cherwell district.

No successor parish was created for Banbury at the time of the 1974 reforms and so it became unparished; instead, the Cherwell councillors who represented wards in Banbury acted as charter trustees to preserve the town's civic traditions, including appointing one of them to take the title of mayor each year. A number of roads are named after former mayors, including Mascord Road, Mold Crescent and Fairfax Close. A new civil parish of Banbury was created in 2000, with its parish council taking the name Banbury Town Council. Since then, the chair of the town council has taken the title of mayor.

== Geography ==
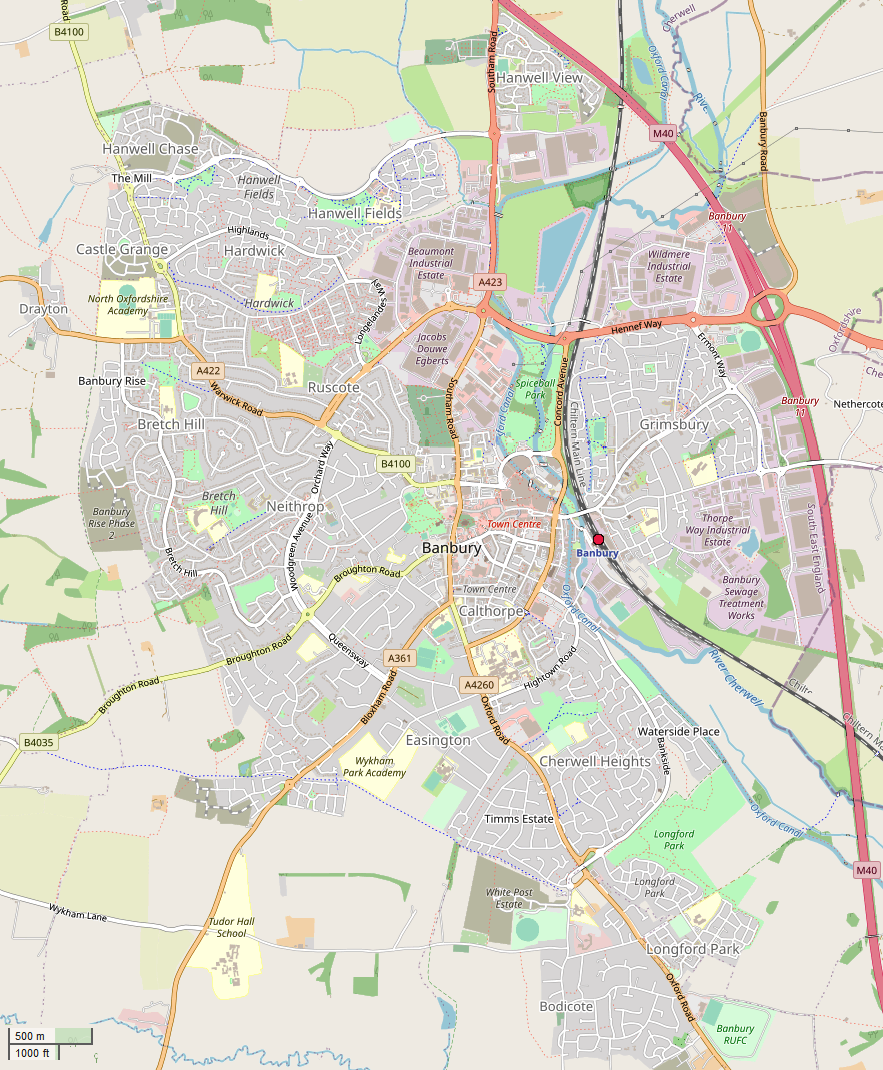
Map of Banbury

Banbury is in the Cherwell Valley with many hills in and around the town. Apart from the town centre, much of Banbury is on a slope and each entry into the town is downhill. Estates such as Bretch Hill and Hardwick are built on top of a hill and much of the town can be seen from both. Other notable hills include Crouch Hill, the more central Pinn Hill, and Strawberry Hill on the outskirts of Easington. Mine Hill and Rye Hill lie, along with many others, to the northeast, southeast and west of Banbury.

Banbury is located at the bank of the River Cherwell which sweeps through the town, going just east of the town centre with Grimsbury being the only estate east of the river. Banbury is at the northern extreme of the UK's South East England region, less than two miles (3 km) from the boundary with the East Midlands, and three miles (5 km) from that with the West Midlands. As such it has close cultural links with neighbouring Midlands towns such as Stratford-upon-Avon, Leamington Spa, and Warwick.

In 1998 and 2007, Banbury was subject to heavy flooding due to its location by the River Cherwell. Heavy clay and ironstone deposits deposits surround Banbury.

== Industry and commerce ==
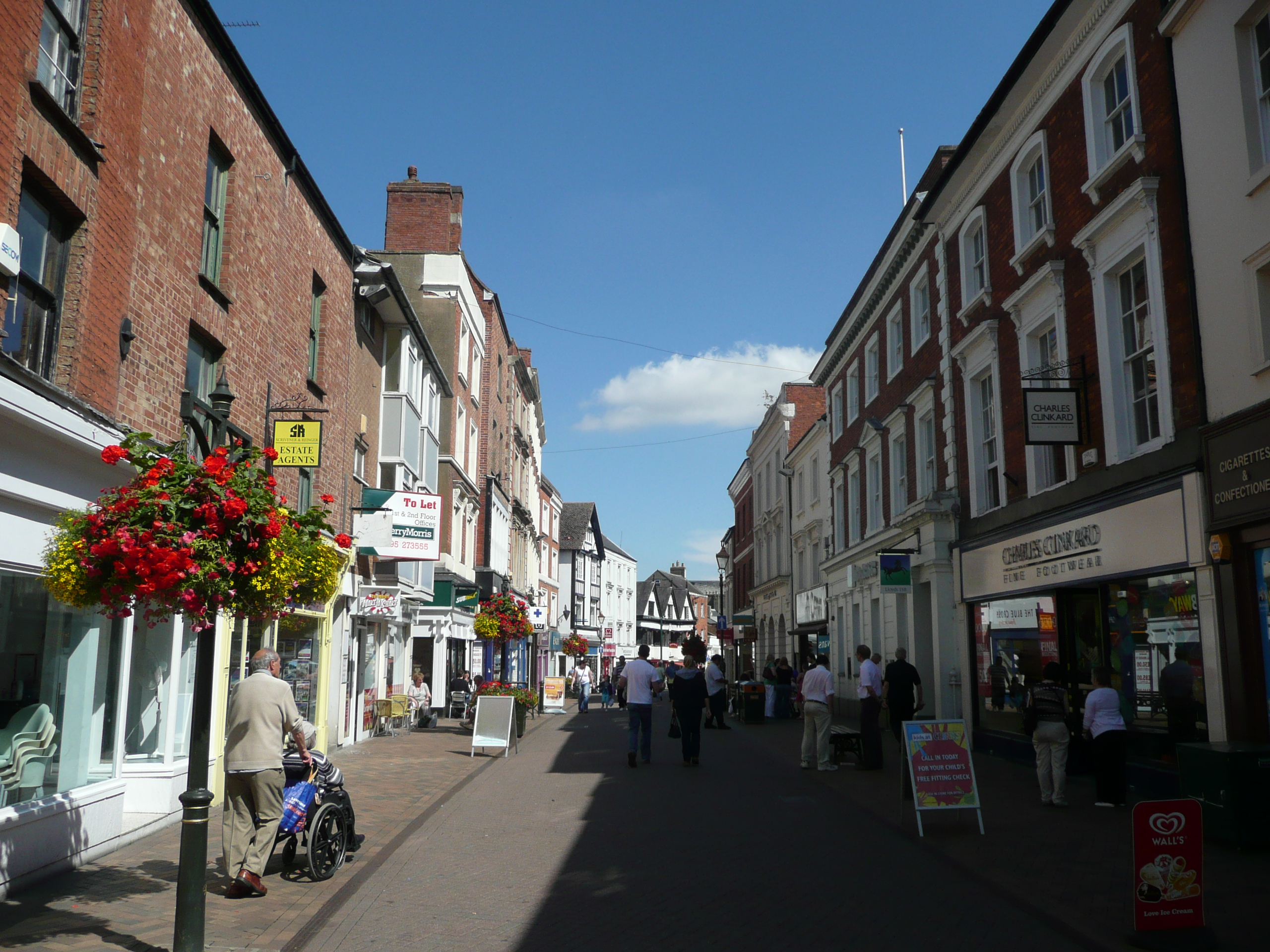
Banbury High Street

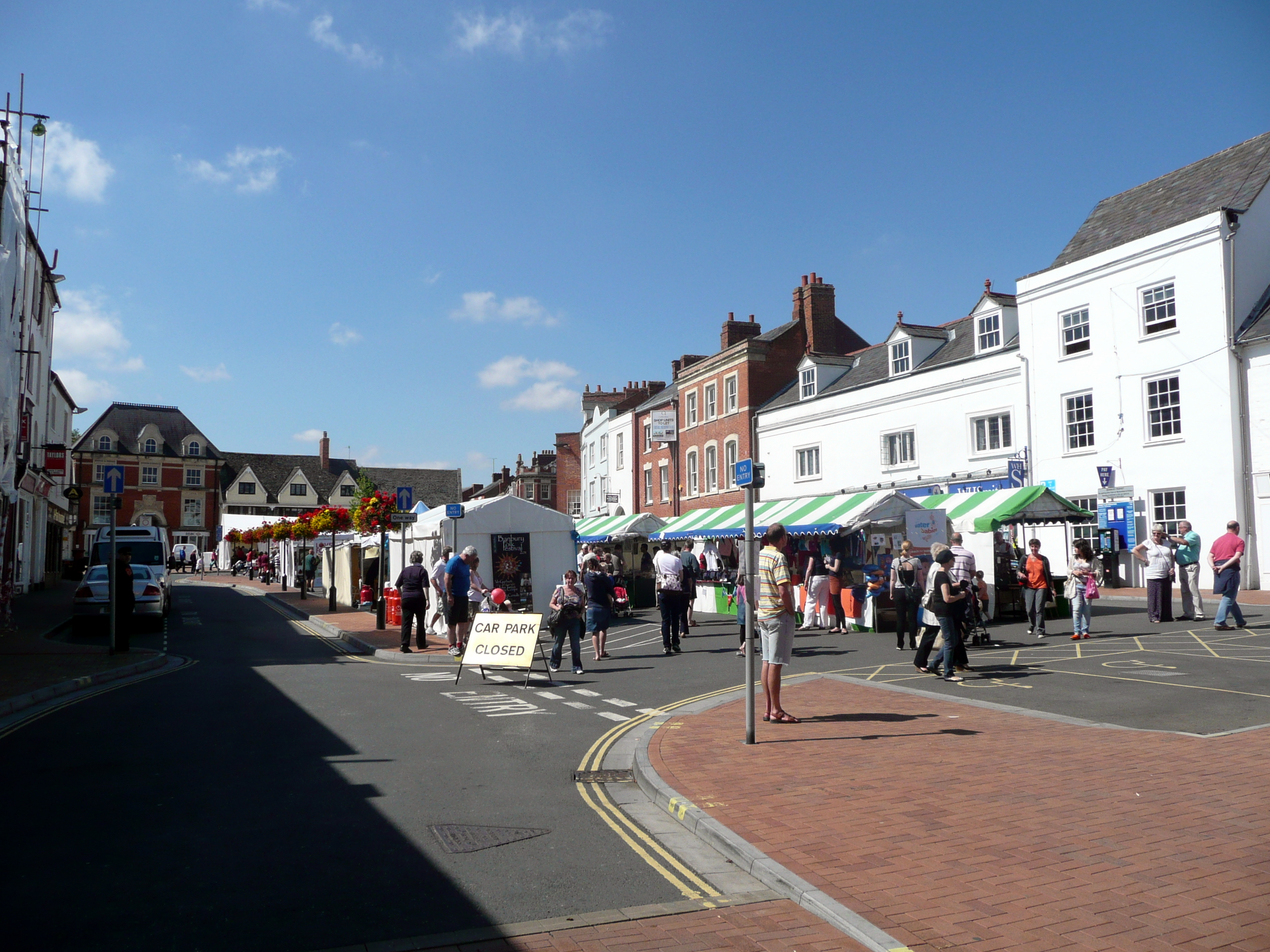
Banbury Market Place

The Domesday Book in 1086 listed three mills, with a total fiscal value of 45 shillings, on the Bishop of Lincoln's demesne lands, and a fourth which was leased to Robert son of Waukelin by the Bishop. Among Banbury's four Medieval mills was probably a forerunner of Banbury Mill, first referred to by this name in 1695. In 1279, Laurence of Hardwick was also paying 3 marks (equivalent to 40 shillings) in annual rent to the Bishop for a mill in the then Hardwick hamlet. The forerunners of Butchers Row were probably long standing butchers' stalls which were known to be in situ by 1438. The old Victorian Corn Exchange is now used as an entrance to a shopping centre.

The Northern Aluminium Co. Ltd. or Alcan Industries Ltd. pig and rolled aluminium factory was opened in 1931 on land acquired in 1929 on the east of the Southam road, in the then hamlet of Hardwick. The various Alcan facilities on the 53-acre site closed between 2006 and 2007. The factory was demolished between 2008 and 2009. The laboratory was also closed in 2004 and is now used as offices for numerous companies. Another major employer is Jacobs Douwe Egberts, which produces instant coffee. The facility moved to Banbury from Birmingham in 1965.

In the central area were built many large shops, a bus station, and a large car park north of Castle Street. In 1969 proposals for the redevelopment of the central area were in hand, leading to the creation of the Castle shopping centre in 1977 (the centre was later combined into the Castle Quay centre). The 1977 plans to build a multi-storey car park on what is now the open air car park behind Matalan and Poundland were scrapped in 1978 and another one was built to the rear of the Castle Shopping Centre in 1978.

The former Hunt Edmunds brewery premises became Crest Hotels headquarters, but closed in the late 1970s and was abandoned in the late 1980s, while the Crown Hotel and the Foremost Tyres/Excel Exhausts shops found new owners after they closed in 1976 due to falling sales. Hella, a vehicle electronics firm, closed its factory on the Southam Road in the mid-2000s. The ironmonger, Hoods, opened in the mid-1960s and closed in 2007, with the shop becoming part of the then enlarged Marks and Spencer.

=== Motorsport ===
Owing to the surrounding area's notable links with world motorsport, the town is home to many organisations within the industry. Prodrive, one of the world's largest motorsport and automotive technology specialists, is based in the town as are a host of race teams involved in competition across many different disciplines and countries.

Within Formula One, two teams have had their base of operations in Banbury. The Simtek team which competed in the 1994 and 1995 F1 World Championships was based on the Wildmere Industrial Estate. The Marussia F1 team had its manufacturing and production facility sited on Thorpe Way Industrial Estate using the building formerly owned by Ascari Cars, a luxury sports car manufacturer. Both Simtek and Marussia F1 had been brought to Banbury by Nick Wirth who owned the Simtek team and was the former Technical Director at Marussia. After Marussia F1 went into administration in 2014, their base was purchased by the United States–based Haas F1 Team to service their cars during the European races.

Until 2017, when the team went into administration and subsequently folded, Manor Racing (the successor to Marussia) was based in the town.

Arden Motorsport, a British multi-formula motorsports team (founded by former Red Bull Racing boss Christian Horner), is also based in the town.

The Formula E teams Mahindra Racing and Andretti Formula E Team are based in Banbury.

=== Employment ===
Banbury has one of the UK's lowest unemployment rates, as of April 2016 it stood at 0.7%. Once Poland joined the European Union in 2004, a number of Banbury-based employment agencies began advertising for staff in major Polish newspapers. In 2006 one estimate placed between 5,000 and 6,000 Poles in the town. With the influx of the largely Roman Catholic Poles, one local church was offering a Mass said partially in Polish and specialist Polish food shops had opened.

=== Companies and charities ===
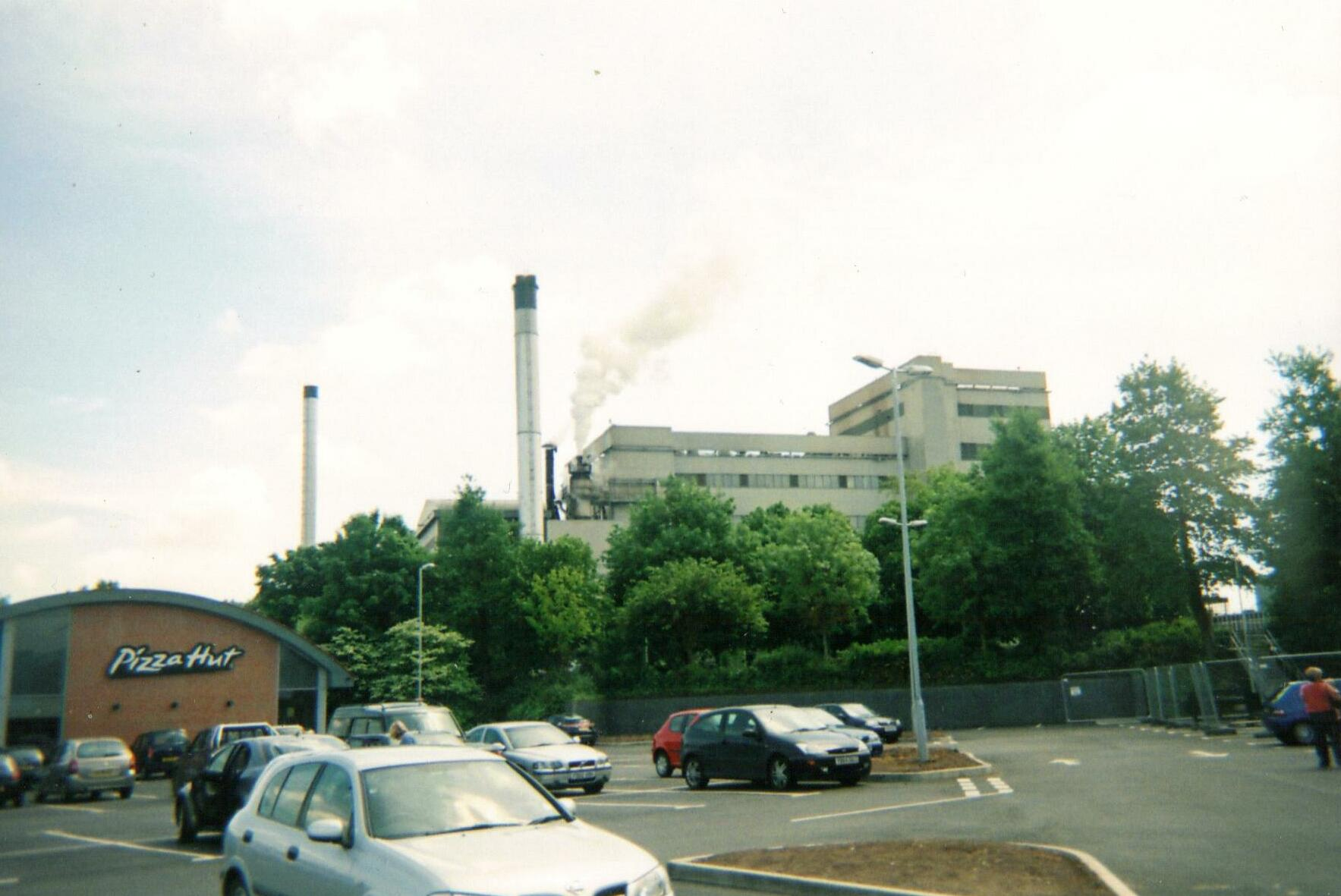
The Jacobs Douwe Egberts factory in Banbury has been a major employer in the town since the mid-1960s.

Jacobs Douwe Egberts, in the Ruscote ward of Banbury, is a large food packaging factory. It was built in 1964 and has gone through a number of ownership changes since. It is still sometimes known by its previous names of Bird's, Kraft and General Foods or GF.

The factory was previously the world's largest coffee-processing facility until coffee production on the site came to an end in 2023. The current owners have announced plans to close the factory in 2026.

- Westminster Group
- Norbar
- Arrival
- Waste & Resources Action Programme
- Dogs for Good
- Warburtons

=== Cattle market ===
Banbury was once home to Western Europe's largest cattle market, on Merton Street in Grimsbury. The market was a key feature of Victorian life in the town and county. It was formally closed in June 1998, after being abandoned several years earlier and was replaced with a new housing development and Dashwood Primary School.

== Transport ==
=== Railway ===
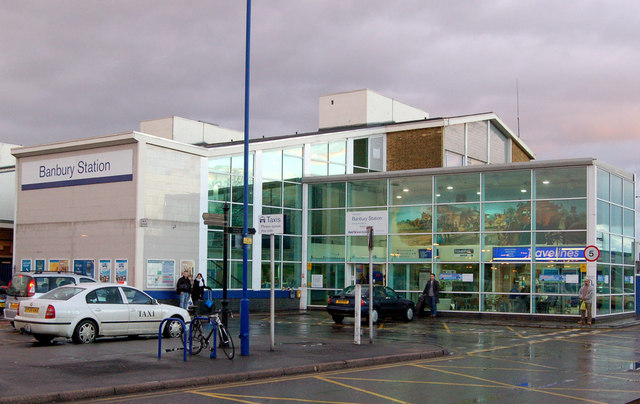
Banbury railway station

Banbury railway station is served by three train operating companies:

- Chiltern Railways operates services on the Chiltern Main Line between Birmingham Snow Hill and London Marylebone, via Warwick
- Great Western Railway runs services to Oxford and Didcot Parkway
- CrossCountry operates inter-city services between Manchester Piccadilly and Bournemouth, via Birmingham New Street, Reading and Southampton Central.

=== Buses and coaches ===
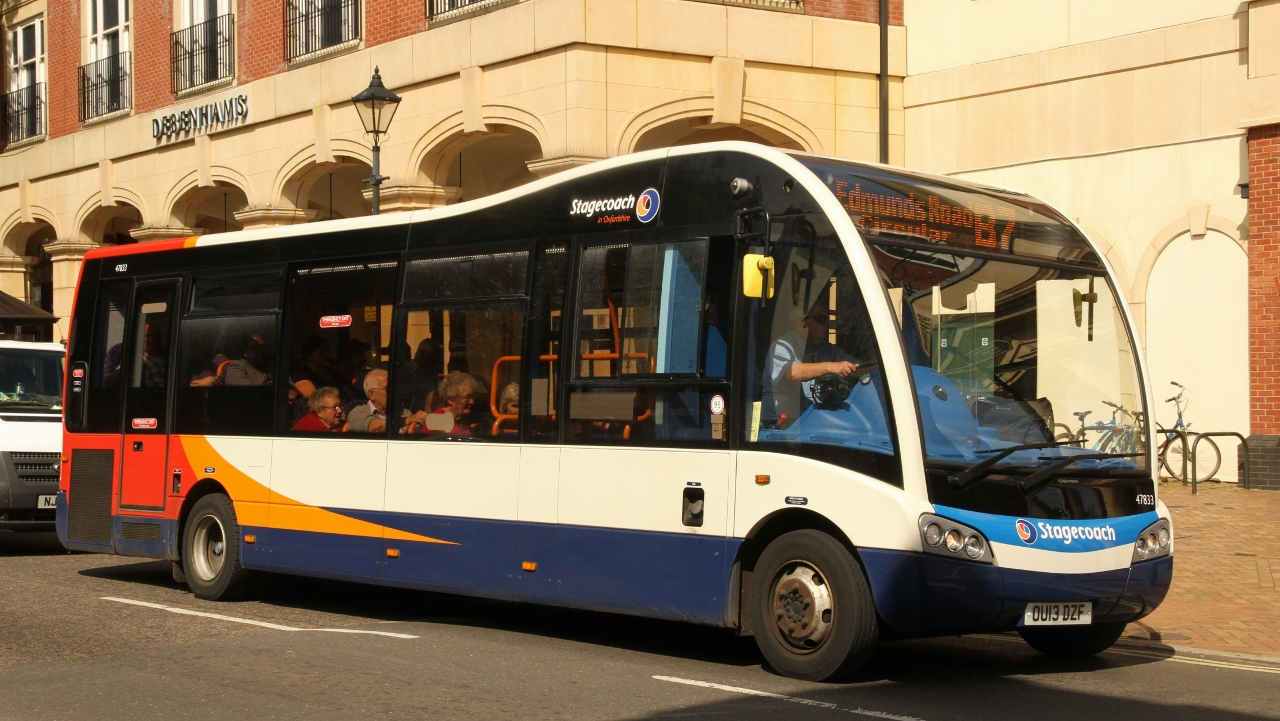
A Stagecoach in Oxfordshire bus in Bridge Street, on route B7 to Neithrop

The town's bus routes are operated primarily by Stagecoach in Oxfordshire both within the town and linking it with Brackley, Chipping Norton, Oxford and places further afield including Daventry, Leamington Spa and Stratford-upon-Avon.

=== Roads ===
Hennef Way (A422) was upgraded to a dual carriageway, easing traffic on the heavily congested road and providing north Banbury and the town centre with higher-capacity links to the M40 motorway.

=== Canal ===
The Oxford Canal is a popular place for pleasure trips and tourism. The canal's main boatyard is now the listed site Tooley's Boatyard.

== Media ==
The Banbury Guardian is published weekly on Thursdays by Johnston Press, is priced for sale and is a tabloid. The Banbury Cake was formerly a free newspaper: its print edition ceased publication in 2017 and its website subsequently also closed.

Regional TV news is provided by BBC South and ITV Meridian. Television signals are received from the Oxford TV transmitter, although some parts of the town get a better TV signal from the local relay transmitter which is served by BBC West Midlands and ITV Central.

Local radio stations are Banbury FM, BBC Radio Oxford, Heart South, and Capital Mid-Counties. Banbury Music Radio was a local Internet radio station.

== Places of interest ==
=== Banbury Cross ===
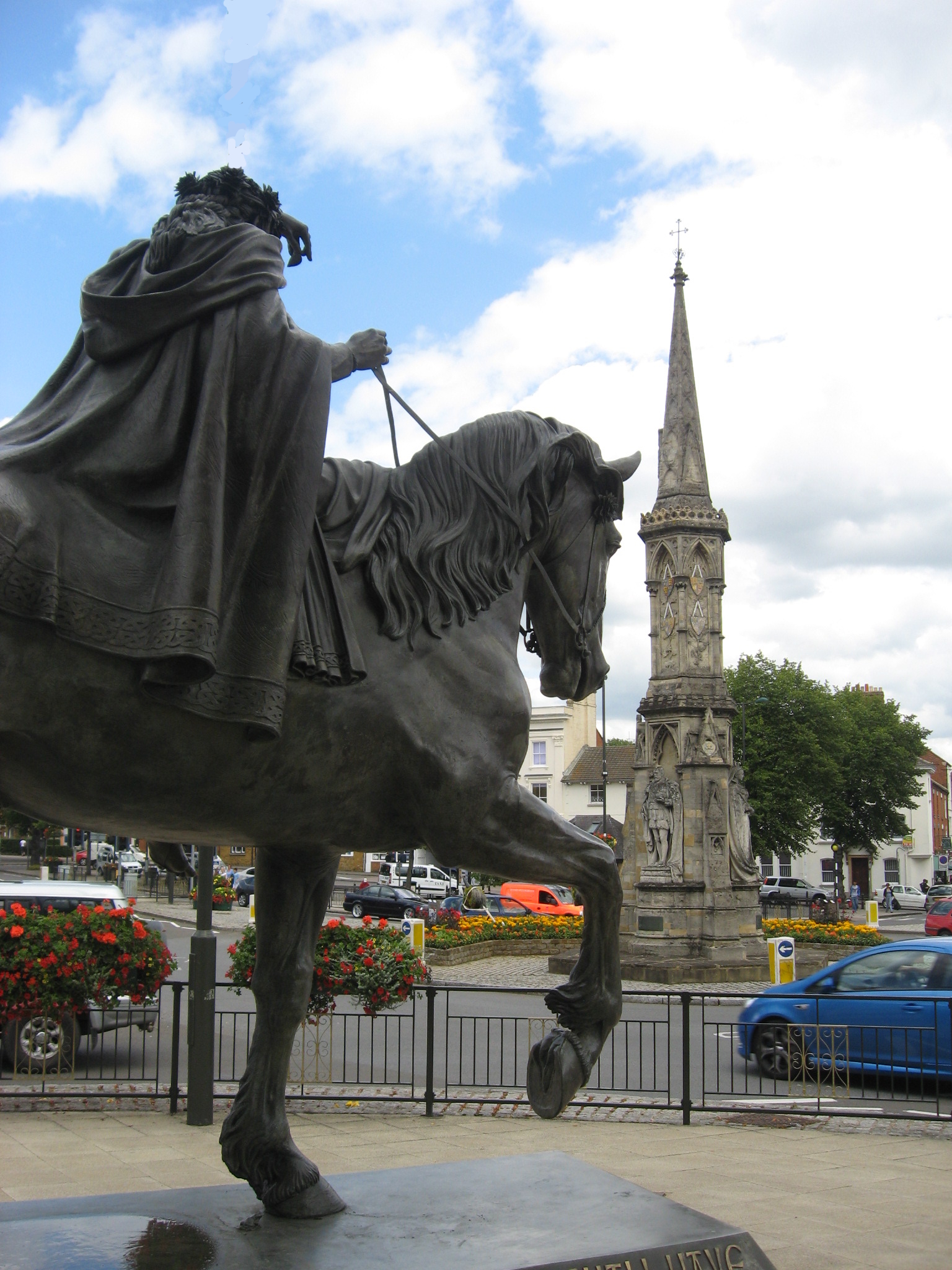
The 'Fine Lady' statue and Banbury Cross. The cross was designed by John Gibbs and erected in 1859.

At one time Banbury had many crosses (the High Cross, the Bread Cross and the White Cross), but these were destroyed by Puritans in 1600. Banbury remained without a cross for more than 250 years until the current Banbury Cross was erected in 1859 at the centre of the town to commemorate the marriage of Victoria, Princess Royal (eldest child of Queen Victoria) to Prince Frederick of Prussia. The current Banbury Cross is a stone, spire-shaped monument decorated in Gothic form and designed by the Gothic Revival architect John Gibbs. Statues of Queen Victoria, Edward VII and George V were added in 1914 to commemorate the coronation of George V. The cross is 52 feet 6 inches (16 m) high, and topped by a gilt cross. Towns with crosses in England before the reformation were places of Christian pilgrimage.

The English nursery rhyme "Ride a cock horse to Banbury Cross", in its several forms, may refer to one of the crosses destroyed by Puritans in 1600. In April 2005, Princess Anne unveiled a large bronze statue depicting the Fine Lady upon a White Horse of the nursery rhyme. It stands on the corner of West Bar and South Bar, just yards from the present Banbury Cross.

=== Banbury Museum & Gallery ===
Banbury has a museum in the town centre near Spiceball Park, replacing the old museum near Banbury Cross. It is accessible over a bridge from the Castle Quay Shopping Centre or via Spiceball Park Road. Admission to the museum is free. The town's tourist information centre is located in the museum entrance in the Castle Quay Shopping Centre.

=== Tooley's Boatyard ===
Tooley's Boatyard was built in 1778 and is a historic site with a nearly 250-year-old blacksmiths' shop and narrow boat dry dock.

=== Spiceball Centre and Park ===
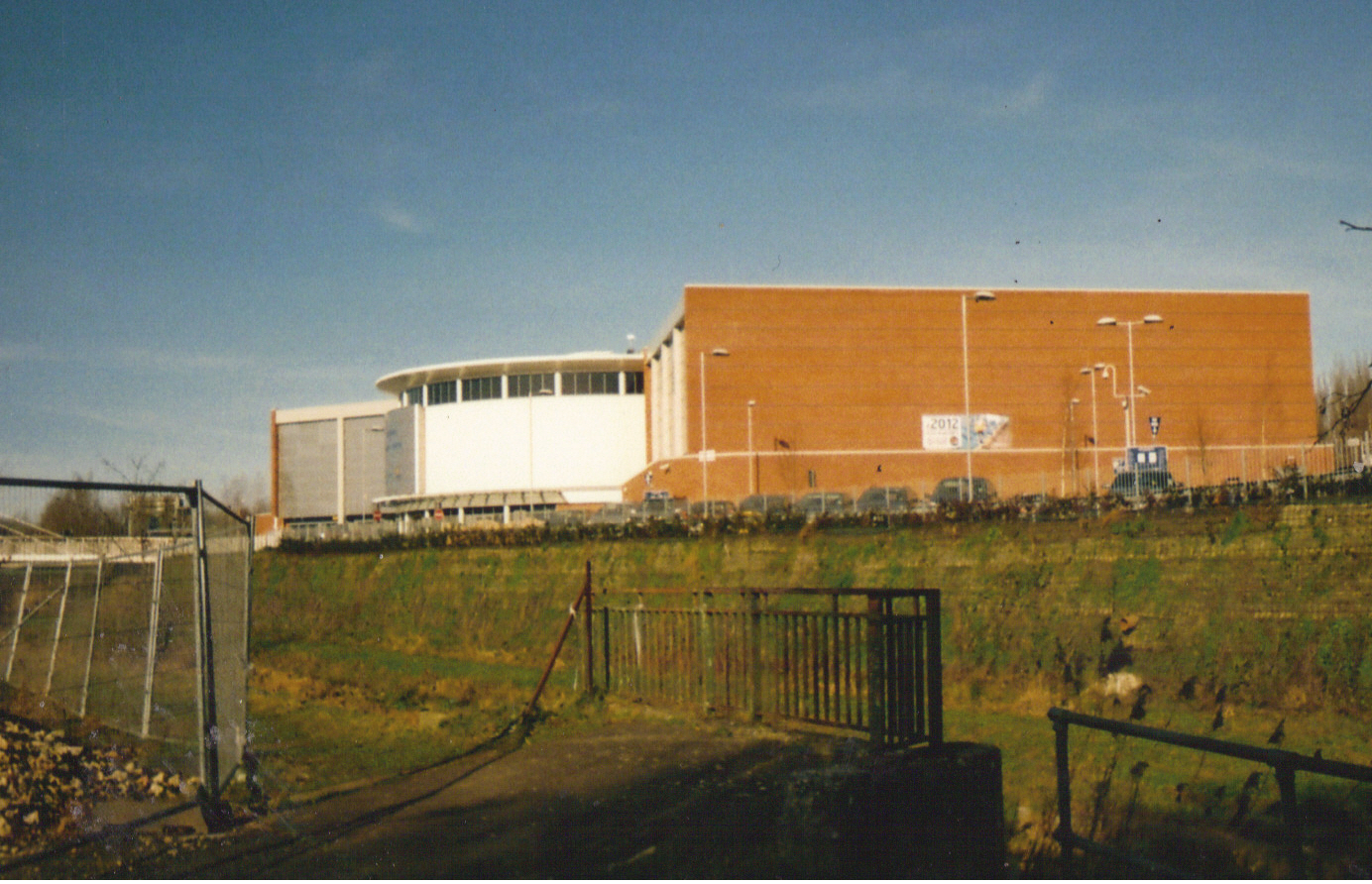
Spiceball centre in 2010

Spiceball Park is the largest park in Banbury. It is east of the Oxford Canal, mainly west of the River Cherwell, north of Castle Quay and south of Hennef Way. It includes three large fields, a children's play area and a skateboard park. Across the road from the main park there is the sports centre, which includes a swimming pool, courts, café and gym facilities. The sports centre began to be re-developed in late 2009, for a new centre and café, which was completed by mid 2010.

=== Other recreational areas and parks ===
Neithrop is home to the People's Park which opened in 1910, and has a bird house, tennis courts, a large field and a children's play area. The park is often used in the summer to hold small festivals. The park is also one of the town's biggest in terms of the area covered and one of the few major ones not to be built on a steep hill. Easington Recreation Ground is another principal park and recreational area.

=== Notable place names ===
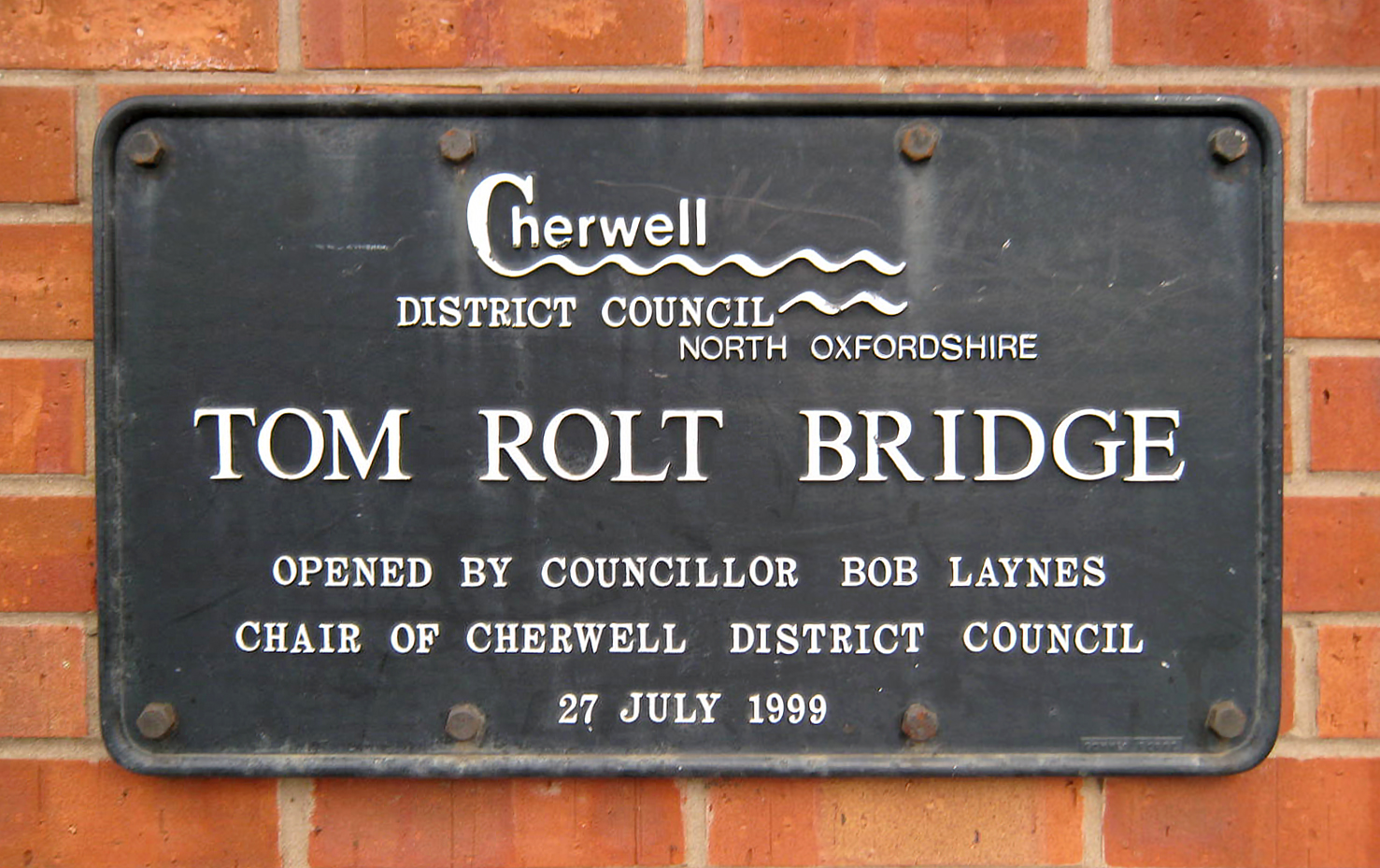
Plaque at bridge 164 on the Oxford Canal, Banbury

- Since 1999 bridge 164 on the Oxford Canal in Banbury has borne Tom Rolt's name in commemoration of his book Narrow Boat (as does the Tom Rolt Centre at the Ellesmere Port section of the National Waterways Museum). A blue plaque commemorating Rolt was unveiled at Tooley's Boatyard, Banbury on 7 August 2010 as part of the centenary celebrations of his birth.
- Concorde Avenue was named in a 1995 street naming contest in honour of the 50 years' peace (1945–1995) in Europe since the Second World War.
- Claypits Close was built in about 2007 and named after the old clay pit on which it was built. There were many small, Victorian clay pits and kilns in the south west of Banbury, but they had closed by the 1920s.
- Gillett Road was named after either Joseph Ashby Gillett, who ran Banbury's branch of 18th century Britain's New Bank, or his descendant Sarah Beatrice Gillett, who was mayor in 1926.

== Education ==
One of the campuses of Activate Learning, Banbury and Bicester College, as well as one of the international campuses of Fairleigh Dickinson University at Wroxton Abbey are situated in Banbury. The town also has four secondary schools – North Oxfordshire Academy, Wykham Park Academy, Space Studio Banbury and Blessed George Napier Roman Catholic School – and a number of primary schools. Independent schools in Banbury include Tudor Hall and Al-Madina School.

== Religion ==
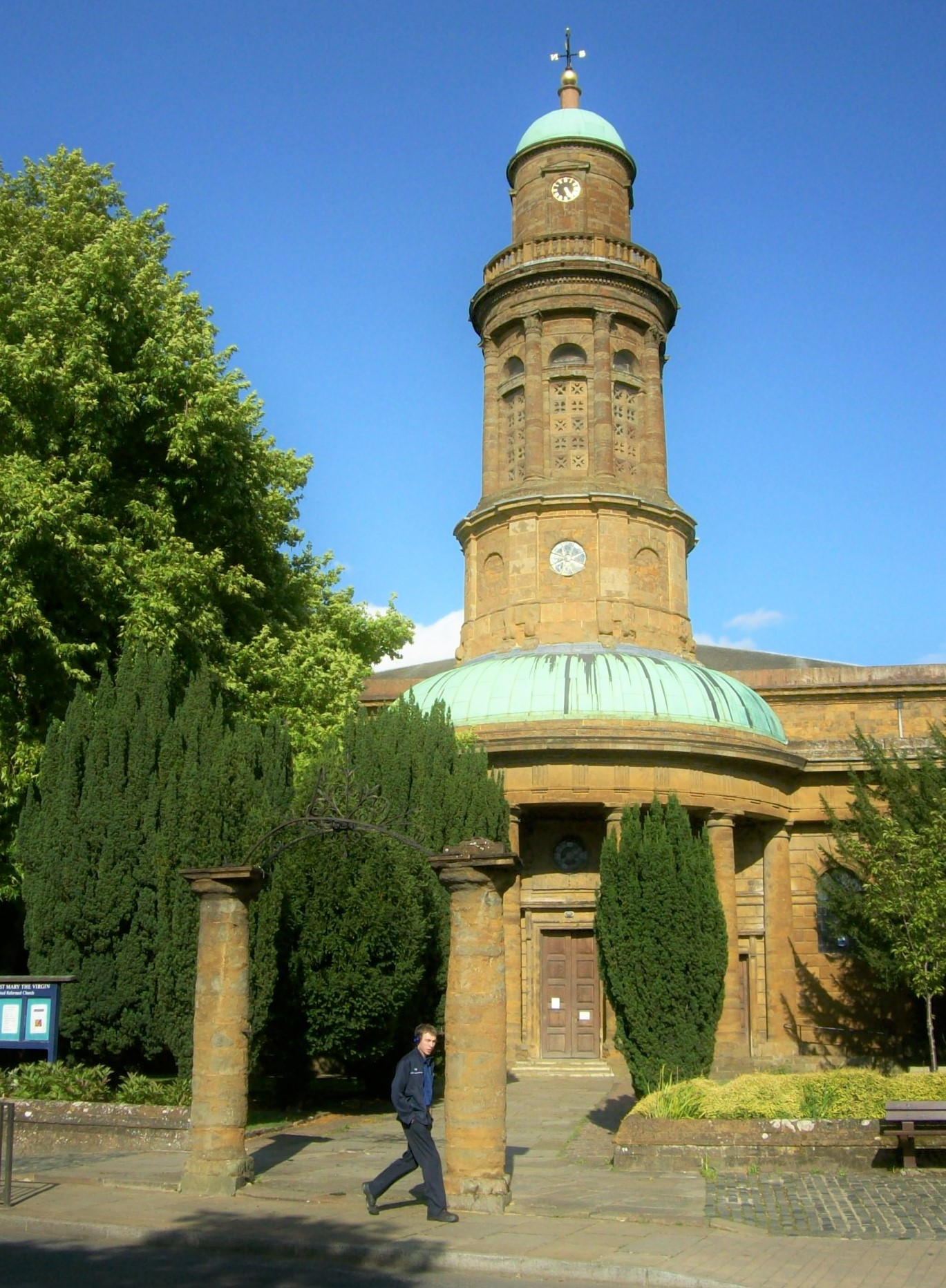
St Mary's parish church, built in the 1790s to replace a Medieval predecessor

In 1377 a pardon was given to a Welshman, who was wanted for killing another Welshman, after the accused person had taken sanctuary in St Mary's parish church. The Neithrop district of Banbury was the scene of rioting in 1589 after Neithrop's maypole was destroyed by Puritans.

Reverend William Whateley (1583–1639), whose father was several times bailiff or mayor of Banbury, was a notable Banbury vicar, who was instituted in 1610 but had already been a 'lecturer' there for some years. In 1626 Whateley refused communion to his own brother, who had been presented for religious incompetence. A report by the church wardens in 1619 said he was a well-liked and tolerant priest. The Quaker meeting house by the town centre lane called 'The Leys' was built between 1748 and 1750. In 1838, the Catholic St John the Evangelist Church was built, parts of it were designed by Augustus Pugin and it is a Grade II listed building.

In 1968, St. Joseph the Worker Catholic Church was built on Edmunds Road which was at first a mass centre for St. John's.

== Demographics ==
At the 2021 census there were 54,335 residents in the parish of Banbury, up from 46,853 in the 2011 census, and 41,801 in the 2001 census. The built up area (as defined by the Office for National Statistics) had a population of 52,045 in 2021.

In terms of ethnicity in 2021:

- 84.3% of Banbury residents were White
- 8.8% were Asian
- 2.3% were Black
- 3.1% were Mixed.
- 1.2% were from another ethnic group.

In terms of religion, 50.6% of Banbury residents identified as Christian, 40.0% said they had no religion, 6.9% were Muslim, 0.7% were Hindu, 0.6% were Sikh, 0.6% were Buddhists, and 0.6% were from another religion.

== Sport ==
Banbury has several sporting clubs, most notably Banbury United football club. There are also rugby (Banbury RUFC), canoeing, golf, running, triathlon and cricket clubs. These clubs represent a variety of age groups, and play at varying levels, from amateur to national. Banbury United F.C. was first formed as Spencer Villa in 1931 and their home matches were played at Middleton Road. At this time it was essentially a works club. In 1934, they changed their name to Banbury Spencer and moved to the Spencer Stadium.

Banbury and District Golf Club (now defunct) was founded in 1904. The club disappeared in the mid-1920s. A greyhound racing track was opened during the summer of 1951, one mile (1.6 km) north of Banbury town centre on the east side of Southam Road. The racing was independent (not affiliated to the sports governing body the National Greyhound Racing Club) known as a flapping track, which was the nickname given to independent tracks. The racing lasted until the latter part of 1954.

American Haas F1 Team European forward base of operation is located in Banbury after the collapse of Marussia F1. Manor Racing was formerly based in Banbury; its operating company entered administration in January 2017. A number of other motor racing teams have been based in and around Banbury, including Prodrive, Arden International, Mahindra Racing, Simtek and Virgin Racing.

== Twinning ==
Banbury is twinned with:

- Ermont in France, since 1982.
- Hennef in Germany, since 1981.

Twinning in Banbury began on 26 October 1978, at a public meeting held at the Post-Graduate Education Centre, and called on the initiative of the late Councillor Ron Smith, the then Town Mayor of Banbury. Initial visits between Banbury and Ermont in 1979, and for a long time after there was a period of informal relationship before a formal agreement was signed in 1982. Contact was first made with Hennef about a possible agreement in October 1980 and within a year the formal agreement was signed. As a consequence of this, two roads in Banbury (Hennef Way and Ermont Way) have been named after the two towns. Likewise a former railway station square in Hennef has been named Banburyplatz.

== Notable people ==
- Alfie Barbeary, rugby union player for Saracens.
- John Brooke-Little was a former officer of arms who lived in Banbury at the end of his life.
- Novelist Anthony Burgess taught at Banbury Grammar School (now Wykham Park Academy) for several years during the 1950s.
- Benjamin Geen was born in Banbury and employed as a staff nurse at the Horton General Hospital. During December 2003 and January 2004, Geen poisoned 17 patients for the thrill of trying to resuscitate them. He was found guilty of two murders and 15 charges of grievous bodily harm in April 2006.
- Gary Glitter, born in Banbury as Paul Francis Gadd; glam rock singer and convicted child sex offender.
- Rodney Gould, former Grand Prix motorcycle road racer and UK short circuit specialist, who was born in Banbury; he was the 250cc world champion in 1970.
- Larry Grayson, comedian and television presenter, was born in Banbury, but grew up in Nuneaton.
- Thomas Butler Gunn was a Banbury-born illustrator, writer and war correspondent.
- Richie Hawtin, electronic musician and DJ, was born in Banbury.
- Alan Hodgkin, British physiologist and biophysicist and Nobel Prize in Physiology or Medicine winner, was born in Banbury.
- Lancelot Holland, the admiral who was killed aboard HMS Hood in 1941 commanding the fleet that engaged the German battleship Bismarck, grew up in the Banbury area.
- Television hypnotist and hypnotherapist Chris Hughes was born in Banbury, but grew up in Ardley.
- Actress Jo Joyner (Tanya Branning in EastEnders) grew up in Bloxham and studied at the Warriner School.
- William Knollys, 1st Earl of Banbury, courtier.
- Prime Minister Lord North was MP for Banbury from 1754 to 1790.
- Javad Nurbakhsh, former Master of the Ni'matullāhī Sufi order, lived, died and was buried near Banbury.
- Tim Plester, actor, playwright and film maker, was born and grew up in Banbury.
- Chef and Hell's Kitchen star Gordon Ramsay moved to Banbury at the age of 16.
- Barrie Trinder, historian and industrial archaeologist, was born in Banbury.

== Arms ==
Coat of arms of Banbury
Notes Granted to the former borough council, 28 August 1951. Crest On a wreath of the colours mounted upon a horse passant Argent caparisoned Or and Gules a lady in Tudor costume Proper. Escutcheon Azure a sun in his splendour Or on a chief Ermine a castle of two towers between two pairs of swords points upwards in saltire Gules. Supporters On either side an Ox Gules armed and unguled Or gorged with a Collar Argent charged with a Bar wavy Azure. Motto Dominus Nobis Sol Et Scutum (The Lord Is Our Sun And Shield)

== See also ==
- Banbury cheese – a former cheese produced in Banbury that was once one of the town's most prestigious exports, its production went into decline by the 18th century, and it was eventually forgotten.
- Banbury Lido
- Banbury Rural District
- National Filling Factory, Banbury
- Crouch Hill, Banbury
