= Rainsborough =

Rainsborough, or spelling variations, may refer to:

- Thomas Rainsborough (1610–1648), Colonel in the English Civil War, brother of William Rainborowe
- William Rainborowe (died 1673), Captain and then Major in the English Civil War, brother of Thomas Rainsborough
- William Rainsborough (1587–1642), English Vice-Admiral in the Royal Navy, and ambassador, their father

== See also ==
- Rainsboro, Ohio
