= Banbury Lido =

Leisure centre in Oxfordshire

Coordinates: 52.061329°N 1.350425°W

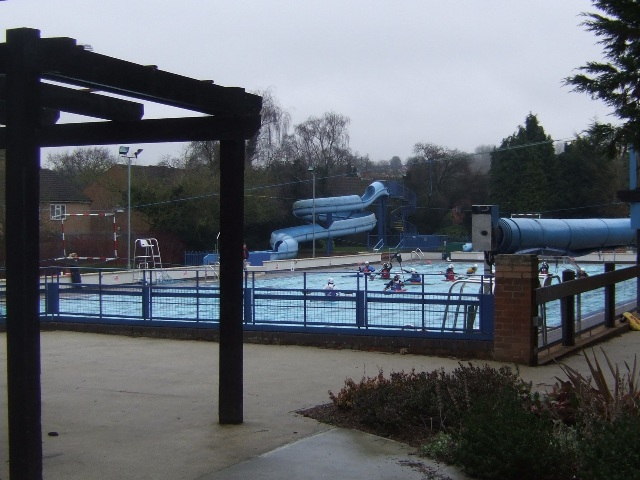
The lido

The Banbury Lido, also known as Woodgreen Lido and Banbury Open Air Pool, is an open-air swimming pool at Woodgreen Leisure Centre, Banbury, Oxfordshire, England.

== History ==
The lido was opened on 23 May 1939, after £7,900 was raised for building the pool, buildings and a complete layout. With its capacity of 356,000 gallons, the new 1939 pool, together with its surrounding complex, involved 23 contractors and sub contractors, using firms such as the London Brick Company and regional bodies such as Staffordshire, Worcestershire and Shropshire Power Company.

In 1999, to mark the 60th birthday of the Banbury Open Air Pool, a record turnout of nearly 1500 people visited over the Bank Holiday weekend.

The lido was closed from 2002 after various problems. In 2005 a campaign was developed to save the pool, led by the Open Air Pool Support Group. After rumours of planned permanent closure, a 10,000 name petition was collected to save the pool and a demo of an estimated 300 people outside the key council meeting resulted in postponing a decision and re-opening a debate.

In 2009 the pool was opened after Cherwell District Council and Banbury Town Council funded a refurbishment costing £1.5 million.

== Description ==
The lido is 50 m (160 ft) long and 18 m (59 ft) wide, meeting Olympic standards. An "Aqua Zone" for young children includes a refurbished flume. The co-located leisure centre has an indoor sports hall, fitness gym and fitness studio. The pool is heated and open over the summer season.

== Management and maintenance ==
Banbury Town Council contributes £50,000 a year to help with the running costs. Parkwood Community Leisure, which operates other Leisure Centres on behalf of Cherwell District Council, manages the Woodgreen Leisure Centre.

== See also ==
- Lido
- Banbury
