= Banbury Town Hall =

Municipal building in Banbury, Oxfordshire, England

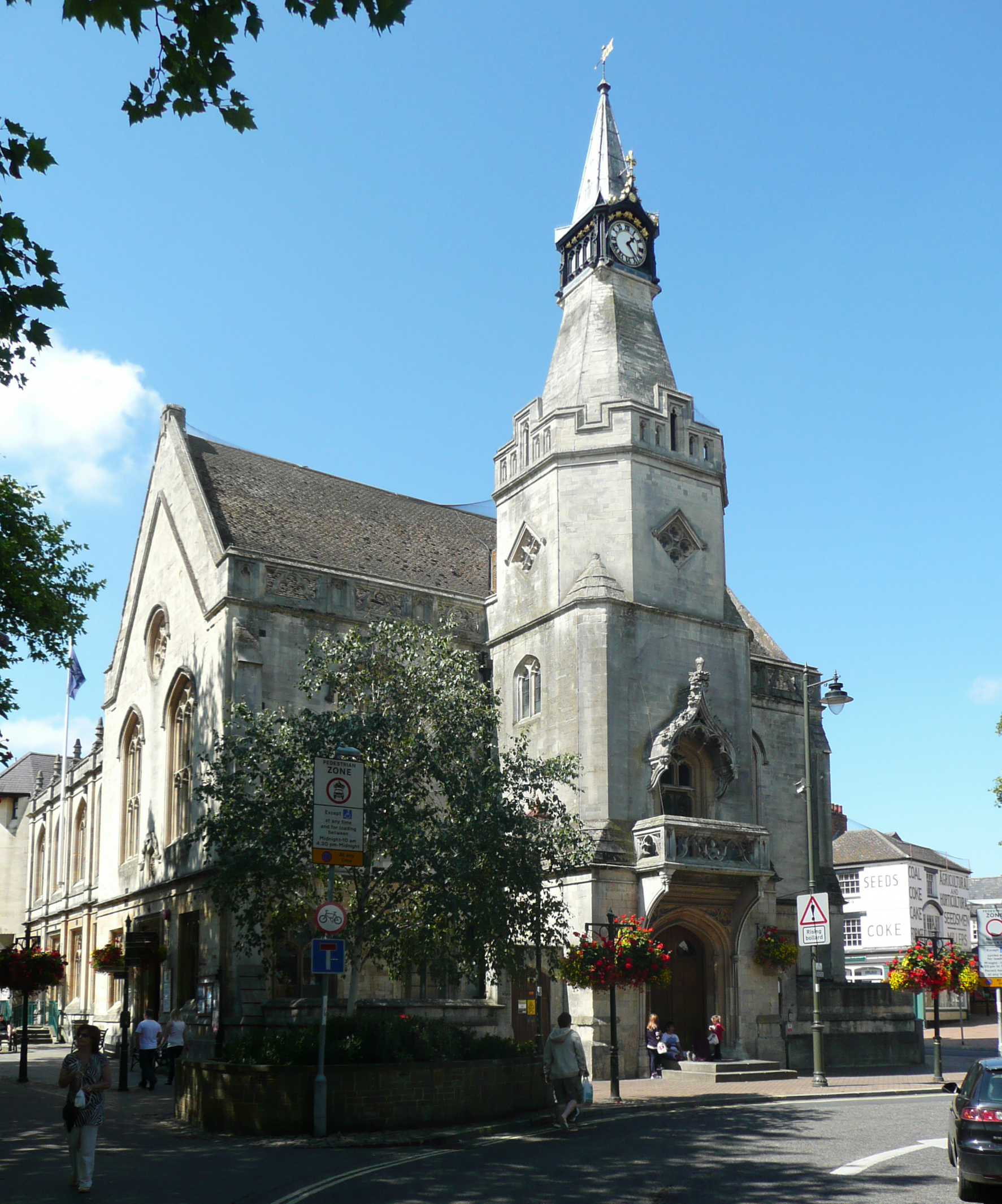
- Banbury Town Hall

- Shown in Oxfordshire
- 52.0621°N 1.3339°W
- Location: Banbury

History
- Built: 1854

Site notes
- Architect: Edward George Bruton
- Architectural style: Gothic Revival style

Listed Building – Grade II
- Designated: 7 October 1969
- Reference no.: 1369525

Banbury Town Hall is a municipal facility in the High Street in Banbury, Oxfordshire, England. The town hall, which was the headquarters of Banbury Borough Council from its completion in 1854 until 1930, is a Grade II listed building. It now serves as the headquarters of Banbury Town Council.

== History ==
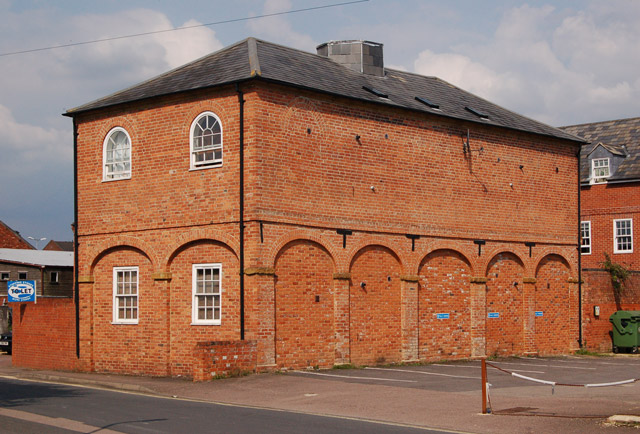
The old town hall on Lower Cherwell Street

The first town hall in the town was built in Cornhill in around 1590. It was replaced by a second town hall, constructed in timber, in the Market Place in around 1633 and followed by a third, more substantial structure, on the same site as the second building, in around 1790. The building was designed with arcading on the ground floor to allow markets to be held; an assembly room was established on the first floor.

After the anti-reformist, Heneage Legge was elected member of parliament for Banbury in November 1819 by the members of Banbury Corporation, who were the only people allowed to vote, there was rioting in the town centre: the windows in the town hall were broken and attempts were made to tear down the pillars supporting the first floor of the building. Following the passing of the Reform Act in 1832, a public procession and a fête were held on the town. After deciding, in the mid-19th century, that the Bridge Street area was in need of regeneration, civic leaders decided to procure a new town hall at the east end of the High Street. (Note: After it was vacated, the third town hall remained empty until it was dismantled in 1860 and moved to Lower Cherwell Street where it was used initially as a warehouse and later for residential purposes.)

The new building, which was designed by Edward George Bruton in the Gothic Revival style and built by Chesterman Brothers of Abingdon, was completed in October 1854. The design involved a symmetrical main frontage with three bays facing the junction of the High Street and Market Place; the central section, which projected forward, featured an arched doorway on the ground floor and a balcony with an ogee headed window on the first floor. A clock tower and spire were added in 1860; the clock was by Smith & Sons of Derby. The principal room was an assembly hall on the first floor. The building was extended to the south west to create a council chamber in 1891. The town hall was the headquarters of Banbury Borough Council until the council moved its administration to the mechanics' institute in Marlborough Road in 1930. The building remained in public ownership. A new Banbury Town Council was created in 2000, which now meets and has its offices in the town hall.

On 27 November 2008, Queen Elizabeth II, accompanied by the Duke of Edinburgh, visited the town hall and unveiled a plaque commemorating the 400th anniversary of the granting of the town's charter.

Works of art in the town hall include a painting depicting Ancient Rome by Giovanni Paolo Panini, a painting depicting columns in an Italianate landscape by Claude Lorrain and a painting depicting the judgement of Midas by Luca Giordano. There are also portraits of Prince Rupert of the Rhine by Johannes Mytens and of the parliamentarian, John Hampden, by Godfrey Kneller.
