= Sonia Rolt =

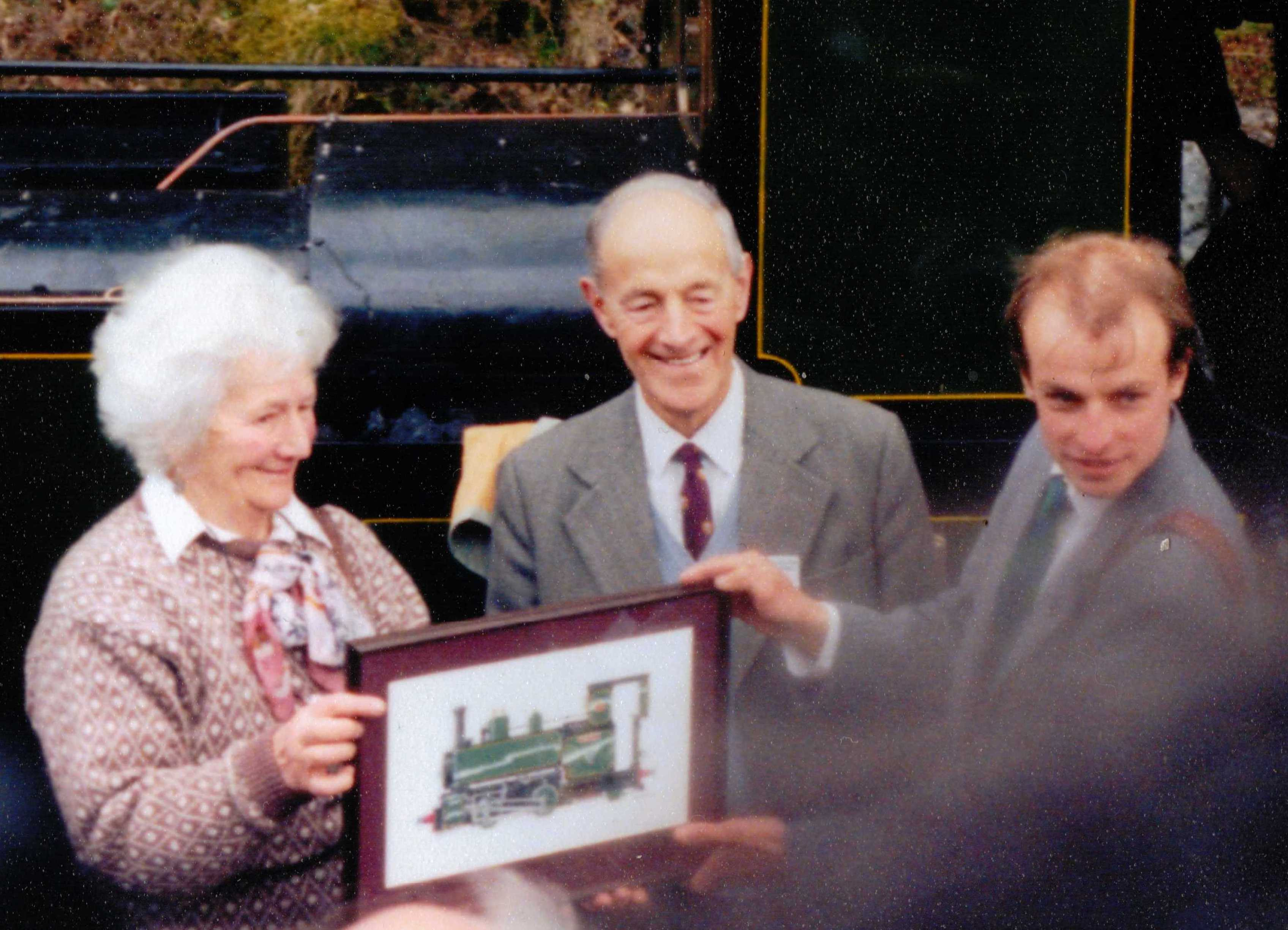
Sonia Rolt, at the naming of Tom Rolt, named after her late husband, May 1991

Sonia Rolt OBE (née South; 15 April 1919 – 22 October 2014) was a campaigner for the Inland Waterways Association (IWA) of Great Britain and was made an Officer of the Order of the British Empire in 2010 for her services to industrial archaeology and heritage.

At the beginning of World War II she volunteered to work on the canals. After the war she became active on the council of the new Inland Waterways Association campaigning for the retention of the canals. Subsequently she married one of the founders, Tom Rolt, and after his death became a vice-president of the Association.

== Early life ==
Born Sonia South in New York to British parents, she trained as an actress at the London Theatre Studio. During the Second World War, she volunteered to work on the canals and joined the tough life of the boatmen, mainly carrying coal and steel between Midlands factories and coal pits. Because of the "IW" badge the women who worked on the canals wore, they were named the Idle Women by the canal men, an insult they adopted with pride. She met and married, in 1945, a handsome but illiterate boatman called George Smith who had spent all his life on the canals, and got to know much of the lore and culture of the boatmen, including the ghost stories. When the Inland Waterways Association was established by Tom Rolt and Robert Aickman in 1946, she took part in the first delegation to the Ministry of Transport and became a member of the council. In 1950 she worked with Tom Rolt on a report on the working conditions of boatmen but this was not a priority for the IWA which was mainly concerned with the leisure use of the canals, and indirectly led to her exclusion from the organisation together with Rolt.

== Marriage to Tom Rolt ==
When Tom Rolt left the waterways to return to his childhood home at Stanley Pontlarge, he also parted from his first wife, Angela. Rolt recounts that after a trade union meeting on behalf of working boaters he was having a cup of tea in "some squalid Birmingham cafe" with Sonia when "I looked up from my plate to find Sonia regarding me with the deepest compassion and tenderness". Some months later towards the end of 1951, Sonia wrote to him that she had decided to leave the waterways and Tom invited her to join him for a week's walking in Shropshire, which he described as "the most memorable week of my life".

After her marriage to George Smith broke up, Sonia and Tom married and settled at Stanley Pontlarge and had two sons whilst Tom was writing the biographies of engineers that made him famous, eventually rescuing him from the financial problems that had peaked at this time. She restored the house and became active with the Landmark Trust becoming their furnishing manager and looking after libraries.

She also worked with Tom on the preservation of Talyllyn Railway.

== Later years ==
After Tom's death in 1974, the breach with the IWA was gradually healed by her being given an honorary membership in 1983 and her appointment as a vice president in 1993. She edited Tom's autobiographical trilogy, The Landscape Trilogy and published A Canal People, The Photographs of Robert Longden in 1997. She also worked with the Society for the Protection of Ancient Buildings, National Trust and advised on the restoration of old ships.
