= Boatwomen's training scheme =

The boatwomen's training scheme was an initiative in the United Kingdom during the Second World War to attract women to work on Britain's canal network. Initiated by the Grand Union Canal Carrying Company (GUCCC) in 1942 the scheme was taken over by the Ministry of War Transport in 1944. The scheme closed after the end of hostilities in 1945. Nicknamed the Idle Women, due to the capital letters IW on the Inland Waterways badge they wore in lieu of a uniform, it is estimated that approximately 100 women joined the scheme but only about 45 completed the training and only six are recorded as having participated throughout the length of the scheme.

== Background ==
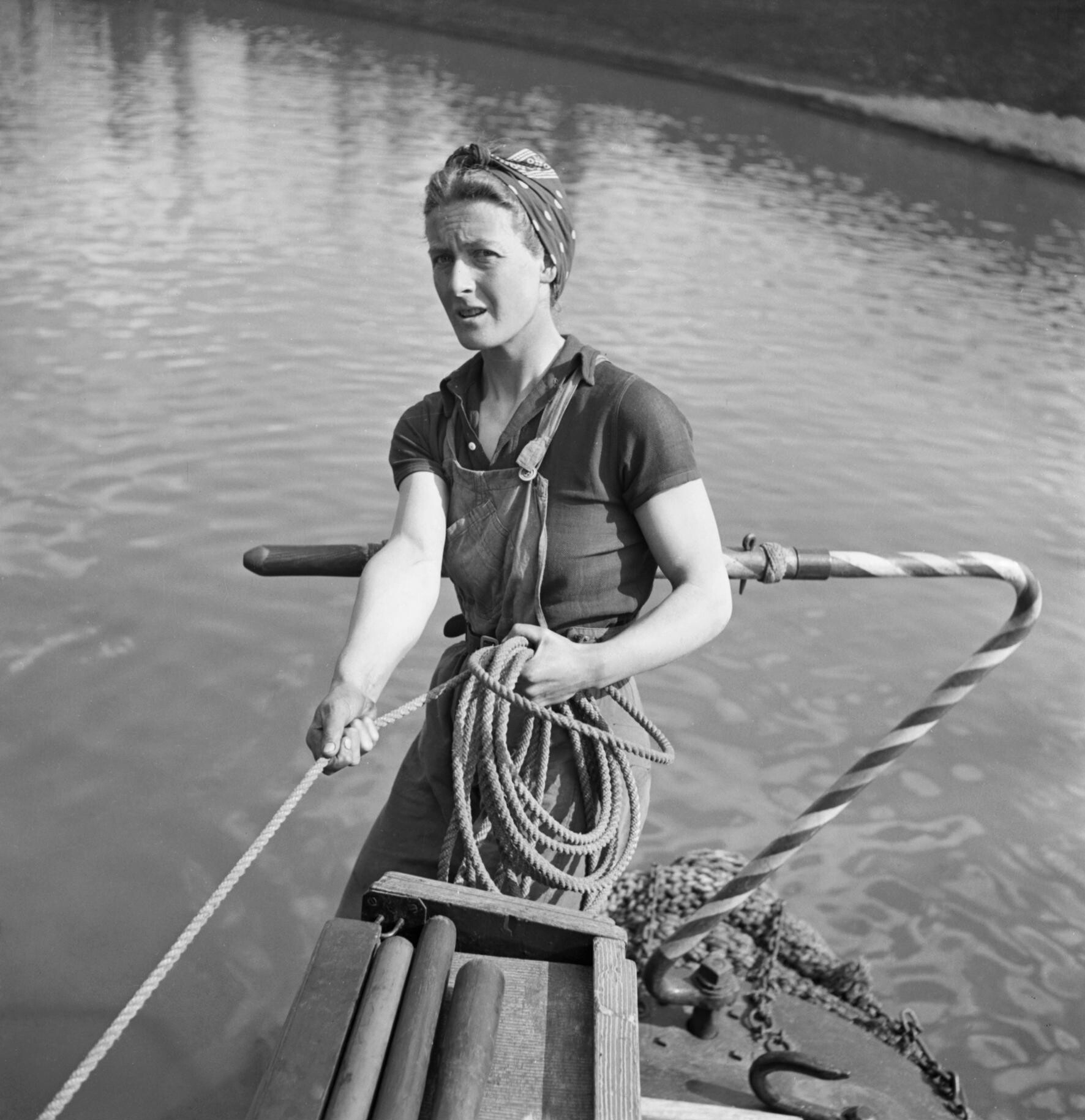
Daphne March on board her boat Heather Bell in 1942

In the early part of the Second world war Britain's canals suffered from a labour shortage, caused mostly by military service (although until 1942 being a waterways boatman was a reserved occupation) and the higher wages available in other employment. A recruiting drive in 1941 did attract some men to the waterways but the GUCCC noted that they also received 47 applications from women, offers they refused stating that unless the women were members of boating families already employed on the canal, their services could not be utilised.

Late in 1941 the Ministry of War Transport wrote to boaters Daphne March and Frances Traill who had been using March's own boat, Heather Bell, to transport cargo since 1940 to see if the pair would work with the GUCCC to train women to work the boats. March and Traill agreed and brought in Eily "Kit" Gayford, a former ballet dancer, to help. The GUCCC was one of two companies the ministry had approached and while the GUCCC has responded positively the other company, the Severn and Canal Carrying Company declined the opportunity stating that "to work canal boats by female labour entirely [was] not a practical proposition."

== Training ==
Adverts were placed in national newspapers in early 1942 and the first trainees started work in May 1942. Mostly middle class applicants, training consisted of two trainees working alongside Marsh, Traill or Gayford in charge of two canal boats, a powered or 'motor' narrowboat and an unpowered 'butty boat' which was towed by the motor boat. Two trips were made normally between London and Birmingham or Oxford carrying grain, coal or metal ingots. The first trip was for the trainees to see if they could adapt to the hard conditions and way of life and if they stuck with it, the second trip gave a more thorough grounding in the work before the women were assigned to their own boats. The training took about six weeks before the women were considered competent enough to work their own boats.

The training included how to work the boats, operating locks, loading and unloading cargo, and the geography of the canals.

== Pay and conditions ==
During their training each woman was paid £2 per week rising to a minimum of £3 per week once qualified. The actual amount depended on the earnings of the boat based on tonnage carried split between the three women crew members. No uniform was provided, the GUCCC provided a list of items needed but the women had to provide this themselves. The only indication of their status was a National Service badge with IW for Inland Waterways on it. It was this IW badge that led to the women being called Idle Women by boatmen but the nickname stuck and the women proudly adopted it.

Once qualified unpaid leave of 3 to 6 days was allowed after every second trip. No additional rations were provided, in contrast to other national service organisations such at the Women's Land Army but arrangements were made for the women to be able to use their ration books at any shop rather than being tied to shops in a particular location.

Working seven days a week and often for 18–20 hours a day the work was considered hard and arduous by most of the women.

== Ministry of War Transport administration ==
The Ministry of War Transport (MWT) took over administration of the scheme in 1944. Part of the MWT was the expansion of the scheme to other canals. One crew of three were employed for a short while on the Gloucester and Sharpness Canal using a horse-drawn boat. The MWT also managed to get Canal Transport Limited, a major carrier on the Leeds and Liverpool Canal to utilise women crews but only eight women had been trained, with a further four in training, before the end of the war in Europe made the scheme of limited value and duration.

== End of the scheme ==
Work on the Grand Union canal continued until after VJ day but shortly after the women found that there was no further work for them and they were unemployed and free to go. It is estimated that at its peak 45 women were working on the Grand Union canal crewing between 15–30 boats.

== Memorials ==
A plaque to the women was unveiled at the Canal Museum at Stoke Bruerne in Northamptonshire in 2008. There have been three stage productions based on the experiences of the women; Mikron Theatre presented Imogen's War in 1992 and Alarum Theatre produced Isobel's War and Idle Women and Judies in 2016. Several trainees wrote books about their time as trainees.

== Notable trainees ==
- Olga Kevelos
- Sonia Rolt
- Emma Smith

== Sources ==
- Hately-Broad, Barbara & Moore, Bob (2014). "Idle Women:Challenging gender stereotypes on Britain's inland waterways during the Second World War". In Andrews, Maggie & Lomas, Janis (eds.). The Home Front in Britain:Images, myths and forgotten experiences since 1914. Palgrave Macmillan. pp. 201–216. ISBN 978-1-137-34897-5.
- Conway-Jones, Hugh (1990). Working Life on Severn & Canal. Sutton. ISBN 978-0862997458.
- Savage, C.I. (1955). Inland Transport. HMSO.
- Woolfitt, Susan (1986) [1946]. Idle Women (2nd ed.). M & M Baldwin. ISBN 0-947712-03-8.
