= Stanley Pontlarge =

Village in Gloucestershire, England

Coordinates: 51.971°N 2.006°W

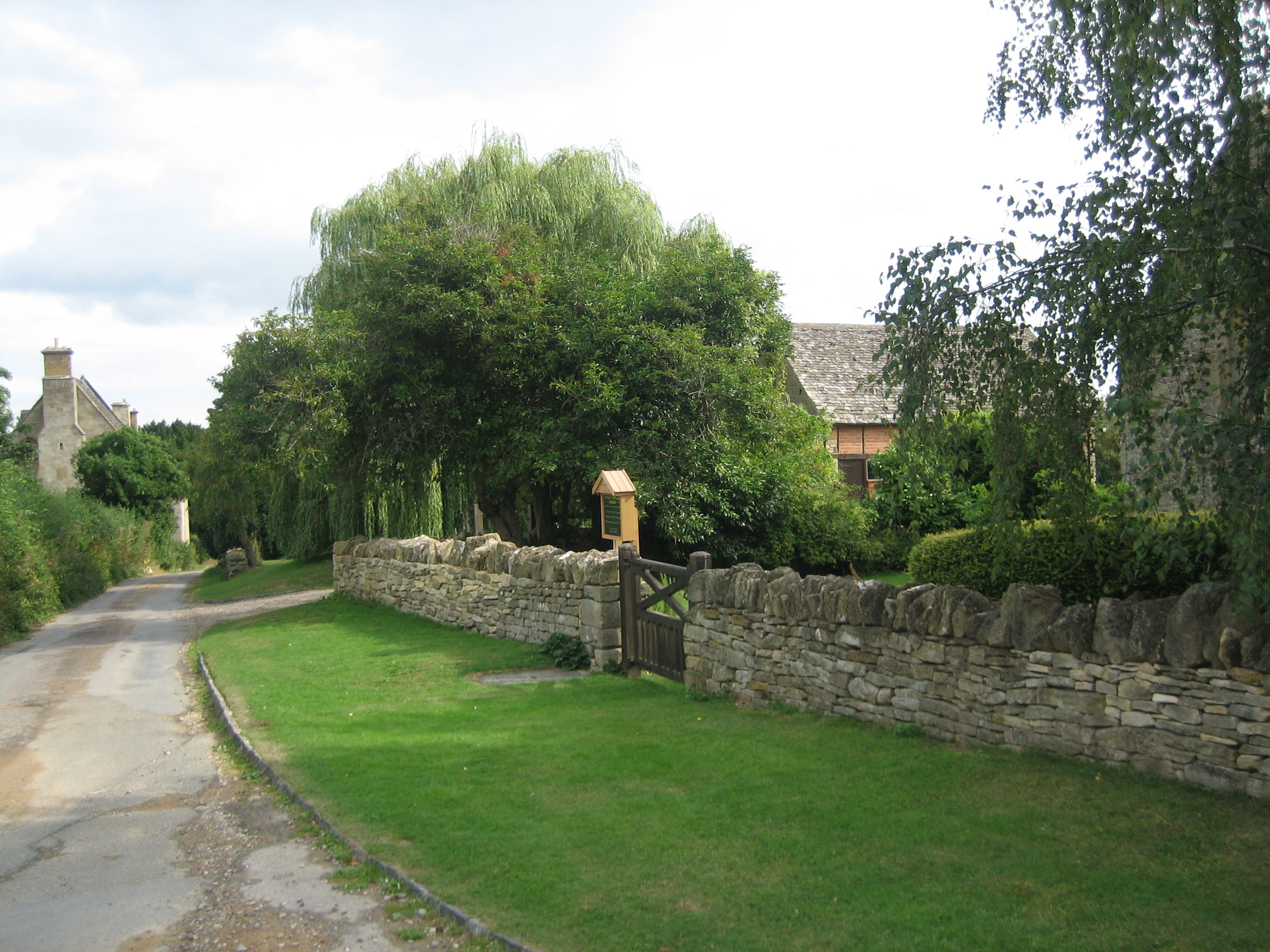
- Looking down the lane from the church towards the main road. The gable of the 14th century house (The Cottage) in mid-distance

- Location within Gloucestershire
- Civil parish: Prescott
- District: Tewkesbury
- Shire county: Gloucestershire
- Region: South West
- Country: England
- Sovereign state: United Kingdom
- Post town: CHELTENHAM
- Postcode district: GL54
- Dialling code: 01242

Stanley Pontlarge is a village and former civil parish, now in the civil parish of Prescott and the ecclesiastical parish of Winchcombe, in the Tewkesbury district, in the county of Gloucestershire, England. Stanley Pontlarge lies on the steep northern escarpment of the Cotswolds. The Gloucestershire Warwickshire Railway is a prominent feature of the landscape. In 1931 the parish had a population of 43.

== History ==
The village was mentioned in the Domesday Book of 1086, when it was referred to as "Stanlege".

In 1310 Stanley Pontlarge became part of the parish of Toddington. In 1386 the parish became a possession of Hailes Abbey, but when the abbey was dissolved in 1539 the parish of Toddington with Stanley Pontlarge became a normal parish with a vicar. In 1866 Stanley Pontlarge became a separate civil parish, but on 1 April 1935 the civil parish was abolished and absorbed into the civil parish of Prescott.

== Church ==
The village has a small church, whose original dedication is unknown. The church was probably built by Roger Little, who in about 1175 had married Margery, the daughter of John de Sudeley, and built the adjacent moated manor house. The original Norman structure was heavily restored by Thomas Collins in 1860-61. The chancel was rebuilt. The church is noted for its Late Norman north door, with chevron mouldings, and a Norman chancel arch, leaning outwards, also with chevron moulding. The nave roof was rebuilt in 1923-4 by Sir Philip Stott. The font is a Norman bowl, remodelled into an octagonal shape in the 14th century. Most of the furnishings in the church date to the 1860-1 restoration. By agreement among the parishioners, graves in the churchyard are not marked by headstones. A guide to the location of burials is provided within the church.

== The Cottage ==
The Cottage is 14th century in origin, probably built as a priest's house by Hailes Abbey after 1387, when the abbey was granted the living of Toddington and Stanley Pontlarge. Massive cruck trusses survive in the attic. The exterior of the house is 16th century in appearance, although the windows may date to the restoration by Thomas Collins in 1873. The Cottage was bought in 1921 by Lionel Rolt, and became the home of the writers Tom and Sonia Rolt in the 1950s. The house, and life in the surrounding countryside, are described in detail in Rolt's two volumes of autobiography Landscape with machines and Landscape with figures. Tom Rolt is buried in the churchyard.

A variety of agricultural structures and overhead wires were removed by the Landmark Trust in the 1970s.

== Gallery ==
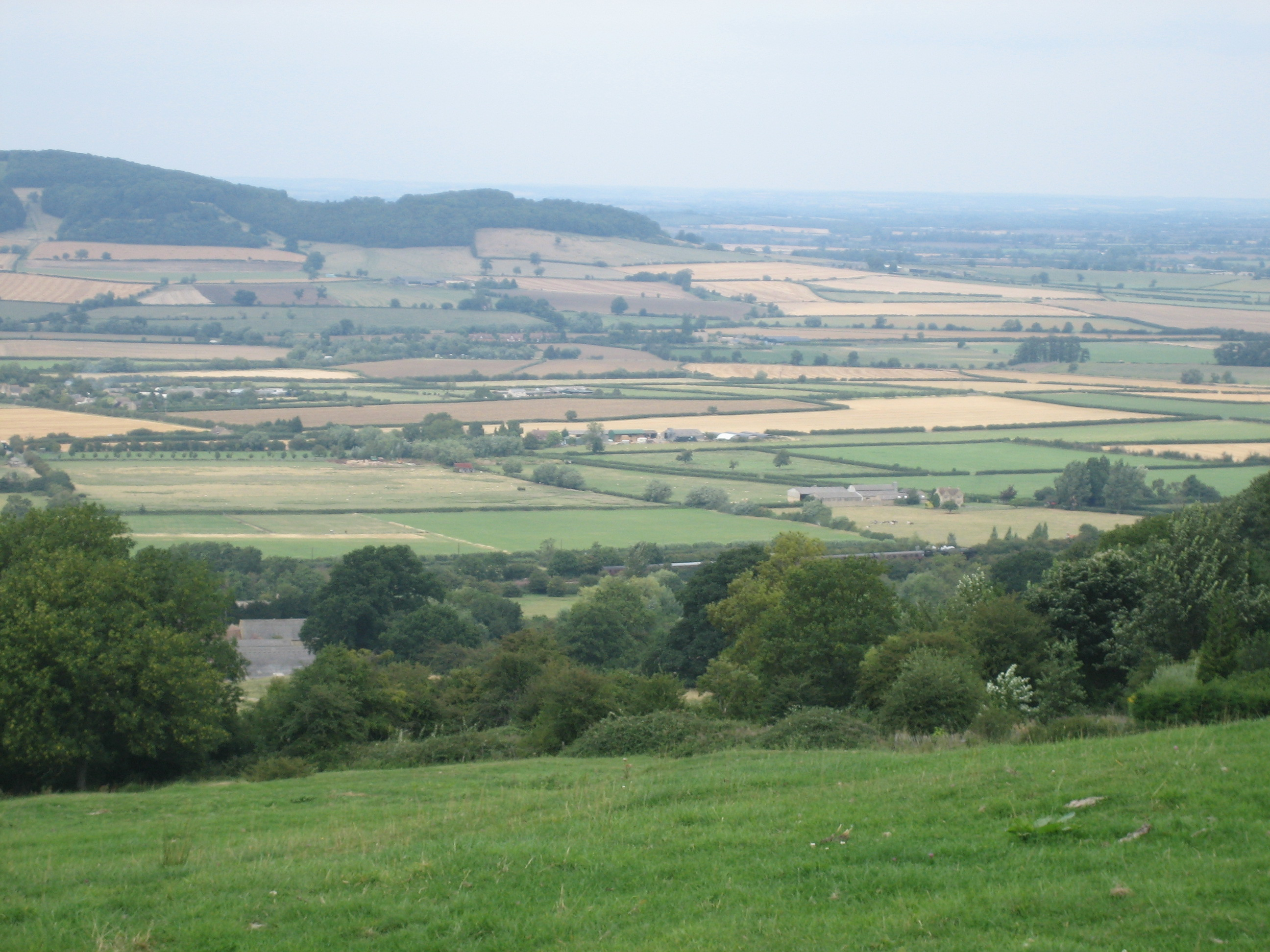
Fields at Stanley Pontlarge viewed from Langley Hill. Looking north to the Vale of Evesham. Note the steam train on the railway

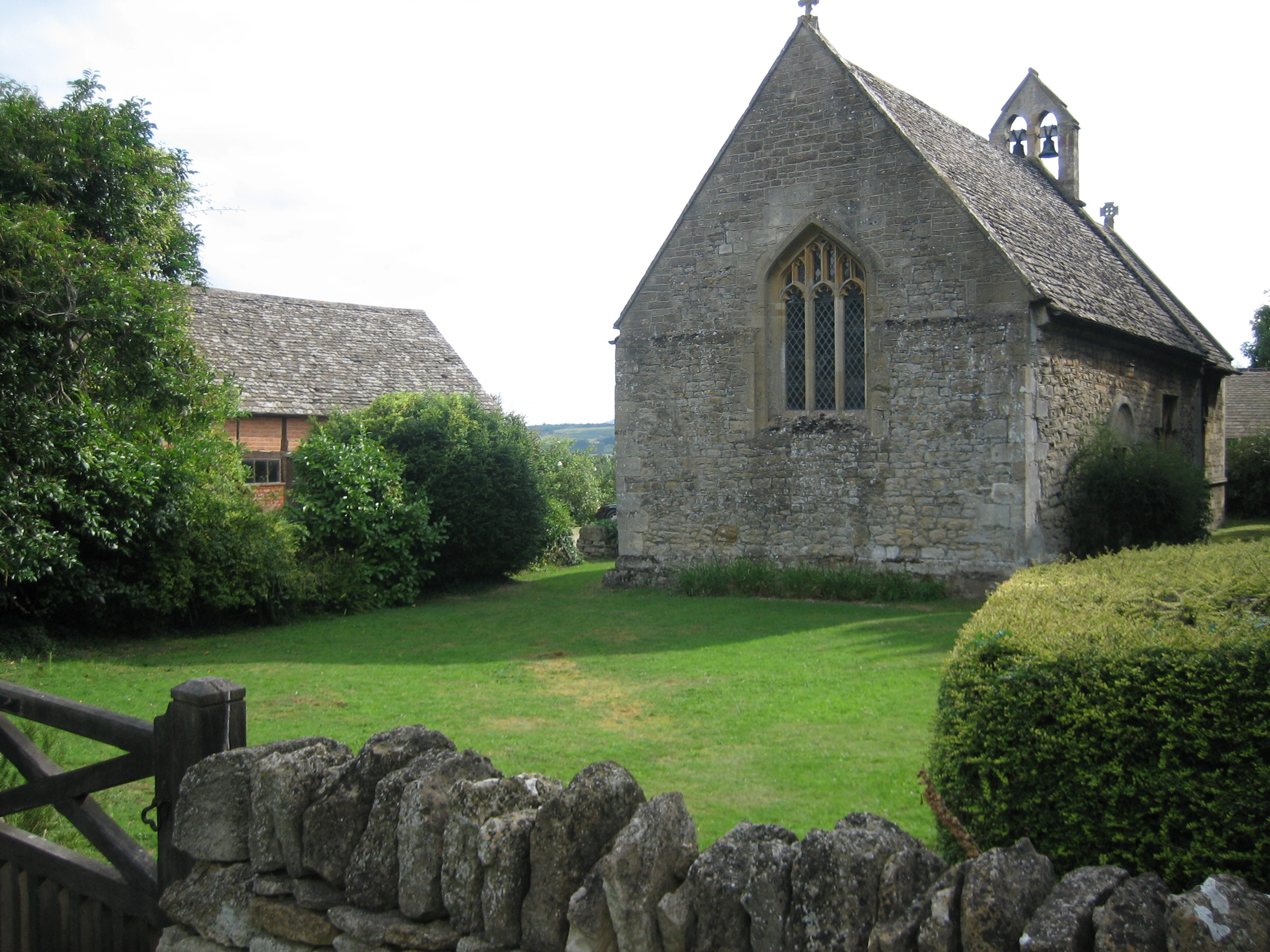
Church viewed from the west

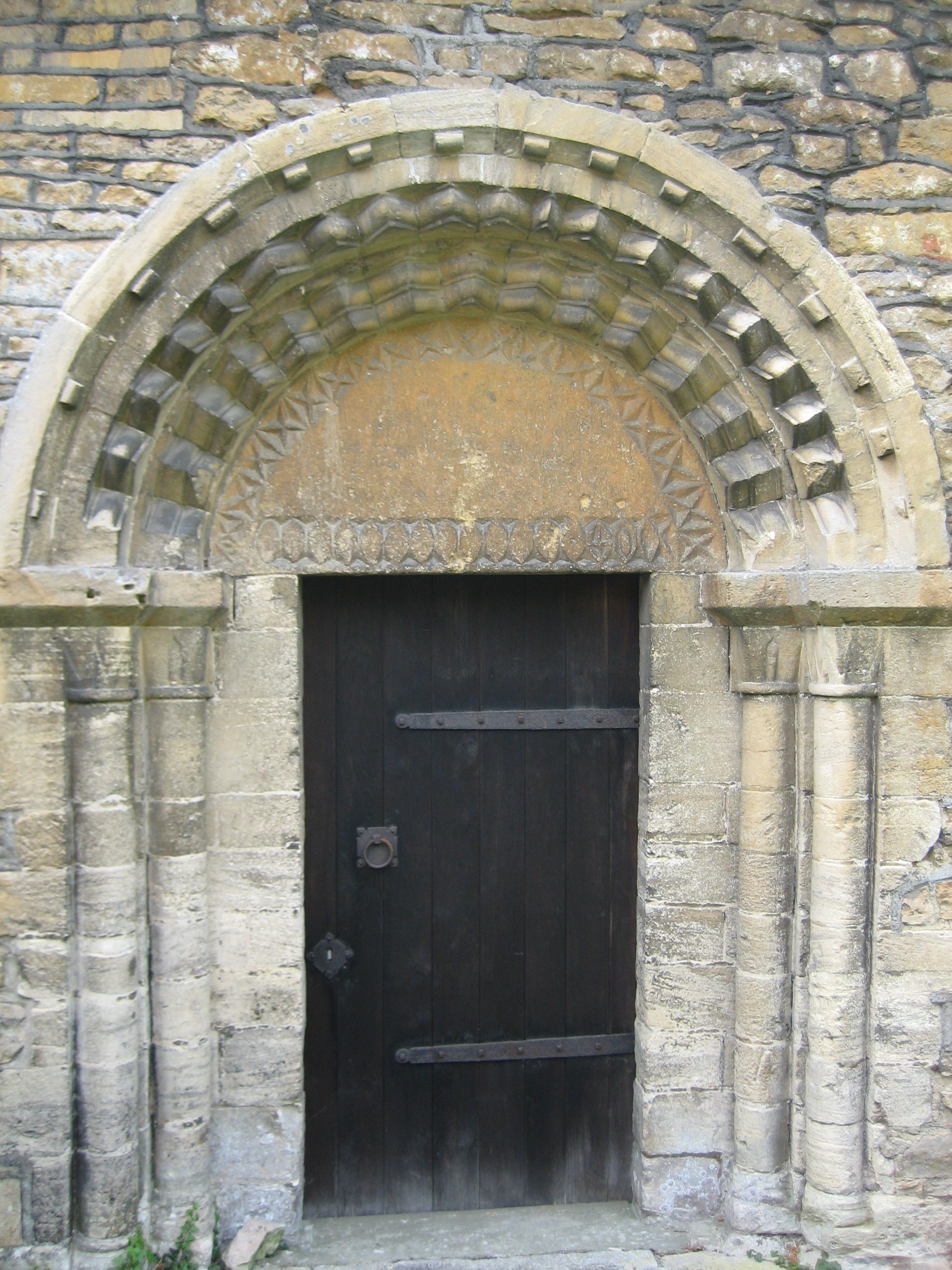
The Norman door of the church

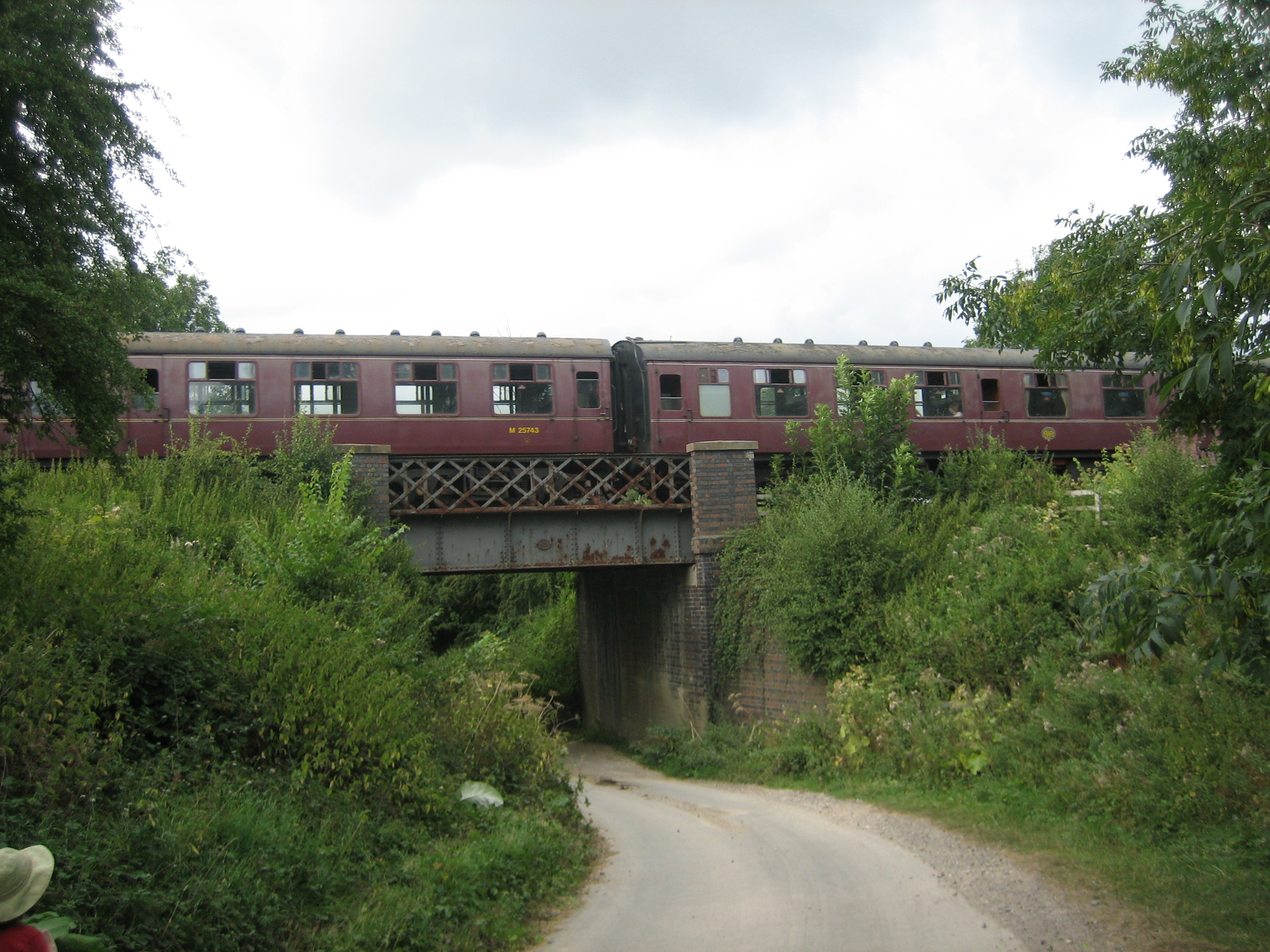
Train crossing the bridge over the lane

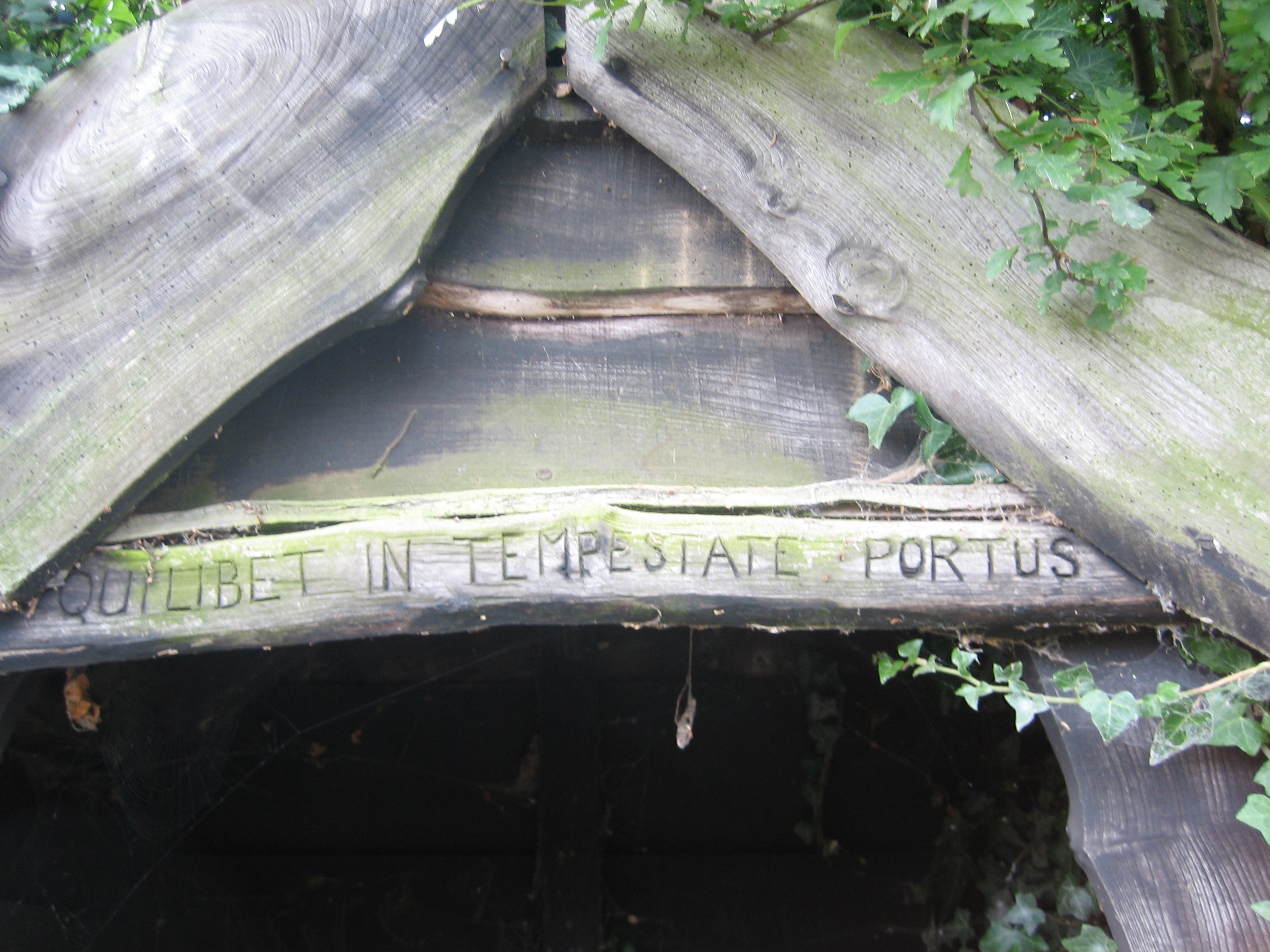
Bus shelter at junction of lane and main road, bearing the Latin inscription "Quilibet in tempestate portus" (A harbour in a storm for anyone)
