= Narrow Boat (book) =

1944 book by L. T. C. Rolt

- First edition
- Author: L. T. C. Rolt
- Illustrator: Denys Watkins-Pitchford
- Publisher: Eyre & Spottiswoode
- Publication date: 1944
- Publication place: United Kingdom
- Pages: 212
- ISBN: 978-0752451091

Narrow Boat is a book about life on the English canals written by L. T. C. Rolt. Originally published in 1944 by Eyre & Spottiswoode, it has continuously been in print since.

It describes a four-month trip that Rolt took with his bride Angela at the outbreak of the Second World War. The book is credited with a revival of interest in the English canals, leading directly to the creation of the Inland Waterways Association, which advocated for the restoration and leisure use of the canals.

== Synopsis ==
Part One is a general introduction to the English Canal system. He points out at the outset that "most people today know no more of the canals than they do of the old green roads which the pack-horse trains once travelled." It has an account of converting the wooden narrowboat Cressy for liveaboard use at Tooley's Boatyard in Banbury. He paid particular attention to the traditional narrowboat decorations of Roses and Castles and the installation of a short bath, unusual even now on narrowboats.

In Part Two 'on an afternoon of the last week in July' [1939] Tom and Angela set out up the Oxford Canal and into a different world of contours and canal pubs where boat captains with gold rings in their ears play games apart from their wives. They follow the Grand Union Canal to Market Harborough and north through Leicester to the Trent and Shardlow, where the scene in the Canal Tavern 'would have delighted Hogarth or Rabelais'.

They make their way up the Trent and Mersey Canal through the Potteries before emerging into the rural landscape of Church Minshull where they stay and enjoy the English countryside.

Part Three starts with Rolt converting his petrol engine to run on paraffin, because of the shortage of petrol caused by the war. They start the journey south, encountering the horse fair at Market Drayton, a market town. Having reached Autherley Junction they turned back on the Coventry Canal to use the whole length of the Oxford Canal, avoiding the lockage and industrial scenes of Birmingham. The voyage ends as they near Oxford.

== Publication and reception ==
Rolt, who had worked with engines all his life until then, settled down to write the account of his voyage as he worked at a foundry near Hungerford. His manuscript was rejected by all the London publishers and an agent to whom he offered it. It wasn't until 1943 that his friendship with H. J. Massingham gave him the introduction he needed to get it published, in 1944.

The book arrived at the right time to a nation growing weary of war. It was well-reviewed, and it was not long before the first printing sold out, although with the shortage of paper at the end of the war a new printing had to wait for some months. Sir Compton Mackenzie described it as "an elegy of classic restraint unmarred by any trace of sentiment. His pen is as sure as the brush of a Cotman. Narrow Boat will go on the shelf with White and Cobbett and Hudson".

Rolt started to receive fan mail on his boat at Tardebigge. The most significant was from an address in Bloomsbury, signed by Robert Aickman, suggesting the formation of a voluntary society to campaign for the greater use of the canals. As a result, a meeting was held at which the Inland Waterways Association was formed, attracting such notables as A. P. Herbert and Lord Methuen.

== See also ==
- Canals of the United Kingdom
- History of the British canal system
