= Olga Kevelos =

British motorcycle racer

- Nationality: (United Kingdom) British
- Born: 6 November 1923; Edgbaston, Birmingham, England
- Died: 28 October 2009 (aged 86)

Olga Kevelos (6 November 1923 – 28 October 2009) was an English Motorcycle trials and enduro rider who won a gold medal at the International Six-Day Trial.

== Early life ==
Olga Kevelos was born on 6 November 1923 in Edgbaston, Birmingham, to a Greek father and English mother. Her father worked in the Birmingham Stock Exchange. She was educated at King Edward VI High School for Girls where she excelled at metallurgy and astronomy. She then studied metallurgy, and at the beginning of the Second World War, worked in the laboratories of William Mills, manufacturer of the Mills bomb. She then worked for a time at the Royal Observatory but enemy bombing soon forced its closure and she was evacuated to Bath. She did not enjoy the clerical work and applied to the Department of War Transport when she saw an advert for women trainees to man canal barges.

== Inland Waterways in the Second World War ==
Kevelos was one of the women who during the Second World War were recruited from 1943 to 1945 to work narrowboats on the Grand Union Canal between Birmingham and London, as part of the Boatwomen's training scheme. The women wore badges with the initials "I.W." for "Inland Waterways". The wearers were nicknamed 'Idle Women'. After the Second World War Kevelos studied in Paris but returned to the Midlands and later moved to King's Sutton in Northamptonshire.

== Racing career ==
In 1950 Kevelos won her gold medal, riding a 500cc Norton Manx in the International Six-Day Trials in Wales. She was to ride with varying degrees of success in every Scottish Six Days Trial until she finally retired from the sport in 1970, and in every International Six-Day Trial until 1966. During her competition career she secured support from almost every major British motorcycle manufacturer, and from the Italian and Czech manufacturers Parilla and Jawa.

== Later life ==
Olga Kevelos eventually gave up racing and for 26 years helped her younger brother Ray to run his pub, the Three Tuns, at King's Sutton, south Northamptonshire.

In 1978 she participated in BBC's Mastermind, with Genghis Khan as her specialist subject. Her expertise on the Mongolian Emperor was also a topic of interest for former Prime Minister, Tony Blair, who reportedly asked her about the topic at a Foreign Office reception. She later joked, "He probably wanted a few tips on how to invade other people’s countries successfully".
