= L. T. C. Rolt =

English historian and biographer

Tom Rolt
- Born: Lionel Thomas Caswall Rolt; 11 February 1910; Chester, Cheshire, England
- Died: 9 May 1974 (aged 64)
- Resting place: Stanley Pontlarge, Gloucestershire, England
- Education: Cheltenham College
- Occupations: Engineer; technical assistant; writer
- Spouse(s): Angela Orred (1939–1951); Sonia Smith (1952–1974)
- Children: Richard (1953), Timothy (1955)
- Relatives: Lionel Rolt (father)
- Writing career
- Period: 1944–1974
- Genres: Industrial history, Biography, Ghost stories
- Subjects: Railways, waterways, industrial history
- Notable works: Narrow Boat, Winterstoke (1954), Railway Adventure, Red for Danger, Isambard Kingdom Brunel, Thomas Telford, George and Robert Stephenson, The Landscape Trilogy (autobiography)
- Notable awards: Hon MA Newcastle University, Hon MSc University of Bath
- Website: www.ltcrolt.org.uk

Lionel Thomas Caswall Rolt (usually abbreviated to Tom Rolt or L. T. C. Rolt) (11 February 1910 – 9 May 1974) was a prolific English writer and the biographer of major civil engineering figures, including Isambard Kingdom Brunel and Thomas Telford. He is also regarded as one of the pioneers of the leisure cruising industry on Britain's inland waterways, and was an enthusiast for vintage cars and heritage railways. He played a pioneering role in both the canal and railway preservation movements.

== Biography ==
=== Early life ===
Tom Rolt was born in Chester to a line of Rolts "dedicated to hunting and procreation". His father Lionel had settled back in Britain in Hay-on-Wye after working on a cattle station in Australia and a plantation in India, and joining (unsuccessfully) in the Klondike Gold Rush of 1898. However, Lionel Rolt lost most of his money in 1920 after investing his capital in a company that failed, and the family moved to a pair of stone cottages in Stanley Pontlarge in Gloucestershire.

Rolt studied at Cheltenham College and at the age of 16 he took a job learning about steam traction, before starting an apprenticeship at the Kerr Stuart locomotive works in Stoke-on-Trent, where his uncle, Kyrle Willans, was chief development engineer. His uncle bought a wooden horse-drawn narrow flyboat called Cressy and fitted it with a steam engine. Then, having discovered that the steam made steering through tunnels impossible, he replaced the engine with a Ford Model T engine. This was Rolt's introduction to the canal system.

=== Cars ===
After Kerr Stuart went into liquidation in 1930, Rolt became jobless and turned to vintage sports cars, taking part in the veteran run to Brighton, and acquiring a succession of cars including a 1924 Alvis 12/50 two seater "duck's back" that he kept for the rest of his life.

Rolt bought into a motor garage partnership next to the Phoenix public house in Hartley Wintney in Hampshire. Its breakdown vehicle was an adapted 1911 Rolls-Royce Silver Ghost. Together with the landlord of the Phoenix, Tim Carson, and others, Rolt formed the Vintage Sports-Car Club in 1934. He also founded the Prescott hill climb. His 1950 book Horseless Carriage contains a diatribe against the emergence of mass production in the English car industry, claiming that "mass production methods must develop towards the ultimate end [of automatic procreation of machines by machines], although by doing so, they involve either the supersession of men by machines or a continual expansion of production". His preference for traditional craftsmanship helps to explain his subsequent career.

=== Cressy ===
In 1936 Kyrle Willans bought back Cressy, which he had earlier sold, and several trips on the waterways convinced Rolt that he wanted a life afloat. He persuaded Angela Orred to join him in this idyll. She was a young blonde in a white polo-necked sweater who had swept into his garage in an Alfa Romeo in 1937, and been caught up in the vintage car scene. Rolt bought Cressy from his uncle and set about converting her into a boat that could be lived on, the most notable addition being a bath.

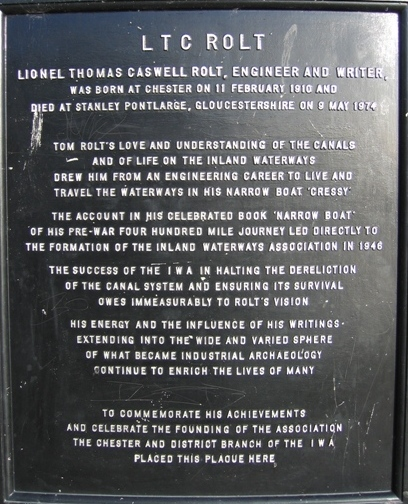
Chester memorial plaque

During the summer of 1939 Rolt and Angela decided to defy her father's objections and married in secret on 11 July. Work on Cressy was completed at Tooley's Boatyard in Banbury, and on 27 July Rolt and his wife set off up the Oxford Canal.

=== War ===
The outbreak of the Second World War intervened and Rolt, a pacifist at heart, immediately signed up at the Rolls-Royce factory at Crewe to work on the production line of the Spitfire's Merlin engine. He was saved from the tedium of the production line by the offer of a job with the Aldbourne Engineering Company, Wiltshire. The Rolts headed south in Cressy through storms, reaching Banbury a day before the canals were frozen over for the winter.

In March 1940 the Rolts negotiated the River Thames in flood and headed up the River Kennet to reach Hungerford, near Aldbourne. Rolt then worked there for more than a year.

The Rolts' first four-month cruise was described in a book that Rolt initially called Painted Ship. He sent the manuscript to several publishers, but it did not find acceptance, as it was felt that there was no market for books about canals. It was not until after a magazine article he wrote came to the attention of the countryside writer H. J. Massingham that Rolt's book was published, in December 1944, under the title Narrow Boat.

=== Inland Waterways Association ===
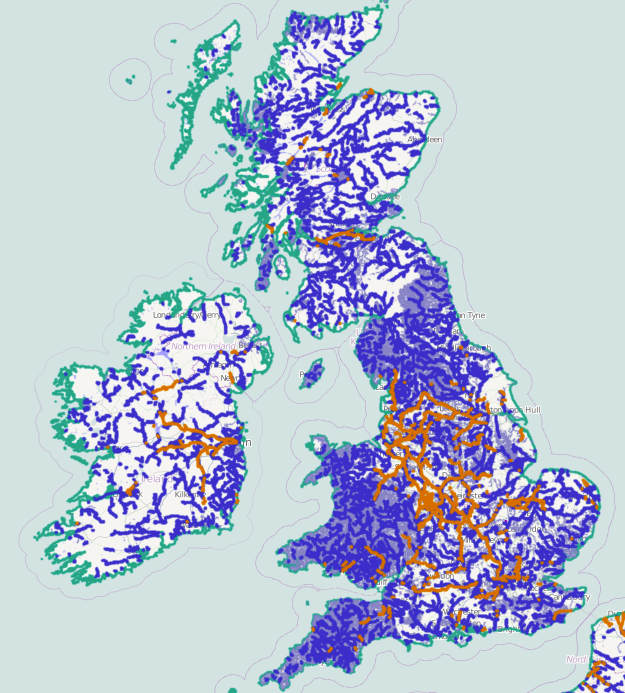
Map showing canals of Great Britain and Ireland. Canals in orange, rivers in blue, streams in grey.

Narrow Boat had an immediate success with critics and public, leading to fan mail arriving at the Rolts' boat, which was then moored at Tardebigge in Worcestershire. Two of the letters were from Robert Aickman and Charles Hadfield, who were both to figure prominently in the next phase of Rolt's life, when he became a campaigner. He invited Aickman and his wife Ray to join the Rolts on Cressy. Aickman later described the journey with the Rolts as "the best time I have ever spent on the waterways". It was on this journey that they decided to form an organisation that a few weeks later, in May 1946, at Aickman's flat in London, was named the Inland Waterways Association, with Aickman as chairman, Hadfield as vice-chairman and Rolt as secretary.

The inland waterways of Britain were nationalised in 1947 and faced an uncertain future. The traditional life that Rolt had described seemed to be threatened with extinction. Rolt pioneered direct action on the Stratford-upon-Avon Canal, which stopped British Waterways from closing it; organised a hugely successful Inland Waterways Exhibition, which started in London but toured the country; and proposed the first boat rally at Market Harborough in Leicestershire. Aickman, who had a private income, was working full time on the campaign, while Rolt, who had only his writing to support him and was still living aboard Cressy, struggled to meet all his commitments. Eventually he fell out with Aickman over the latter's insistence that every mile of canal should be saved. In early 1951 Rolt was expelled from the organisation he had inspired.

By this time he had decided to bring his life on Cressy to an end and return to his family home in Stanley Pontlarge. Angela departed to continue the mobile life, joining Billy Smart's Circus.

=== Talyllyn Railway ===
A letter Rolt had sent to the Birmingham Post in 1950 resulted in the formation of the Talyllyn Railway Preservation Society, and he now threw himself into its activities, becoming chairman of the company that operated the railway as a tourist attraction. "By the time the fateful letter terminating his IWA membership arrived, he was already busy issuing and stamping passengers' tickets from the little station in Towyn". His time at Talyllyn gave rise to his book Railway Adventure (1953), which became the basis for the Ealing comedy film The Titfield Thunderbolt.

Rolt married again, to Sonia Smith (née South), a former actress. During the war she had become one of the amateur boatwomen who worked the canals and had married a boatman. She had been on the council of the IWA. They had two sons, Tim and Dick, and continued to live in Stanley Pontlarge until Rolt's death in 1974. His grave lies in the village churchyard.

=== Author ===
Rolt became a full-time writer in 1939. The 1950s were Rolt's most prolific time as an author. His best-known works were biographies of Isambard Kingdom Brunel, which stimulated a revival of interest in a forgotten hero, George and Robert Stephenson, and Thomas Telford. His classic study of historic railway accidents, Red for Danger, became a textbook for numerous engineering courses. Rolt produced many works about subjects that had not previously been considered the stuff of literature, such as civil engineering, canals, and railways. In his later years he produced three volumes of autobiography, only one of which was published during his lifetime.

Rolt also published Sleep No More (1948) a collection of supernatural horror stories featuring ghosts, possession and atavism. These were modelled after the work of M. R. James, but used industrial settings such as railways instead of James' "antiquarian" settings. The Penguin Encyclopedia of Horror and the Supernatural described Sleep No More as "An exceptionally original collection of ghost stories ... Rolt had the special talent of combining folkloric spontaneity with artful sophistication." Several of Rolt's stories were anthologised; they were also adapted as radio dramas. His "Winterstoke" (1954) is a unique perspective on the development of modern Britain from the feudal system via the dissolution of the monasteries.

== Achievements and honours ==
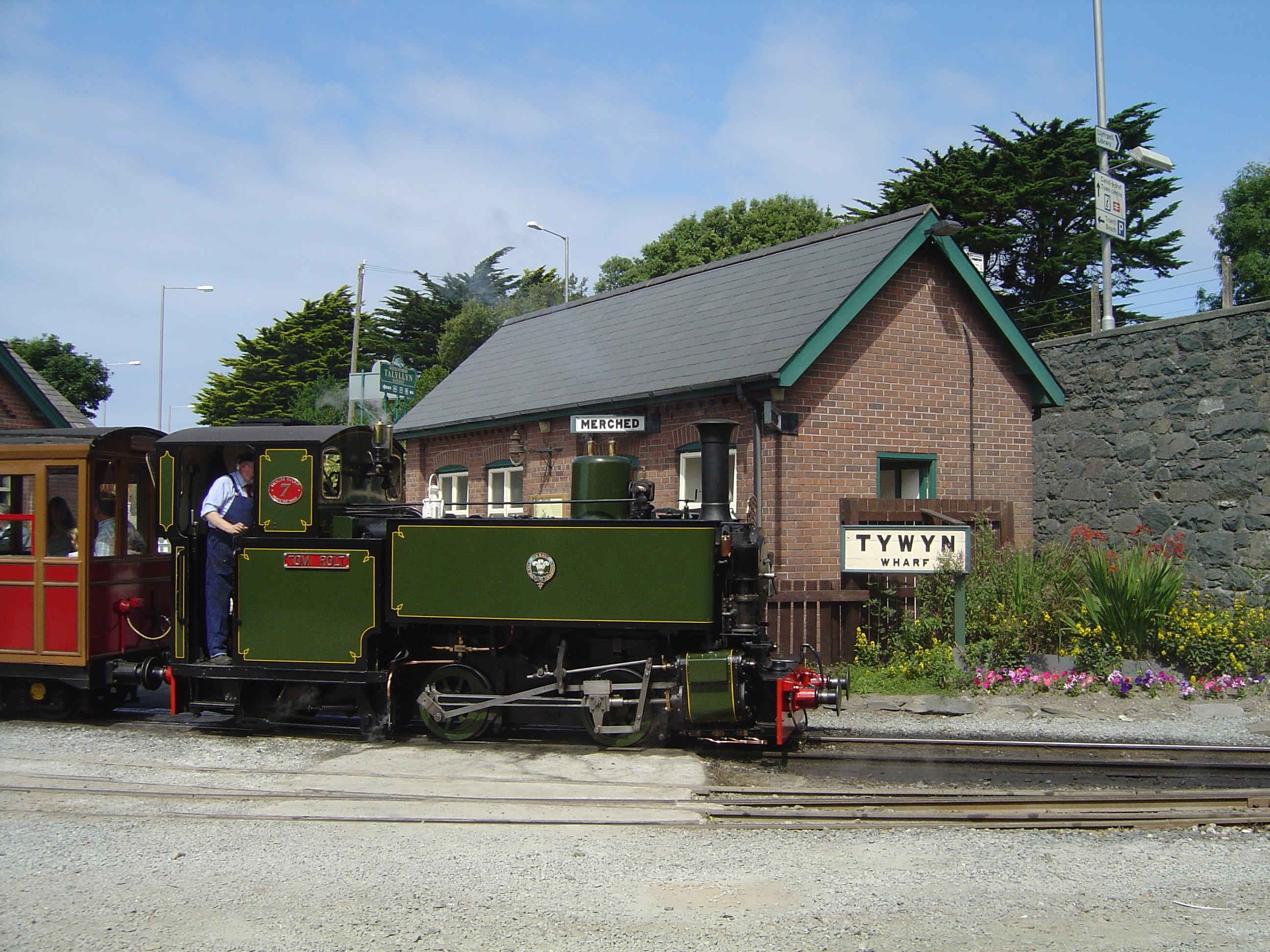
The Tom Rolt locomotive

Rolt was vice-president of the Newcomen Society, which established a Rolt Prize; a trustee and member of the Advisory Council of the Science Museum; a member of the York Railway Museum Committee; an honorary MA of Newcastle; an honorary MSc of the University of Bath (1973) and a Fellow of the Royal Society of Literature. He was a joint founder of the Association for Industrial Archaeology, which has an annual Rolt lecture. He helped to form the Ironbridge Gorge Museum Trust.

A locomotive Tom Rolt on the Talyllyn Railway, the world's first preserved railway, was named in his memory in 1991.

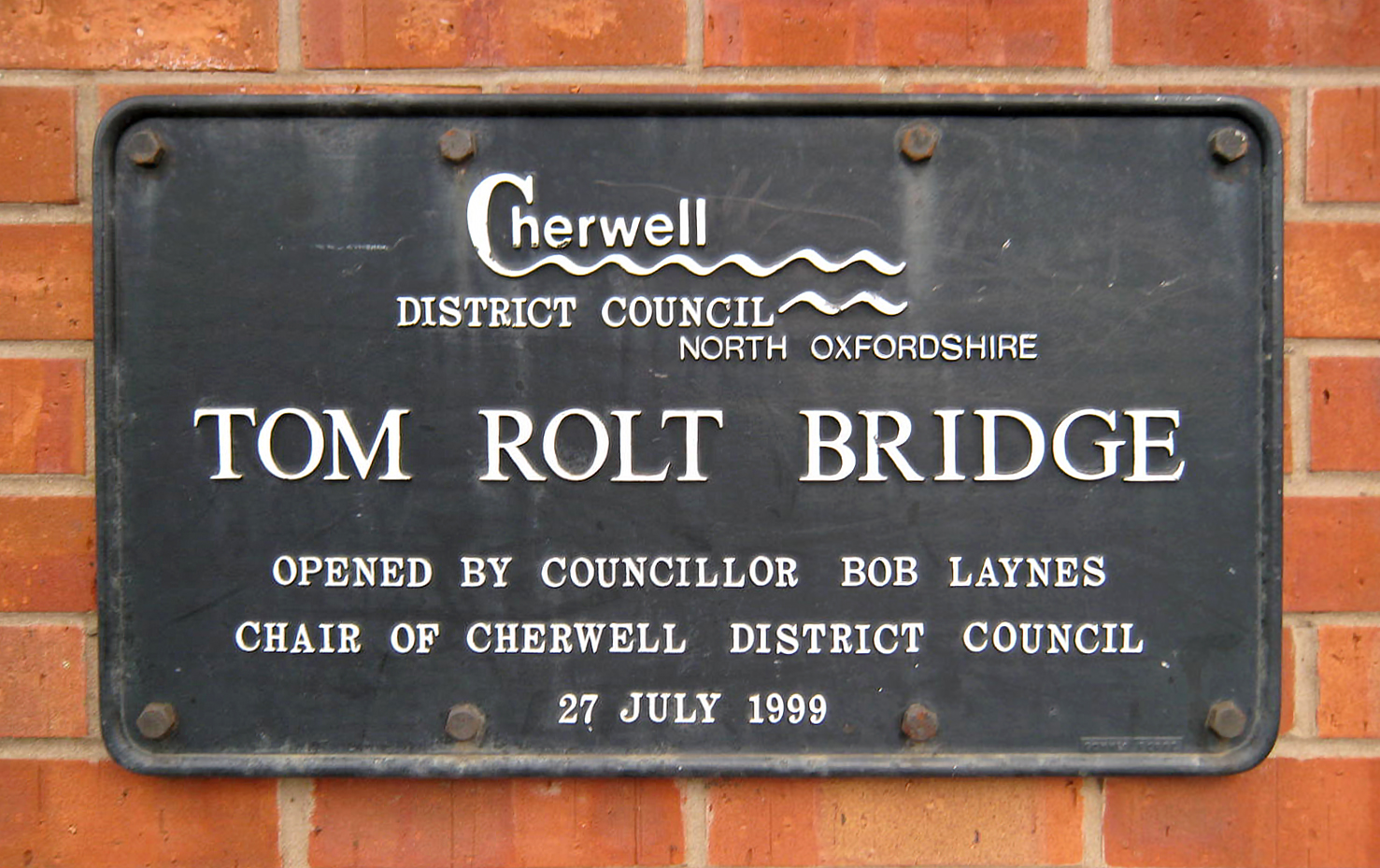
Plaque at Bridge 164 on the Oxford Canal, Banbury

Rolt observed the changes in society resulting from the industrial-scientific revolution. In the epilogue to his biography of Brunel he wrote, two years before C. P. Snow made similar statements about the split between the arts and sciences:

Men spoke in one breath of the arts and sciences, and to the man of intelligence and culture it seemed essential that he should keep himself abreast of developments in both spheres. ... So long as the artist or the man of culture had been able to advance shoulder to shoulder with engineer and scientist, and with them see the picture whole, he could share their sense of mastery and confidence, and believe wholeheartedly in material progress. But so soon as science and the arts became divorced, so soon as they ceased to speak a common language, confidence vanished, and doubts and fears came crowding in.

He set out these ideas more fully in his book High Horse Riderless, now seen by some as a classic of green philosophy.

A bridge (no. 164) on the Oxford Canal in Banbury bears his name (in commemoration of his book Narrow Boat), as does a centre at the boat museum at Ellesmere Port in Cheshire. A blue plaque to Rolt was unveiled in at Tooley's Boatyard, Banbury on 7 August 2010 as part of the centenary celebrations of his birth.

== Bibliography ==
Rolt's work (arranged by topic in rough chronological order) includes:

=== Waterways ===
- Narrow Boat (1944, Eyre & Spottiswoode)
- Green and Silver (1949, George Allen & Unwin)
- The Inland Waterways of England (1950, George Allen & Unwin)
- The Thames from Mouth to Source (1951)
- Navigable Waterways (1969, Longmans; rpt. 1973 by Hutchinson ISBN 0-09-907800-7)
- From Sea to Sea: The Canal du Midi (1973, Allen Lane)

=== Railways ===
- Lines of Character (1952, Constable), with Patrick Whitehouse
- Railway Adventure (1953, Constable)
- Red for Danger: A History of Railway Accidents and Railway Safety (1955, The Bodley Head)
- Patrick Stirling's Locomotives (1964, H. Hamilton)
- The Making of a Railway (1971, Evelyn)

=== Biography ===
- Isambard Kingdom Brunel: A Biography (1957, Longmans)
- Thomas Telford (1958, Longmans)
- The Cornish Giant: The Story of Richard Trevithick, Father of the Steam Locomotive (1960, Lutterworth Press)
- George and Robert Stephenson: The Railway Revolution (1960, Longmans)
- Great Engineers (1962, G. Bell)
- James Watt (1962, Batsford) "Makers of Britain" series
- Thomas Newcomen: The Prehistory of the Steam Engine (1968, David & Charles)

=== Industrial history ===
From the period of 1958 onwards, Rolt was commissioned by many engineering companies to document their history. Many of these are unpublished internal documents; only the published works are listed here.

- Holloways of Millbank: The First Seventy-Five Years (1958)
- The Dowty Story (Part I, 1962; Part II, 1973)
- A Hunslet Hundred: One Hundred Years of Locomotive Building by the Hunslet Engine Company (1964)
- Rolt, L. T. C. (1965), A Short History of Machine Tools, Cambridge, Massachusetts, USA: MIT Press, OCLC 250074. Co-edition published as Rolt, L. T. C. (1965), Tools for the Job: a Short History of Machine Tools, London: B. T. Batsford, LCCN 65080822.
- The Mechanicals: Progress of a Profession (1967)
- Waterloo Ironworks: A History of Taskers of Andover, 1809–1968 (1969)
- Victorian Engineering (1970)
- The Potters' Field: A History of the South Devon Ball Clay Industry (1974)

=== Autobiography ===
- Landscape with Machines (1971, Longman), first part of autobiography ISBN 0-582-10740-7
- Landscape with Canals (1977), second part of autobiography
- Landscape with Figures (1992), retitled third part of his autobiography
- The Landscape Trilogy (2001), gathers all three parts of autobiography in one volume

=== Other ===
- High Horse Riderless (1947, George Allen & Unwin), personal philosophy
- Sleep No More (1948), ghost stories
- Worcestershire (1949, Robert Hale), County Books series
- Horseless Carriage: The Motor Car in England (1950)
- Winterstoke (1954), history of a fictional Midlands town
- The Clouded Mirror (1955), travel essays
- The Aeronauts: A History of Ballooning, 1783–1903 (1966; rpt. 2006 as The Balloonists: The History of the First Aeronauts)
- Two Ghost Stories (1994)

== Gallery ==
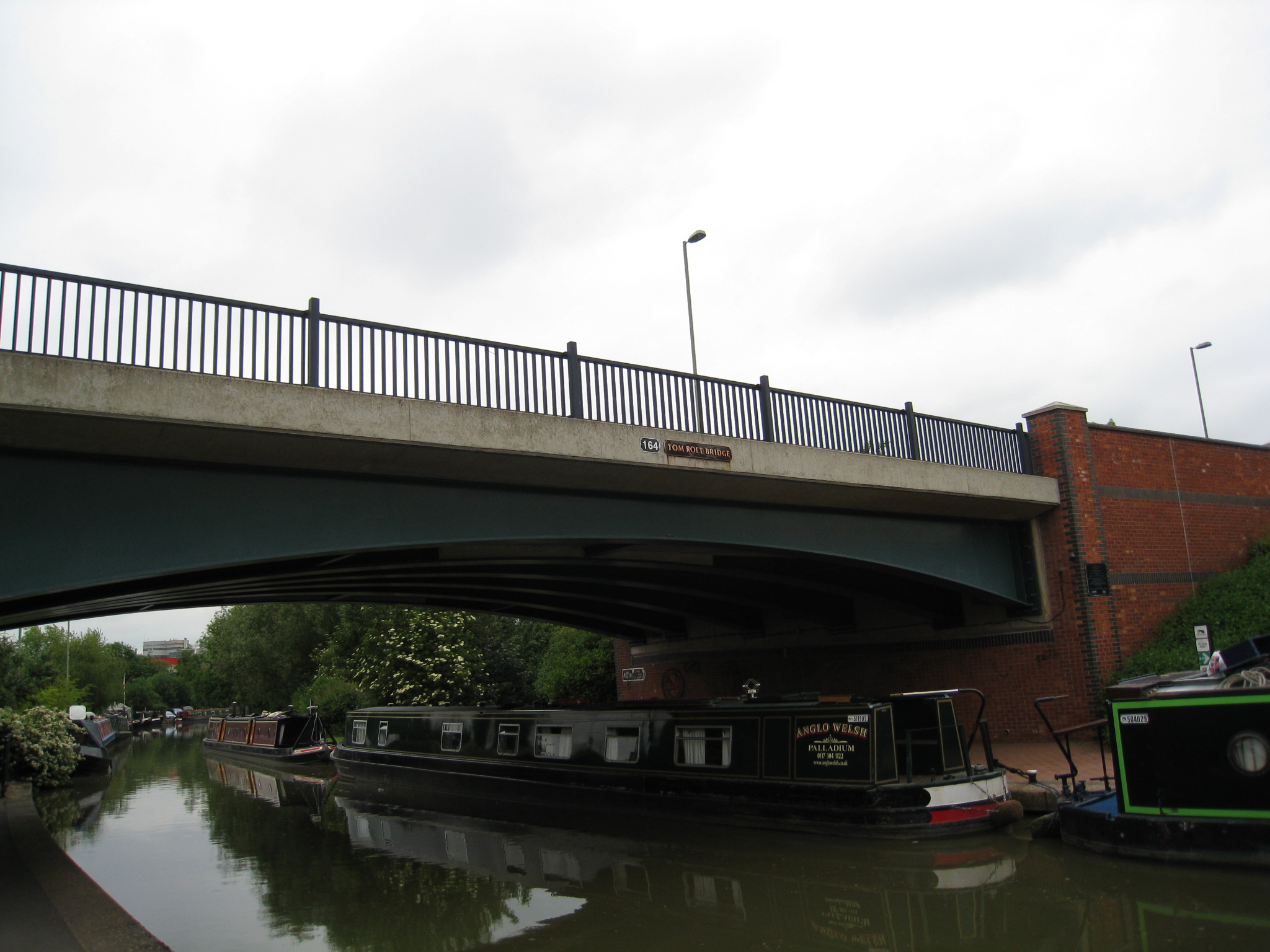
Oxford Canal, Banbury. Bridge 164 carrying Compton Road over canal

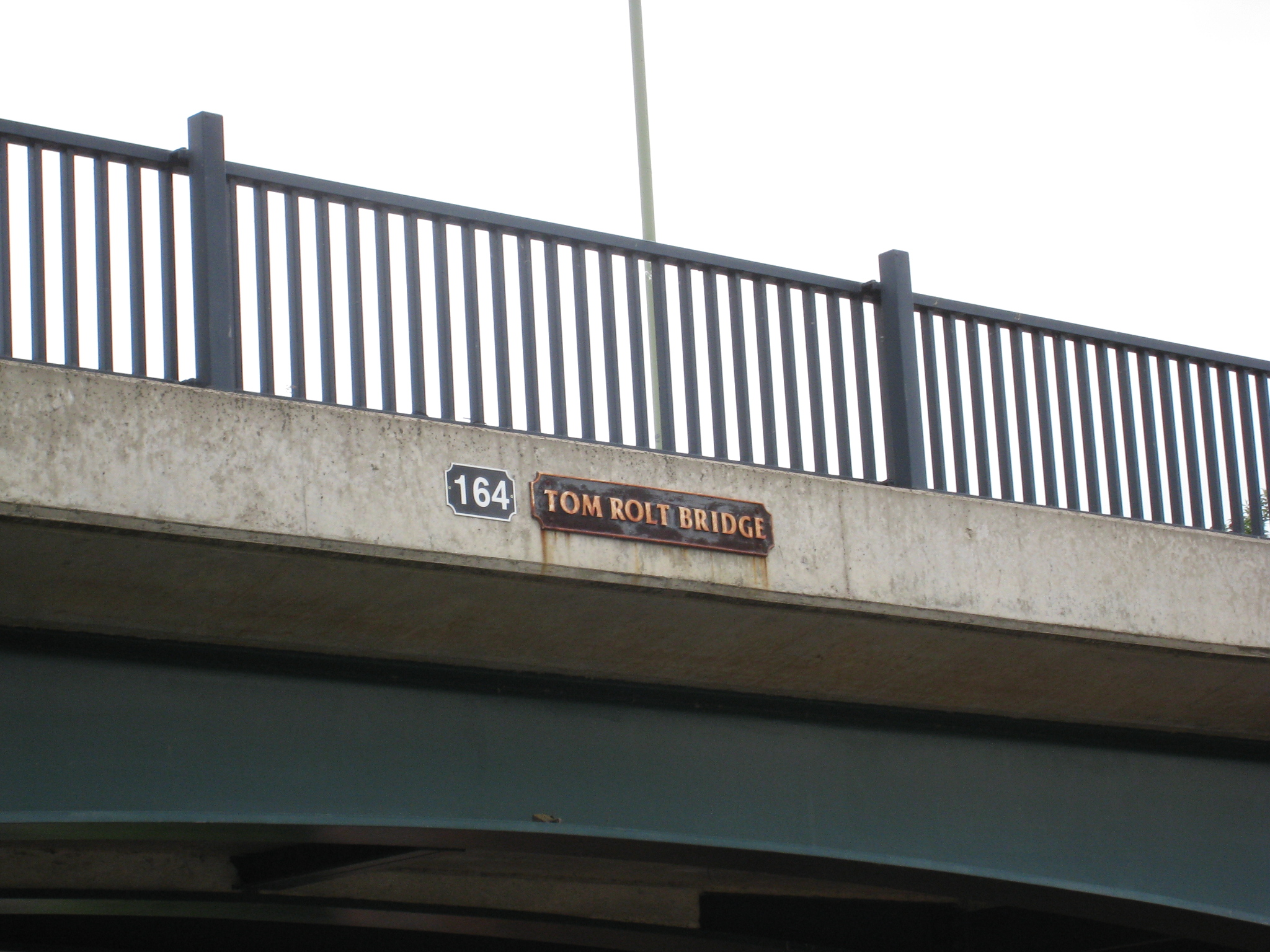
Closeup of bridge parapet showing name Tom Rolt Bridge

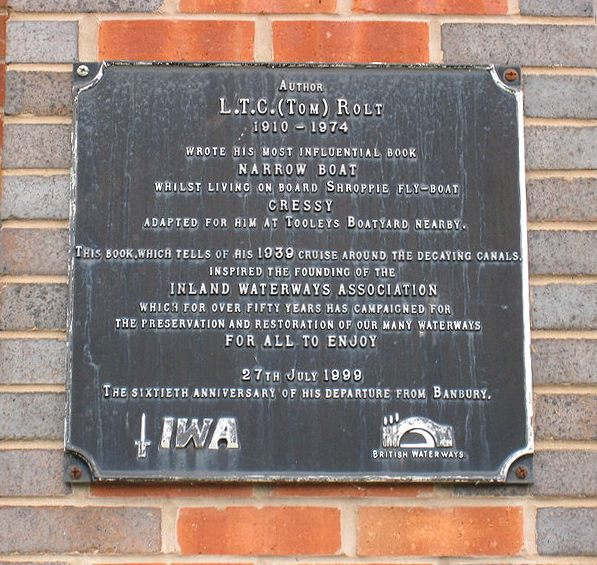
Plaque attached to retaining wall of Tom Rolt Bridge on mooring side of canal

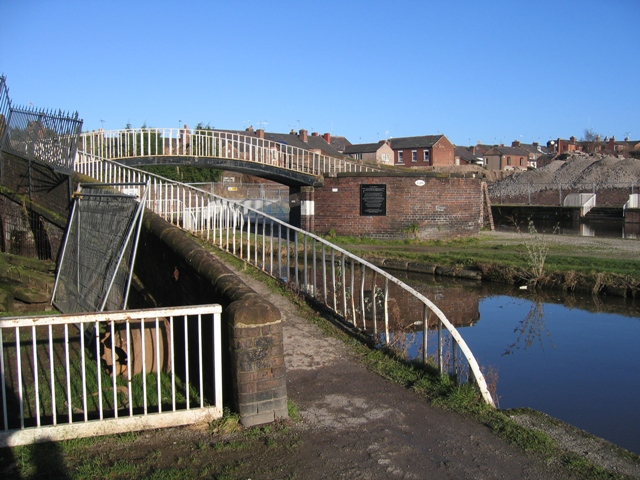
Bridge over the Shropshire Union Canal at Chester

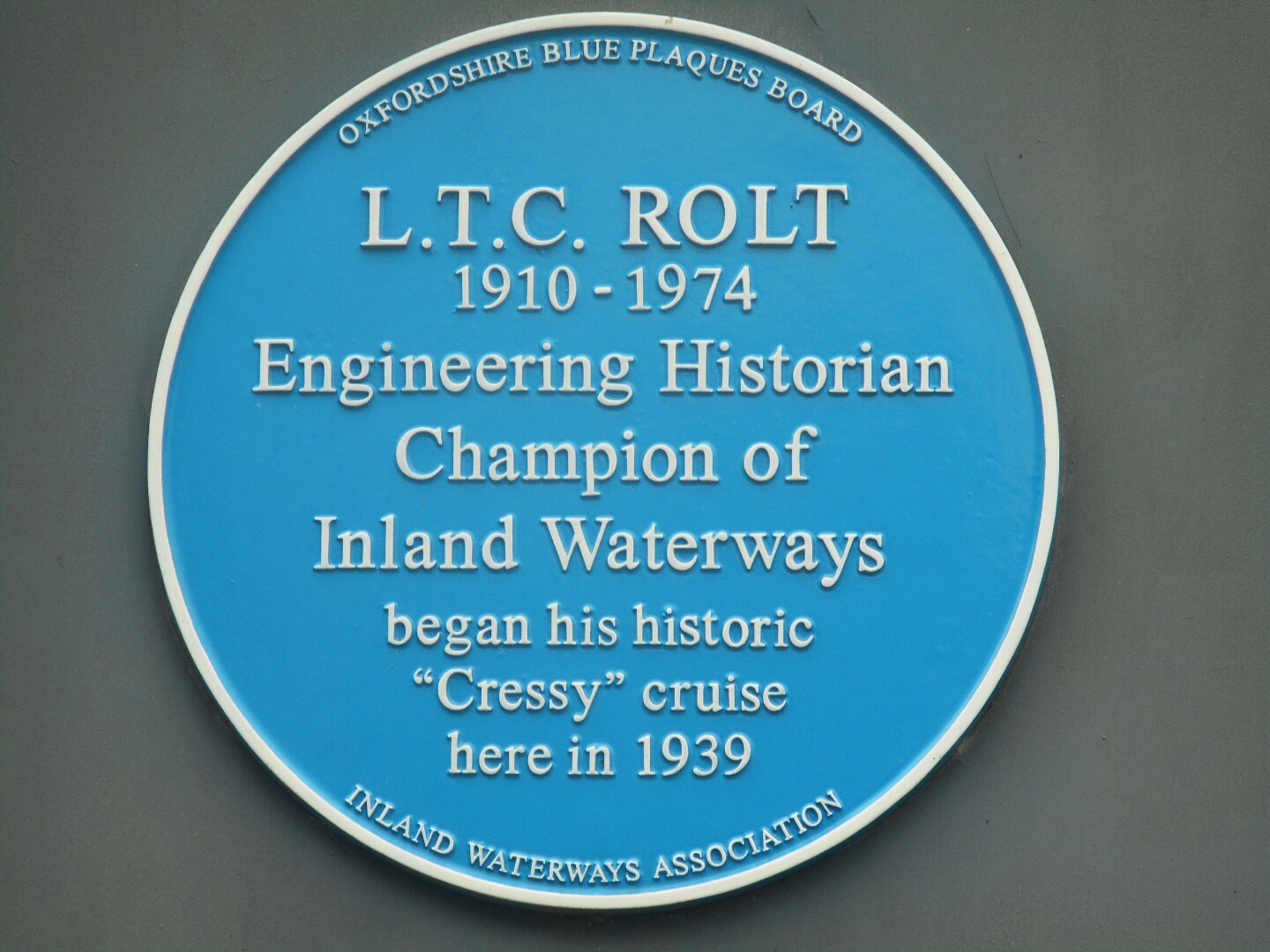
Blue Plaque at Tooley's Boatyard

== See also ==
- Canals of the United Kingdom
- History of the British canal system
