= Green and Silver =

1949 book by L. T. C. Rolt

- First edition
- Author: L.T.C. Rolt
- Cover artist: Evelyn Hunt
- Publication date: 1949

Green and Silver is the account by Tom Rolt of a voyage through the inland waterways of Ireland just after the Second World War, published in 1949. It is notable because it was one of the last trips by any boat around the triangular loop of the River Shannon, Grand Canal, and Royal Canal before the last named was closed to navigation (until 2010).

== Background ==
L. T. C. Rolt's book Narrowboat (1944) had set in motion a revival of interest in the canals of Britain. In 1946, after reading an account by Samuel Smiles of the origins of the Royal Canal in Ireland, he and his wife Angela decided to explore its waterways. As using his narrow boat in Ireland was impossible (it was too long for the locks on the Grand Canal), he sat about finding a smaller boat, ending up with a 28 ft (8.5 m) cruiser rented in Athlone. The schedule was tight as the locks to the River Liffey in Dublin from both Royal and Grand Canals were due to close for maintenance, and the supply of petrol for pleasure boating was uncertain.

They overcame the obstacles and managed to complete their journey, which included the length of the Shannon from Lough Allen in the north to Killaloe and Limerick in the south (although they didn't take the boat to the limits). As with all of Tom Rolt's books, there is a deep feeling for the history and techniques of his subject matter and a certain amount of philosophizing, which was expressed most fully in his High Horse Riderless, published the following year.

The itinerary at the back includes a full list of locks and bridges, with distances, on the waterways covered.

== Contents ==
1. The Journey is planned
2. Introduction to Ireland: Athlone and Lough Ree
3. Galway and Connemara
4. The voyage begins: Athlone to Shannon Harbour
5. Clonfert and Banagher
6. The Grand Canal: Shannon Harbour to Tullamore
7. The Grand Canal: Tullamore to Dublin
8. Dublin
9. The Royal Canal: Spencer Dock to Mullingar
10. The Royal Canal: Mullingar to the Shannon
11. The Upper Shannon and the River Boyle
12. Battlebridge, Lough Allen and a Regatta
13. An Interlude Ashore: Drumshambo and Sligo
14. Down River: Jamestown to Portumna
15. Lough Derg: Portumna to Killaloe
16. Killaloe and Limerick
17. Back to Athlone
18. Farewell to Ireland Itinerary

== Legacy ==
The round trip of the Shannon and two canals has since been dubbed the "Green and Silver Route".

== Bibliography ==
- Rolt, L.T.C. (1949), Green and Silver, George Allen and Unwin, London
