= Tom Rolt (locomotive) =

Preserved steam locomotive

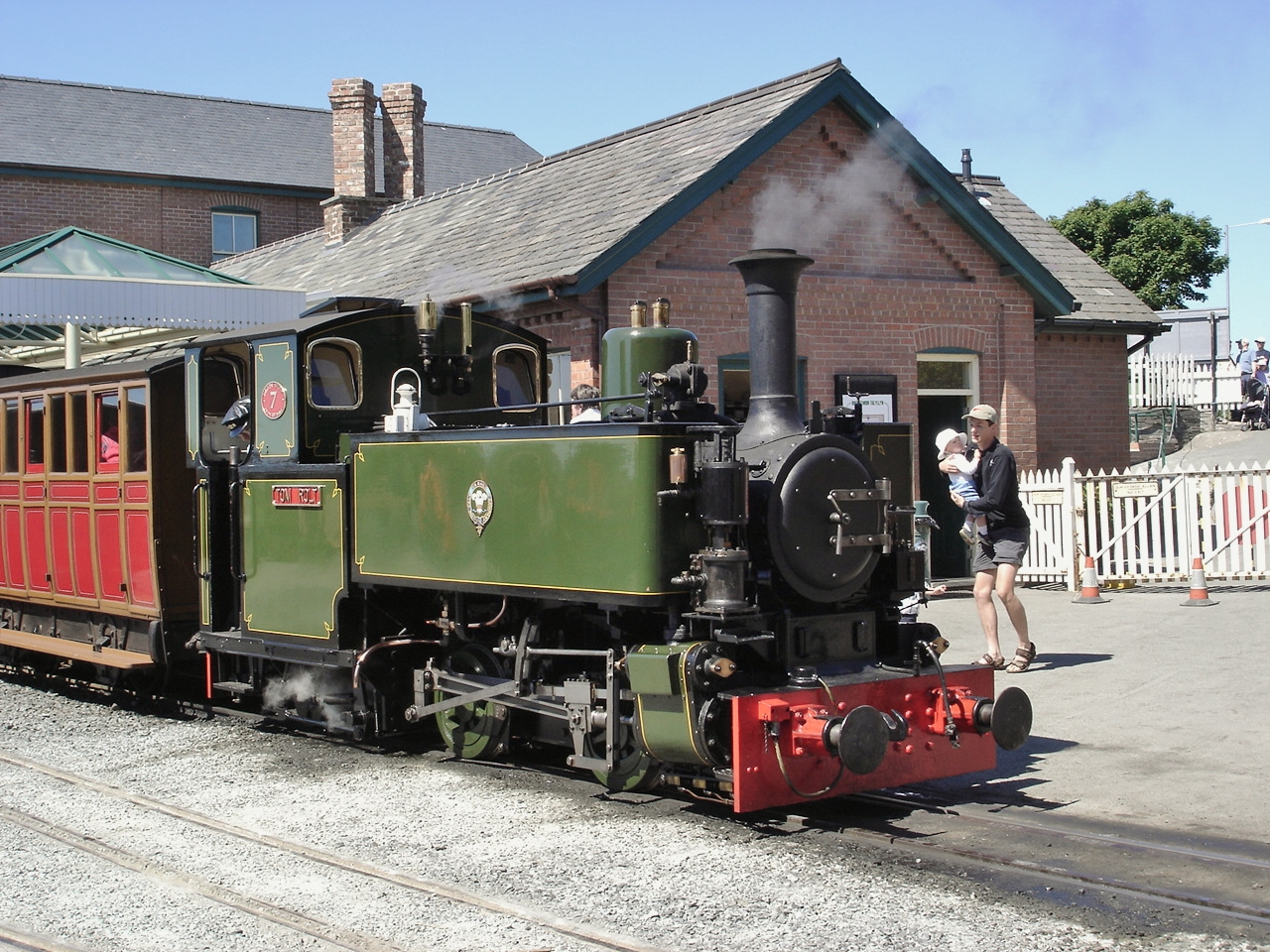
Type and origin
- Power type: Steam
- Builder: Andrew Barclay Sons & Co. (original locomotive); Pendre Works, Talyllyn Railway (rebuild)
- Build date: 1949 (original); 1991 (rebuild)
Specifications
- Configuration
  - Whyte: 0-4-2T
- Gauge: 2 ft 3 in (686 mm)
- Driver dia.: 2 ft 0 in (610 mm)
- Trailing dia.: 1 ft 4 in (406 mm)
- Wheelbase: 9 ft 10 in (3.00 m)
- Length: 18 ft 8.5 in (5.70 m)
- Loco weight: 14 long tons 5 cwt (14.5 t; 16.0 short tons)
- Boiler pressure: 180 lbf/in^{2} (1.24 MPa)
- Cylinders: Two, outside
- Cylinder size: 8 1/2 in × 12 in (216 mm × 305 mm)
Performance figures
- Tractive effort: 5,527 lbf (24.59 kN)
Career
- Operators: Talyllyn Railway
- Numbers: 7

Tom Rolt is a narrow gauge steam locomotive constructed by the Talyllyn Railway, using parts from an Andrew Barclay locomotive built in 1949 for Bord na Móna.

== History ==
=== Bord na Móna ===
Bord na Móna is the peat harvesting company in Ireland, which used a large network of narrow gauge railways to carry peat from the bogs.

In 1949, the company ordered three 3 ft (914 mm) gauge 0-4-0WT locomotives from Andrew Barclay Sons & Co. These were initially numbered 1 to 3, but were renumbered 43 to 45 in 1954. The locomotives were designed to burn peat, but they did not perform well and were put into storage after only a few years of work.

=== Talyllyn Railway ===
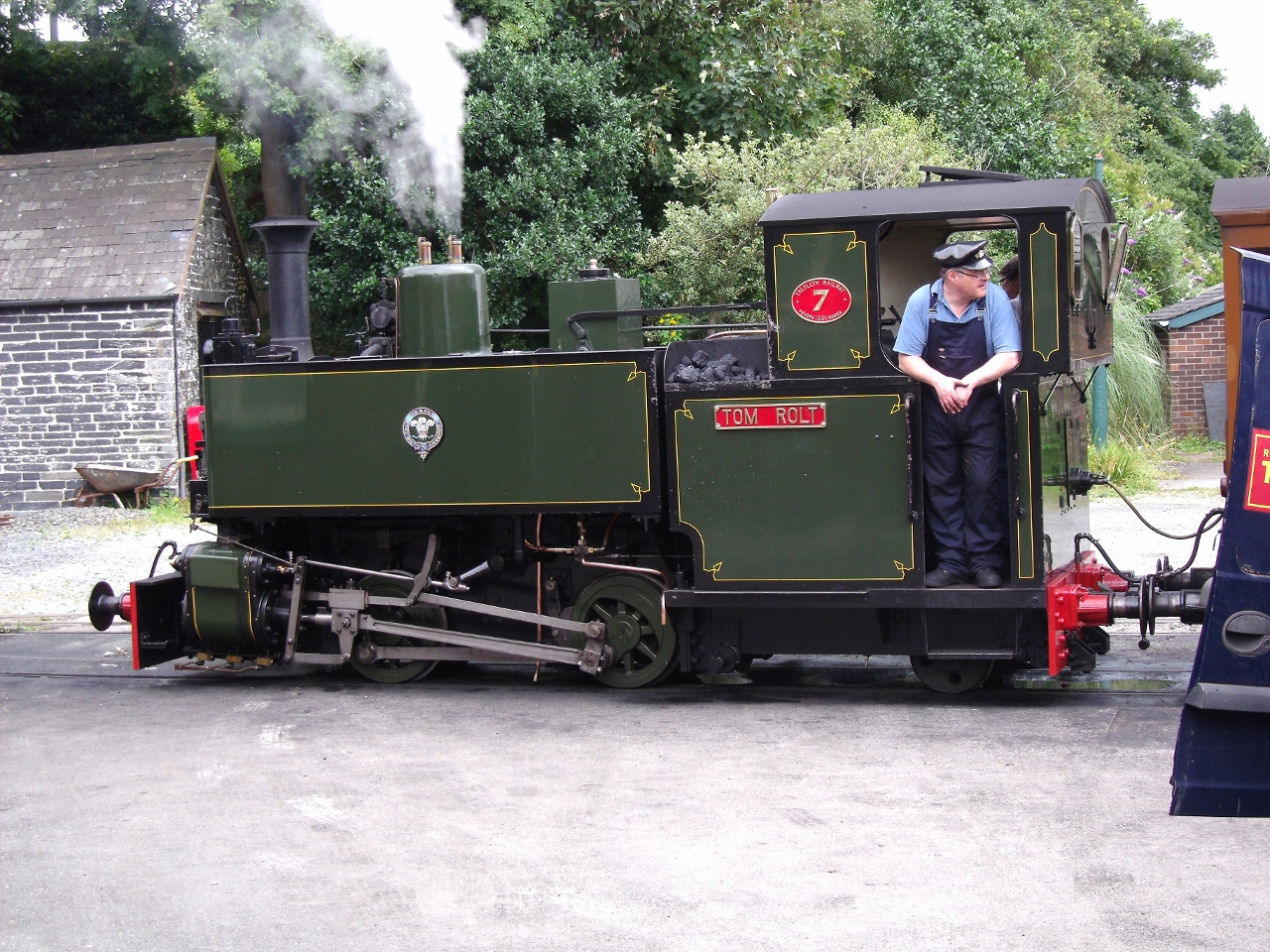
No. 7 Tom Rolt

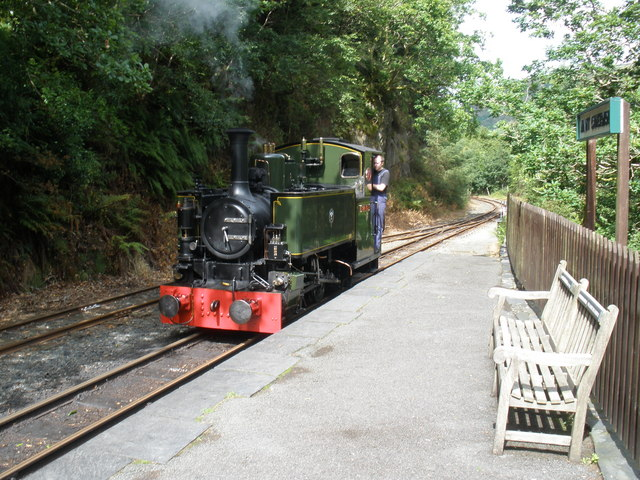
Tom Rolt at Nant Gwernol

The 2 ft 3 in (686 mm) gauge Talyllyn Railway in Wales experienced a significant growth in passenger numbers in the late 1960s, and sought additional motive power to handle the extra traffic. The railway's unusual gauge meant there were no second-hand steam locomotives available to purchase. In 1969 the railway purchased one of the Bord na Móna's Barclay locomotives with the intention of regauging it. The locomotive was unofficially named Irish Pete.

The project to convert Irish Pete did not happen and the locomotive remained in storage at Tywyn. In the late 1980s, work started to build a new locomotive using the boiler, driving wheels, cylinders and other parts from Irish Pete. New frames were manufactured by the Talyllyn Railway in 1971. This work was done at the railway's own works at Pendre and was completed in 1991. Upon its rebuild, a formal vote was held by the society's members to give the newly built 0-4-2T locomotive a name. The candidates on the final voting sheet were Cadair Idris after a nearby mountain, Earl of Northesk after the preservation society's original president, Nant Gwernol after the local valley, Irish Pete, Prince William and Tom Rolt after the author L. T. C. Rolt who had inspired and led the Talyllyn's preservation. Unlike before, a system of transferrable votes was utilized and Tom Rolt won the vote; the locomotive being officially christened on 6 May 1991 after being tested three days earlier. As of 2025, Tom Rolt is running in the standard Talyllyn Railway livery of deep bronze green lined with black borders and yellow lining. To date, it has never left the Tallylyn Railway to visit other narrow gauge lines.

== In fiction ==
The character Ivo Hugh in The Railway Series books is based on Tom Rolt. Ivo Hugh appears in New Little Engine.

== Bibliography ==
- Bate, J.H.L. (2001). The Chronicles of Pendre Sidings. RailRomances. ISBN 1-900622-05-X.
- Boyd, James I.C. (1965). Narrow Gauge Railways in Mid Wales. Oakwood Press. ISBN 0-85361-024-X.
- Holmes, Alan (2009). Talyllyn Revived. The Talyllyn Railway. ISBN 978-0-900317-07-1.
- Potter, D. (1990). The Talyllyn Railway. David St John Thomas. ISBN 0-946537-50-X.
