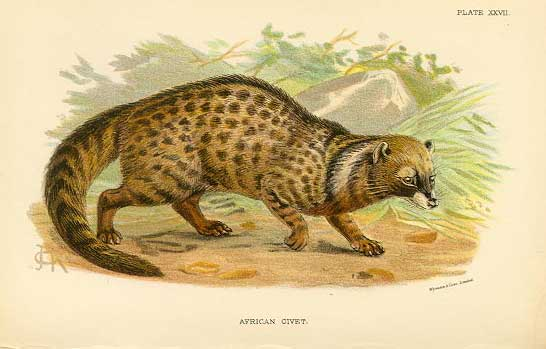
- African civet (Civettictis civetta)

Scientific classification
- Kingdom: Animalia
- Phylum: Chordata
- Class: Mammalia
- Order: Carnivora
- Family: Viverridae
- Subfamily: Viverrinae; Gray, 1864

Genera
- Civettictis; Viverra; Viverricula; †Megaviverra; †Promegaviverra; †Semigenetta; †Vishnuictis

= Viverrinae =

Viverrinae Temporal range: Miocene–Present

Subfamily of carnivores

The Viverrinae represent the largest subfamily of the Viverridae comprising three genera, which are subdivided into six species native to Africa and Southeast Asia. This subfamily was denominated and first described by John Edward Gray in 1864.

== Classification ==
Gray defined the Viverrinae as comprising the genera Proteles, Viverra, Bassaris and Viverricula. He subordinated the genera Genetta and Fossa to the Genettina, the genera Prionodon and Poiana to the Prionodontinae. Reginald Innes Pocock suggested that the African genets (Genetta) are also most nearly related to the Viverrinae, but should perhaps form a separate subfamily. William King Gregory and Milo Hellman placed the Viverra, Viverricula, Civettictis, Genetta, Osbornictis, Poiana and the North-American eucreodine genera Didymictis and Viverravus of the Eocene into this viverrid subfamily. Ellerman and Morrison-Scott also included the genus Prionodon.

DNA analysis based on 29 Carnivora species comprising 13 Viverrinae species and three species representing Paradoxurus, Paguma and Hemigalinae supports the placement of Prionodon in the monogeneric family Prionodontidae as the sister-group of the Felidae. These investigations also clarified the controversial issue of the boundaries of this subfamily supporting the Viverrinae as being constituted by two monophyletic groups, namely the terrestrial civets Civettictis–Viverra–Viverricula and Poiana–Genetta.

At present, the Viverrinae comprise:

Genus	Species	IUCN Red List status and distribution
Viverra Linnaeus, 1758	Large Indian civet (V. zibetha) Linnaeus, 1758	LC
Viverra Linnaeus, 1758	Malayan civet (V. tangalunga) Gray, 1832	LC
Viverra Linnaeus, 1758	Malabar large-spotted civet (V. civettina) Blyth, 1862	CR
Viverra Linnaeus, 1758	Large-spotted civet (V. megaspila) Blyth, 1862	EN
Viverricula Hodgson, 1838	Small Indian civet (V. indica) Étienne Geoffroy Saint-Hilaire, 1803	LC
Civettictis Pocock, 1915	African civet (C. civetta) (Schreber, 1776)	LC

== Characteristics ==
Viverrina species have a robust body. There is a deep pouch for secreting in the form of a deep cavity on each side of the anus. The back of the hind feet is hairy except the pad of the toes and the metatarsus. The digitigrade feet are adapted for movement on the ground. The cushion-like indistinctly subdivided plantar pad and the pads of digits 2 to 4 are alone applied to the ground. The first digit is small and set well above the plantar pad, and constitutes a practically functionless "dew-claw". The dental formula is: 3.1.4.23.1.4.2.

The outstanding characteristics of the modern Viverrinae are the high development of the perineal scent glands, the marked anteroposterior elongation of the entotympanic chamber of the compound bulla and the carnassial form of the cheek-teeth.

They have excellent hearing and vision. Their flesh-shearing carnassial teeth are relatively undeveloped.

Viverrids are amongst the primitive families of the Carnivora, with skeletons very similar to those of fossils dating back to the Eocene, up to 50 million years ago. They are variable in form, but generally resemble long-nosed cats. Most have retractile or partially retractile claws, and a baculum.

The Viverrinae range in size from the African linsang with a body length of 33 cm (13 in) and a weight of 650 g (1.43 lb) to the African civet at 84 cm (33 in) and 18 kg (40 lb).

== Distribution and ecology ==
This subfamily is found throughout the Oriental region, and is represented in Africa by the African civet (Civettictis civetta). The common genet (Genetta genetta) is considered to have been introduced to Europe and the Balearic Islands, and occurs in all of continental Portugal, Spain and most of France.

They are generally solitary and omnivorous, despite their placement in the order Carnivora.
