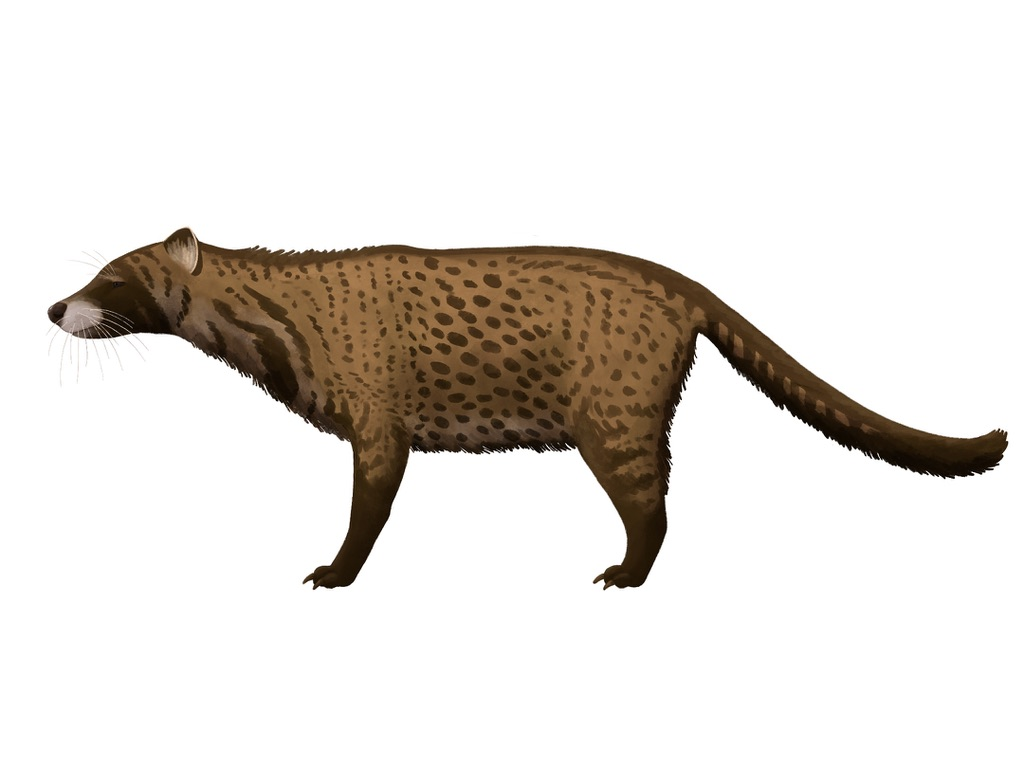
- Life restoration

Scientific classification
- Kingdom: Animalia
- Phylum: Chordata
- Class: Mammalia
- Order: Carnivora
- Family: Viverridae
- Subfamily: Viverrinae
- Genus: †Vishnuictis; Pilgrim, 1932

Type species
- †Viverra durandi Lydekker, 1884

Species
- †V. africana Morals & Pickford, 2008; †V. chinjiensis (Pilgrim, 1932); †V. durandi (Lydekker 1884); †V. hariensis? Prasad, 1968; †V. hasnoti (Pilgrim, 1913); †V. plectilodous Sankhyan et al., 2025; †V. salmontanus Pilgrim, 1932; †V.? yuanmouensis Zong, 1997

Synonyms
- Vishnuictis durandi; Viverra peii Zhanxiang, 1980; Vishnuictis salmontanus; Vishnuictis hariensis Prasad, 1968; Viverra nagrii Prasad, 1968

= Vishnuictis =

Vishnuictis Temporal range: Middle Miocene to Middle Pleistocene, 14.5–0.73 Ma

Extinct genus of carnivorans

Vishnuictis is an extinct genus of viverrid known from the Middle Miocene to Pleistocene of India, Pakistan, China, Myanmar, and Kenya. The genus is polytypic, with around 7-8 species being referred to this genus, with the type species being the Vishnuictis durandi.

== History and Naming ==
The holotype of V. durandi was discovered by W. E. Baker and H. M. Durand in the year 1836 from the Sub-Himalayan region. In 1868, Hugh Falconer have studied the specimen described the remains as a possible new unnamed species of Canis. In 1884, Richard Lydekker also studied the specimen and found out that its morphology similar to viverrine's and described it as Viverra durandi, where the species name is in honour of H. M. Durand, who discovered the fossils. Later in 1932, Guy Ellcock Pilgrim also studied the specimen thoroughly, noting that it is quite distinguishable from the genus Viverra, enough to be placed in its own genus and recombined it as a species of the newly formed genus Vishnuictis, Vishnucitis durandi. Lydekker has described two partial skulls belonging to V. durandi, Pilgrim described that both of those skull remains are from Siwalik Hills, but of uncertain horizon, most likely from Plio-Pleistocene of Pinjor beds of Upper Sivaliks.

The genus is named after Vishnu, one of the primary Hindu deities, with the Greek word ἴκτις (ίktis) "marten".

== Species ==
=== Vishnuictis durandi ===
It is the type species of the genus, known from Sivalik Hills of uncertain horizon. Originally, there were only two skulls that were referred to this taxon, the holotype skull(BMNH M1338) which was figured by Lydekker, 1884(in palatal view) and Pilgrim, 1932(in dorsal and lateral views), and the referred specimen(BMNH M37150) which was left unfigured. The overall size of V. durandi was not estimated but it is said to be a viverrid of very large size. The species was originally referred as the species of Viverra in 1884, before being later recombined to Vishnuictis.

In 1996, Robert M. Hunt reviewed the specimens of V. durandi, where he figured the holotype skull(BMNH M1338) and the referred skull(BMNH M37150), a partial rostrum, he also identified another skull (on the basis of how the specimen is preserved, which is similar to the holotype cranium and referred rostrum), BMNH M37131(another cranial specimen), though unlike the holotype, which has teeth, this specimen lacks any and the auditory bulla only survives in the holotype, he estimate the basilar length of all three cranium being around 18 to 20 cm in length, making it comparable to Viverra leakeyi, he also noted that the frontal regions of the crania are expanded significantly, resulting in the frontal expansions to slopes downward to the smaller braincase, the dentition of the V. durandi are very much akin to V. leakeyi, having sectorial forms in the construction of the carnassial and molars, suggesting a more hypercarnivorus diet for both taxons, V. durandi, however, has more sectorial carnassial-molar region than those of V. leakeyi. Later in the same year, he proposed Viverra peii, from Zhoukoudian Peking Man Site, China as a potential junior synonym of V. durandi, suggesting that V. durandi was also present in Pliocene of western Asia, he also described V. durandi being a wolf-like viverrid, possessing shearing carnassials & molars and having skull morphology similar to Civettictis civetta, suggesting that the genus Vishnuictis is more related to the Civettictis than to Viverra.

The overall dimensions of upper M¹ of the holotype are said to be 10.85 x 18.5 mm². Viverra peii, if considered a synonym of Vishnuictis durandi, is also a significantly large sized viverrid, having lower M¹ dimensions of 19 x 10 mm², slightly larger than that of Viverra leakeyi, which has upper M¹ dimensions of 10.1 x 14.5(Lit 59/466, type) mm² and lower M¹ dimensions of 18 x 9.5 mm²(AaO-35).

The species etymology is after H. M. Durand, who discovered the holotype specimen of the taxon in 1868 from Sivalik Hills alongside many other carnivoran specimens with his colleague W. E. Baker.

=== Vishnuictis salmontanus ===
It is currently the smallest species within the genus, the species Vishnuictis salmontanus was discovered in what is now Hasnot region of Sivalik Hills, that date back to earlier part of Late Miocene(10.1 to 7.9 mya), V. salmontanus is known from relatively complete skull remain, the overall dimensions of lower M¹ is stated to be 10.4 x 5.7 mm², which overall less compared to the dimensions lower M¹ of Viverra zibetha, with the length being 14.3 mm. The estimated weight range of V. salmontanus is 2–4 kg. In 2025, Barry has considered Vishnuictis hariensis, and Viverra nagrii, to be synonymous with Vishnuictis salmontanus.

The species etymology is currently unknown.

=== Vishnuictis chinjiensis ===
This species is known from a partial mandibular ramus described by Pilgrim, it was originally referred to the genus Viverra by Pilgrim in 1932.

In 2008, Morales and Pickford later insisted to reclassify the taxon as a species within Vishnuictis, the holotype specimen was discovered in Kukar Dhok, near Chinji Town in Salt Range, Pakistan and date back to middle-late Miocene(14.3–11.5), making it the oldest known species within the genus, additional remains are from Nagri(Pakistan, part of Nagri Formation), Ramnagar(India, part of Chinji Formation), Kalagarh(India) and Chaungtha(Myanmar, part of Irrawaddy Formation). The dimensions of lower M¹ of V. chinjiensis are stated to be 10 x 5.2 mm², despite this the weight estimate calculated by Barry, 2025 states that it weighs around 3 to 5 kg, 1 kg larger than V. salmontanus.

The species etymology is either after the Chinji Formation or the nearby located Chinji Town

=== Vishnuictis plectilodous ===
It is currently considered the largest species within the genus Vishnucitis, even exceeding the size estimates of the previous record holder V. durandi. It is specifically known from a single lower M¹ discovered in Haritalyangar, Himachal Pradesh, India and date back to early Pliocene(8-4.5 million years ago) of Upper Dhok Pathan Formation, the lower M¹ tooth dimensions are 25.7 x 13 mm², making it the largest known viverrid of all time, even bigger than those of Viverra leakeyi and Pseudocivetta.

The species etymology is the combination of the two words plectilis and οδούς (odoús), where the Latin plectilis "plaited; intricate" alludes to the complex cuspids of the known lower M¹ tooth, that varied in height and shape, and the Greek οδούς (odoús) means "tooth". The complexity of the tooth also suggests that V. plectilodous might have been more omnivorus, unlike V. durandi which is most likely a hypercarnivore on the basis of its dentition.

=== Vishnuictis hasnoti ===
This species was discovered in the Hasnot region of Salt Range, Pakistan by Pilgrim, though he described the taxon as having affiliates with Lutrinae and described it as Lutrine gen ind., hasnoti.

In 2025, Barry considered this taxon as a type of viverrid and recombining the species in the genus Vishnuictis, this classification was further supported by Anek Ram Sankhyan and his team later in the same year. The M¹ dimensions of Vishnuictis hasnoti are 14.5 x 7.5 mm², with the weight being 9 to 20 kg, making it comparable in size with Civettictis civetta, the rocks where the holotype was discovered date back to 11.4 to 9.8 million years ago and is the part of Chinji Formation.

The species name is after Hasnot region of Pakistan, where the holotype was originally discovered.

== Description ==
V. durandi and V. salmontanus are known from multiple skulls described as overall being extremely high and slender, similar to Civettictis civetta. Other species are known from multiple teeth and mandible fragments. Specimens of V. plectilodous suggest a possibly omnivorous diet and a body size larger than previously thought.

== Distribution ==
The oldest known fossil record of Vishnuictis is V. africana (named after the continent of Africa) from the Muruyur Formation of Kenya, which date to the Middle Miocene. In Asia, V. salmontanus has been reported from the Dhok Pathan Formation and the Yuanmou Formation (China). V. plectilodous (India) and V. hasnoti (Pakistan) are also known from Dhok Pathan Formation outcrops. V. hariensis is known from Late Miocene Nagri Formation (India). V.? chinjiensis is reported from the Middle Miocene Chinji Formation of both India and Pakistan and is the oldest known Asian species of the genus. The species V.? durandi and have been reported from the Pliocene to Pleistocene Pinjor Formation (India).

== Taxonomy ==
V. durandi and V. chinjiensis were originally assigned to the genusViverra. The species V. hasnoti is closely related to V. plectilodous.

== General references ==
- Morales, Jorge; Pickford, Martin (2008). "Creodonts and carnivores from the Middle Miocene Muruyur Formation, Kipsaraman and Cheparawa, Baringo District, Kenya". Comptes Rendus Palevol. 7 (8): 487. Bibcode:2008CRPal...7..487M. doi:10.1016/j.crpv.2008.09.011.
- R., Carroll (1998). "R. L. Carroll. 1988. Vertebrate Paleontology and Evolution" (PDF). Sivalik Hills Fauna. doi:10.2307/3514548. JSTOR 3514548. S2CID 86406076.
- Dong, Wei; Qi, Guoqi (2013). "Hominoid-Producing Localities and Biostratigraphy in Yunnan". Fossil Mammals of Asia-Neogene Biostratigraphy and Chronology: 293–313. doi:10.7312/columbia/9780231150125.003.0011. ISBN 978-0-231-15012-5.
