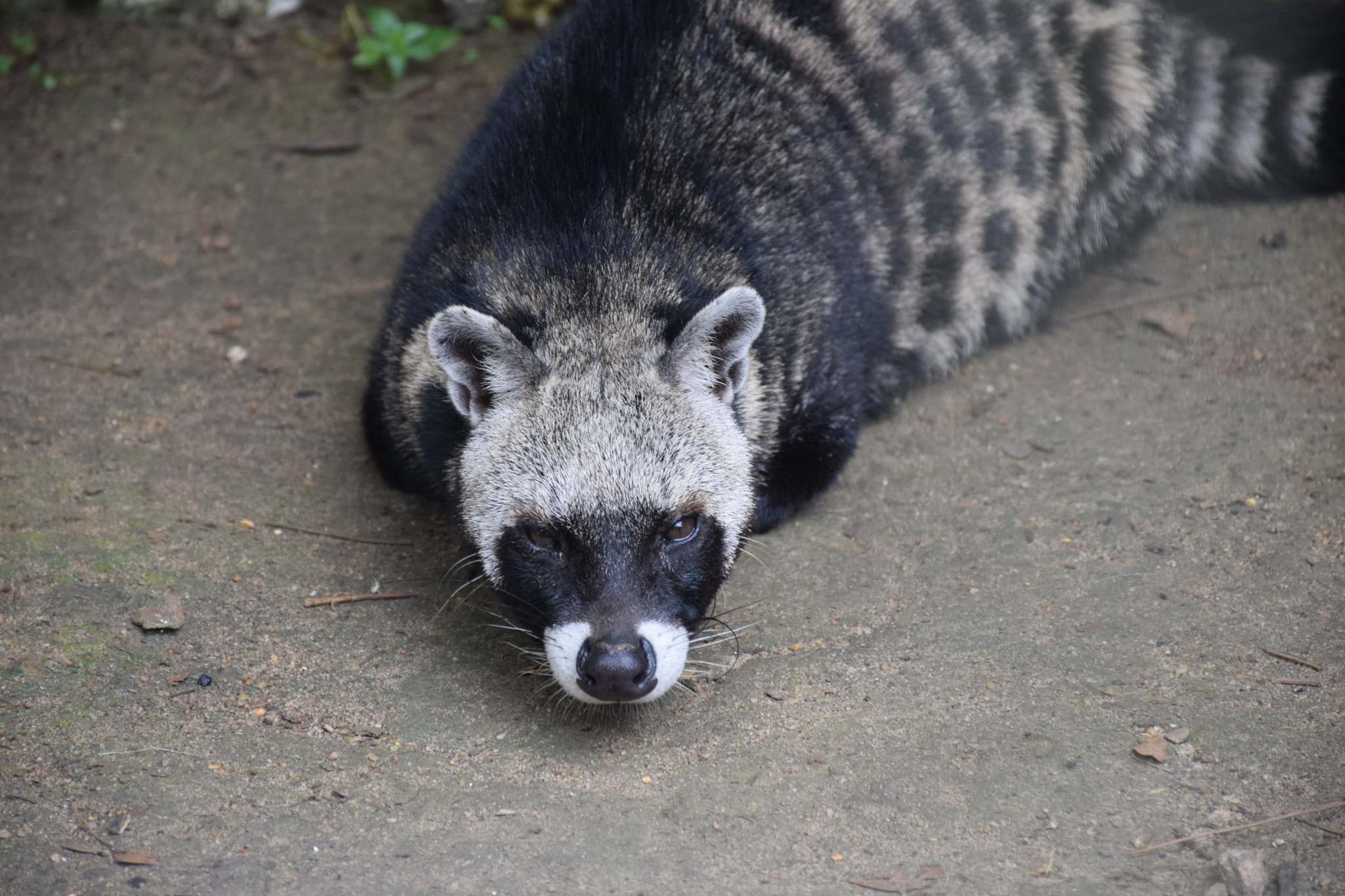
- African civet (Civettictis civetta)

Scientific classification
- Kingdom: Animalia
- Phylum: Chordata
- Class: Mammalia
- Order: Carnivora
- Family: Viverridae
- Subfamily: Viverrinae
- Genus: Civettictis; Pocock, 1915

Species
- Civettictis civetta; †Civettictis braini; †Civettictis vulpidens

= Civettictis =

Civettictis Temporal range: Late Pliocene - Recent

Genus of mammal

Civettictis is a genus of viverrid that contains the extant African civet (Civettictis civetta) and a recently described extinct relative from the Plio-Pleistocene of South Africa known as Civettictis braini and Civettictis vulpidens.

== Evolution ==
A 2006 phylogenetic study showed that the African civet is closely related to the genus Viverra. It was estimated that the Civettictis-Viverra clade diverged from Viverricula around 16.2 Mya; the African civet split from Viverra 12.3 Mya. The authors suggested that the subfamily Viverrinae should be bifurcated into Genettinae (Poiana and Genetta) and Viverrinae (Civettictis, Viverra and Viverricula). The following cladogram is based on this study.

- - - Small Indian civet (Viverricula indica)
    - - African civet (Civettictis civetta)
      - Viverra
        - Large Indian civet (Viverra zibetha)
        - Large-spotted civet (V. megaspila)
        - Malayan civet (V. tangalunga)
  - - Genetta
    - Poiana
