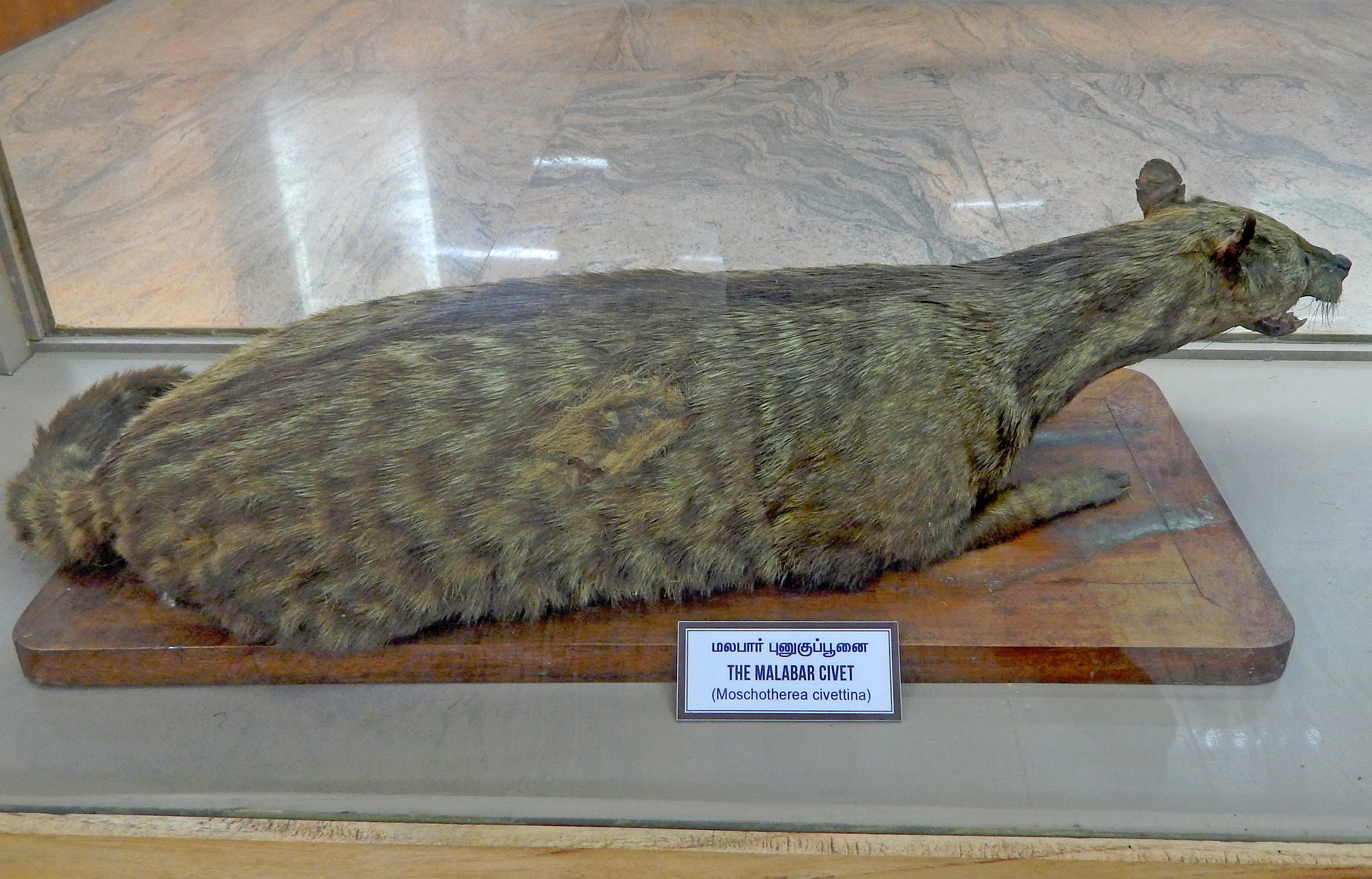
- Stuffed specimen at Government Museum, Chennai

Conservation status
- Critically endangered, possibly extinct (IUCN 3.1)
- CITES Appendix III

Scientific classification
- Kingdom: Animalia
- Phylum: Chordata
- Class: Mammalia
- Order: Carnivora
- Family: Viverridae
- Genus: Viverra
- Species: V. civettina

Binomial name
- Viverra civettina Blyth, 1862
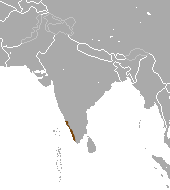
- Malabar large-spotted civet range

= Malabar large-spotted civet =

Species of carnivore

The Malabar large-spotted civet (Viverra civettina), also known as the Malabar civet, is a viverrid endemic to the Western Ghats of India. It is listed as critically endangered on the IUCN Red List as the population is estimated to number fewer than 250 mature individuals. It has not been recorded during surveys carried out between 1990 and 2014. In the early 1990s, isolated populations still survived in less disturbed areas of South Malabar but were seriously threatened by habitat destruction and hunting outside protected areas.

It is known as Kannan chandu, Male meru and veruku in Kerala, and in Karnataka as Mangala kutri, Bal kutri and Dodda punugina.

== Taxonomy ==
Viverra civettina was the scientific name proposed by Edward Blyth in 1862 for a civet specimen from southern Malabar. Reginald Innes Pocock considered V. megaspila and V. civettina to be distinct species. Ellerman and Morrison-Scott considered V. civettina a subspecies of V. megaspila. IUCN Red List considers it a distinct species.

There is some controversy as to whether the Malabar civet is even native to the Western Ghats or whether it is a valid species. Background information for the specimens is scant, so there is little to no information on its ecology or habits. In spite of the heavy habitat destruction in the region, the civet still seems unusually threatened for a small, generalist carnivore. The region where the civet was known to occur is the site of a major trading port, formerly including the trade of civets such as the large-spotted civet. Due to this, there is some speculation on whether the Malabar civet is an introduced population of the large-spotted civet that eventually died off.

== Characteristics ==
The Malabar large-spotted civet is dusky gray. It has a dark mark on the cheek, large transverse dark marks on the back and sides and two obliquely transverse dark lines on the neck. These dark marks are more pronounced than in the large Indian civet. Its throat and neck are white. A mane starts between the shoulders. Its tail is ringed with dark bands. The feet are dark. It differs from the large-spotted civet by the greater nakedness of the soles of the feet. The hairs on the interdigital webs between the digital pads form submarginal patches; the skin of the plantar pad is naked in front and at the sides. There are remnants of the metatarsal pads on the hind foot as two naked spots, the external a little above the level of the hallux, the internal considerably higher. A male individual kept in the Zoological Gardens of Trivandrum in the 1930s measured 30 in (76 cm) in head and body with a 13 in (33 cm) long tail and weighed 14.5 lb (6.6 kg).

== Distribution and habitat ==
In the 19th century, the Malabar civet occurred throughout the Malabar coast from the latitude of Honnavar to Kanyakumari. It inhabited the forests and richly wooded lowland, and was occasionally found on elevated forest tracts. It was considered abundant in Travancore.

Until the 1960s, extensive deforestation has reduced most of the natural forests in the entire stretch of the coastal Western Ghats. By the late 1960s, the Malabar civet was thought to be near extinction. In 1987, one individual was sighted in Kerala.

In 1987, two skins were obtained near Nilambur in northern Kerala, an area that is dominated by cashew and rubber plantations. Two more skins were found in this area in 1990. These plantations probably held most of the surviving population, as these were little disturbed and provided a dense understorey of shrubs and grasses. Large-scale clearance for planting rubber trees threatened this habitat.

Interviews conducted in the early 1990s among local hunters indicated the presence of Malabar civet in protected areas of Karnataka. During camera trapping surveys in lowland evergreen and semi-evergreen forests in the Western Ghats of Karnataka and Kerala from April 2006 to March 2007, no photographic record was obtained in a total of 1,084 camera trap nights.

== Ecology and behavior ==
The Malabar civet is considered nocturnal and so elusive that little is known about its biology and ecology apart from habitat use.

== Threats ==
Until a few decades ago, local merchants in Kerala reared Malabar civets to obtain civetone, an extract from the scent gland, which was used in medicine, and as an aromatic.

It is now seriously threatened by habitat destruction and fragmentation. Until the 1990s, it was confined to remnant forests and disturbed thickets in cashew and rubber plantations in northern Kerala, where the hunting pressure was another major threat.

== Alleged sighting ==
During the COVID-19 pandemic and the subsequent lockdown of India, a video clip of an unidentified civet walking the deserted streets of Meppayur was uploaded on Twitter. The civet was identified by its uploader as a Malabar civet and the clip subsequently went viral online. However, numerous experts identified the civet in the video as actually being the small Indian civet (Viverricula indica), a similar-looking but far more common species.
