= Civettictis braini =

Civettictis braini Temporal range: Late Pliocene - Early Pleistocene

Scientific classification
- Kingdom: Animalia
- Phylum: Chordata
- Class: Mammalia
- Order: Carnivora
- Family: Viverridae
- Genus: Civettictis
- Species: †C. braini

Binomial name
- †Civettictis braini Fourvel, 2018

Extinct species of civet

Civettictis braini is an extinct species of civet that lived in South Africa during the Plio-Pleistocene.

Civettictis braini differs significantly from the extant African civet in its dental proportions. Its canine and three premolars are relatively robust, and its carnassials and two molars are extremely reduced. Fossils have been found at the Kromdraai site and have been dated to around 2 million years ago.
