= Mioparadoxurus =

Mioparadoxurus Temporal range: Late Miocene, 8–6.4 Ma

Scientific classification
- Kingdom: Animalia
- Phylum: Chordata
- Class: Mammalia
- Order: Carnivora
- Family: Viverridae
- Subfamily: Paradoxurinae
- Genus: †Mioparadoxurus; Morales & Pickford, 2011

Type species
- †Mioparadoxurus meini Morales & Pickford, 2011

Other Species
- Mioparadoxurus micros Abbas et al., 2025

Extinct genus of mammals

Mioparadoxurus ("Miocene paradoxical tail") is an extinct genus of small to large sized paradoxurine viverrid that lived during Late Miocene of Sivalik Hills. The type species, Mioparadoxurus meini, is known from Chinji Formation of Haritalyangar region of Himachal Pradesh, India, while the second species, Mioparadoxurus micros, is from Dhok Pathan Formation of Salt Range of Punjab, Pakistan.

== Discovery and naming ==
The holotype of Mioparadoxurus meini(GSI K29-469) was collected by Lahiri in 1933 from Haritalyangar region of Himachal Pradesh and is catalogued in Geological Survey of India's Kolkata museum.

Later in 2011, Jorge Morales and Martin Pickford described the species as a new genus and species of paradoxurine civet, Mioparadoxurus meini. The genus name, Mioparadoxurus, is the combination of two words, Mio for the Miocene epoch and paradoxurus after the genus Paradoxurus, the species etymology meini is currently unknown.

The holotype of the second species, Mioparadxurus micros(PUPC 16/414) was collected from the Hasnot of Punjab, Pakistan near the outcrops of Kanhatti village.

Later in 2025, Abbas and collegeous described the specimen as a new species of Mioparadoxurus, where the species name micros is derived from the Greek word mikrós(μικρός) meaning small, in reference to its small size compared to Mioparadoxurus meini.

== Description ==
The dentition of Mioparadoxurus shows morphological similarities to Asian palm civet, Brown palm civet and Golden palm civet despite the size difference, though it is distinct from other paradoxurines by having a less molarised and primitive p4 that lacks additional cusplets compared to extant species, though the difference is not that well defined in the m1, but the tendency of paraconid is more simple than the other paradoxurines. The species Mioparadoxurus micros is distinct from Mioparadoxurus meini by having slightly longer and highly crowned talonid, smaller size and having undivided hypoconulid.

=== Size ===
The p4 of Mioparadoxurus meini has a dimension of 11.5 x 6.5 mm², while the m1 has a dimension of 16 x 10 mm², based on the m1 size the M. meini was larger than most viverrids like Vishnuictis hasnoti, Vishnuictis chinjiensis, Vishnuictis salmontanus and Parakichechia sikandari but smaller than Vishnuictis plectilodous. The other species Mioparadoxurus micros is only known from a molar tooth that has dimensions of 12 x 6.8 mm², making it smaller than M. meini and other large viverrids.
