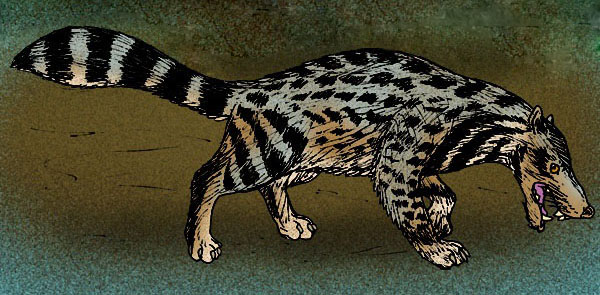

Scientific classification
- Kingdom: Animalia
- Phylum: Chordata
- Class: Mammalia
- Order: Carnivora
- Family: Viverridae
- Genus: Viverra
- Species: †V. leakeyi

Binomial name
- †Viverra leakeyi Leakey, 1982

Synonyms
- Civettictis leakeyi

= Viverra leakeyi =

Viverra leakeyi Temporal range: Late Miocene to Pleistocene

Extinct species of carnivore

Viverra leakeyi, also known as Leakey's civet or the giant civet, is an extinct species of civet. Its fossils have been found in Africa, from Langebaanweg, Ethiopia, Tanzania, and the Omo Valley.

== Description ==
Being the largest viverrid currently known to ever exist, it grew to about the size of a small leopard, around 40 kilograms (88 lb) and 59 centimetres (23 in) high at the shoulder. V. leakeyi looked physically similar to living Asiatic civet species but is thought to be more closely related to the African Civettictis civetta due to their location.

== Diet and behavior ==
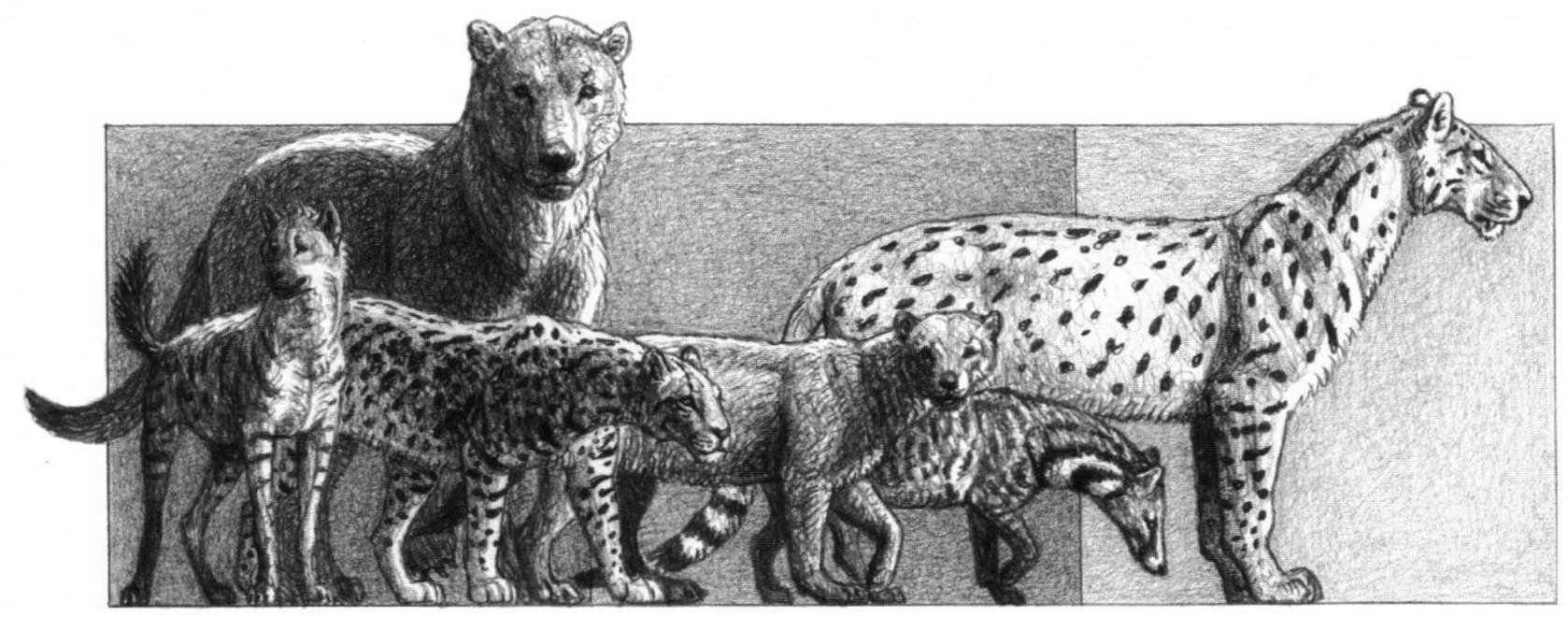
Life restoration of V. leakeyi (second from right) and other Late Miocene African carnivorans

This civet's dentition indicates it more than likely was strictly carnivorous. In comparison, living civet species are observed to be omnivorous instead. Because of V. leakeyi's size and dentition, the living animal is thought to be an active predator.
