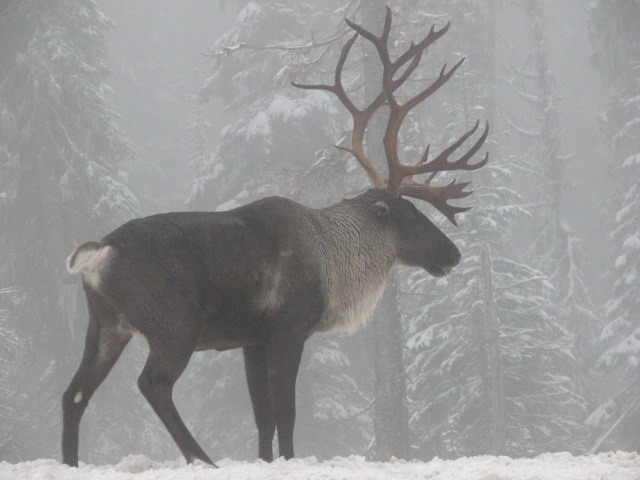
- Selkirk Mountains caribou on Idaho in 2007

Conservation status
- Critically Imperiled (NatureServe)

Scientific classification
- Kingdom: Animalia
- Phylum: Chordata
- Class: Mammalia
- Infraclass: Placentalia
- Order: Artiodactyla
- Family: Cervidae
- Subfamily: Capreolinae
- Genus: Rangifer
- Species: R. tarandus
- Subspecies: R. t. montanus

Trinomial name
- Rangifer tarandus montanus (Seton, 1899)

= Selkirk Mountains caribou =

Subspecies of caribou

The Selkirk Mountains caribou (Rangifer tarandus montanus) is a subspecies of caribou that inhabits British Columbia.

== Taxonomy ==
Rangifer montanus was the scientific name used by Ernest Thompson Seton for a bull from the Illecillewaet watershed in 1899. In 1951, John Reeves Ellerman and Terence Morrison-Scott reclassified Rangifer as a monotypic genus, thus placing montanus as a subspecies. When reindeer are classified as six species, the Selkirk Mountains caribou is classified as Rangifer arcticus montanus.

The western montane caribou (R. t. fortidens, R. t. montanus, and R. t. osborni) were considered ecotypes of woodland caribou, but they originate from two distinct lineages, the Euro-Beringian (BEL) and North American (NAL) lineages respectively.

=== Evolution ===
The cervid family first appears in the fossil record during the Miocene, and the subfamily Capreolinae between 7.7 and 11.5 million years ago, in Central Asia. The Rangifer lineage originated during the Late Pliocene or Early Pleistocene in North America. About 70,000 years ago, a lineage of reindeer divided into the BEL and NAL lineages. The BEL lineage is the more diverse of the two and expanded to North America from Beringia around 8,000 years ago, while the NAL lineage evolved south of the Laurentide and Cordilleran ice sheets.

DNA evidence suggests that Selkirk Mountains caribou from the Columbia North population had no admixture with NAL populations. The western montane caribou split from the barren-ground caribou around 60,550 years ago.

== Description ==
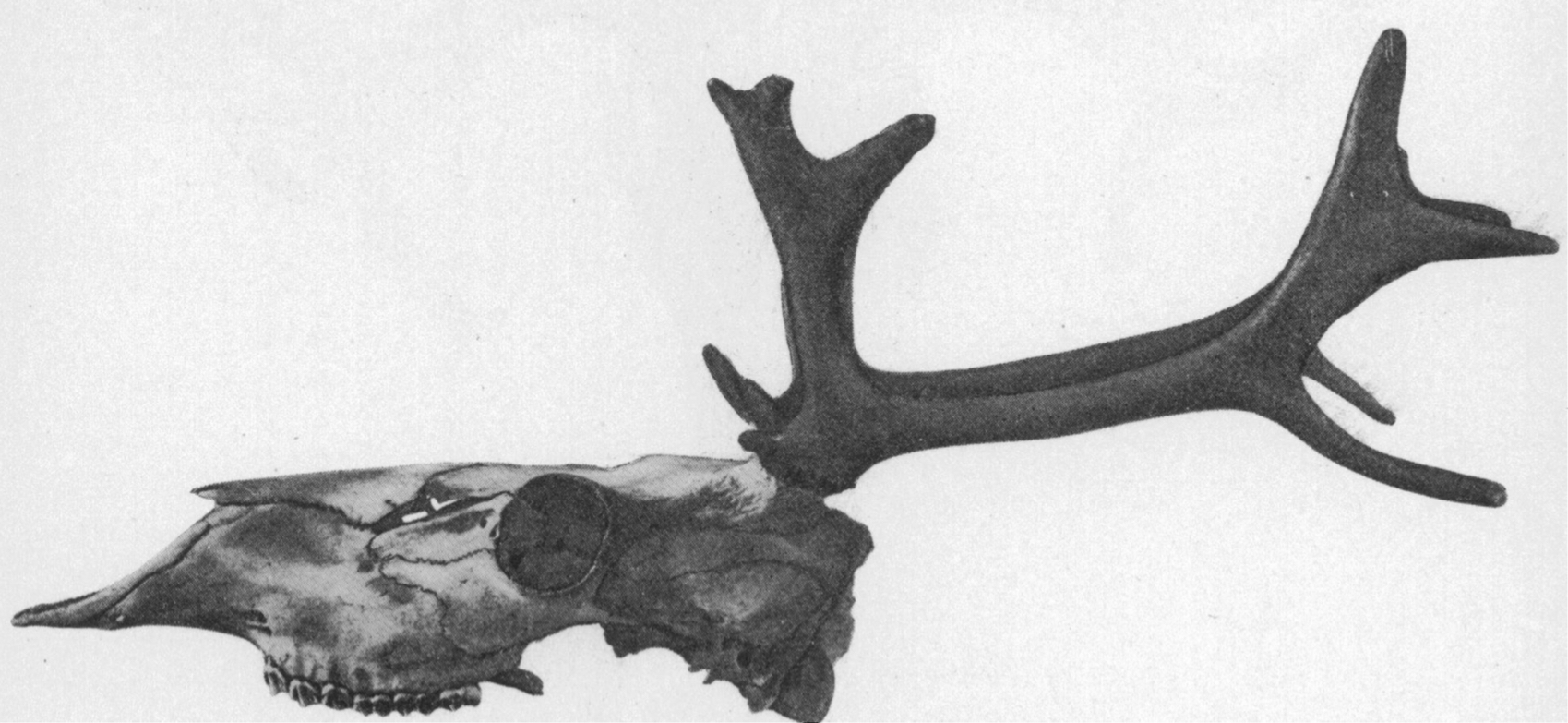
Skull of R. t. montanus, seen from the right

The Selkirk Mountains caribou is a large subspecies of caribou, about the same size of Osborn's caribou. Bulls' fur in autumn is blackish brown throughout most of the body, with some individuals having black from the hind of the withers to the rump. The lower body, flanks, and shoulders are a lighter colour while the neck is greyish white. Cows have pure white lips and darker fur compared to bulls.

The antlers are shorter than those of Osborn's caribou and are similar to those of boreal woodland caribou and Newfoundland caribou, but are lighter and more slender than those of the latter subspecies.

On average, bulls have a body length of 86 in (7.2 ft), while cows are about 79.5 in (6.63 ft) long. Cows have a tail measuring around 7.5 in (19 cm), longer than bull's tails, which are about 7 in (18 cm) long. Caribou up to 600 lb (270 kg) have been reported.

== Distribution ==
Currently, the Selkirk Mountains caribou is found solely in British Columbia. Around the time of Seton's description, they may have ranged southwards to the Cascade Range in Oregon.

== Literature cited ==
- Allen, J.A. (1902). "Description of a new caribou from northern British Columbia and remarks on Rangifer montanus". Bulletin of the American Museum of Natural History. 16 (1).
- Harding, Lee E. (2022). "Available names for Rangifer (Mammalia, Artiodactyla, Cervidae) species and subspecies". ZooKeys (1119): 117–151. Bibcode:2022ZooK.1119..117H. doi:10.3897/zookeys.1119.80233. ISSN 1313-2989. PMC 9848878. PMID 36762356.
- Layser, Earle F. (1974). A Review of the Mountain Caribou of Northeastern Washington and Adjacent Northern Idaho. Journal of the Idaho Academy of Sciences.
- Lydekker, R. (1915). Catalogue of the Ungulate Mammals in the British Museum (Natural History). Order of the Trustees. OCLC 849065934.
- Seton, E. T. (1927). Lives of Game Animals. Vol. 3. Doubleday, Page. OCLC 1196044667.
- Seton, E. T. (1899). "Preliminary description of a new caribou". Ottawa Naturalist. 13 (1). Ottawa Field-Naturalists' Club.
