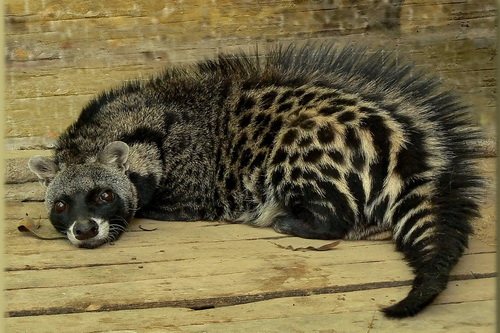

Conservation status
- Least Concern (IUCN 3.1)
- CITES Appendix III

Scientific classification
- Kingdom: Animalia
- Phylum: Chordata
- Class: Mammalia
- Order: Carnivora
- Family: Viverridae
- Genus: Civettictis
- Species: C. civetta

Binomial name
- Civettictis civetta (Schreber, 1776)

Subspecies
- C. c. civetta (Schreber, 1776); C. c. congica Cabrera, 1929; C. c. schwarzi Cabrera, 1929; C. c. australis Lundholm, 1955; C. c. volkmanni Lundholm, 1955; C. c. pauli Kock, Künzel and Rayaleh, 2000
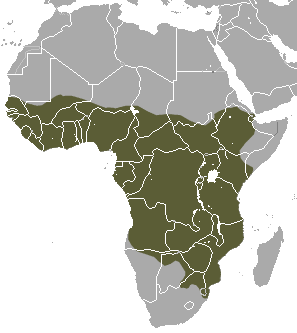
- Range of the African civet

Synonyms
- List: Viverra civetta Schreber, 1776; V. poortmanni Pucheran, 1855

= African civet =

Species of carnivore

The African civet (Civettictis civetta) is a large viverrid native to sub-Saharan Africa, where it is considered common and widely distributed in woodlands and secondary forests. It has been listed as least concern on the IUCN Red List since 2008. In some countries, it is threatened by hunting, and wild-caught individuals are kept for producing civetone for the perfume industry.

The African civet is primarily nocturnal and spends the day sleeping in dense vegetation, but wakes up at sunset. It is a solitary mammal with a unique coloration: the black and white blotches covering its coarse pelage and rings on the tail are an effective cryptic pattern. The black bands surrounding its eyes closely resemble those of the raccoon. Other distinguishing features are its disproportionately large hindquarters and its erectile dorsal crest. It is an omnivorous generalist, preying on small vertebrates, invertebrates, eggs, carrion, and vegetable matter. It is one of the few carnivores capable of eating toxic invertebrates such as termites and millipedes. It detects prey primarily by smell and sound rather than by sight. It is the only living member of the genus Civettictis.

== Taxonomy and evolution ==
Viverra civetta was the scientific name introduced in 1776 by Johann Christian Daniel von Schreber when he described African civets based on previous descriptions and accounts. Schreber is therefore considered the binomial authority. In 1915, Reginald Innes Pocock described the structural differences between feet of African and large Indian civet (Viverra zibetha) specimens in the zoological collection of the Natural History Museum, London. Because of marked differences, he proposed Civettictis as a new genus, with C. civetta as only species. The following subspecies were proposed in the 20th century:

- C. c. congica described by Ángel Cabrera in 1929 was a zoological specimen from the upper Congo River.
- C. c. schwarzi was proposed by Cabrera in 1929 for African civet specimens from East Africa.
- C. c. australis described by Bengt G. Lundholm in 1955 was based on a male type specimen and three paratype specimens collected near the Olifants River in northeastern Transvaal province.
- C. c. volkmanni also described by Lundholm in 1955 was a specimen from the vicinity of Otavi in Namibia.
- C. c. pauli described in 2000 by Dieter Kock, Künzel and Rayaleh was a specimen collected close to the coast near Djibouti.

A 1969 study noted that this civet showed enough differences from the rest of the viverrines in terms of dentition to be classified under its own genus.

=== Evolution ===
A 2006 phylogenetic study showed that the African civet is closely related to the genus Viverra. It was estimated that the Civettictis-Viverra clade diverged from Viverricula around 16.2 Mya; the African civet split from Viverra 12.3 Mya. The authors suggested that the subfamily Viverrinae should be bifurcated into Genettinae (Poiana and Genetta) and Viverrinae (Civettictis, Viverra, and Viverricula). The following cladogram is based on this study.

- - - Small Indian civet (Viverricula indica)
    - - African civet (Civettictis civetta)
      - Viverra
        - Large Indian civet (Viverra zibetha)
        - Large-spotted civet (V. megaspila)
        - Malayan civet (V. tangalunga)
  - - Genetta
    - Poiana

== Etymology ==
The generic name Civettictis is a fusion of the French word civette and the Greek word ictis, meaning "weasel". The specific name civetta and the common name "civet" come from the French civette or the Arabic zabād or sinnawr al-zabād ("civet cat").

=== Local and indigenous names ===
- In Tigrinya: ዝባድ (zibad)
- In Akan: kankane
- In Luganda: Ffumbe, Effumbe
- In Yoruba: Ẹtà, àgútà
- In Igbo: Edi

== Characteristics ==
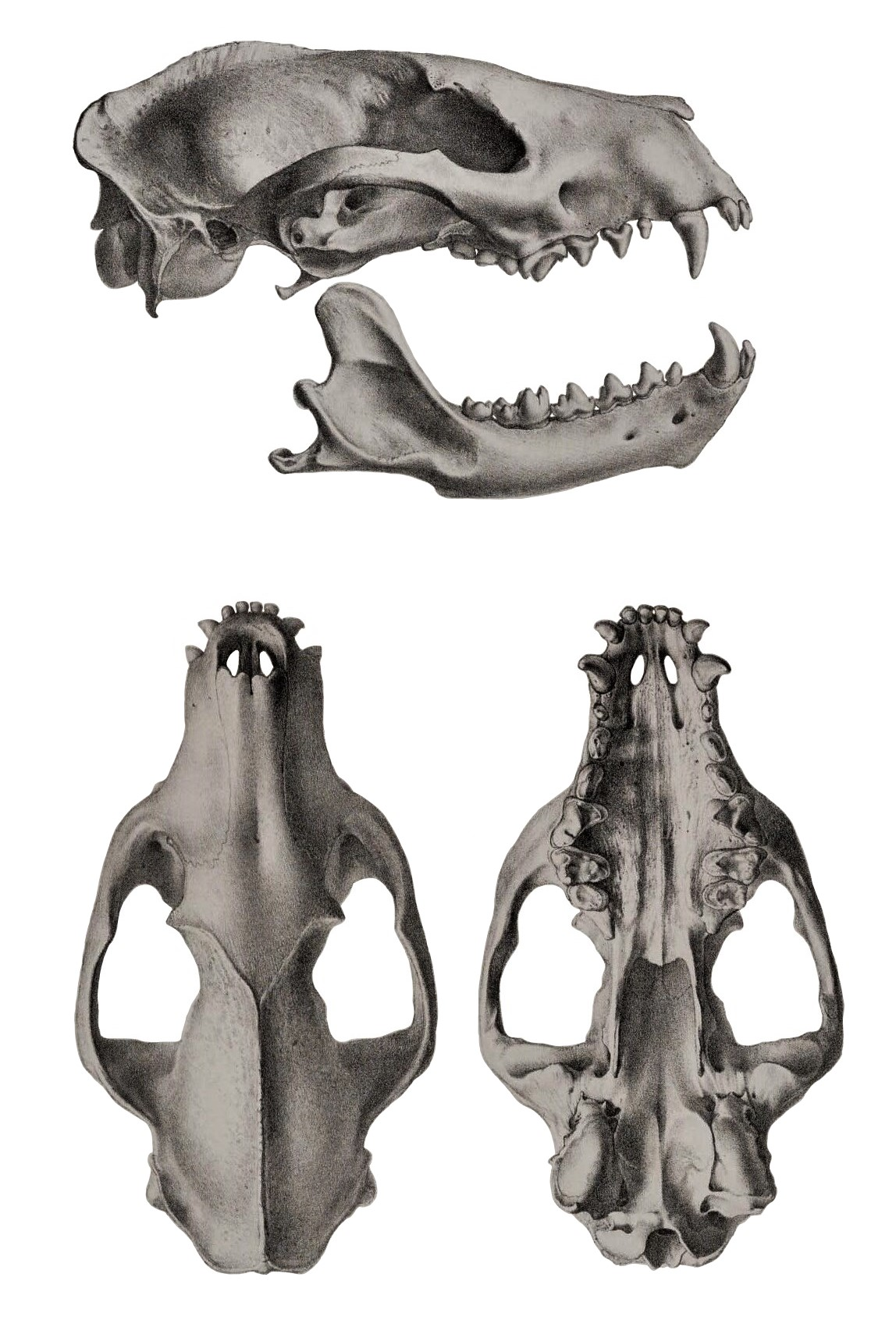
Skull

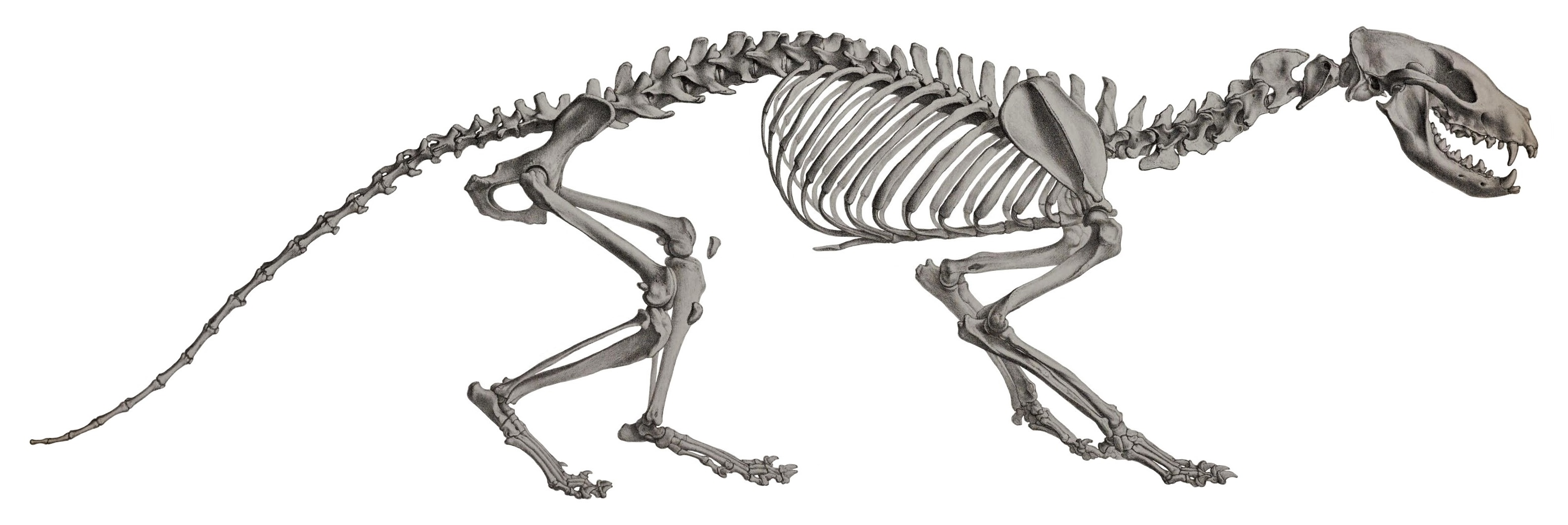
Skeleton

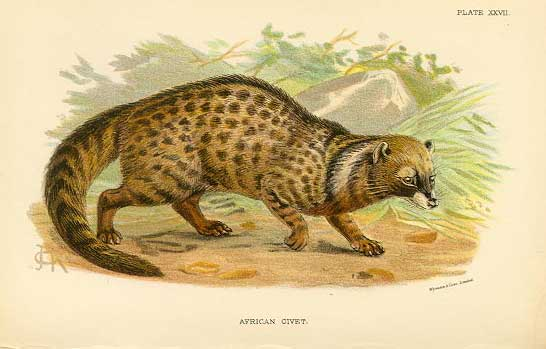
Drawing of an African civet

The African civet has a coarse and wiry fur that varies in colour from white to creamy yellow to reddish on the back. The stripes, spots, and blotches are deep brown to black. Horizontal lines are prominent on the hind limbs, spots are normally present on its midsection and fade into vertical stripes above the forelimbs. Its muzzle is pointed, ears small and rounded. A black band stretches across its small eyes, and two black bands are around its short broad neck. Following the spine of the animal extending from the neck to the base of the tail is the erectile dorsal crest. The hairs of the erectile crest are longer than those of the rest of the pelage.

The sagittal crest of its skull is well-developed providing a large area for attachment of the temporal muscle. The zygomatic arch is robust and provides a large area for attachment of the masseter muscle. This musculature and its strong mandible give it a powerful bite. Its dental formula is 3.1.4.23.1.4.2. Its black paws are compact with hairless soles, five digits per manus in which the first toe is slightly set back from the others. Its long, curved claws are semi-retractile. Its head-and-body length is 67–84 cm (26–33 in), with a 34–47 cm (13–19 in) long tail. The average weight is 11 to 15 kg (24 to 33 lb) within a range of 7 to 20 kg (15 to 44 lb). It is the largest viverrid in Africa. Only the binturong is likely heavier among the world's viverrids. Its shoulder height averages 40 cm (16 in). Both male and female have perineal and anal glands, which are bigger in males. The perineal glands are located between the scrotum and the penis in males, and between the anus and the vulva in females.

== Distribution and habitat ==
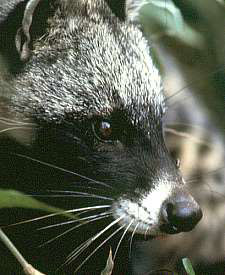
Head of African civet

African civets typically sleep during the day in the tall grasses near water sources in central and southern Africa. It often inhabits savannahs, forests, and sometimes near rivers as the tall grasses and thickets present provide them with necessary cover during the day. In Guinea's National Park of Upper Niger, it was recorded during surveys conducted in 1996 to 1997. In Gabon's Moukalaba-Doudou National Park, it was photographed close to forested areas during a survey in 2012. In Batéké Plateau National Park, it was recorded in gallery forest along the Mpassa River during surveys conducted between June 2014 and May 2015.

In the Republic of Congo, it was recorded in the Western Congolian forest–savanna mosaic of Odzala-Kokoua National Park during surveys in 2007.

In the transboundary Dinder–Alatash (Sudan and Ethiopia) protected area complex it was recorded during surveys between 2015 and 2018. It is also frequently spotted in Ethiopia's northern Degua Tembien massif.

== Behaviour and ecology ==
African civets deposit their feces in large piles called latrines, or specifically "civetries". The latrines are characterized by fruits, seeds, exoskeletons of insect and millipede rings, and occasionally clumps of grass. The role of civet latrines as a mechanism of seed dispersal and forest regeneration is still being researched. Like felids, male African civets scent mark by spraying urine backwards.

African civets are typically solitary creatures. They use their perineal gland secretion to mark their territories around their civetries. These markings typically follow common routes and paths and lie within 100 meters of civetries 96.72% of the time.

If an African civet feels threatened, it raises its dorsal crest to make itself look larger and thus more formidable and dangerous to attack. This behavior is a predatory defense.

=== Feeding ===
Research in southeastern Nigeria revealed that the African civet has an omnivorous diet. It feeds on rodents like giant pouched rats (Cricetomys), Temminck's mouse (Mus musculoides), Tullberg's soft-furred mouse (Praomys tulbergi), greater cane rat (Thryonomys swinderianus), and typical striped grass mouse (Lemniscomys striatus), amphibians and small reptiles like Hallowell's toad (Amietophrynus maculatus), herald snake (Crotaphopeltis hotamboeia), black-necked spitting cobra (Naja nigricollis), common agama (Agama agama), and Mabuya skinks, birds, millipedes, and insects such as Orthoptera, Coleoptera, and Blattodea, as well as carrion, eggs, fruits (such as Strychnos), berries and seeds. African civets can take prey as large as hares but can be somewhat clumsy killers with sizable prey. Stomach content of three African civets in Botswana included foremost husks of fan palm (Hyphaene petersiana) and jackalberry (Diospyros mespiliformis), and some remains of African red toad (Schismaderma carens), Acrididae grasshoppers and larvae of Dytiscidae beetles.

Green grass is also frequently found in feces, and this seems to be linked to the eating of snakes and amphibians.

=== Reproduction ===
Captive females are polyestrous. Mating lasts 40 to 70 seconds. In Southern Africa, African civets probably mate from October to November, and females give birth in the rainy season between January and February.

The average lifespan of a captive African civet is 15 to 20 years. Females create a nest which is normally in dense vegetation and commonly in a hole dug by another animal. Female African civets normally give birth to one to four young. The young are born in advanced stages compared to most carnivores. They are covered in a dark, short fur and can crawl at birth. The young leave the nest after 18 days but are still dependent on the mother for milk and protection for another two months.

== Threats ==
In 2006, it was estimated that about 9,400 African civets are hunted yearly in the Nigerian part and more than 5,800 in the Cameroon part of the Cross–Sanaga–Bioko coastal forests. Skins and skulls of African civets were found in 2007 at the Dantokpa Market in southern Benin, where it was among the most expensive small carnivores. Local hunters considered it a rare species, indicating that the population declined due to hunting for trade as bushmeat.

The African civet has historically been hunted for the secretion of its perineal glands. This substance, marketed as civet oil, has been used as a basic ingredient for many perfumes for hundreds of years. In Ethiopia, African civets are hunted alive, and are kept in small cages. Most die within three weeks after capture, most likely due to stress. Extraction of the civetone is cruel and has been criticised by animal rights activists. The writer Daniel Defoe once invested in a scheme to raise civets in captivity for their secretions.

The population of African civet in Botswana is listed under Appendix III of the Convention on International Trade in Endangered Species of Wild Fauna and Flora (CITES).
