= Bernarr Rainbow =

English historian, organist, and choir master (1914–1998)

Bernarr Joseph George Rainbow (2 October 1914 – 17 March 1998) was a historian of music education, organist, and choir master from the United Kingdom.

== Life and career ==
Born on 2 October 1914 in Battersea, London, United Kingdom, Bernarr Rainbow was the son of Ephraim James Rainbow (1888–1983), a cabinet-maker at Buckingham Palace, who later became the Curator of Pictures at Hampton Court. Rainbow first became a church chorister when his family moved to Clapham, and he was intrigued by watching the organist play.

After another move he attended Rutlish School in Merton. Whilst still at school, Bernarr was appointed the organist and choirmaster at St James's, Merton, later holding similar posts at St Mary's, East Molesey and St Andrew's, Wimbledon.

After his family moved to Hampton Court, Bernarr attended Trinity College of Music between 1933 and 1939, where he was a pupil of Dr William Lovelock. His 21st birthday was marked by a reception and dance at Hampton Court attended by 80 guests. While studying at Trinity he earned a living in the Map Branch of the Land Registry near Lincoln's Inn. Rainbow's studies were interrupted by World War II and he served with the Army in North Africa and Italy, until he was invalided out in 1944. In 1941 Rainbow married Olive Grace Still (1915–1996), at the church of St Mary the Virgin, Merton, composing the music for the service himself.

In September 1944 he became organist of the Parish Church of All Saints Church, High Wycombe and, a few months later, the Senior Music Master at Royal Grammar School, High Wycombe. He made a considerable public impact at High Wycombe. He produced Gilbert and Sullivan operettas at the Royal Grammar School, put on concerts at the parish church, and started a week-long annual Festival there in 1946. Bernarr's pupils won awards and scholarships and in 1947 representatives from 30 local choirs joined in Handel's Messiah. Bernarr conducted the High Wycombe String Orchestra and was the soloist in his own Piano Concerto.

In 1951 the High Wycombe Parish Church Choir was chosen to sing evensong in the Festival Church on the new South Bank site. He turned the Royal Grammar School at High Wycombe into a singing school. Bernarr realised that the quality of music teaching in schools was paramount. This meant focussing on the teachers themselves. Thus in 1952 he became Director of Music at The College of St Mark and St John, Chelsea, the Church of England College for teachers, a remarkable community whose members have stayed friends. Later he became Head of Music at Gypsy Hill College, now Kingston University, and retired in 1978.

His distinguished record was acknowledged when he was made a Fellow of the Royal Society of Arts in 1994 and an Honorary Fellow of Trinity College in the following year. He was President of the Campaign for the Defence of the Traditional Cathedral Choir and in 1996 he established the Bernarr Rainbow Award for School Music Teachers.

Bernarr Rainbow died in Esher, Surrey, on 17 March 1998 at the age of 83.

== Awards and qualifications ==
DLitt, PhD, MEd, ARCM, LGSM, LRAM, FTCL, HonFTCL, FRSA

== Bernarr Rainbow Trust ==
The Bernarr Rainbow Trust was set up by Rainbow and Professor Peter Dickinson in 1996 to support projects connected with music education. The Trust now runs an annual award for school music teachers in conjunction with the Institute of Education, University of London; has presented five Bernarr Rainbow Lectures in London [published as "Music Education in Crisis - the Bernarr Rainbow Lectures and Other Assessments", Boydell, 2013]; and supports the publication of Rainbow's books and his series of Classic Texts in Music Education.

== Writings ==
- Music in the classroom, Heinemann (London, 1956).
- Handbook for music teachers, Novello (London, 1964).
- The land without music: musical education in England 1800-1860 and its continental antecedents, Novello (London, 1967) repr. Boydell.
- The choral revival in the Anglican church, 1839-1872, Barrie & Jenkins (London, 1970). repr. Boydell.
- John Curwen: a short critical biography, Novello (London, 1980). [In Bernarr Rainbow on Music - see below]
- English psalmody prefaces: popular methods of teaching, 1562-1835, Boethius Press (London, 1982) repr. Boydell.
- Onward from Butler: school music 1945-1985, Curwen Institute (London, 1985). [In Bernarr Rainbow on Music - see below]
- Music and the English public school, Boethius Press (London, 1990). [New, enlarged edition as Music in the Independent School, edited by Andrew Morris]
- Music in Educational Thought and Practice: a Survey from 800 BC, 2nd enlarged edition with Gordon Cox; foreword by Sir Peter Maxwell Davies. Boydell (Woodbridge, 2006).
- Four Centuries of Music Teaching Manuals 1518-1932, with an introduction by Gordon Cox. Boydell (Woodbridge, 2009).
- Bernarr Rainbow on Music: Selected Writings and a Memoir, edited by Gordon Cox, introduced by Charles Plummeridge. Boydell (Woodbridge, 2011)
- Music in Independent Schools, edited by Andrew Morris; introduced by Peter Dickinson. Boydell (Woodbridge, 2014).

== Sources ==
=== Primary sources ===
The personal papers of Bernarr Rainbow are held in the Archives of the Institute of Education, University of London , and the catalogue of his papers can be accessed through the online catalogue.

=== Published sources ===
- Dickinson, Peter (20 March 1998). "Obituary: Bernarr Rainbow". The Independent.
- Dickinson, Peter (2004). "Rainbow, Bernarr Joseph George (1914–1998)". Oxford Dictionary of National Biography. Oxford: Oxford University Press.
