= David Follett =

English museum curator (1907-1982)

Sir David Henry Follett FMA (5 September 1907 – 11 May 1982) was an English curator who was Director of the Science Museum, London from 1960 to 1973.

Follett was born in Kingston, Surrey, and attended Rutlish Grammar School (1919–26). He then studied physics in the Clarendon Laboratory at Oxford University as a student at Brasenose College.

Follett joined the Science Museum in 1937 as an Assistant Keeper, when Colonel E. E. B. Mackintosh was the Director. He was later Director of the museum from 1960 to 1973. Follett was also an author and a Fellow of the Museums Association.

Follett was knighted for his contribution to the museum world in 1967. He married Helen A. Wilson in 1932. Helen, Lady Follett, died in 1996.

== Books ==
- Follett, David, The Rise of the Science Museum under Henry Lyons. London: Science Museum, 1978. ISBN 0-901805-19-X.

Cultural offices
Preceded by Sir Terence Morrison-Scott	Director of the Science Museum; 1960–1973	Succeeded by Dame Margaret Weston
