= George Edward Cates =

English Victoria Cross recipient (1892-1917)

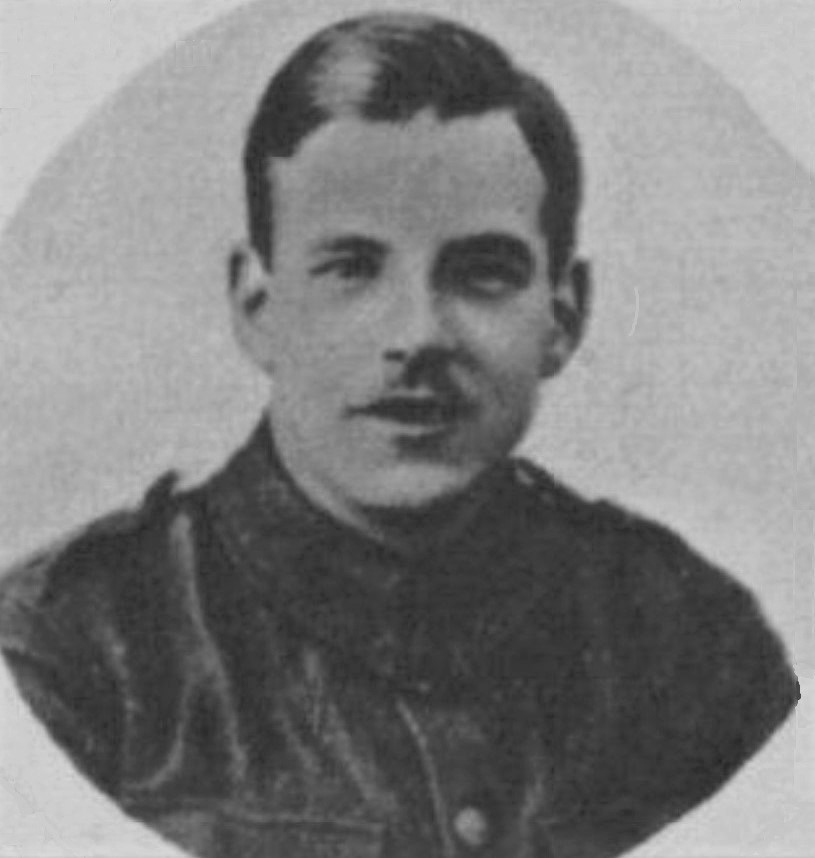
- Born: 9 May 1892; Wimbledon, London, England
- Died: 9 March 1917 (aged 24); Bouchavesnes, France
- Burial place: Hem Farm Military Cemetery, Hem-Monacu
- Military career
- Allegiance: United Kingdom
- Branch: British Army
- Service years: 1914–1917
- Rank: Second Lieutenant
- Units: Rifle Brigade (The Prince Consort's Own)
- Conflicts: World War I
- Awards: Victoria Cross

Second Lieutenant George Edward Cates VC (9 May 1892 – 9 March 1917) was a British Army officer and an English recipient of the Victoria Cross (VC), the highest and most prestigious award for gallantry in the face of the enemy that can be awarded to British and Commonwealth forces.

Cates was born on 9 May 1892 to George and Alice Ann Cates, of Wimbledon, London, the seventh of nine children. After attending Rutlish School in Merton, he worked as a clerk for an insurance company.

In December 1914, four months after the outbreak of the First World War, he joined the 28th London Regiment (Artists’ Rifles), and went to France in August 1915. He was later commissioned second lieutenant.

He was a 24 years old second lieutenant in the 2nd Battalion, Rifle Brigade (The Prince Consort's Own), British Army, during the First World War, and was awarded the VC for his actions on 8 March 1917 at Bouchavesnes, France.

== Citation ==
For most conspicuous bravery and self-sacrifice. When engaged with some other men in deepening a captured trench this officer struck with his spade a buried bomb, which immediately started to burn. 2nd Lt. Cates, in order to save the lives of his comrades, placed his foot on the bomb, which immediately exploded. He showed the most conspicuous gallantry and devotion to duty in performing the act which cost him his life, but saved the lives of others.

— The London Gazette, dated 11 May 1917

Cates died of his wounds the next day. Two of his brothers also died during the war.

His VC is displayed at the Royal Green Jackets (Rifles) Museum, Winchester, England.

Cates is commemorated on both the Wimbledon and Richardson Evans Memorial Fields war memorials, and has a plaque at the former.

== Bibliography ==
- Gliddon, Gerald (2012) [1998]. Arras and Messines 1917. VCs of the First World War. The History Press. ISBN 978-0-7524-6604-0.
