= Rutlish School =

Location
- Watery Lane; Merton Park, Greater London, SW20 9AD; England; 51.4092°N 0.2081°W

Information
- Type: Comprehensive Voluntary controlled school
- Motto: Modeste, Strenue, Sancte
- Established: 1895
- Founder: John Innes
- Local authority: Merton
- Department for Education URN: 102679 Tables
- Ofsted: Reports
- Headteacher: Laura Howarth
- Gender: Boys
- Age: 11 to 18
- Enrolment: 1349
- Houses: Argonauts, Carthaginians (formerly Crusaders), Kelts, Parthians, Romans, Spartans, Trojans and Vikings
- Colours: Blue & Yellow
- Former pupils: Old Rutlishians
- Website: www.rutlish.merton.sch.uk

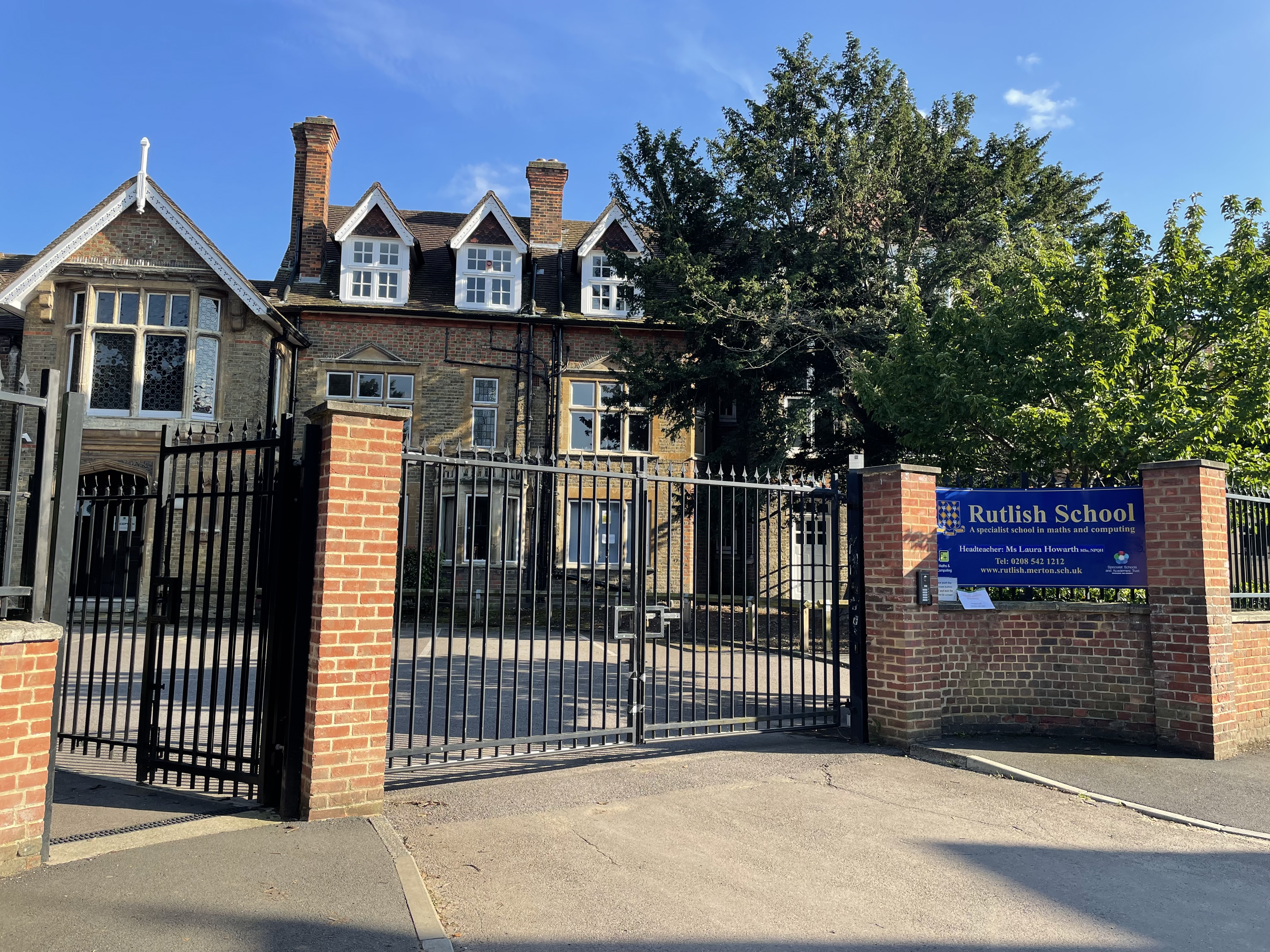
The school in 2021

Rutlish School is a state comprehensive school for boys, formerly a grammar school with the same name originally located on Rutlish Road, Merton Park, in southwest London, and relocated in 1957 on nearby Watery Lane, Merton Park.

== History ==
The school is named for and honours the benefactor William Rutlish, embroiderer to Charles II. Rutlish was a resident of the parish of Merton and is buried in the churchyard of the parish church of St Mary. Rutlish died in 1687 and left £400 (about £83,000 today) for the education of poor children of the parish.

By the 1890s the charity had accumulated a considerable excess of funds and John Innes, a local landowner and chairman of the board of trustees, used some of the excess to establish a school.

=== Grammar school ===
The first school building, established as a grammar school in the 1890s, was located in what is still designated Rutlish Road, off Kingston Road, by Merton Park station (now a tram stop). After World War II the school had outgrown its Victorian buildings (and the science block, built in the 1930s, had been destroyed as a result of a German air raid) so in the early 1950s, John Innes buildings off nearby Mostyn Road were converted for use as the Junior School.

Though the work was not completed and the heating system was not installed, this opened after a delay, in late September 1953. A new building was planned for the rest of the school, on the present site south of Watery Lane. The new school buildings opened in September 1957.

Both this and the Junior School were on land that had belonged to John Innes and which had been occupied until 1945 by the John Innes Horticultural Institution (now the John Innes Centre in Norwich). The original buildings in Rutlish Road were later temporarily used as a girls' school (Surrey County Council, Pelham County Secondary Girls School) and then a Middle School (London Borough of Merton, Pelham Middle School, until 1974), buildings subsequently demolished to be replaced by a mix of retirement and warden-assisted flats.

=== School buildings ===
The 1957 school buildings are arranged around three sides of a quadrangle. To the north is a four-storey main entrance block (which contained the school library on the top floor, and a CCF rifle range in the roof space) and a three-storey central block of general purpose classrooms facing Watery Lane. To the west is a two-storey science block and to the east a two-storey block containing the canteen on the ground floor and the school hall on the first floor. Attached to the rear of the east block is the school gym. Also in the middle of the two buildings is a maths block on the second floor.

Among the existing school buildings is one which has ties to John Innes. The "Manor House" adjacent to the school entrance on Watery Lane was Innes's home; a blue plaque records his association. The Manor House was used as the staff room and headmaster's office on the ground floor, and sixth form rooms on the first floor.

Now demolished were school buildings next to the playing field; these were once the library and offices of the John Innes Institution and had ranges of greenhouses attached. In the 1950s and early 1960s these old buildings were used by the first and second year classes (known as forms 2A, 2B, 2C, 3A, 3B, 3C and 3D, alternating each year with either a three or four form intake) and the long greenhouse was used as a lunchtime canteen and a cloakroom. Later, in the 1980s, they were art and music rooms. A little-known feature of the old building was a warren of hidden crawlspace passages, accessible from the second floor music room, from where clandestine spying operations on other classes could be undertaken.

The first year intake of pupils were allocated into “Forms” 2A, 2B and 2C. The second year were promoted to 3A, 3B and 3C.

The third year were 4A,4B and 4C and were relocated to the main school. Some kind of grade assignment occurred whereby the “brighter” pupils were assigned to 4A etc although results indicated there was no real scoring performed.

The next year was termed the “Remove” with forms designated RA, RB and RC. This was followed by the fifth year designated 5A, 5B and 5C.

Next was “Trans”, usually Trans A and Trans B as many pupils left following GCE’s (taken in 5th year). Sun Prefects were sometimes appointed from here. Last Year was 6th Form usually the realm of Prefects. A levels were taken here.

In the 1970s, part of the roof-space housed the 4 mm scale model railway layout. To the southeast aspect of the buildings was the Croquet Lawn, elegantly laid on a slope comparable to that of Yeovil Town Football Club, a small allotment area for the Gardening Club adjoined as well. There was also a pair of 'Fives' courts (Fives is a game like squash, but played with the hands not rackets).

A number of additional buildings have been constructed over the years to supplement the facilities of the 1950s buildings.

=== Comprehensive ===
Following the education reforms of the late 1960s, the school became a comprehensive although it retained many of its grammar school traditions long after the conversion - school houses (named after ancient warrior nations or groups), uniforms with house and school colours, a Combined Cadet Force (CCF), and prefects. For many years the school maintained a croquet lawn for the use of the headmaster and the prefects. The school also operated an exchange programme with Eton College for a number of years.

=== Three-tier system ===
In the 1970s the education system in Merton was altered to use a three-tier structure (primary, middle and high school) in place of the former two-tier structure and Rutlish lost the first three of its years. The school still retained the old year names; however, so that pupils starting at the school began as "fourth" years. The following years were named "remove", "fifth", "transitus" and "sixth" (actually a pupil's fifth year at the school if he remained that long). Transitus and sixth-form pupils had their own common room on the first floor of the main block.

== School motto ==
The school motto is: Modeste Strenue Sancte, meaning: "Be modest, be thorough and pursue righteousness".

== School houses ==
For most of the school's history, the pupils of the school have been assigned to houses. Although discontinued for some years, the system was reinstated in January 2010 with eight houses:

- Argonauts
- Carthaginians (formerly Crusaders),
- Kelts (a deliberate misspelling of Celts to differentiate the initial from Carthaginians)
- Parthians
- Romans
- Trojans
- Spartans
- Vikings

Various inter-house competitions, often of a sporting nature, are held.

== Notable alumni ==
- Tariq Ahmad, Baron Ahmad of Wimbledon, member of the House of Lords from 2010
- James Boiling, cricketer
- Tom Braddock, Labour MP from 1945 to 1950 of Mitcham (1898–1903)
- Jack Brewer 1948 Olympian
- Raymond Briggs, illustrator, best known for The Snowman (1945–52)
- Sir Derek Cons, judge of the Supreme Court of Hong Kong
- Gerry Cottle, former owner Gerry Cottle's Circus, Moscow State Circus, Chinese State Circus; owner Wookey Hole Caves (1956–61; ran away to join the circus)
- Jason Cundy, Chelsea, Crystal Palace and Tottenham football player.
- John Dennis, (1942–49), Bishop of St Edmundsbury and Ipswich from 1986 to 1996 and father of Hugh Dennis
- Sir Frank Edward Figgures, first secretary general from 1960 to 1965 of the European Free Trade Association (EFTA), and director general from 1971 to 1973 of the National Economic Development Office (NEDO) (1921–28)
- Steve Finnan, Liverpool and Ireland footballer (1989–1992)
- Sir David Follett, director from 1960 to 1973 of the Science Museum (1919–26)
- Tubby Hayes, jazz musician (1946–51)
- Neville Heath, murderer, executed in 1946 (1928–33)
- Tariq Knight, TV illusionist (1996–2000)
- Sir John Major, Prime Minister from 1990 to 1997 (1954–59)
- Dean McDonald English professional footballer (1998–2002)
- Sir Morien Morgan, aeronautical engineer and master from 1972 to 1978 of Downing College, Cambridge (1924–31)
- Geoff Norcott, comedian, writer and political commentator
- Sir Patrick Geoffrey O'Neill, professor of Japanese at the School of Oriental and African Studies, University of London
- Sir Frederick Page, aeronautical engineer (1928–35)
- Geoffrey Paul, Bishop of Bradford from 1981 to 1983 (1932-9)
- Chris Perry, footballer
- Bernarr Rainbow, organist (1926–33)
- John Rostill, musician, The Shadows third bass guitarist (1953–59)
- Douglas Seale, actor and director (1925–32)
- Stephen Shaw, Prisons and Probation Ombudsman since 2001 and director from 1981 to 1999 of the Prison Reform Trust (1964–71)
- Keith Sutton, artist (1935–40)
- Mick Talbot, musician
- Frank Taylor, Conservative MP from 1961 to 1974 for Manchester Moss Side (1919–26)
- Mark Thomas (1980–85) editor, 2003-08 of The People newspaper
- Sir Chris Wormald, permanent secretary of the Department of Health and Social Care

=== Victoria Cross holders ===
Two Old Rutlishians, George Edward Cates and John Dimmer, have been awarded the Victoria Cross.
