= Margaret Weston =

British director of the Science Museum, curator and electrical engineer (1926–2021

Dame Margaret Weston
- Born: Margaret Kate Weston; 7 March 1926; Carmarthen, Wales
- Died: 9 January 2021 (aged 94); Leonard Stanley, England
- Education: Aston University and University of London
- Occupation: Curator electrical engineer
- Known for: Director of the Science Museum, London

Dame Margaret Kate Weston, DBE, FMA (7 March 1926 – 9 January 2021) was a British museum curator who was the director of the Science Museum, London, between 1973 and 1986. She began her career as an electrical engineer before joining the Science Museum in 1955. Weston oversaw the expansion of the museum into the Science Museum Group, including the foundation of the National Railway Museum in York and the National Museum of Photography, Film and Television in Bradford. She also played a key role in acquiring Concorde 002, which is now housed at the Fleet Air Arm Museum in Yeovilton.

== Early life and education ==
Margaret Weston was born in Carmarthen, Wales, on 7 March 1926, and was raised in Oakridge, Gloucestershire, the only child of two headteachers, Margaret (née Bright) and Charles Weston. She was educated at Stroud High School.

During the war a German bomber crashed in the village and Margaret's father, who was also in the Home Guard, arrested the airman. Margaret held degrees from both Aston University and the University of London in Electrical Engineering and Mechanical Engineering, respectively. She later acknowledged the support she was given in engineering by a neighbour, Walter Gardiner, who used to let her use his workshop and lathe; they would repair bicycles together on Saturdays.

== Career ==
After graduation, she became an electrical engineer at the General Electric Company (GEC), one of only three women amongst 300 apprentices, and specialised in high-voltage insulation, and was eventually appointed to the senior technical staff of the company. In 1954, at the age of 28, she achieved the status of Chartered Electrical Engineer.

In 1955, she joined the Science Museum in London, as Assistant Keeper (First Class) of Electrical Engineering and Communications. She was promoted to Deputy Keeper of the Department of Electrical Engineering and Communications; in 1967, she was appointed Keeper of the Department of Museum Services at the Science Museum, the first time a woman was appointed as a Keeper there.

In 1973 she was appointed Director of the Science Museum, succeeding Sir David Follett, and becoming the first woman to serve as director of a British National Museum. She held the position until 1986, during which time she oversaw a significant expansion of what is now known as the Science Museum Group.

On her first day as Director, Weston visited York and announced the city as the home of the National Railway Museum; the museum was opened in 1975. She also oversaw the acquisition of Concorde 002, the second prototype of the aircraft, for the Science Museum. She described how the Museum acquired Concorde, saying, "I had a telephone call – it was all telephone calls in those earlier days, not e-mails – and the man didn't give his name or his department. But he just said, do you want Concorde 002? It's coming to the end of its test service. And I said, well I want to preserve it but I have no place to put it. But yes I'll take it." The aircraft made its last flight to the Fleet Air Arm Museum in Yeovilton in July 1976, where it is housed.

In 1976, she oversaw the display of an extensive collection of biomedical objects from Sir Henry Wellcome's Museum Collection, which were loaned to the Science Museum, broadening the museum's scope considerably. In 1980–81, two new galleries opened, "Glimpses of Medical History" and "The Science and Art of Medicine", to display the Wellcome material and other medical displays.

In 1980, Weston acquired a former Royal Air Force airfield at Wroughton, Wiltshire. The field was used to house large objects such as aircraft, trams and an inert nuclear missile, and was opened as the National Collections Centre.

Weston was instrumental in establishing the National Museum of Photography, Film and Television (now the National Media Museum) in Bradford, which opened on 16 June 1983 and featured the UK's largest cinema screen and the country's first IMAX cinema.

In 1984 she was invited to deliver the MacMillan Memorial Lecture to the Institution of Engineers and Shipbuilders in Scotland. She chose the subject "The Science Museum and Change – Over the last Thirty Years".

She was also president of the Heritage Railway Association until 2011 and the patron of the Stroudwater Textile Trust.

On her retirement in 1986, Weston was presented with a motorbike by the museum staff. In retirement, Weston continued to work in the museum sector as a volunteer. In Stroud, she was chair of the Cowle Trust, which opened a Museum in the Park and a walled garden.

Weston died from COVID-19 at a care home in Leonard Stanley, Gloucestershire, on 9 January 2021, at the age of 94.

== Honours and Legacy ==
Margaret Weston was appointed a Dame Commander of the Order of the British Empire (DBE) in the 1979 Birthday Honours. She was also made a Fellow of the Museums Association (FMA) in 1984. In 1984 she was made an Honorary Fellow of Newnham College, Cambridge. She received honorary degrees from the Universities of Salford, Manchester (1984), Aston, Bradford, Leeds, Loughborough and the Open University.

In 2018, she was made a Fellow of the Science Museum. The fellowship was presented by Dame Mary Archer at Dame Margaret's home.

Weston left a gift for Aston University in her will, this has contributed to the creation of a "Design Factory" with a space named in her honour.

== Bibliography ==
- Foreword for The Rise of the Science Museum under Henry Lyons by David Follett.
- Introduction for Beware of Trains by (the unrelated) David Weston.

Cultural offices
| Preceded by Sir David Follett | Director of the Science Museum; 1973–1986 | Succeeded by Sir Neil Cossons |
