= Frank Edward Figgures =

British civil servant

- Born: 5 March 1910
- Died: 27 November 1990 (aged 80)
- Education: New College, Oxford; Merton College, Oxford; Yale Law School
- Military career
- Allegiance: United Kingdom
- Service / branch: Royal Artillery
- Battles / wars: World War II

Sir Frank Edward Figgures KCB CMG (5 March 1910 – 27 November 1990) was a British civil servant, noted as the first secretary-general of the European Free Trade Association from 1960 to 1965. In this position he promoted a more united Europe through economic cooperation.

== Biography ==
Figgures was educated at Rutlish School, New College and Merton College, and Yale Law School. He was called to the Bar in 1936.

Figgures served in the Royal Artillery during World War II. In 1946 he served as under-Secretary to HM Treasury, helping in Britain's recovery effort, and from 1948 to 1951 he served as Director of Trade and Finance for the Organisation for Economic Co-operation and Development. He served in various other treasury positions before heading the EFTA in 1960.
