= James Boiling =

English cricketer

James Boiling (born 8 April 1968) is an Indian-born former English cricketer. He was a right-handed batsman and a right-arm off-break bowler. He was born in New Delhi and educated at Rutlish School in Merton, south London. At Rutlish, he came to prominence by winning the Daily Telegraph Young Bowler of the Year award in 1986, taking 94 wickets including 10 wickets for 30 runs against Wallington Grammar School.

Boiling's first-class career began in 1988, when he was signed by Surrey after appearing for them in the Second XI the previous year. This came straight off the back of appearing in all eight of the England Young Cricketers' appearances in the 1988 Youth Cricket World Cup. In this tournament, Boiling was one of the most successful bowlers, with a best performance of 3 wickets for 7 runs against Pakistan. Boiling also starred for the Combined Universities in their 1989 run to the quarter-finals of the Benson and Hedges Cup, during which they defeated Surrey and Worcestershire. Boiling's figures of 3 wickets for 9 runs from 8 overs against Surrey earned him the Gold Award. He became a regular member of the Surrey first team during the 1991 season, during which they reached the final of the NatWest Trophy. Boiling excelled in the semi-final, scoring 22 runs, taking 2 wickets for 22 runs, and taking a spectacular catch to dismiss Allan Lamb that was described by Richie Benaud as "one of the best catches you will ever see."

After a successful 1992 season, in which he took 45 first-class wickets including match figures of 10 for 203 against Gloucestershire, Boiling toured with the England A team to Australia. Although he played second fiddle to Peter Such, he took 3 for 93 against Tasmania, including Ricky Ponting for a duck. His 3 for 19 against Northern Territories included the wicket of Matthew Hayden. He was unlucky to have his toe broken whilst batting at the MCG against an Australian Academy XI, which effectively ended his chances of international selection. However, Boiling enjoyed a successful one-day season in 1993, taking 25 wickets in the 50 over AXA League and in 1994 helped to propel Surrey to the semi-finals of both the NatWest trophy and Benson and Hedges Cup. However, this was to prove his final year in the side, as he signed to Durham in time for 1995.

During 1995, Boiling hit his highest first-class score of 69 against a West Indies attack which featured Ian Bishop and Ottis Gibson and took two five-wicket hauls, the second of which (5 for 73) helped to win the game against Nottinghamshire. Boiling played with decreasing regularity during the 1996 and 1997 seasons, although he remained in the Limited Overs side until the 1998 season, which was his last.

Boiling will be remembered as a successful one-day bowler and a fine gully fielder. He was also a useful lower-order batsman who was a regular night-watchman. In this role he played probably his finest innings, of 62, against a Derbyshire attack including Devon Malcolm and Phillip DeFreitas. A partnership of 204 for the third wicket with Jonathan Lewis was instrumental in securing victory.

He now works as a secondary school history teacher.
