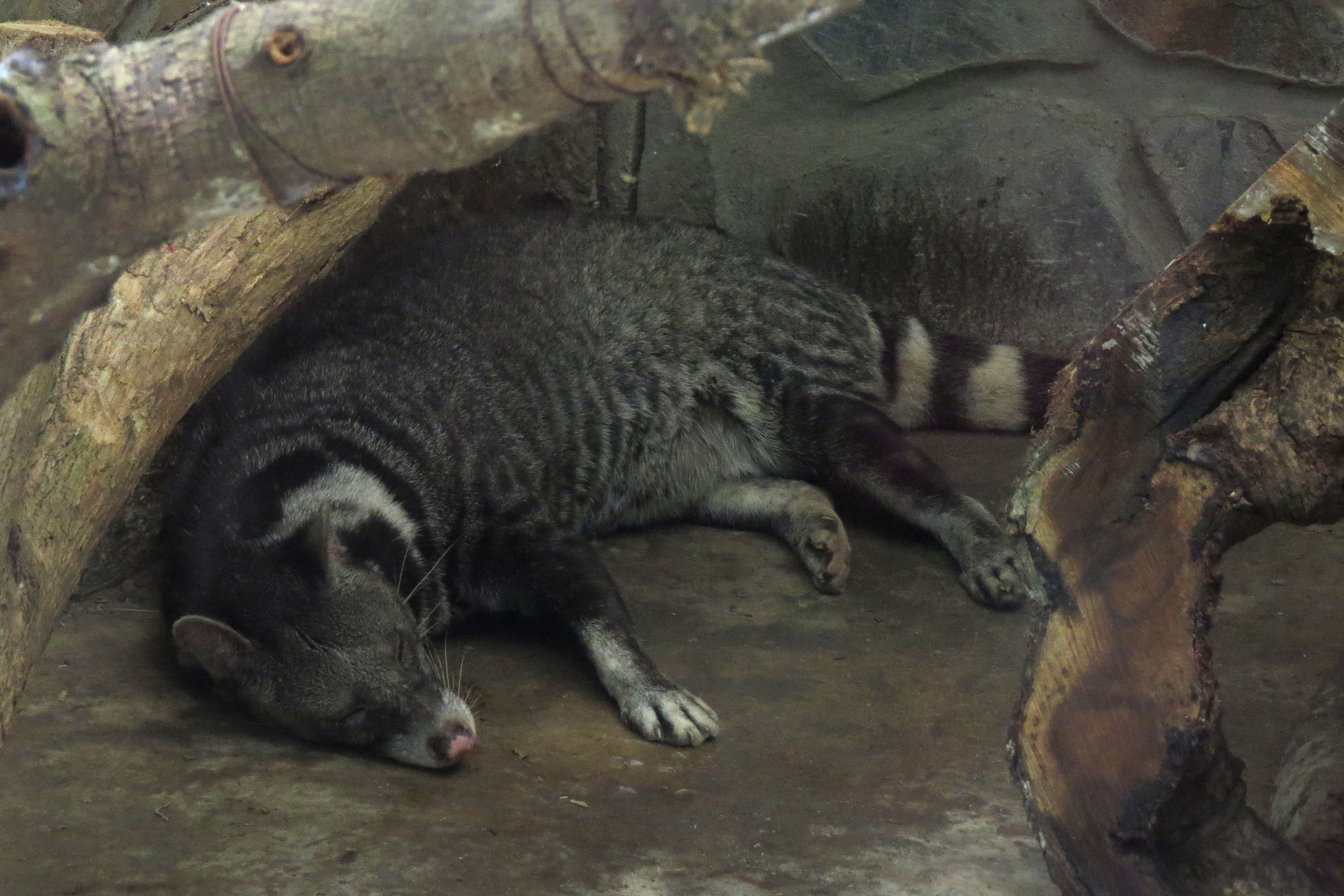

Conservation status
- Endangered (IUCN 3.1)

Scientific classification
- Kingdom: Animalia
- Phylum: Chordata
- Class: Mammalia
- Order: Carnivora
- Family: Viverridae
- Genus: Viverra
- Species: V. megaspila

Binomial name
- Viverra megaspila Blyth, 1862
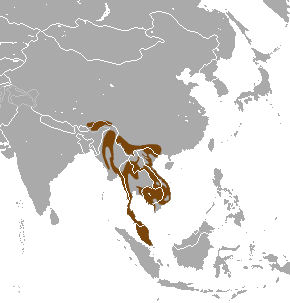
- Large-spotted civet range

= Large-spotted civet =

Species of carnivore

The large-spotted civet (Viverra megaspila) is a species of viverrid native to Southeast Asia. It is listed as Endangered on the IUCN Red List.

== Characteristics ==
Pocock described the large-spotted civet as varying in colour from silvery-grey to golden-buff or tawny with a black to brown pattern and large or comparatively small spots, which are separated or sometimes fusing into blotches or into vertical stripes behind the shoulders. White bands on the tail are mostly restricted to the sides and lower surface but very seldom form complete rings. Adults measure 30–30.5 in (76–77 cm) in head and body with a 13–15.5 in (33–39 cm) long tail. Its weight ranges from 6.6–8.4 kg (14.5–18.5 lb).

== Distribution and habitat ==
The large-spotted civet occurs in Myanmar, Thailand, Malaysia, Cambodia, Laos, Vietnam and southern China. In China, it was last sighted in 1998. It inhabits evergreen, deciduous, and dry dipterocarp forests below elevations of 300 m (980 ft). In Thailand, it occurs in several protected areas as far south as Ranong Province.

== Ecology and behaviour ==
Data on feeding ecology and behaviour of large-spotted civet do not exist.

== Threats ==
The large-spotted civet is threatened due to habitat degradation, habitat loss, and hunting with snares and dogs. The population is thought to have been steadily declining throughout the range countries, and in China and Vietnam in particular may have been reduced significantly. In Chinese and Vietnamese markets, it is in demand as food.

== Taxonomic history ==
Pocock considered V. megaspila and V. civettina to be distinct species. Ellerman and Morrison-Scott considered V. civettina a subspecies of V. megaspila.
