= Terence Morrison-Scott =

British zoologist (1908–1991)

Sir Terence Charles Stuart Morrison-Scott DSC FMA (24 October 1908 – 25 November 1991) was a British zoologist who was Director of the Science Museum and the British Museum (Natural History) in London, England.

Morrison-Scott was born in Paris and educated at Eton College, Christ Church, Oxford, and the Royal College of Science. He rowed at Eton and Oxford, winning the Silver Sculls at Oxford. He graduated from the RCS in 1935 with a first class degree and then worked briefly as an assistant master at Eton (1935–36).

Morrison-Scott was appointed as an Assistant Keeper (2nd class) in Department of Zoology at the British Museum (Natural History) on 1 October 1936. During World War II, he was a member of the Royal Naval Volunteer Reserve and commanded a flotilla of tank landing craft during D-Day in Normandy, earning the Distinguished Service Cross (DSC). He was promoted to Assistant Keeper (1st class) in 1943. He became the Head of the Mammal Section in 1945 and Principal Scientific Officer in 1948. From 1956–1960, he was Director of the Science Museum. Then from 1960 he was Director of the British Museum (Natural History) until his retirement on 30 November 1968.

He was Honorary Treasurer of the Zoological Society of London (1950–76). He was a Trustee of the Imperial War Museum (1956–60), He was a governor of the Imperial College of Science and Technology (1956–72) and was elected a Fellow in 1963. He was a Council member of the National Trust (1968–83) and a member of the Standing Commission on Museums and Galleries (1973–76). He was a Fellow of the Museums Association and was knighted for his services.

== Marriage ==
Terence Morrison-Scott married Rita Layton in 1935. Lady Morrison-Scott died at age 103 in 2008.

== Publications ==
- Checklist of Palaearctic and Indian mammals 1758 to 1946 / by J.R. Ellerman and T.C.S. Morrison-Scott. London: BM (NH), 1951.
- Checklist of Palaearctic and Indian mammals 1758 to 1946 / by J.R. Ellerman and T.C.S. Morrison-Scott. London: BM (NH), 1966.
- A list of British mammals [by] T.C.S. Morrison-Scott Published London, Printed by order of the trustees of the British Museum, 1952.
- Southern African mammals, 1758–1951: a reclassification, by J. R. Ellerman, T. C. S. Morrison-Scott, and R. W. Hayman, 1909–1973 Published London: Printed by order of the trustees of the British Museum, 1953.

Cultural offices
Preceded by Dr F. Sherwood Taylor	Director of the Science Museum; 1956–1960	Succeeded by Sir David Follett
Preceded by ?	Director of the British Museum of Natural History; 1960–1968	Succeeded by ?
