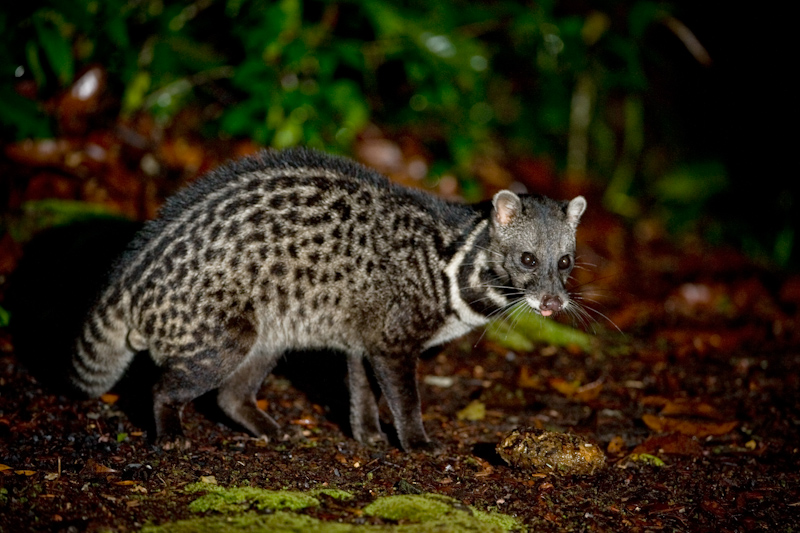

Conservation status
- Least Concern (IUCN 3.1)

Scientific classification
- Kingdom: Animalia
- Phylum: Chordata
- Class: Mammalia
- Order: Carnivora
- Family: Viverridae
- Genus: Viverra
- Species: V. tangalunga

Binomial name
- Viverra tangalunga Gray, 1832
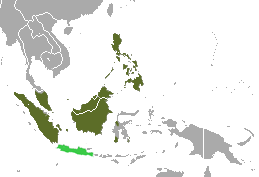
- Malayan civet range (dark green - extant, light green - probably extant)

= Malayan civet =

Species of carnivore

The Malayan civet (Viverra tangalunga), also known as the Malay civet and Oriental civet, is a viverrid native to the Malay Peninsula and the islands of Sumatra, Bangka, Borneo, the Riau Archipelago, and the Philippines. It is listed as "Least Concern" by IUCN as it is a relatively widely distributed, appears to be tolerant of degraded habitats, and occurs in a number of protected areas.

== Taxonomy ==
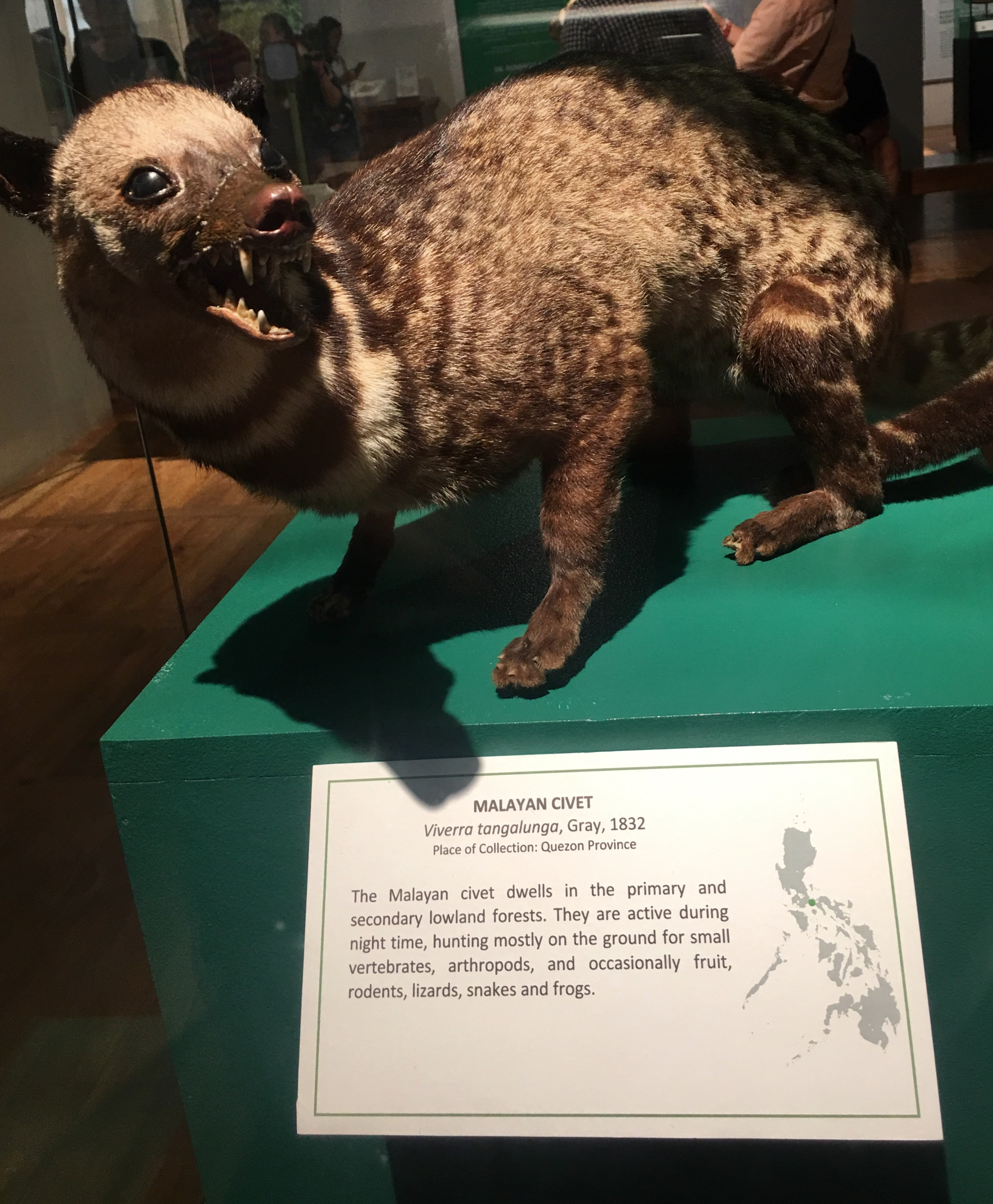
Taxidermied Malayan civet at Philippine National Museum

Viverra tangalunga was the scientific name proposed by John Edward Gray in 1832 for a spotted zoological specimen.

== Characteristics ==
The Malay civet's tail is black above and ringed on the lower side.

== Distribution and habitat ==
The historical range of the Malay civet includes Indonesia, Malaysia, Brunei, the Philippines and Singapore. In Malaysia, it occurs in Borneo, Banggi Island, Langkawi Island, Penang Island and in Peninsular Malaysia. It also occurs in Sumatra. It was introduced to Sulawesi and the Maluku Islands. Museum records indicate that the Malay civet also occurred on the Indonesian islands of Java, Bawal and Telok Pai, and on the Philippine island Leyte. In 2012, an individual was photographed in Singapore. The Malay civet population in the Philippines may have originated in Borneo and colonized Palawan island naturally. It possibly later dispersed to the rest of Philippines through human introduction, because land connection between Philippines islands did not exist during last glacial period.

The Malay civet inhabits a wide variety of habitats including forests, secondary habitats, cultivated land and the outskirts of villages.

== Ecology and behaviour ==
Malay civets are solitary, omnivorous, and primarily terrestrial.

Densities of Malay civets are higher in unlogged than in a logged forests. Fruit comprises a larger proportion of diet in unlogged forest compared to logged forest. With fruit contributing a larger percentage of the diet in unlogged forests, logging may lead to increased competition by other frugivores such as palm civets which may exploit fruit directly on trees unlike the mainly terrestrial Malay civet. Around the Malaysian Bera Lake Malay civets were found in logged forest. Arboreal, frugivorous civets are little affected by logging, whereas terrestrial, carnivorous or insectivorous species might be negatively impacted by logging.

== Threats ==
As a ground-living species it is exposed to snaring and other forms of ground-level trapping, and hunting with dogs. The limited survey in areas heavily used by people suggests it is rather well able to persist at general levels of threat. The species is occasionally hunted for food and treated as a pest as it raids poultry.

In Borneo, the Malayan civet is negatively affected by the effects of timber harvesting.

== Conservation ==
Viverra tangalunga is protected in Malaysia under the Wildlife Protection Act (WPA) of 1972. However, in many rural areas of Peninsular Malaysia civets are considered a pest because they prey on small livestock and raid fruit orchards. Section 55 of the WPA of 1972 allows farmers to shoot any wild animal that causes damage to their property, as long as reasonable efforts have been made to frighten the animal away.
