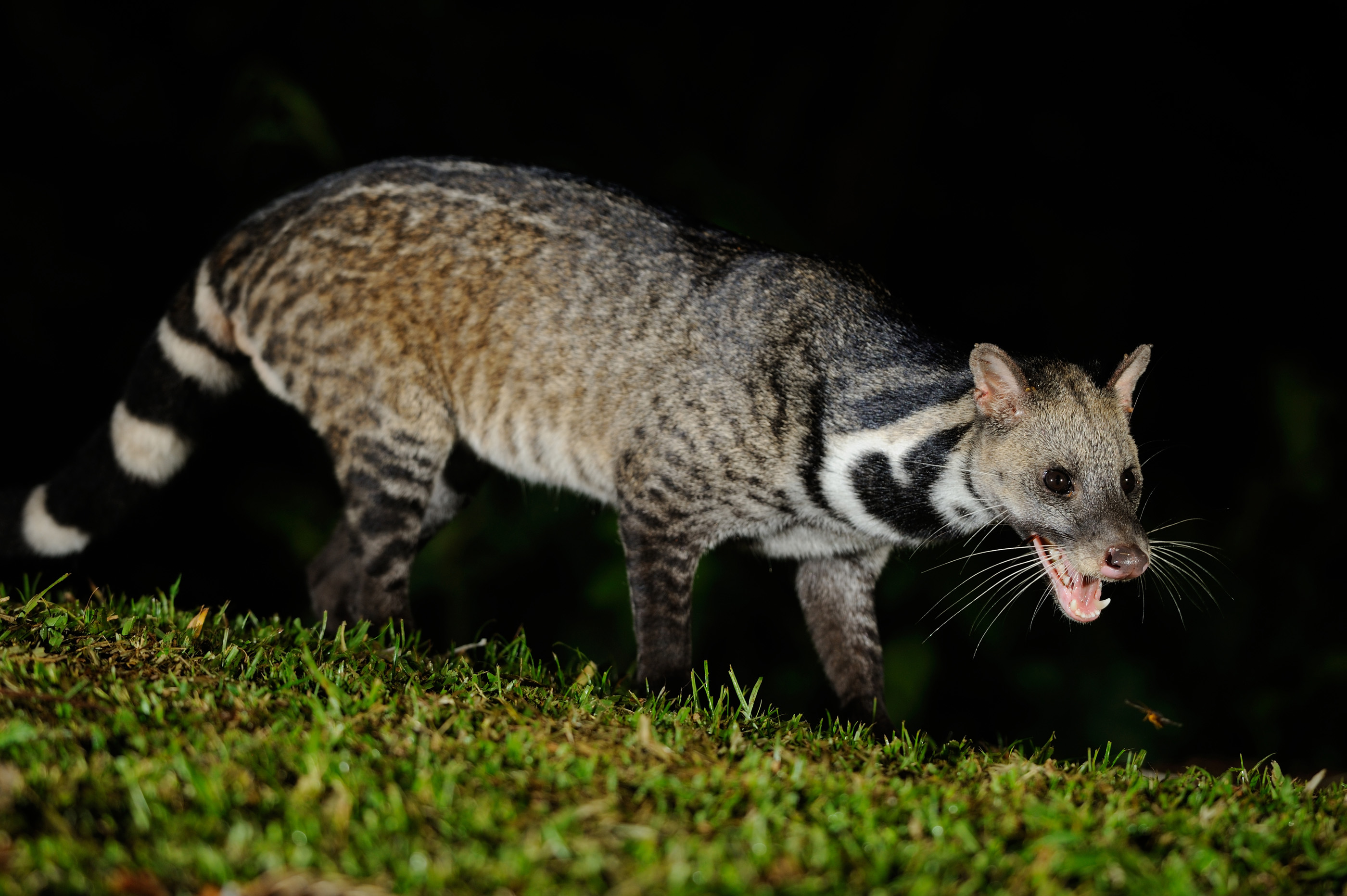

Conservation status
- Least Concern (IUCN 3.1)
- CITES Appendix III

Scientific classification
- Kingdom: Animalia
- Phylum: Chordata
- Class: Mammalia
- Order: Carnivora
- Family: Viverridae
- Genus: Viverra
- Species: V. zibetha

Binomial name
- Viverra zibetha Linnaeus, 1758
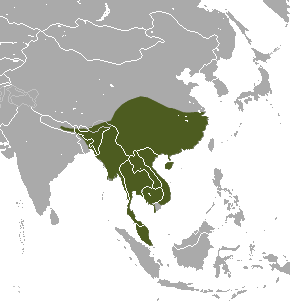
- Large Indian civet range

= Large Indian civet =

Species of carnivore

The large Indian civet (Viverra zibetha) is a viverrid native to South and Southeast Asia. It is listed as least concern on the IUCN Red List. The global population is thought to be decreasing due to hunting and trapping driven by the demand for bushmeat.

== Characteristics ==
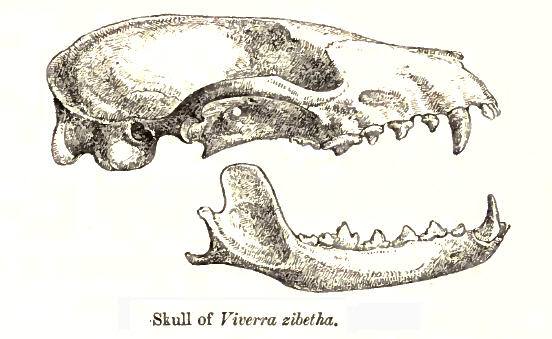
Skull

The large Indian civet is grey or tawny and has a black spinal stripe running from behind the shoulders to the root of the tail. The front of the muzzle has a whitish patch emphasized by blackish behind on each side. The chin and fore throat are blackish. The sides and lower surface of the neck are banded with black stripes and white spaces in between. The tail has a variable number of complete black and white rings. Its claws are retractable. The soles of the feet are hairy.

As indicated by its common name, this is a relatively large civet, almost certainly the largest of the Viverra species and exceeded in size among the Viverridae family only by African civets and binturongs. Its head-and-body length ranges from 50–95 cm (20–37 in) with a 38–59 cm (15–23 in) long tail. The hind foot measures 9–14.5 cm (3.5–5.7 in). Its weight ranges from 3.4–9.2 kg (7.5–20.3 lb). Some sources claim the species can weigh up to 11 kg (24 lb) (though possibly attained in captivity).

== Distribution and habitat ==
The large Indian civet ranges from Nepal, northeast India, Bhutan, Bangladesh to Myanmar, Thailand, the Malay Peninsula and Singapore to Cambodia, Laos, Vietnam and China.

In Nepal, the large Indian civet was recorded up to 2,250 m (7,380 ft) in the Himalayas.

In China, the wild large Indian civet population declined drastically by 94–99% since the 1950s following deforestation, due to hunting for the fur trade, use of its musk glands as medicine and for the perfume industry. By the 1990s, it was largely confined to the north of Guangdong Province in southern China, but has not been recorded in Hainan Island during surveys between 1998 and 2008.

== Ecology and behaviour ==
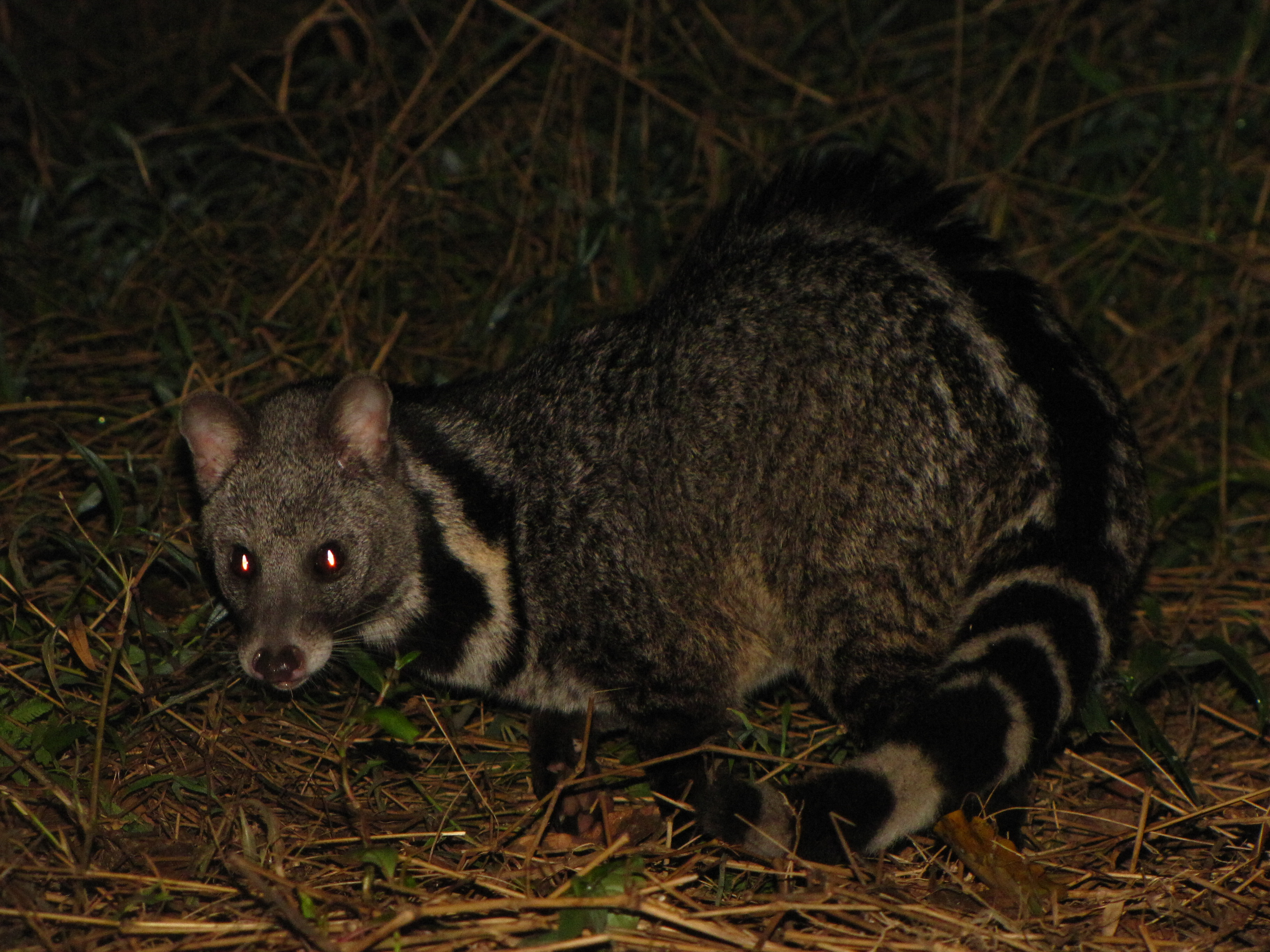
Large Indian civet in Namdapha National Park, India

The large Indian civet is solitary and nocturnal. It spends most of the time on the ground. It is an opportunistic hunter that preys on a wide variety of small animals.

Radio-tracked large Indian civets in Thailand had home ranges of 2.7 to 8.8 km^{2} (1.0 to 3.4 sq mi).

== Conservation ==
Viverra zibetha is a protected species in Hong Kong under the Wild Animals Protection Ordinance Cap 170, though it has not been recorded in a natural state in Hong Kong since the 1970s, and is considered extirpated.

== Taxonomy ==
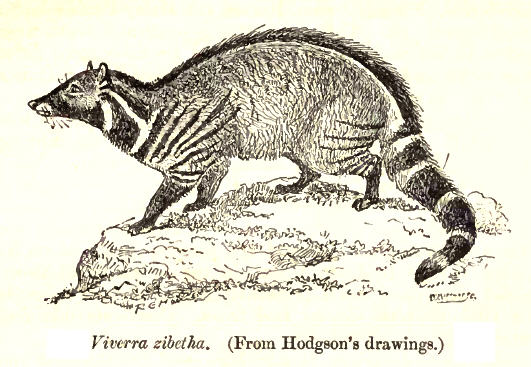
Large Indian civet, a drawing by Brian Houghton Hodgson

Viverra zibetha was the scientific name for the large Indian civet introduced by Carl Linnaeus in 1758. Several naturalists proposed species and subspecies in the 19th and 20th centuries, of which the following were recognised as valid subspecies by 2005:

- V. z. zibetha is the nominate subspecies and occurs in Nepal and Northeast India.
- Viverra ashtoni described by Robert Swinhoe in 1864 was a skin of an individual that was shot near the upper Min River in China's Fujian Province; occurs in China.
- V. z. picta described by Robert Charles Wroughton in 1915 was based on two skins from the vicinity of Hkamti by the upper Chindwin River in Myanmar; occurs from Assam and northern Myanmar to Indochina.
- V. z. pruinosa also described by Wroughton in 1915 was a skin of an adult male large Indian civet from Myanmar's Tanintharyi Region; occurs from southern Myanmar to Peninsular Malaysia.
- V. z. hainana described by Ying-Xiang Wang and Xu in 1983 from Hainan Island.
