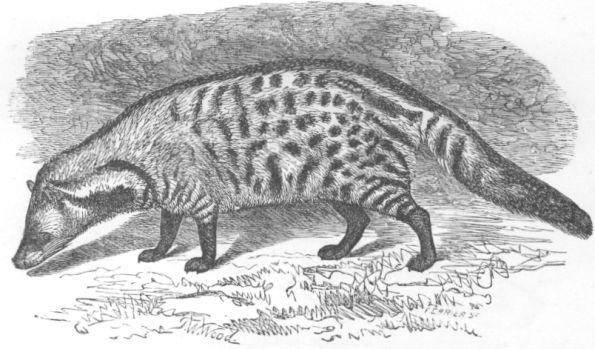
- Illustration of Large Indian civet (Viverra zibetha)

Scientific classification
- Kingdom: Animalia
- Phylum: Chordata
- Class: Mammalia
- Order: Carnivora
- Family: Viverridae
- Subfamily: Viverrinae
- Genus: Viverra; Linnaeus, 1758

Type species
- Viverra zibetha Linnaeus, 1758

Species
- see text
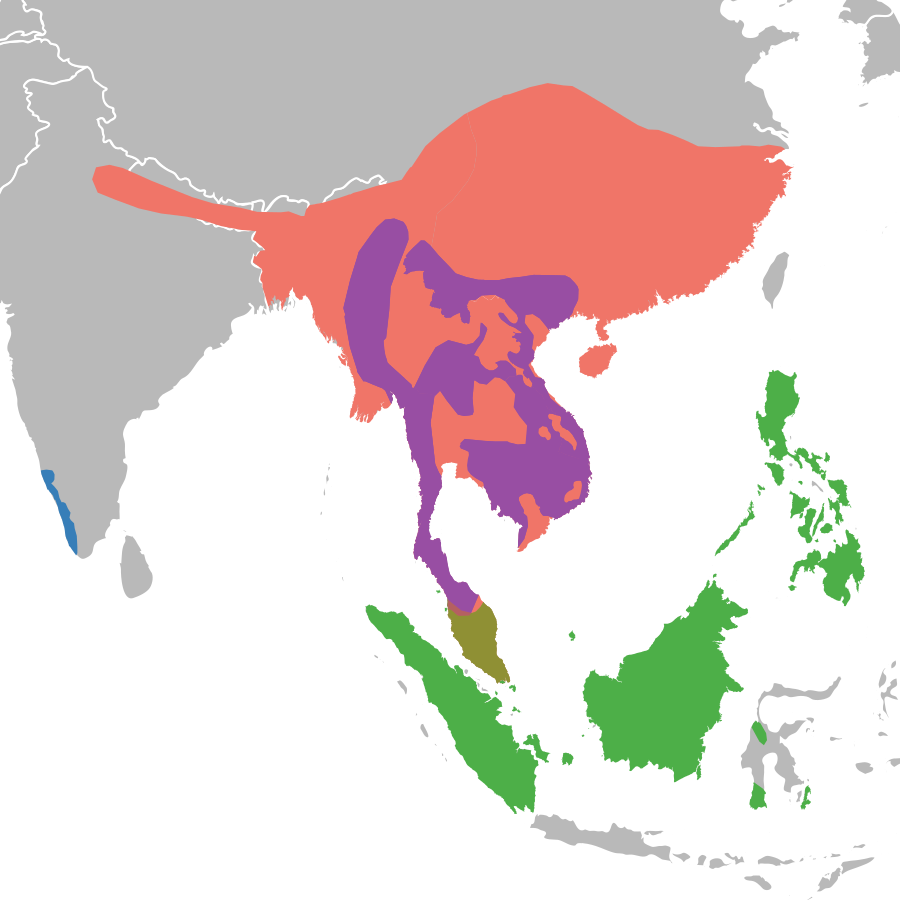
- Viverra distribution V. zibetha in red, V. tangalunga in green, V. civettina in blue, V. megaspila in purple

= Viverra =

Viverra Temporal range: Miocene–Present

Genus of carnivores

Viverra is a mammalian genus that was first named and described by Carl Linnaeus in 1758 as comprising several species including the large Indian civet (V. zibetha). The genus was subordinated to the viverrid family by John Edward Gray in 1821.

== Characteristics ==
Viverra species are distinguished externally from the other genera of the Viverrinae by the structure of the fore feet: the third and fourth digits have lobes of skin, which act as protective sheaths for the retractile claws. The pads of the feet are surrounded by hair. They have a long and narrow skull, with narrow, nearly parallel-sided, not strongly constricted waist. Their postorbital processes are small and a little in front of the middle point between the tip of the premaxillae in front and of the occipital crest behind. The sagittal crest is moderately strong in adults. The sub-orbital portion of the cheek is comparatively short. The suture between the anterior bone of the zygomatic arch and the maxilla is much shorter than the median length of the nasals, than half the length of the cheek-teeth, and than the width across the occipital condyles. This width exceeds the length of the compound auditory bulla.

== Living species ==
Genus Viverra
Species	Image	IUCN Red List status and distribution
Large Indian civet (V. zibetha) Linnaeus, 1758		LC
Malayan civet (V. tangalunga) Gray, 1832		LC
Large-spotted civet (V. megaspila) Blyth, 1862		EN
Malabar large-spotted civet (V. civettina) Blyth, 1862		CR
