= Science Museum, London =

Museum in Kensington, London

Science Museum

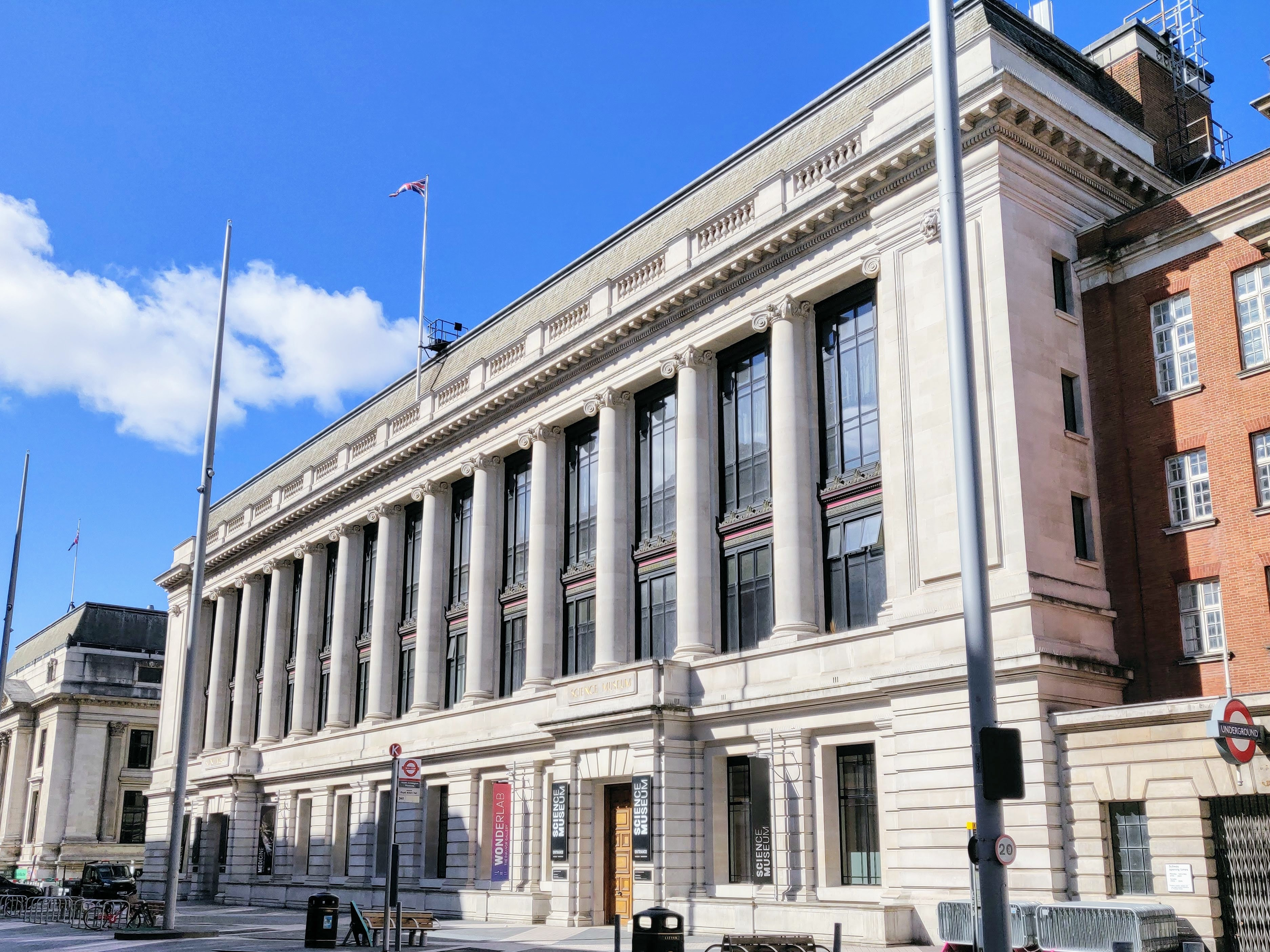
- The Science Museum

- Location within central London
- Established: 1857; 169 years ago; (separate status formalised 1909)
- Location: Exhibition Road, Kensington & Chelsea London, SW7 2DD; United Kingdom
- Coordinates: 51°29′51″N 0°10′29″W
- Visitors: 2,817,852 (2025)
- Director: Ian Blatchford
- Public transit access: South Kensington; Kensington Museums 360; Victoria & Albert Museum 14, 74, C1
- Website: www.sciencemuseum.org.uk

Science Museum Group
- National Railway Museum; Locomotion Museum; Science & Media; Science & Industry; Science Museum; Dana Research Centre and Library; National Collections Centre

The Science Museum is a major museum on Exhibition Road in South Kensington, London. It was founded in 1857 and is one of the city's major tourist attractions, attracting 2,817,852 visitors in 2025.

Like other publicly funded national museums in the United Kingdom, the Science Museum does not charge visitors for admission, although visitors are requested to make a donation if they are able. Temporary exhibitions may incur an admission fee.

It is one of the five museums in the Science Museum Group. The group changed its name from the National Museum of Science and Industry to Science Museum Group in 2012.

== Founding and history ==
The museum was founded in 1857 under Bennet Woodcroft from the collection of the Royal Society of Arts and surplus items from the Great Exhibition as part of the South Kensington Museum, together with what is now the Victoria and Albert Museum. It included a collection of machinery which became the Museum of Patents in 1858, and the Patent Office Museum in 1863. This collection contained many of the most famous exhibits of what is now the Science Museum.

In 1883, the contents of the Patent Office Museum were transferred to the South Kensington Museum. In 1885, the Science Collections were renamed the Science Museum and in 1893 a separate director was appointed. The Art Collections were renamed the Art Museum, which eventually became the Victoria and Albert Museum.

When Queen Victoria laid the foundation stone for the new building for the Art Museum, she stipulated that the museum be renamed after herself and her late husband. This was initially applied to the whole museum, but when that new building finally opened ten years later, the title was confined to the Art Collections and the Science Collections had to be divorced from it. On 26 June 1909 the Science Museum, as an independent entity, came into existence.

The Science Museum's present quarters, designed by Sir Richard Allison, were opened to the public in stages over the period 1919–28. This building was known as the East Block, construction of which began in 1913 and was temporarily halted by World War I. As the name suggests it was intended to be the first building of a much larger project, which was never realized. However, the museum buildings were expanded over the following years; a pioneering Children's Gallery with interactive exhibits opened in 1931, the Centre Block was completed in 1961–3, the infill of the East Block and the construction of the Lower & Upper Wellcome Galleries in 1980, and the construction of the Wellcome Wing in 2000 result in the museum now extending to Queen's Gate.

Until 1984 the Science Museum (and also the Victoria and Albert Museum) were part of the Civil Service. During the twentieth century it lay within the Board of Education, then the Ministry of Education and finally the Department of Education and Science. The National Heritage Act 1983 created a Board of Trustees and vested the collections (which had formerly been vested in the relevant Minister) in the Board. Today it receives funding from the Department for Culture, Media and Sport, to which the Director is accountable.

=== Centennial volume: Science for the Nation ===
The leading academic publisher, Palgrave Macmillan, published the official centenary history of the Science Museum on 14 April 2010. The first complete history since 1957, Science for the Nation: Perspectives on the History of the Science Museum is a series of individual views by Science Museum staff and external academic historians of different aspects of the Science Museum's history. While it is not a chronological history in the conventional sense, the first five chapters cover the history of the museum from the Brompton Boilers in the 1860s to the opening of the Wellcome Wing in 2000. The remaining eight chapters cover a variety of themes concerning the museum's development.

== Galleries ==
The Science Museum consists of two buildings – the main building and the Wellcome Wing. Visitors enter the main building from Exhibition Road, while the Wellcome Wing is accessed by walking through the Energy Hall, Exploring Space and then the Making the Modern World galleries (see below) at ground floor level.

=== Main building – Level 0 ===
==== The Energy Hall ====
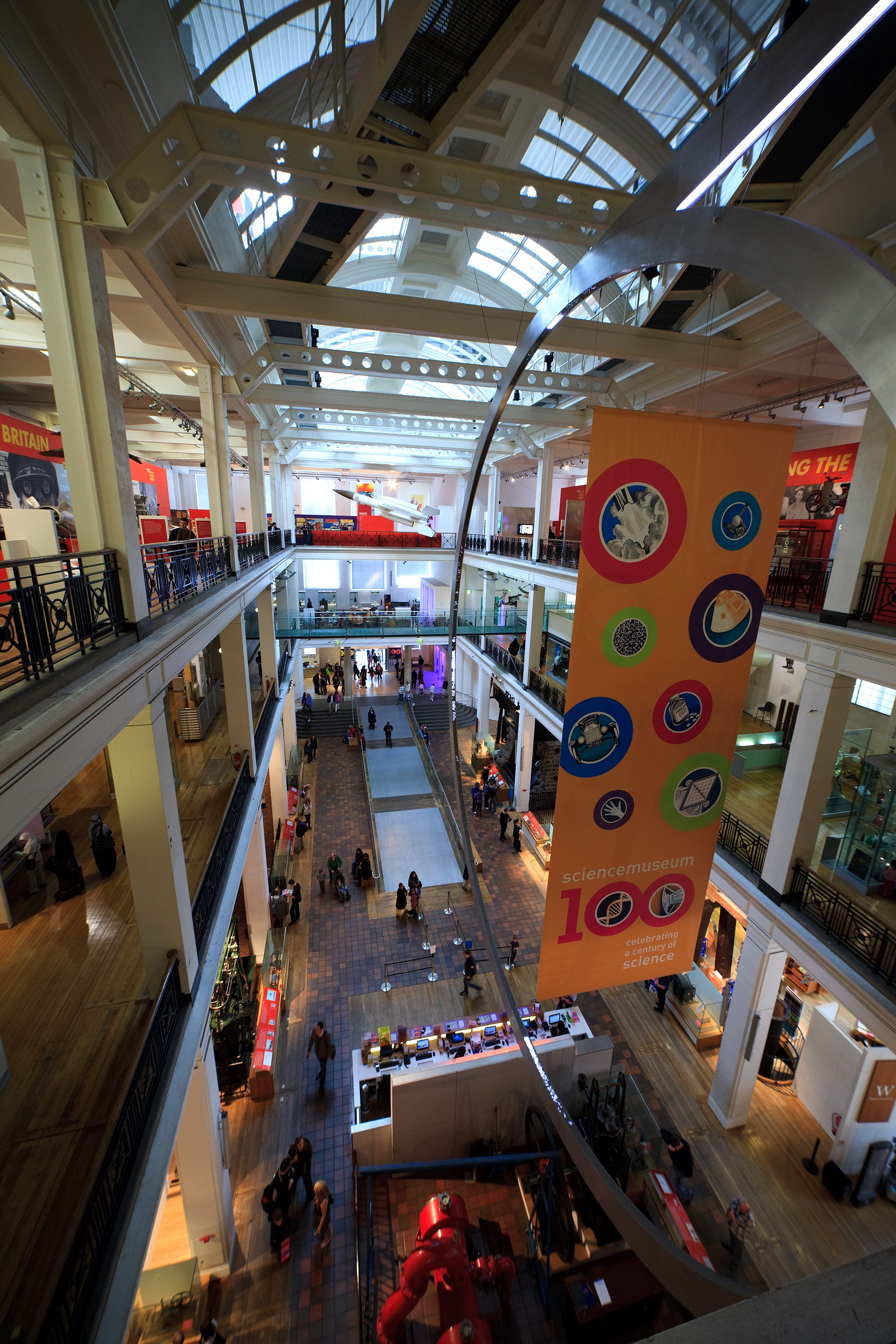
The Energy Hall

The Energy Hall is the first area that most visitors see as they enter the building. On the ground floor, the gallery contains a variety of steam engines, including the oldest surviving James Watt beam engine, which together tell the story of the British Industrial Revolution.

Also on display is a recreation of James Watt's garret workshop from his home, Heathfield Hall, using over 8,300 objects removed from the room, which was sealed after his 1819 death, when the hall was demolished in 1927.

==== Exploring Space ====
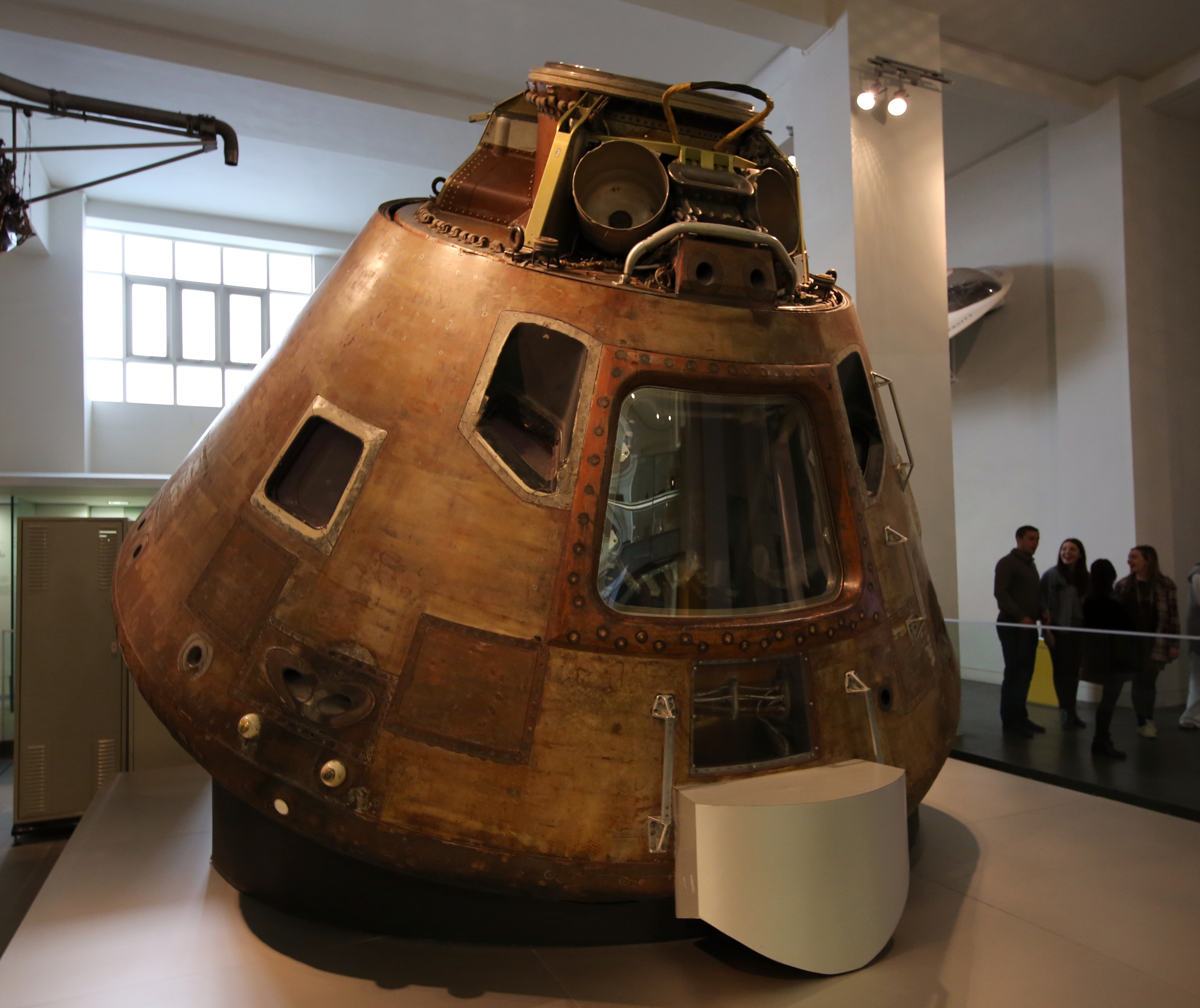
The Apollo 10 Command Module

Exploring Space is a historical gallery, filled with rockets and exhibits that tell the story of human space exploration and the benefits that space exploration has brought us (particularly in the world of telecommunications). Its principle exhibit is The Apollo 10 Command Module Charlie Brown, which orbited the Moon 31 times in 1969.

==== Making the Modern World ====
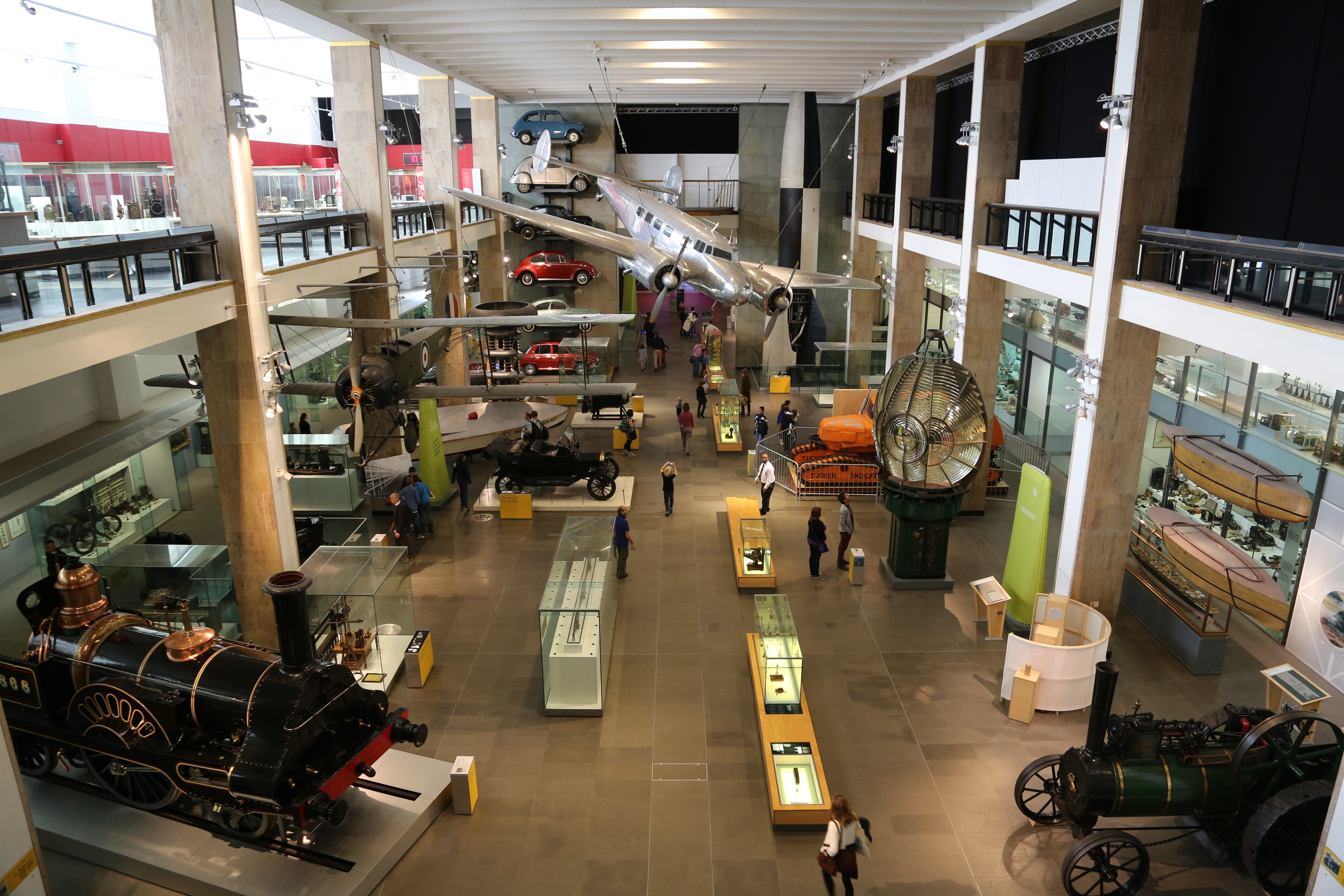
Making the Modern World gallery from above

Making the Modern World displays some of the museum's most remarkable objects, including Puffing Billy (the oldest surviving steam locomotive), Crick's double helix, and the command module from the Apollo 10 mission, which are displayed along a timeline chronicling man's technological achievements.

A V-2 rocket, designed by German rocket scientist Wernher von Braun, is displayed in this gallery. Doug Millard, space historian and curator of space technology at the museum, states: "We got to the Moon using V-2 technology but this was technology that was developed with massive resources, including some particularly grim ones. The V-2 programme was hugely expensive in terms of lives, with the Nazis using slave labour to manufacture these rockets".

Stephenson's Rocket used to be displayed in this gallery. After a short UK tour, since 2019 Rocket is on permanent display at the National Railway Museum in York, in the Art Gallery.

=== Main Building – Level 1 ===
==== Medicine: The Wellcome Galleries ====
The Medicine: The Wellcome Galleries is a five-gallery medical exhibition which spans ancient history to modern times with over 3000 exhibits and specially commissioned artworks. Many of the objects on display come from the Wellcome Collection started by Henry Wellcome. One of the commissioned artworks is a large bronze sculpture of Rick Genest titled Self-Conscious Gene by Marc Quinn. The galleries occupy the museum's entire first floor and opened on 16 November 2019.

=== Main Building – Level 2 ===
==== The Clockmakers Museum ====
The Clockmakers Museum is the world's oldest clock and watch museum which was originally assembled by the Worshipful Company of Clockmakers in London's Guildhall.

==== Science City 1550–1800: The Linbury Gallery ====
The Science City 1550–1800: The Linbury Gallery shows how London grew to be a global hub for trade, commerce and scientific enquiry.

==== Mathematics: The Winton Gallery ====
The Mathematics: The Winton Gallery examines the role that mathematicians have had in building our modern world. In the landing area to access the gallery (stair C) is a working example of Charles Babbage's Difference engine No.2. This was built by the Science Museum and its main part completed in 1991, to celebrate 200 years since Babbage's birth, and was designed by Zaha Hadid Architects.

==== Information Age ====
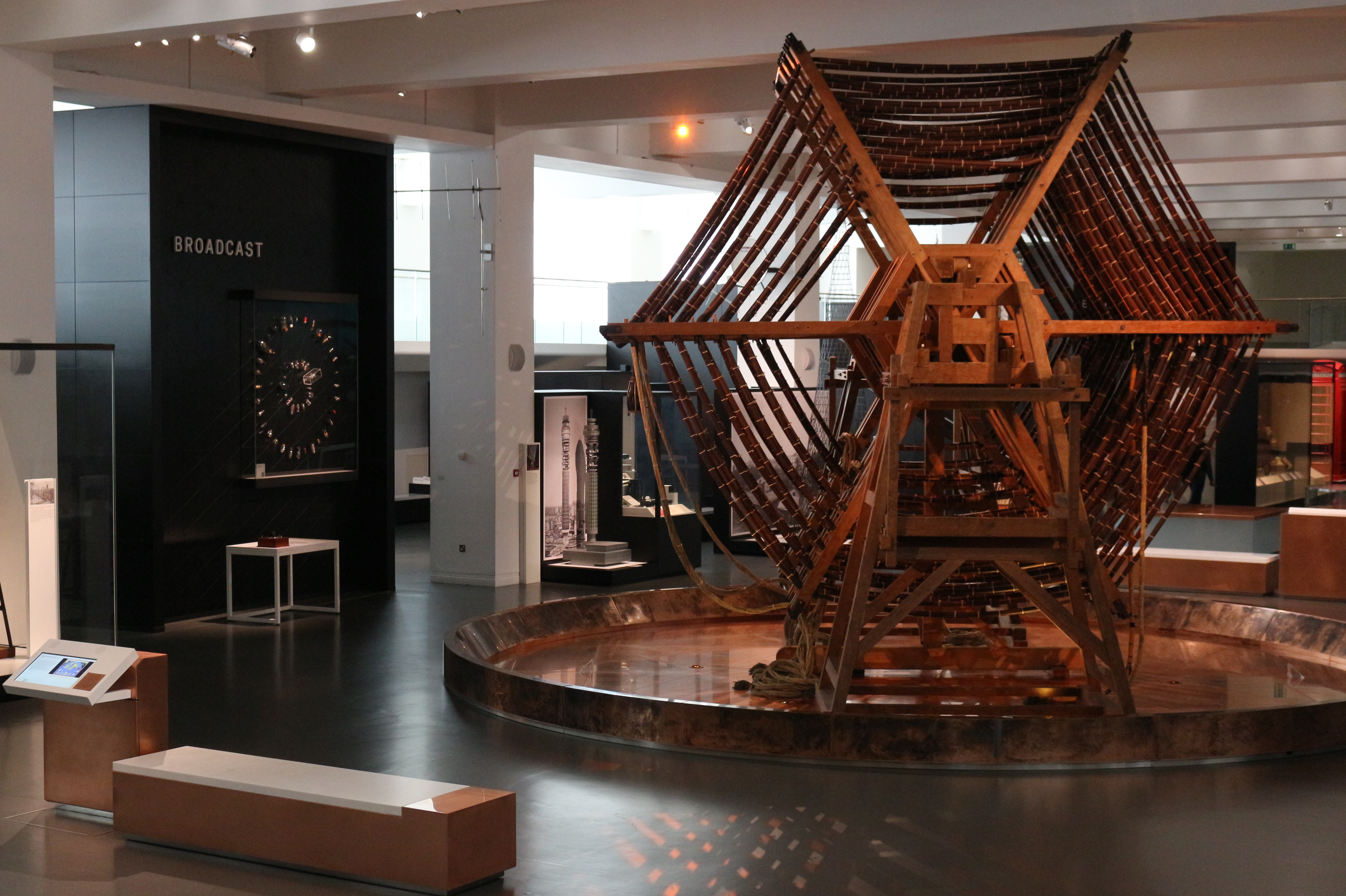
Information Age Gallery at the Science Museum London

The Information Age gallery has exhibits covering the development of communications and computing over the last two centuries. It explores the six networks that have transformed global communications: The Cable, The Telephone Exchange, Broadcast, The Constellation, The Cell and The Web It was opened on 24 October 2014 by the Queen, Elizabeth II, who sent her first tweet from here.

=== Main Building – Level 3 ===
==== Wonderlab: The Equinor Gallery ====
One of the most popular galleries in the museum is the interactive Wonderlab:The Equinor Gallery, formerly called Launchpad. The gallery is staffed by Explainers who demonstrate how exhibits work, conduct live experiments and perform shows to schools and the visiting public.

==== Flight ====
The Flight gallery charts the development of flight in the 20th century. Contained in the gallery are several full sized aeroplanes and helicopters, including Alcock and Brown's transatlantic Vickers Vimy (1919), Spitfire and Hurricane fighters, as well as numerous aero-engines and a cross-section of a Boeing 747. It opened in 1963 and was refurbished in the 1990s.

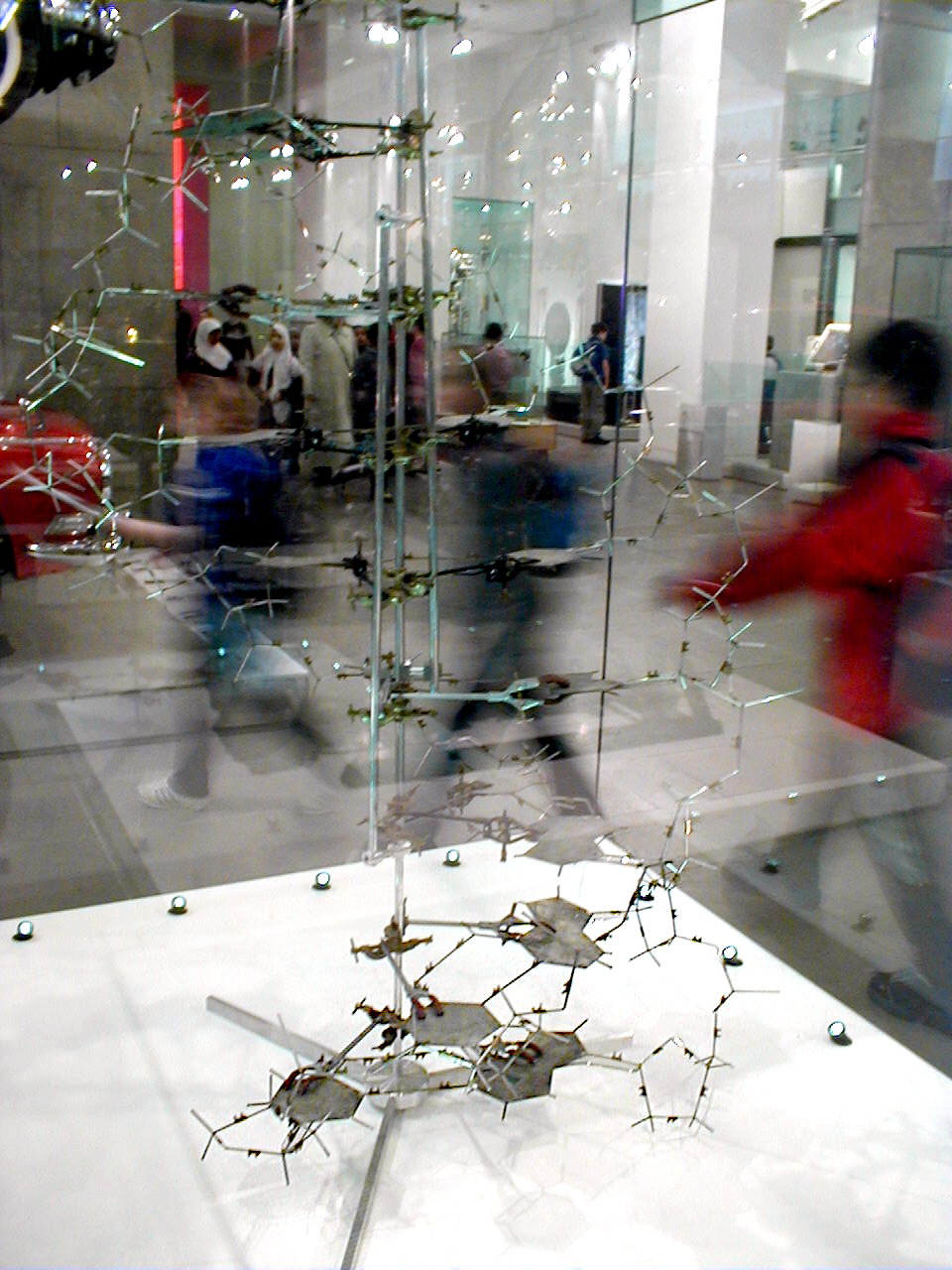
Replica of the DNA model built by Crick and Watson in 1953

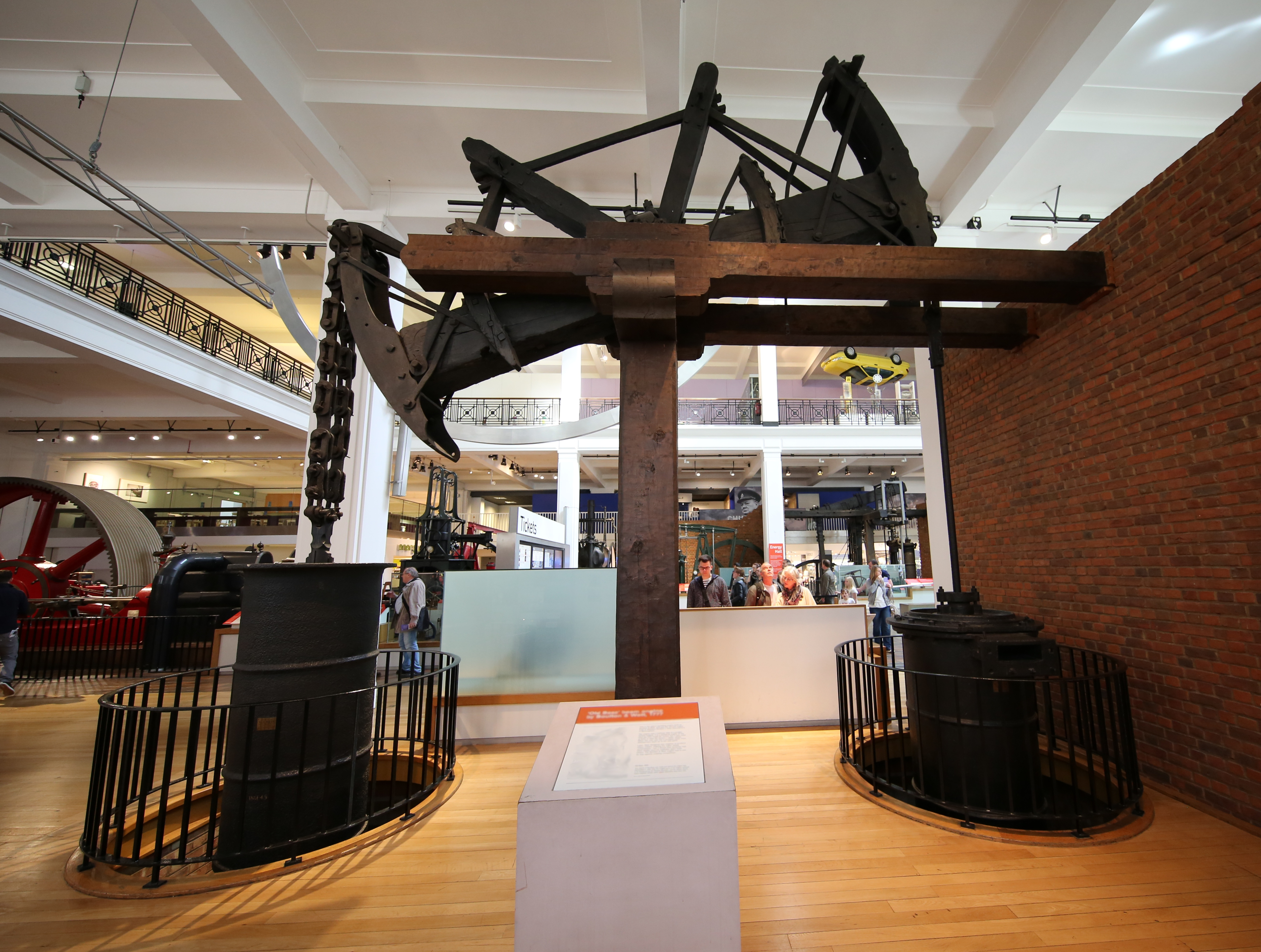
Old Bess, a surviving example of a steam engine made by James Watt, in 1777

=== Wellcome Wing ===
==== Power Up (Level 1) ====
Power Up is an interactive gaming gallery showcasing the history of video games and consoles from the past 50 years. Visitors can play on over 150 consoles, featuring consoles from the Binatone TV Master to the Play Station 5.

==== Tomorrow's World (Level 0) ====
The Tomorrow's World gallery hosts topical science stories and free exhibitions including:

- Mission to Mercury: Bepi Columbo
- Driverless: Who's in control? (exhibition ended January 2021)

==== IMAX: The Ronson Theatre (Entrance from Level 0) ====
The IMAX: The Ronson Theatre is an IMAX cinema which shows educational films (most in 3-D), as well as blockbusters and live events. It features a screen measuring 24.3 by 16.8 metres, with both a dual IMAX with Laser projection system and a traditional IMAX 15/70mm film projector, and an IMAX 12-channel sound system.

==== Who Am I? (Level 1) ====
Visitors to the Who Am I? gallery can explore the science of who they are through intriguing objects, provocative artworks and hands-on exhibits.

==== Energy Revolution: The Adani Green Energy Gallery (Level 2) ====
Energy Revolution: The Adani Green Energy Gallery explores how the world can generate and use energy more sustainably to urgently reduce carbon dioxide emissions from global energy systems and limit the impact of climate change.

== Temporary and touring exhibitions ==
The museum has some dedicated spaces for temporary exhibitions (both free and paid-for) and displays, on Level -1 (Basement Gallery), Level 0 (inside the Exploring Space Gallery and Tomorrow's World), Level 1 (Special Exhibition Gallery 1) and Level 2 (Special Exhibition Gallery 2 and The Studio). Most of these travel to other Science Museum Group sites, as well as nationally and internationally.

Past exhibitions have included:

- Sustaining Beauty – 90 years of art in engineering, on the evolution of design and engineering behind Alfa Romeo's cars (2001–2002).
- Bond, James Bond, an interactive James Bond themed exhibition featuring a behind-the-scenes exploration of the production of the film franchise (2002–2003).
- The Lord of the Rings Motion Picture Trilogy – The Exhibition, an exhibition featuring props and costumes from Peter Jackson's The Lord of the Rings trilogy and focusing on the special effects used in the films (2003–2004).
- Future Face, on the science behind human faces and speculation about the future of cosmetic surgery and digitally enhanced faces (2004–2005).
- Pixar: 20 Years of Animation, an inside look at the art and technology behind American computer animation studio Pixar over the past 20 years (2006).
- The Science of Survival, an exhibition that allowed visitors to explore what the world might be like in 2050 and how humankind will meet the challenges of climate change and energy shortages (2008).
- Wallace and Gromit present A World of Cracking Ideas, a Wallace & Gromit themed exhibition designed to get children thinking about design and invention (2009).
- Codebreaker, on the life of Alan Turing (2012–2013).
- 3D: Printing the Future, an exhibition that featured 3D-printed models by Stratasys, and also showcased Pneuma2, a 3D-printed sculpture inspired by the human lung and designed by Israeli professor Neri Oxman (2013).
- Unlocking Lovelock, which explored the archive of James Lovelock (ended 2015).
- Cosmonauts: Birth of Space Age (ended 2016).
- Wounded – Conflict, Casualties and Care (2016–2018) – timed to commemorated the centenary of the Battle of the Somme; explored the development of medical treatment for wounded soldiers during the First World War.
- Robots (ended 2017).
- The Sun: Living with our Star (ended 2019).
- The Last Tsar: Blood and Revolution (ended 2019).
- Top Secret: From Cyphers to Cyber Security (ended 2020, closed at the Science and Industry Museum on 31 August 2021).
- Art of Innovation – from Enlightenment to Dark Matter (2019–2020) – explored the interaction between science, the arts and society; included artworks by Umberto Boccioni, John Constable, Barbara Hepworth, David Hockney, L.S. Lowry and J. M. W. Turner.
- Science Fiction: Voyage to the Edge of Imagination (2022–2023)
- The Science Box contemporary science series toured various venues in the UK and Europe in the 1990s and from 1995 The Science of Sport appeared in various incarnations and venues around the World. In 2005 The Science Museum teamed up with Fleming Media to set up The Science of... to develop and tour exhibitions including The Science of Aliens (based on the 2005 Channel 4 documentary series Alien Worlds), The Science of Spying and The Science of Survival.
- In 2014 the museum launched the family science Energy Show, which toured the country.
- The same year it began a new programme of touring exhibitions which opened with Collider: Step inside the world's greatest experiment to much critical acclaim. The exhibition takes visitors behind the scenes at CERN and explores the science and engineering behind the discovery of the Higgs Boson. The exhibition toured until early 2017.
- Media Space exhibitions also go on tour, notably Only in England which displays works by the photographers Tony Ray-Jones and Martin Parr.

== Events ==
=== Astronights for Children ===
The Science Museum organises Astronights, "all-night extravaganza with a scientific twist". Up to 380 children aged between 7 and 11, accompanied by adults, are invited to spend an evening performing fun "science based" activities and then spend the night sleeping in the museum galleries amongst the exhibits. In the morning, they're woken to breakfast and more science, watching a show before the end of the event.

=== 'Lates' for Adults ===
On the evening of the last Wednesday of every month (except December) the museum organises an adults only evening with up to 30 events, from lectures to silent discos. Previous Lates have seen conversations with the actress activist Lily Cole and Biorevolutions with the Francis Crick Institute which attracted around 7000 people, mostly under the age of 35.

=== Cancellation of James D. Watson talk ===
In October 2007, the Science Museum cancelled a talk by the co-discoverer of the structure of DNA, James D. Watson, because he claimed that IQ test results showed black people to have lower intelligence than white people. The decision was criticised by some scientists, including Richard Dawkins, but supported by other scientists, including Steven Rose.

== Former galleries ==
The museum has undergone many changes in its history with older galleries being replaced by new ones.

- The Children's Gallery – 1931–1995 Located in the basement, it was replaced by the under fives area called The Garden.
- Agriculture – 1951–2017 Located on the first floor, it looked at the history and future of farming in the 20th century. It featured model dioramas and object displays. It was replaced by Medicine: The Wellcome Galleries in 2019.
- Shipping – 1963–2012. Located on the second floor, its contents were 3D scanned and made available online. It was replaced by Information Age.

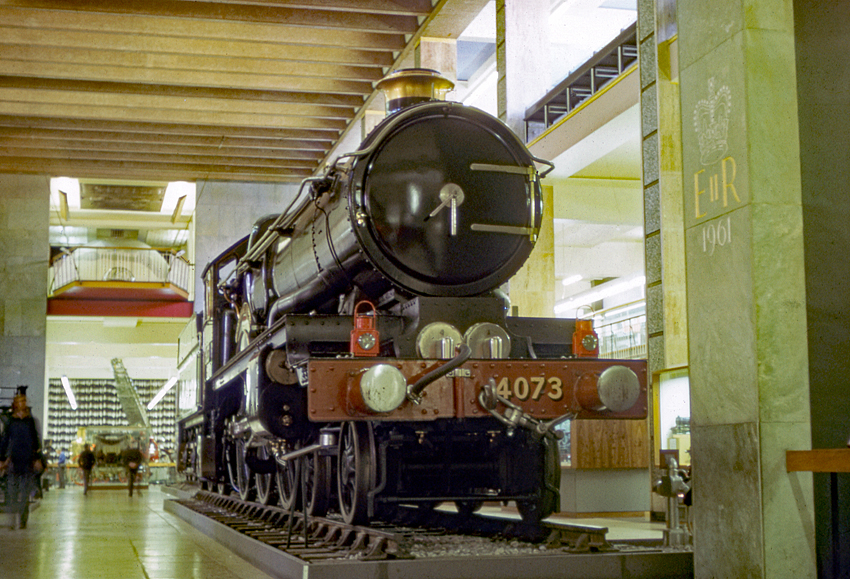
4073 Caerphilly Castle in the Land Transport gallery

- Land Transport – 1967–1996 Located on the ground floor, it displayed vehicles and objects associated with transport on land, including rail and road. It was replaced by the Making the Modern World gallery in 2000.
- Glimpses of Medical History – 1981–2015 Located on the fourth floor, it contained reconstructions and dioramas of the history of practised medicine. It was not replaced, but subsumed into Medicine: The Wellcome Galleries which opened on the museum's first floor in November 2019.
- Science and the Art of Medicine – 1981–2015 Located on the fifth floor, which featured exhibits of medical instruments and practices from ancient days and from many countries. It was not replaced, but subsumed into Medicine: The Wellcome Galleries which opened on the museum's first floor in November 2019.
- Launchpad – 1986–2015 Originally opening on the ground floor, in 1989 it moved to the first floor replacing Textiles. Then in 2000 to the basement of the newly built Wellcome Wing. In 2007, it moved to its final location on the third floor, replacing the George III gallery. It was replaced by Wonderlab in 2016.
- Challenge of Materials – 1997–2019 Located on the first floor, explored the diversity and properties of materials. It was designed by WilkinsonEyre and featured an exhibit Materials House by Thomas Heatherwick.
- Cosmos and Culture – 2009–2017 Located on the first floor, it featured astronomical objects showing the study of the night sky. It was replaced by Medicine: The Wellcome Galleries in 2019.
- Atmosphere – 2010–2022. The Atmosphere gallery explored the science of climate.
- Engineer your Future – 2014–2023. The Engineer your Future gallery explored whether you have the problem solving and team working skills to succeed in a career in engineering.
- The Secret Life of the Home – 1995–2024. The Secret Life of the Home showed the development of household appliances mostly from the late 19th and early 20th century, although some were earlier. This gallery closed permanently on 2 June 2024.

== Storage, library and archives ==
Blythe House, 1979–2019, the museum's former storage facility in West Kensington, while not a gallery, offered tours of the collections housed there. Objects formerly housed there are being transferred to the National Collections Centre, at the Science Museum Wroughton, in Wiltshire.

The Science Library was established in 1883 as part of the then South Kensington Museum. Under Samuel C. Bradford, who was librarian from 1930 to 1935, it was renamed "The Science Museum Library, the National Museum of Science and Technology". A 1936 report in Nature described it as "the finest science library in Great Britain" and noted that it held 252,515 volumes, received 9,468 current periodicals and had a subject index with 2,248,423 entries. Until the 1960s it was Britain's National Library for Science, Medicine and Technology. It holds runs of periodicals, early books and manuscripts, and is used by scholars worldwide. It was, for a number of years, run in conjunction with the library of Imperial College, but in 2007 the library was divided over two sites. Histories of science and biographies of scientists were kept at the Imperial College Library until February 2014 when the arrangement was terminated, the shelves were cleared and the books and journals shipped out, joining the rest of the collection, which includes original scientific works and archives, at the National Collections Centre.

Dana Research Centre and Library, in South Kensington near the museum, was previously an event space and cafe and reopened in its current form in 2015. Open to researchers and members of the public, it allows free access to almost 7,000 volumes, which can be consulted on site. Other material can be ordered from the National Collections Centre to be consulted at Dana.

== Sponsorship ==
The Science Museum has been sponsored by major organisations including Shell, BP, Samsung and GlaxoSmithKline. Some have been controversial. The museum declined to give details of how much it receives from oil and gas sponsors. Equinor is also the title sponsor of "Wonderlab: The Equinor Gallery", an exhibition for children, while BP is one of the funding partners of the museum's STEM Training Academy. Equinor's sponsorship of the Wonderlab exhibit was on the basis that the Science Museum would not make any statement to damage the oil firm's reputation.

Shell has influenced how the museum presents climate change in its programme sponsored by the oil company. The museum has signed a gagging clause in its agreement with Shell not to "make any statement or issue any publicity or otherwise be involved in any conduct or matter that may reasonably be foreseen as discrediting or damaging the goodwill or reputation" of Shell.

The museum signed a sponsorship contract with the Norwegian oil and gas company Equinor which contained a gagging clause, stating the museum would not say anything that could damage the fossil fuel company's reputation.

=== Reactions to sponsorship by fossil fuel companies ===
The museum's director, Ian Blatchford, defended the museum's sponsorship policy, saying: "Even if the Science Museum were lavishly publicly funded I would still want to have sponsorship from the oil companies."

Scientists for Global Responsibility called the museum's move "staggeringly out-of-step and irresponsible". Some presenters, including George Monbiot, pulled out of climate talks on finding they were sponsored by BP and the Norwegian oil company Equinor. Bob Ward of the Grantham Research Institute on Climate Change and the Environment said the "carbon capture exhibition is not 'greenwash'".

There have been protests against the sponsorship; in May 2021, a group calling themselves 'Scientists for XR' (Extinction Rebellion) locked themselves to a mechanical tree inside the museum. The UK Student Climate Network carried out an overnight occupation in June 2021, and were threatened with arrest. In August 2021, members of Extinction Rebellion held a protest inside and outside the museum with a 12 ft (3.7 m) pink dodo.

In 2021, Chris Rapley, a climate scientist, resigned from the museum's advisory board because of oil and gas company sponsorship.

In 2021, more than 40 senior academics and scientists said they would not work with the Science Museum due to its financial relationships with the fossil fuel industry.

In 2022, more than 400 teachers signed an open letter to the museum promising to boycott it following sponsorship of the museum's Energy Revolution exhibition by the coal mining company Adani.

== Directors of the Science Museum ==
The directors of the South Kensington Museum were:

- Henry Cole (1857–1873)
- Sir Philip Cunliffe-Owen (1873–1893)

The directors of the Science Museum have been:

- Major-General Edward R. Festing (1893–1904)
- William I. Last (1904–1911)
- Sir Francis Grant Ogilvie (1911–1920)
- Colonel Sir Henry Lyons (1920–1933)
- Colonel E. E. B. Mackintosh (1933–1945)
- Herman Shaw (1945–1950)
- F. Sherwood Taylor (1950–1956)
- Sir Terence Morrison-Scott (1956–1960)
- Sir David Follett (1960–1973)
- Dame Margaret Weston (1973–1986)
- Neil Cossons (1986–2000)
- Lindsay Sharp (2000–2002)

The following have been head/director of the Science Museum in London, not including its satellite museums:

- Jon Tucker (2002–2007, Head)
- Chris Rapley (2007–2010)

The following have been directors of the National Museum of Science and Industry, (since April 2012 renamed the Science Museum Group) which oversees the Science Museum and other related museums, from 2002:

- Lindsay Sharp (2002–2005)
- Jon Tucker (2005–06, Acting Director)
- Martin Earwicker (2006–2009)
- Molly Jackson (2009)
- Andrew Scott (2009–10)
- Ian Blatchford (2010–)
