= Science and Innovation Park =

Research and cultural site near Swindon, England

- Location in Wiltshire
- Former name: National Collections Centre, Science Museum at Wroughton, RAF Wroughton
- Established: 1979
- Location: Wroughton, near Swindon, Wiltshire, England
- Coordinates: 51°30′44.1″N 1°48′46″W
- Type: Visible storage
- Director: Ian Blatchford
- Website: www.scienceinnovationpark.org.uk

Science Museum Group
- National Railway Museum; Locomotion Museum; Science & Media; Science & Industry; Science Museum; Dana Research Centre and Library; National Collections Centre

The Science and Innovation Park (SIP) is a research and cultural site at Wroughton, near Swindon, England. Part of the Science Museum Group, the 545 acres (221 ha) Park hosts a range of research and development activity, filming and photography projects, storage for culture sector partners and other commercial activity. It is the home of around 80% of the Science Museum Group's collection, largely housed in the Hawking Building.

== History ==
The Science Museum took ownership of the 545-acre former RAF Wroughton airfield in 1979, to be used as a storage facility for the museum's largest objects. In 2007 the collection of the Science Museum Library and Archives was also relocated to new facilities at the site.

The Science Museum Group, the British Museum and the Victoria and Albert Museum had previously used Blythe House in London as storage, but had to move out after the government announced its intention to sell the building. The Science Museum Group received £40m from the government to develop and create a high-quality accessible facility for the management of the collection at the site in Wroughton.

In 2018, the project to create a new purpose-built facility to care for the collection began. It was completed in 2021 and is now the Science Museum Group’s primary collections management facility. In October 2024 the Hawking Building, named in recognition of Stephen Hawking's life long association with the museum, was opened to the public as a new facility to house the collection and make it more accessible for visitors.

== Activity ==
=== Science Museum Group Collections ===
The primary role of the Science and Innovation Park (formerly the National Collections Centre) is to conserve and manage the collections of the Science Museum Group. Over 300,000 objects are housed at the site in former aircraft hangars and a modern purpose-built collection management facility, the Hawking Building, named after the late Stephen Hawking.

The facility is 90m wide and 300m long, and has conservation laboratories, research areas and photography studios alongside a storage hall with 30,000 metres of shelving to house the collection. Access by researchers to objects can be requested by appointment. The National Collections Centre also hosts bookable tours for the public and school visits.

Objects stored at the centre include:

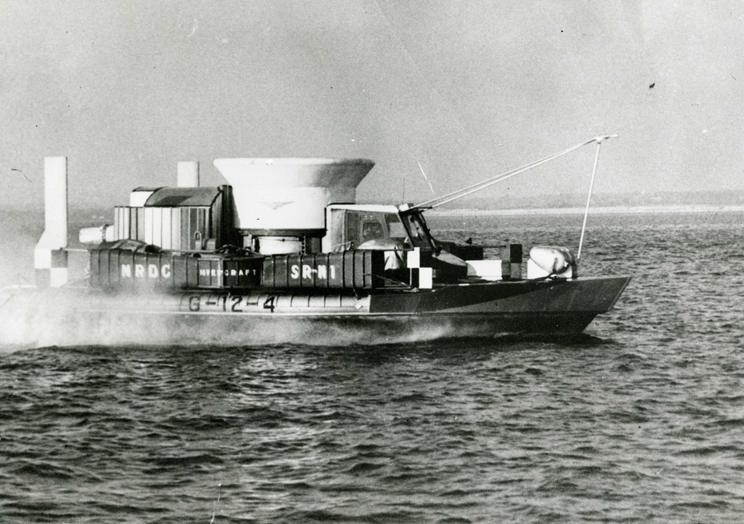
SRN1 hovercraft

- Douglas DC-3 aircraft
- Ford Edsel motor car
- Boeing 247 aircraft
- McLaren MP4/7A Monocoque Chassis, driven by Ayrton Senna
- de Havilland Comet 4B G-APYD, Hawker Siddeley HS-121 Trident 3B G-AWZM and Lockheed Constellation N7777G, the only Constellation preserved in the United Kingdom
- A double-decker bus
- A TV detector van
- The world's first amphibious hovercraft
- Early 20th-century electric vehicles
- The Woods Press, the last hot metal printing press in Fleet Street

==== Library and Archives ====
The Science Museum Library and Archives are also held at the Science and Innovation Park. They contain original scientific, technical and medical works from the last 500 years. The printed collections include rare books and first editions, journals from the 16th to the 20th centuries, trade literature, exhibition catalogues, British patents from 1617 to 1992 as well as over 85,000 books focussing on the history and social aspects of science, technology and medicine. The named archive collections include personal papers, photographs, glass plate negatives, company records and technical drawings.

The Science Museum Library was founded in 1883 as the Science Library of the South Kensington Museum. It was formed of collections from the South Kensington Educational Library and the library of the Museum of Practical Geology. In 1907 it moved to the Royal College of Science building. When the Science Museum gained its independence in 1909, the Science Library became its responsibility.

In 1992 the Library joined with Imperial College London to form the Imperial College & Science Museum Libraries. Due to the increasing demand for space in South Kensington, about 85% of the collections and all of the archives were moved to a specially adapted library building at Wroughton in 2007. By 2014, almost all of the library had been moved there. Researchers can apply to have items brought to the Dana Research Centre and Library in South Kensington.

Amongst the library and archives holdings are:

- Charles Babbage's notebooks, engineering plans, certificates, social diary and letters.
- Barnes Wallis's plans for the bouncing bomb.
- Pearson PLC engineering papers and photographs.
- Walt Patterson's nuclear collection.
- Humphry Davy's letters.
- George Parker Bidder's papers.
- The New Cyclopaedia, or, Universal Dictionary of the Arts and Sciences (Rees's Cyclopædia).

=== Sustainability ===
In April 2021 the Science Museum Group announced that it is targeting to achieve overall Net Zero / Carbon Neutrality by 2033. The Science and Innovation Park hosts one of the UK's largest solar farms, completed in 2016, which is capable of generating close to 50GWh of energy per year, three times more than that consumed by the Science Museum Group as a whole.

The Park contains large open grasslands and 30 hectares of native woodlands. More than a hundred bird and bat boxes together with log piles, hibernacula, beehives, and species-rich grassland provide habitats and homes for reptiles, insects and other wildlife. In a further commitment to biodiversity, 1,000 native trees will be planted annually throughout the 2020s, joining 49,000 trees already planted by the Science Museum Group at the site.

Staff offices at the site benefit from solar hot water, while green-roofed bike racks provide space for insects and plants as well as bicycle storage. Dedicated electric car charging points encourage more sustainable transport methods, complementing electric vehicles already in use at the Science and Innovation Park. Recycled plastic road materials provide sustainable surfaces for access roads and the service yard, aiding drainage and reducing carbon emissions. Hemp and lime have been combined to create a low-energy, humidity-controlled Hempcrete store providing a carefully managed space for some of the most vulnerable objects in the collection.

The new collections management facility is the Science Museum Group’s most energy efficient building yet, with sector-leading innovations in low energy intensity collections care. A 'fabric first' design approach maximised the performance of the facility’s building materials to improve energy efficiency while reducing energy needs, operational costs and carbon emissions. The sustainable choice of a highly insulated and airtight facility allows the environmental conditions needed for the collection to be maintained with minimal energy use. Solar photovoltaic panels on the roof meet part of the site’s electricity needs, with biomass boilers providing heating for dehumidification. Limiting access points to the building, the inclusion of a loading bay airlock and the use of intelligent LED lighting all further reduce the facility’s energy demands.

Rainwater at the facility is captured to create a large wetland area encircled by Clout's Wood, a Site of Special Scientific Interest.

=== Other activities at the site ===
The Science and Innovation Park is regularly used for research and development, films and television, storage for other culture sector partners and testing of equipment for new technology and energy projects.

Inserts for the television series The Grand Tour were filmed on the site's former airfield roads from 2016 to 2019.

== See also ==
- List of museums in Wiltshire
