= Dana Research Centre and Library =

Coordinates: 51.4971°N 0.1790°W

Dana Library and Research Centre
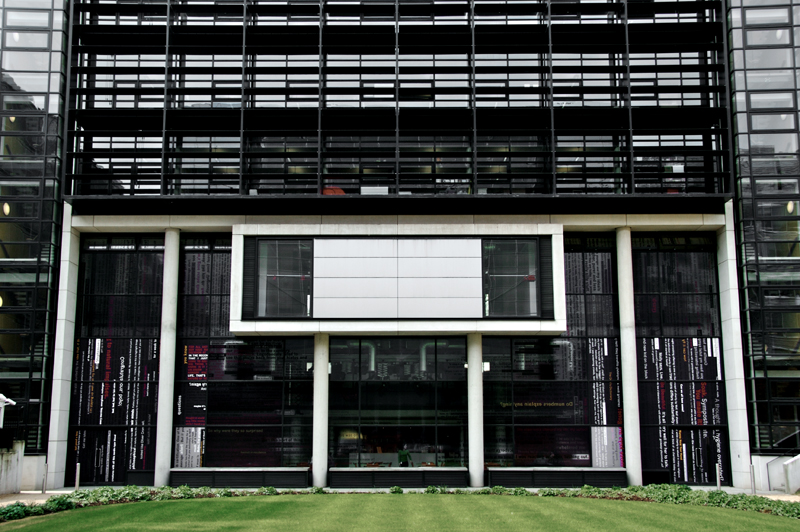
- Established: 2003
- Location: 165 Queen's Gate, London SW7
- Public transit access: Gloucester Road, South Kensington
- Website: www.sciencemuseum.org.uk/researchers/dana-research-centre-and-library

Science Museum Group
- National Railway Museum; Locomotion Museum; Science & Media; Science & Industry; Science Museum; Dana Research Centre and Library; National Collections Centre

The Dana Library and Research Centre (formerly the Dana Centre) on Queen's Gate, South Kensington, London, is a venue where researchers and visitors can access the library and archives of the Science Museum Group.

== History ==
Designed by Sir Richard MacCormac of MJP Architects, the building opened in 2003 as a public event venue for contemporary science debate, run largely by the Science Museum. The building itself houses offices used by the Science Museum and the British Science Association (formerly known as British Association for the Advancement of Science). The Dana Centre is not directly accessible from the main museum, and is on the nearby Queen's Gate street.

Previously an events space and café, the building re-opened in late 2015 as the Dana Library and Research Centre, aiming to "provide a world-class environment for academic research, bringing together the Science Museum's Research and Public History Department and access to its library and archive collections".

== Opening times ==
The library is currently open to researchers and visitors on Mondays, Tuesdays and Wednesdays between 10am and 4pm. It is closed on all UK Bank Holidays and closes daily for an hour lunch period between 12.30 and 13.30.

== Access to the collection ==
Visitors to the Dana Centre can access approximately 8,000 volumes on the history and biography of science, technology and medicine and their philosophical and social aspects. Journals are also available in physical and digital formats, with core titles being mainly available electronically.

As 99% of the Science Museum's library and archives are held at the Library and Archives at the Science and Innovation Park, in Wiltshire, most material will need to be ordered in advance.
