= Henry George Lyons =

British geologist

Colonel Sir Henry George Lyons FRS (11 October 1864 – 10 August 1944) was a British geologist and director of the Science Museum in London.

Henry Lyons was born in London, the son of General Thomas Lyons. Lyons was educated at Wellington College and the Royal Military Academy, Woolwich and at the age of 18 was elected to the Geological Society. In 1884, he was commissioned a Lieutenant in the Royal Engineers. He was posted to Cairo in 1890. In 1892 he cleared and surveyed several Ancient Egyptian temples at Buhen. From 1909 to 1911 he was the first head of the department of geology at the University of Glasgow.

In 1896, he married Helen Hardwick, a daughter of the London architect Philip Charles Hardwick (1822–1892).

In 1920, with the retiring rank of colonel, Lyons became director of the Science Museum, and was knighted in the 1926 Birthday Honours. He introduced working models, exhibited new developments such as the aeroplane, cinema, radio, and gramophone. He also contributed the children's gallery. He served as president of the Geographical Association in 1929.

He died at Great Missenden, aged 79.

== Publications ==
- "Magnetic Observations in Egypt, 1893—1901" in Proceedings of the Royal Society, vol. 71, 1902–03.
- "On the Relation between Variations of Atmospheric Pressure in North-East Africa and the Nile Flood" in Proceedings of the Royal Society A: Mathematical, Physical and Engineering Sciences, vol. 76, no. 507, 22 April 1905.
- The Physiography of the River Nile and its Basin (Cairo: National Printing Department, 1906).
- A Report on the Temples of Philae (Cairo: National Printing Department, 1908).
- The Cadastral Survey of Egypt, 1892-1907 (Cairo: National Printing Department, 1908).
- "The Importance of Geographical Research", in Science, N.S. vol. xlii, no. 1087, 29 October 1915.
- "Science in Egypt" in Nature, vol. 110, no. 2756, 26 August 1922.

Cultural offices
Preceded by Sir Francis Grant Ogilvie	Director of the Science Museum; 1920–1933	Succeeded by Colonel E. E. B. Mackintosh
