= Herman Shaw =

British geophysicist

Dr Herman Shaw (14 October 1892 – 4 May 1950) was a British geophysicist who was Director of the Science Museum in London, England.

Shaw was born on 14 October 1891 and was the only son of G. H. Shaw of Huddersfield, Yorkshire. He was educated at Bradford Grammar School, followed by studying for a degree in physics at the Royal College of Science, starting in 1911 as a Royal Scholar. During World War I, he served as a Lieutenant in the Royal Naval Volunteer Reserve (1915), Flight Lieutenant in the Royal Naval Air Service (1916), and a Captain in the Royal Flying Corps (1917).

In 1925, Shaw joined the Science Museum as a member of staff, rising to become the Keeper of Physics and Geophysics, and then the Director of the museum. He was particularly interested in research about geophysics, and was awarded a DSc degree by the University of London for research using a Eötvös pendulum in 1931. He was a member of the Physical Society and acted as treasurer. In 1936, he co-organized a meeting of the International Union for Geodesy and Geophysics in Edinburgh. He was a founder member of the British Society for the History of Science in 1947.

In 1919, Shaw married Constance Shaw, the eldest daughter of F. Shaw, of Harrow, London. They had a single son, who died in 1946.

== Books ==
- Applied Geophysics, H.M.S.O. for the Science Museum (London), 3rd edition, 1938.

Cultural offices
Preceded by Colonel E. E. B. Mackintosh	Director of the Science Museum; 1945–1950	Succeeded by Sir F. Sherwood Taylor
