= William Isaac Last =

British mechanical engineer and museum curator

William Isaac Last AMICE (1857 – 7 August 1911) was a British mechanical engineer who became a museum curator and the second Director of the Science Museum in London.

W. I. Last was born in Dorchester and educated as a mechanical engineer. He was initially apprenticed with Messrs. Haywood, Tyler and Company. For the first part of his career, he was involved in civil engineering and mechanical engineering activities in England and South Africa. In 1890, he was appointed to the position of Keeper of the Machinery and Inventions division of the South Kensington Museum. He was promoted to Senior Keeper in 1900, when the scientific part of the museum had been split into the Science Museum, and then became Director of the museum in 1904 until his death in 1911.

He was an Associate Member of the Institution of Civil Engineers.

Cultural offices
Preceded by Major-General Edward Robert Festing	Director of the Science Museum; 1904–1911	Succeeded by Sir Francis Grant Ogilvie
