= Science and Industry Museum =

Museum in Manchester, England

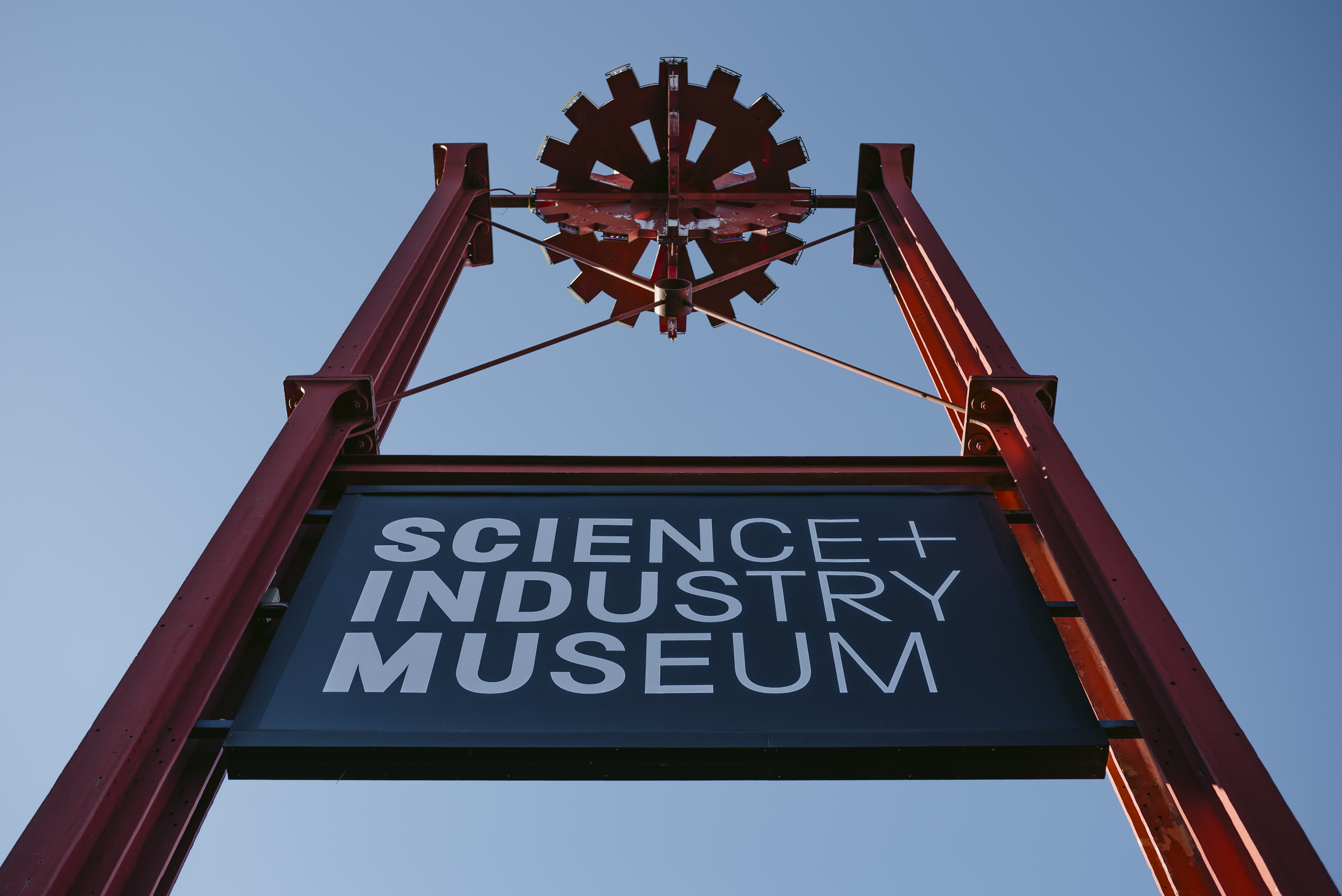
- Entrance structure reflecting its science/industrial themes

- Location within Greater Manchester
- Established: 15 September 1983
- Location: Liverpool Road, Manchester, England
- Coordinates: 53°28′37″N 2°15′20″W
- Type: Science museum
- Visitors: 421,488 (2025)
- Public transit access: Metroshuttle – Green Route
- Website: scienceandindustrymuseum.org.uk

Science Museum Group
- National Railway Museum; Locomotion Museum; Science & Media; Science & Industry; Science Museum; Dana Research Centre and Library; National Collections Centre

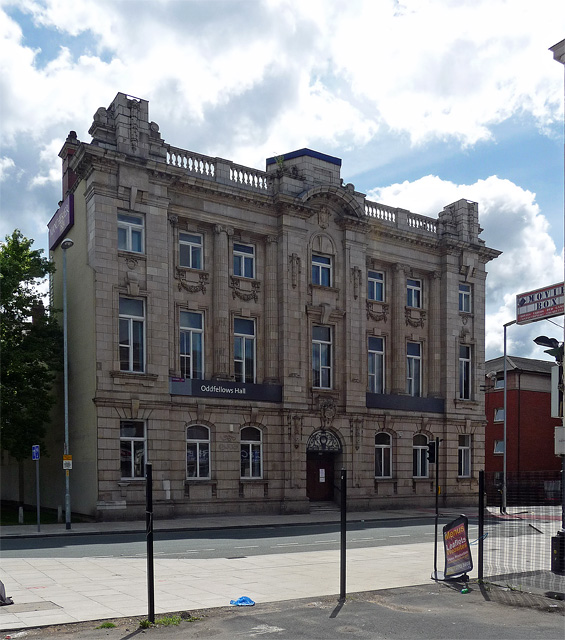
Oddfellows Hall, the first home of the museum

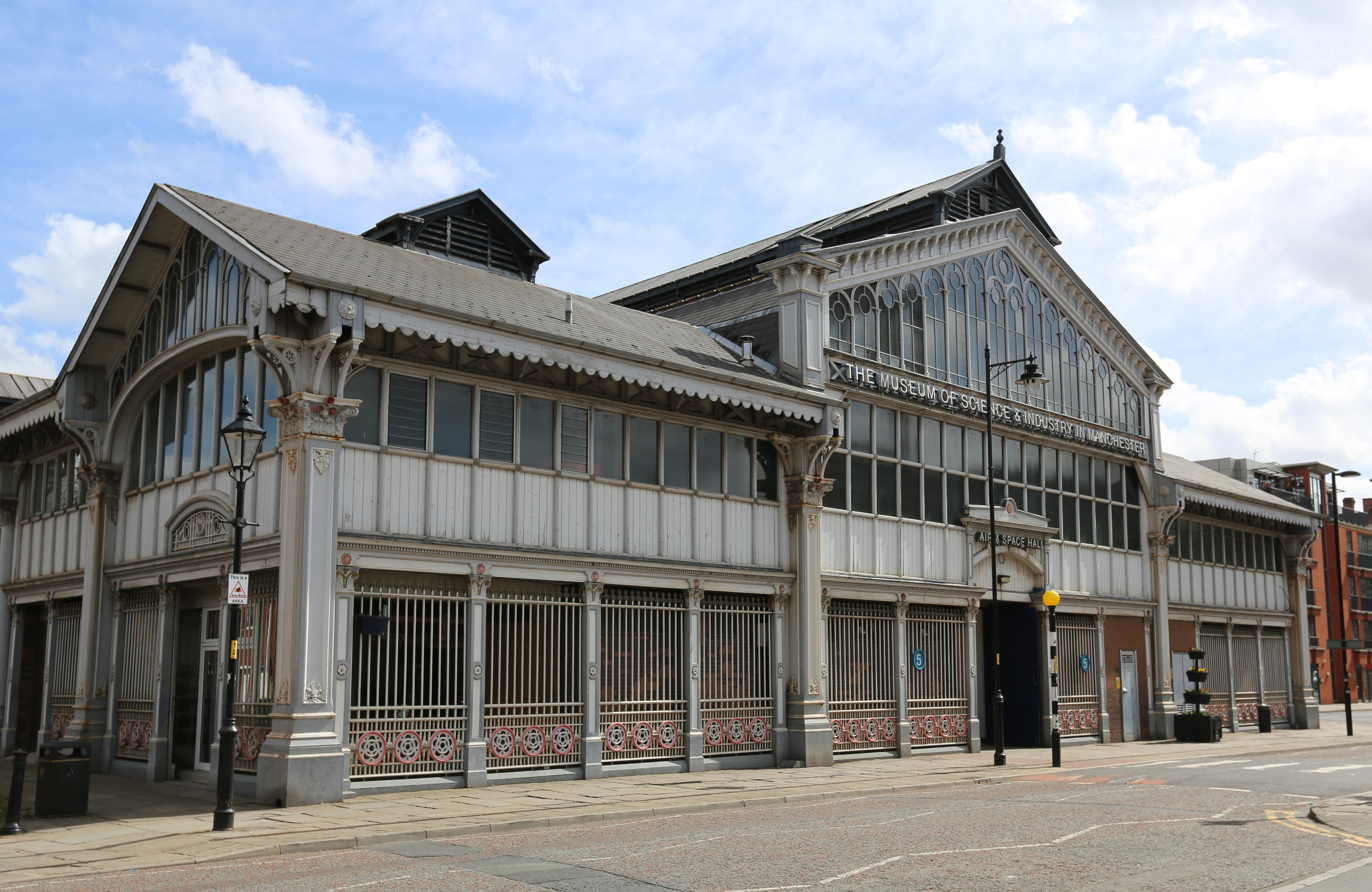
Exterior of the museum's Air and Space Hall

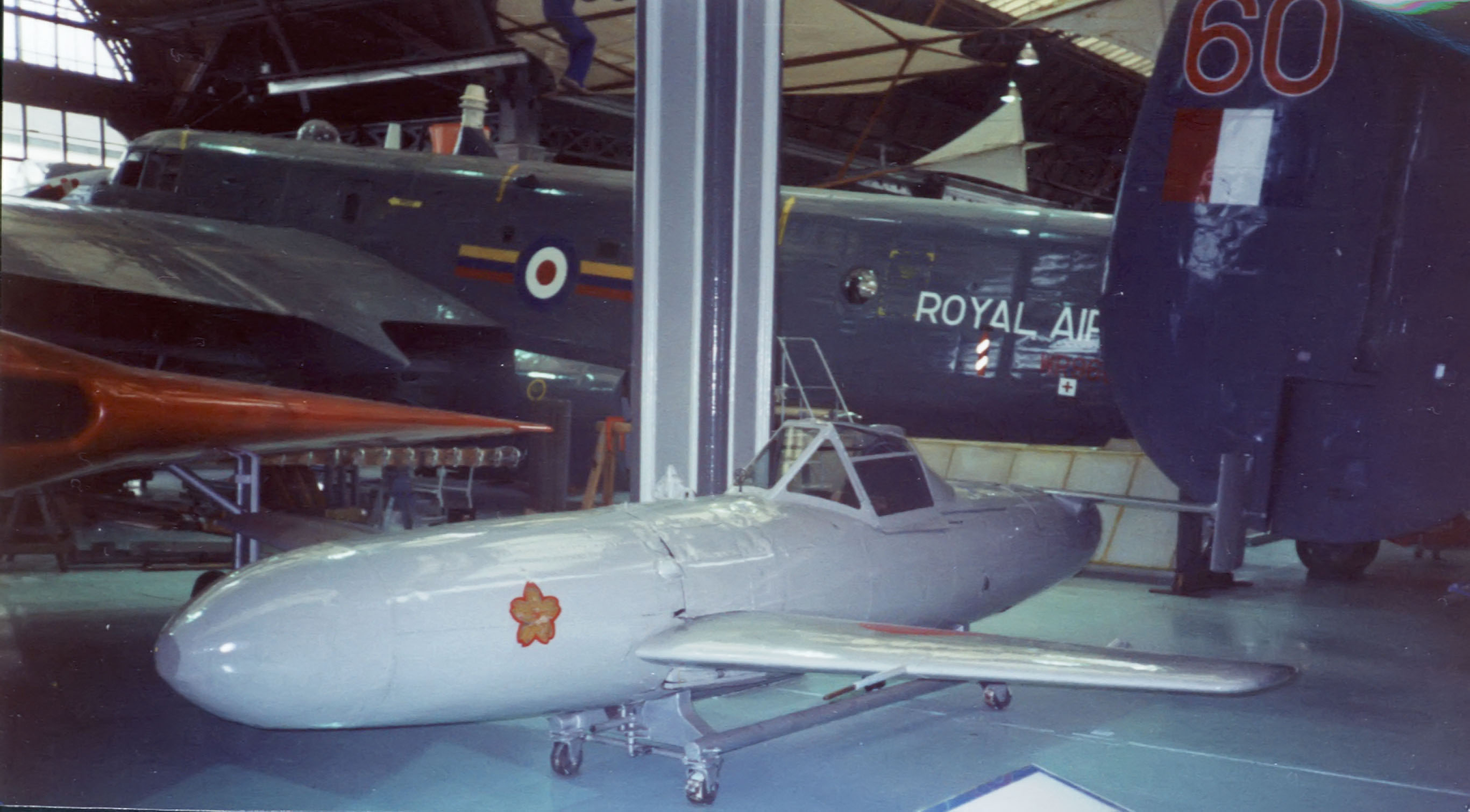
A kamikaze Ohka aircraft in exhibition

The Science and Industry Museum in Manchester, England, traces the development of science, technology and industry with emphasis on the city's achievements in these fields. The museum is part of the Science Museum Group, a non-departmental public body of the Department for Culture, Media and Sport, having merged with the National Science Museum in 2012.

There are extensive displays on the theme of transport (cars, railway locomotives and rolling stock), power (water, electricity, steam and gas engines), Manchester's sewerage and sanitation, textiles, communications and computing.

The museum is an Anchor Point of the European Route of Industrial Heritage and is on the site of the world's first inter-urban passenger railway station – Manchester Liverpool Road – which opened as part of the Liverpool & Manchester Railway in 1830. The railway station frontage and 1830 warehouse are both Grade I listed. The New Warehouse and Power Hall are both Grade II listed.

== History ==
The museum was called the North Western Museum of Science and Industry when it opened in 1969 in temporary premises on Grosvenor Street in Chorlton-on-Medlock. It had close ties with the University of Manchester Institute of Science & Technology, having mostly grown out of the Department of History of Science & Technology, and UMIST's Richard L. Hills was the museum's first lecturer in charge.

In 1978, Greater Manchester Council purchased the earliest part of the former Liverpool Road station from British Rail, which had been closed in 1975. The council paid the nominal sum of £1 for the site. The museum opened at this site on 15 September 1983 and later expanded to include the whole of the former station.

Since 2007 the museum has organised an annual science festival in Manchester.

In 2014, Sally MacDonald became the director. MacDonald left her role as head of collections at University College London and succeeded Jean Franczyk as director.

In 2021, the permanent closure of the Air and Space Hall was announced. Objects were returned to their original owners, and those owned by the museum displayed in future exhibits.

== Exhibitions ==
Exhibits at the Science and Industry Museum include:

=== Revolution Manchester Gallery ===
A journey through Manchester's legacy of industrial innovations, scientific discoveries and ideas that started life in Manchester and went on to change the world. Highlights in this gallery include:

- A working replica of the Manchester Baby, the Manchester Small-Scale Experimental Machine which is the ancestor of every modern computer.
- A 1905 One of the earliest Rolls-Royce motorcars and one of three remaining cars of this type. Built in Hulme, Manchester in 1905.
- Sign depicting Dizzy Gillespie from the Band on the Wall live music venue in Manchester's Northern Quarter.

=== Textiles Gallery ===
The Textiles Gallery tells the story of the people, places and products that made it and their continuing legacy in our city and our world today. Dubbed 'Cottonopolis', Manchester was once the international centre of the world’s cotton industry. This gallery paints a picture of how cotton transformed Manchester into an urban metropolis and shaped lives here and around the world. The gallery also displays objects revealing how Manchester's cotton industry was connected to transatlantic slavery, alongside the first-hand testimony of African American anti-slavery campaigner Frederick Douglass, and African American woman Mary Reynolds, who, like Douglass was formerly enslaved. Highlights in this gallery include:

- Arkwright's Water Frame, one of the earliest examples of the invention created by Richard Arkwright, Cromford, c. 1775, and used at the Arkwright Mills at Matlock Bath.
- Hand painted Indian cotton fabric sample known as a palampore, made in India around 1700-1800, for export to Europe. Traders brought the cloth from India for sale in Britain where it was prized for its quality and beauty.
- Pair of children's clogs stamped with ‘CSRS loaned, not to be pawned’. They were lent by Charter Street Ragged School in Angel Meadow, Manchester, to children whose families could not afford to buy shoes.

=== Power Hall: The Andrew Law Gallery ===
The Andrew Law Gallery is a Grade II listed building and home to one of the UK's largest collections of historic engines.

Highlights in this gallery include:

==== Locomotives ====
- Beyer-Garratt South African Railways Locomotive, Class GL, made by Beyer, Peacock & Co. Ltd, Manchester, 1929 and used by South African Railways as locomotive no. 2352.
- Pakistan Railways 4–4–0 No. 3157 (broad gauge) Originally built for North Western Railway of India by Vulcan Foundry, Newton-le-Willows (around 1911–1914).
- Ericsson's Novelty – A replica incorporating parts from the original locomotive of 1829.
- British Rail Class 77 No. 27001, liveried as Nederlandse Spoorwegen (Dutch Railways) No. 1505, Ariadne – A 1.5 kV DC electric locomotive built by Metropolitan-Vickers in 1953.

==== Engines ====
- Firgrove Mill Steam Engine. Tandem compound condensing engine, made by J. & W. McNaught, Rochdale, 1907 and used at Firgrove Mill in Rochdale.
- Crossley Horizontal Single-cylinder Engine, an example of the first type of internal-combustion engine to work on Otto's four-stroke principle, patented in 1876, making it the direct ancestor of present-day piston internal-combustion engines.
- Metropolitan-Vickers steam turbine and generator. Originally used to generate electricity for a brickworks, this engine was later removed by Metropolitan-Vickers apprentices and used for training purposes.

== Former galleries ==
Previous permanent exhibition galleries which have now been decommissioned include:

- Electricity Gallery - generation, distribution and use of electricity
- Gas Gallery - past to present look at the gas industry
- Underground Manchester - sanitation and water supply
- A space-themed gallery, with exhibits encompassing historical space flight, space science and also science-fiction, formerly took up the majority of the upper balcony of the Air and Space hall. This was eventually considered outdated and removed in its entirety.
- A Connected Earth gallery, called Connecting Manchester, that tells the history of communications in Manchester and the North West of England opened in October 2007.

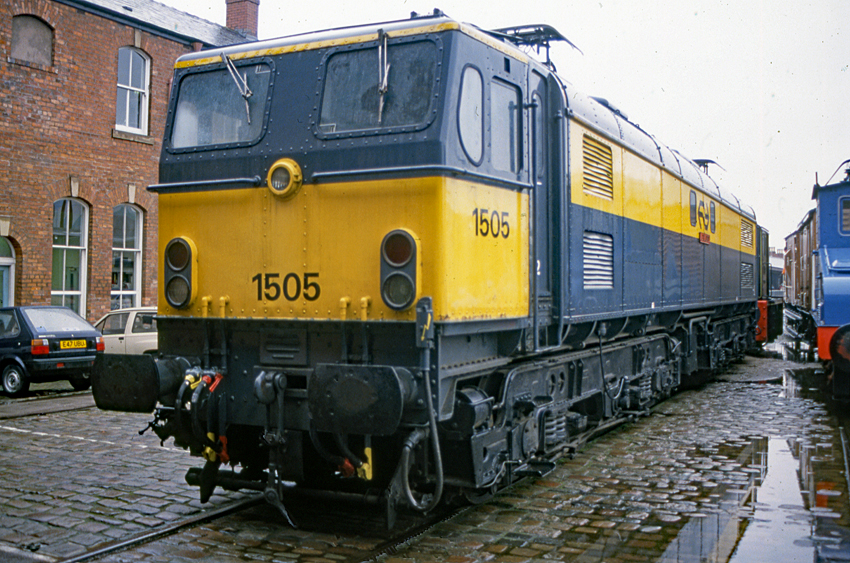
NS 1505 Ariadne outside the muse

=== Some past exhibitions ===
- Body Worlds 4 between 22 February and 29 June 2008
- LMR 57 Lion Britain's oldest steamable locomotive (in the Museum of Liverpool since 2007)
- Stephenson's Rocket – from 25 September 2018 to 8 September 2019
- Operation Ouch! Brains, bogies and you 14 February 2025 – 4 January 2026

== Archive ==
The museum is home to a significant archive collection, which can be accessed by researchers by appointment. Key collections highlights include:

- The Beyer Peacock archive, which includes minute books, order books, correspondence, over 2,500 works photographs and almost 4,000 engineering drawings.
- The Ferranti company archive covering the period 1882 to 1993, when the company ceased trading. The archive includes company records, technical records, trade literature and a large photographic collection.
- Jean Elizabeth Gregson | collection, including coursework notebooks, reference folders, samples of textile design work, art school course work, and certificates awarded by the Royal Drawing Society for success in drawing examinations at Sale High School for Girls.

== Railway ==
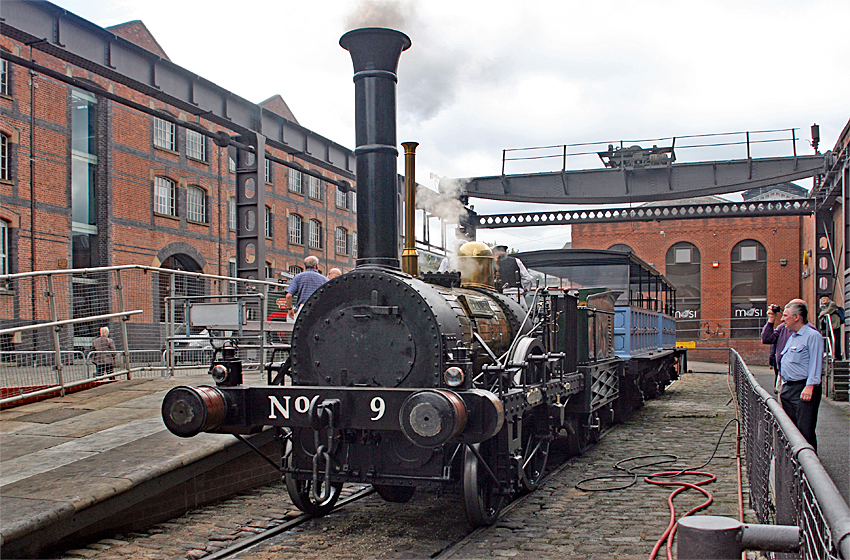
9 Planet replica 2-2-0

Until 2018, demonstration passenger trains ran within the museum grounds on selected dates. Trains were hauled by the museum's two operational steam locomotives:

- Planet – A replica of Robert Stephenson & Company's Planet class locomotive, built by the Friends of the Museum of Science and Industry in 1992. The original locomotive was constructed in 1830 and hauled trains on the Liverpool and Manchester Railway.
- Agecroft No. 1 – An 0–4–0 saddle tank built by Robert Stephenson & Hawthorns in 1948 for use at Agecroft Power Station. Restored to working order in 2011.

The museum's railway line was connected to the national rail network near Ordsall Lane Junction. However, construction by Network Rail of the Ordsall Chord railway link, which was completed in 2017, severed this connection and significantly shortened the museum's running line despite a legal battle to save it.

As of 2019, railway operations at the museum were suspended indefinitely. In June 2024, the museum confirmed that the railway would not resume operations, citing both the shortened line and concerns over loadbearing issues on the historic structures on the site. The tracks will be incorporated into a redevelopment of the site that will improve accessibility to the area.

== Industrial machines ==
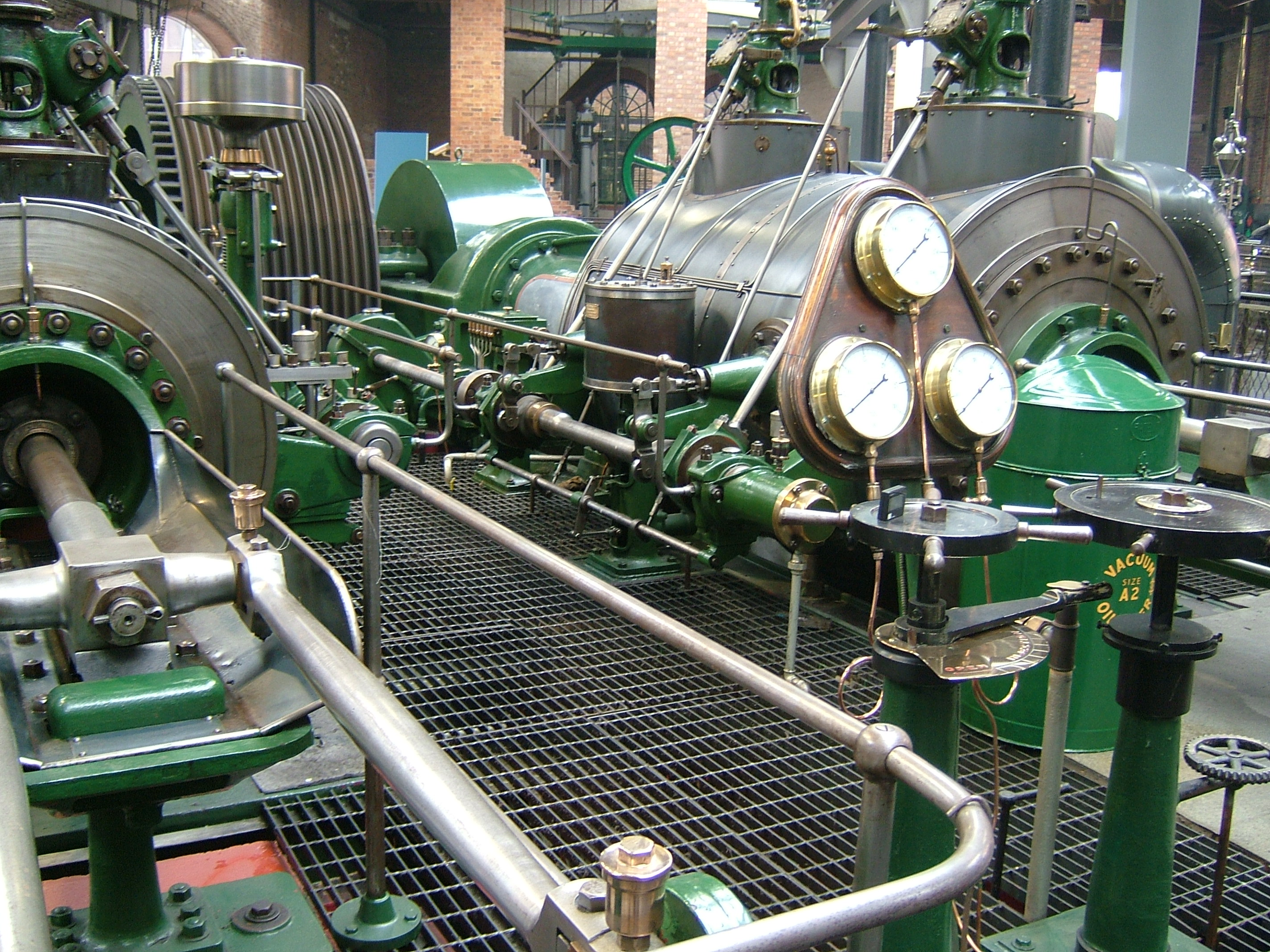
The last steam engine ever built to power a mill

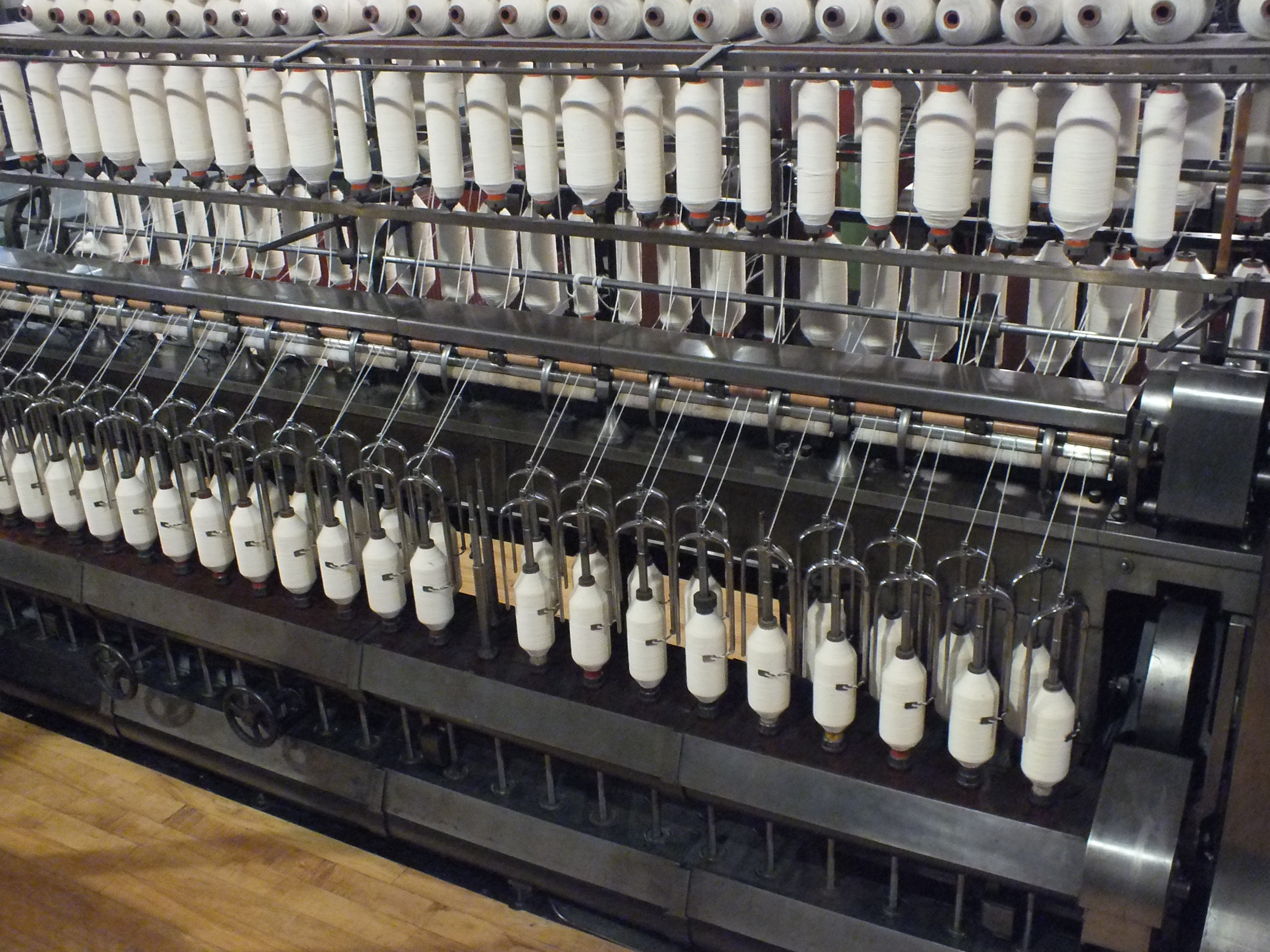
Spinning machine

The museum exhibits the large collection of stationary steam engines, hot air engines, diesel engines, hydraulic pumps, large electric generators and other similar machines. Most of these machines are operational and occasionally can be seen running. This exhibit includes the last stationary steam engine built to power a mill.

There is also the exhibit of spinning and weaving machines, covering all the steps from wool to textile. These machines are run for a few minutes at scheduled times.

== Adjacent St John's Quarter ==
The museum is adjacent to a £1 billion redevelopment area on the former site of Granada Studios, launched in 2024 as St John's Quarter. The Manchester International Festival's new Factory International venue opened alongside the MSI in 2023 as part of the redevelopment.

The MSI have been granted planning permission to build a new Special Exhibition Gallery on the ground floor of the New Warehouse. Architectural firm Carmody Groarke won a competition to design the new gallery which fully reopened in 2025.

Back in July 2016 the council had stated that, along with development partner Allied London, they had been in talks with the MSI "exploring how the presence of Factory opens up new possibilities for revitalising the whole area below Deansgate as a creative hub, with a joined up and extensive public realm. MSI's own developments plans are being aligned with this creative vision and the museum itself will become part of the creative public realm, with MSI's creative science offer balancing the creative and cultural production of Factory."

== See also ==
- Museum of Transport, Greater Manchester
- List of museums in Greater Manchester
- List of transport museums
- List of aerospace museums
