= E. E. B. Mackintosh =

- Born: 3 November 1880
- Died: 25 November 1957 (aged 77)
- Military career
- Allegiance: United Kingdom
- Branch: British Army
- Service years: 1899–1933; 1939–1940
- Rank: Colonel
- Service number: 9228
- Unit: Royal Engineers
- Commands: School of Military Engineering, Chatham (1939–40)
- Conflicts: First World War; Second World War
- Awards: Distinguished Service Order; Mentioned in Despatches; Legion of Honour (France)
- Other work: Director of the Science Museum (1933–45)

Colonel Ernest Elliot Buckland Mackintosh, DSO (3 November 1880 – 25 November 1957) was a British Army officer, engineer, and a Director and Secretary of the Science Museum in London. He was appointed Director and Secretary of the Science Museum following the retirement of Sir Henry Lyons in October 1933, and continued in the role until 30 November 1945.

== Military career ==
Mackintosh was educated at Eton College and Royal Military Academy, Woolwich, then commissioned in the Royal Engineers in 1899. During the First World War he was mentioned in despatches and awarded the Distinguished Service Order (DSO) and the French Legion of Honour. After the war he reached the rank of colonel before retiring in 1933. He came out of retirement briefly during the Second World War to be commandant of the School of Military Engineering, Chatham, from 1939 to 1940.

== Quotations ==
There can be no doubt that high-definition television is one of the most remarkable technical achievements of our times. (1937)

== Publications ==
- E. E. B. Mackintosh, Special Exhibitions at the Science Museum. Museums Journal, Volume 37, 317–327, October 1937.
- E. E. B. Mackintosh, Preservation of physical apparatus of historical importance. Journal of Scientific Instruments, Volume 19, Issue 10, pages 156–157, October 1942. Institute of Physics. doi:10.1088/0950-7671/19/10/104

Cultural offices
Preceded by Colonel Sir Henry Lyons	Director of the Science Museum; 1933–1945	Succeeded by Dr Herman Shaw
