= Edward Robert Festing =

Major-General Edward Robert Festing CB FRS (10 August 1839 – 16 May 1912), English army officer, chemist, and first Director of the Science Museum in London. He contributed to infrared spectroscopy research with Sir William Abney in the 1880s.

Festing was born in Frome, Somerset, the son of Richard Grindall Festing and Eliza Mammatt. He was educated at Carshalton and King's College School. He was transferred to the Royal Military Academy at Woolwich and then "gazetted" as a lieutenant in the Royal Engineers at the age of only fifteen.

With Sir William de Wiveleslie Abney (also a graduate of the Royal Military Academy, Woolwich), Festing studied the infrared absorption spectra of a number of organic and inorganic chemical compounds. In 1881, they established that the absorption bands were associated with groups of atoms in the molecules rather than the entire molecule. They postulated the correlation of different bands to specific groupings, for instance the nitro group in nitrobenzene. In 1885, Abney and Festing developed a colour photometer and undertook a range of colour measurements.

E. R. Festing joined the South Kensington Museum in 1864. He became one of two assistant directors at the South Kensington Museum. On the retirement of the Director of the museum, Sir Philip Cunliffe-Owen, in 1893, the museum was split into an Art Museum (which subsequently became known as the Victoria and Albert Museum) and a Science Museum. Festing became the first Director of the newly formed Science Museum.

Festing was elected a Fellow of the Royal Society (FRS) on 4 June 1886. He was appointed a Companion of the Order of the Bath (CB) in the 1900 New Year Honours list on 1 January 1900 (the order was gazetted on 16 January 1900), and he was invested by Queen Victoria at Windsor Castle on 1 March 1900.

He was buried on the western side of Highgate Cemetery His grave has no headstone or marker.

== Family ==
Edward Festing was the younger brother of John Wogan Festing (1837–1902), who became the Bishop of St Albans. He had a son, Richard Arthur Grindall Festing, who worked for the Civil Service in Ceylon. He died from heart failure.

== Selected publications ==
- W. de W. Abney and E. R. Festing, Intensity of Radiation through Turbid Media, Proceedings of the Royal Society of London, Volume 40, pages 378–380, 1886. Published by The Royal Society.
- W. de W. Abney and E. R. Festing, Colour Photometry. Part III.Proceedings of the Royal Society of London, Volume 50, pages 369–372, 1 January 1892. Published by The Royal Society. doi:10.1098/rsta.1892.0014

Cultural offices
Preceded by none	Director of the Science Museum; 1893–1904	Succeeded by William Isaac Last
