= Locomotion Museum =

National railway museum in Shildon, United Kingdom

Locomotion
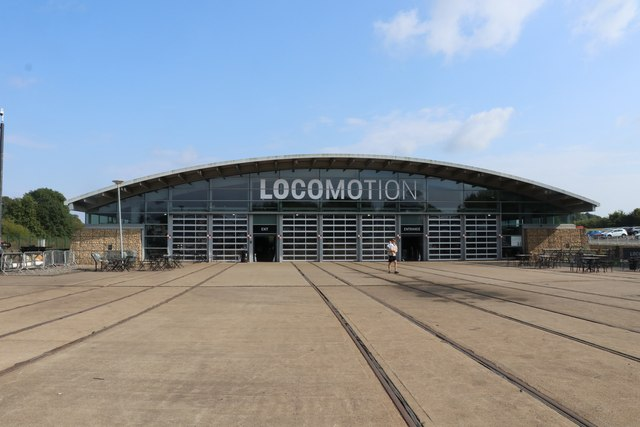
- The exterior of the main building 'Main Hall'
- Former names: Timothy Hackworth Victorian Railway Museum (until 2004); Locomotion the National Railway Museum at Shildon (2004–2017)
- Established: 22 October 2004; 21 years ago
- Location: Shildon, County Durham, England
- Coordinates: 54.6243°N 1.6306°W
- Type: Railway museum
- Visitors: 218,907 (2025)
- Director: Judith McNicol
- Public transit access: Shildon railway station
- Website: www.locomotion.org.uk

Science Museum Group
- National Railway Museum; Locomotion Museum; Science & Media; Science & Industry; Science Museum; Dana Research Centre and Library; National Collections Centre

Locomotion, previously known as Locomotion the National Railway Museum at Shildon, is a railway museum in Shildon, County Durham, England. The museum was renamed in 2017 when it became part of the Science Museum Group.

== Overview ==
The museum was opened on 22 October 2004 by then Prime Minister and local MP Tony Blair. Built at a cost of £11.3 million, it is based on the former "Timothy Hackworth Victorian Railway Museum". The museum is operated in partnership with Durham County Council and was expected to bring 60,000 visitors a year to the small town. It exceeded expectations, and during its first six months, the museum attracted 94,000 visits. Locomotion was shortlisted as one of the final five contenders in the Gulbenkian Prize, which is the largest arts prize in the United Kingdom.

On 24 May 2024, a second building, called 'New Hall', was unveiled to house national collection vehicles built in the old Shildon Works and the surrounding area. In addition, parts of the original museum including the coal drops have been restored, having fallen out of use

In September 2025, the museum was the starting point for the Anniversary Journey of Locomotion No.1, which was a three day journey to Stockton, re-enacting the opening of the Stockton and Darlington Railway in 1825. Prince Edward, Duke of Edinburgh took a ride behind Locomotion No.1 prior to the start of the journey. An estimated 10,000 to 15,000 spectators lined the route from the museum to Hopetown in Darlington.

In June 2026, it was announced that one of the Railway 200 Inspiration Train carriages, Future (the Wonder Lab carriage), would be moving to Locomotion, Shildon.

== Site ==
The museum is sited near Timothy Hackworth's Soho Works on the world's first public railway, the Stockton and Darlington Railway (opened on 27 September 1825 with a train hauled by Locomotion No 1 which took two hours to complete the 12-mile (19 km) journey from Shildon to Darlington). The town was to become a major centre for British railway engineering thanks to the Shildon wagon works, which closed in 1984.

Shildon station, on the Tees Valley Line was rebuilt and modernised as part of the museum's construction and is actually situated adjacent to the trail and demonstration rail line through the museum site. It is served by all services on the line, operated by Northern.

== Museum landmarks ==
The museum is arranged as stops along the 1 km (0.6 miles) demonstration line with station direction board signs and information points on the trail between the car parks and the main collection building. The museum has a six-spur apron in front of the main shed and another short length of track for showing off resident locomotives and visiting trains.

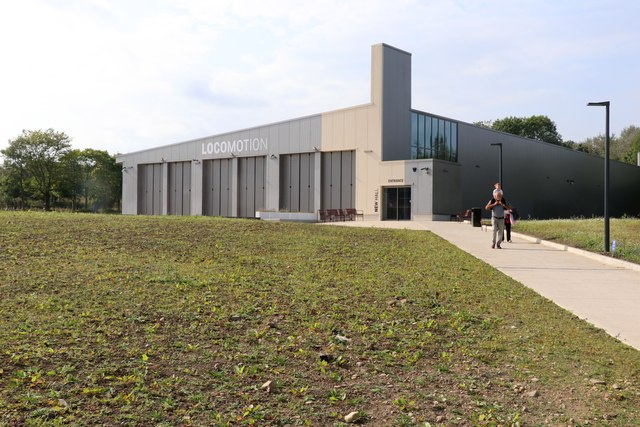
The 2024 addition to the site 'New Hall' situated opposite to the 'Main Hall'

The trail starts at the 19th-century welcome building. The original Sans Pareil was previously on display here (It has since been moved to the Collection Building). The second building is Timothy Hackworth's house. It contains several activities about the history of Shildon. Soho is a stone building that was a railway workshop, having originally been an iron merchant's store. The fourth stop is the former goods shed for the town, with most incoming and outgoing goods being delivered to the railway by horse and cart. The building is built partially from recycled stone sleeper blocks, the old fixing slots being visible in the wall.

The railway station's parcel office is the next part of the trail and at the junction, visible across the tracks are the former stables for the early horse-drawn wagonways that linked to the line. The coal drops were a refuelling point for steam locomotives. Wagons were hauled up an incline and the coal 'dropped' down wooden chutes into the tender below.

The trail passes under the roadway. There is a children's playground and a picnic area outside the Collection Building, the largest building in the museum, where the trail ends. It contains the exhibition hall and a conservation workshop with viewing gallery to see the work carried out by volunteers restoring some of the exhibits. Other facilities in the building include interactive games, a cafe and shop.

Locomotion landmarks
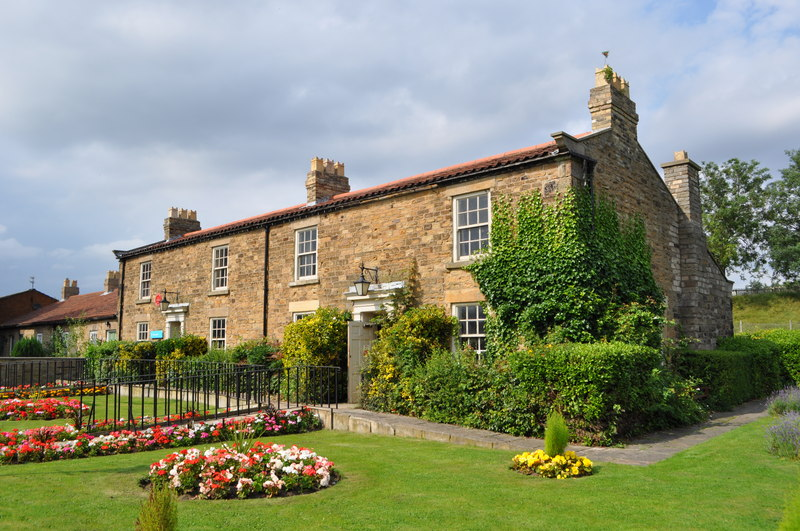
Hackworth's cottage

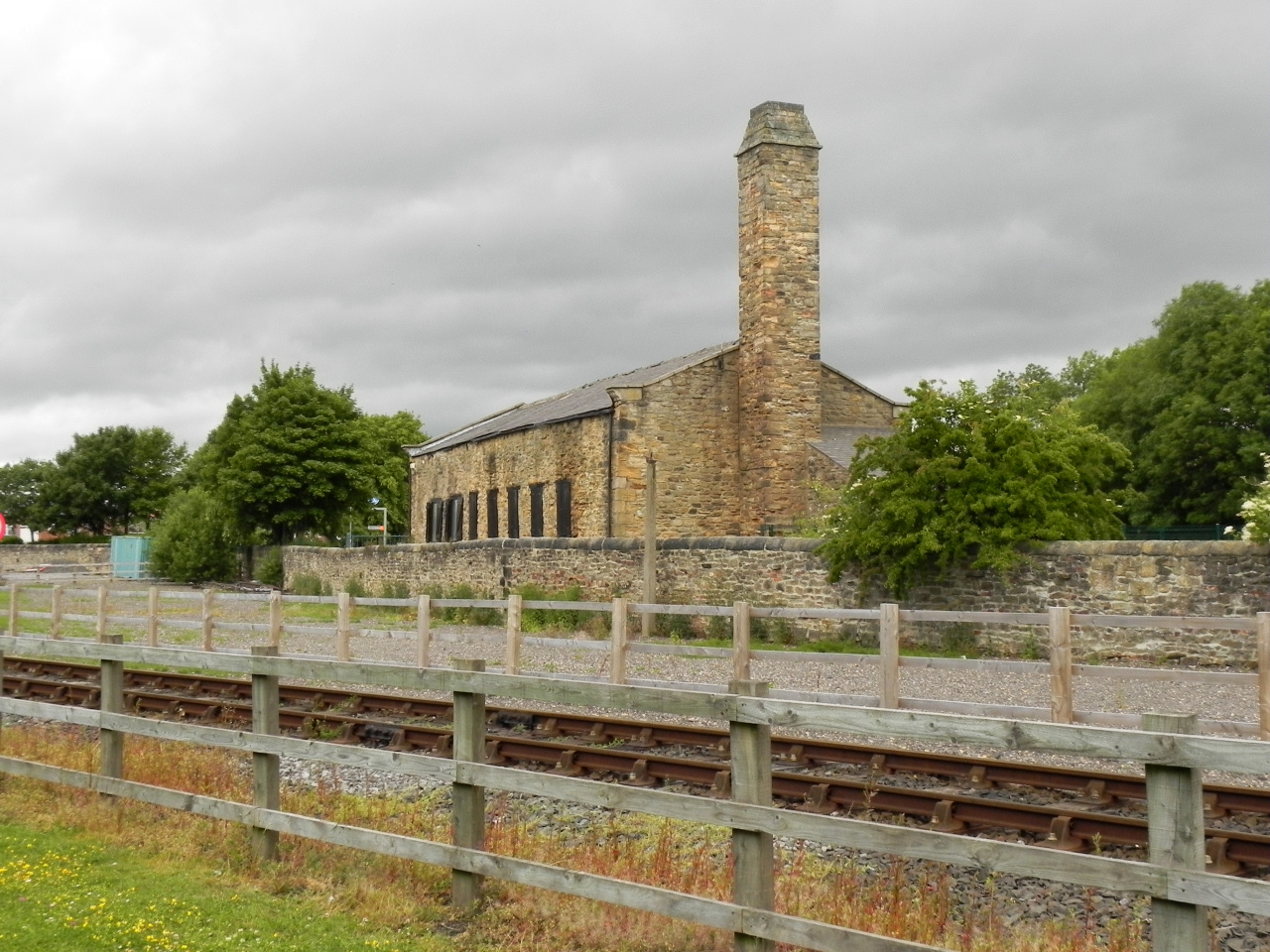
Soho workshop

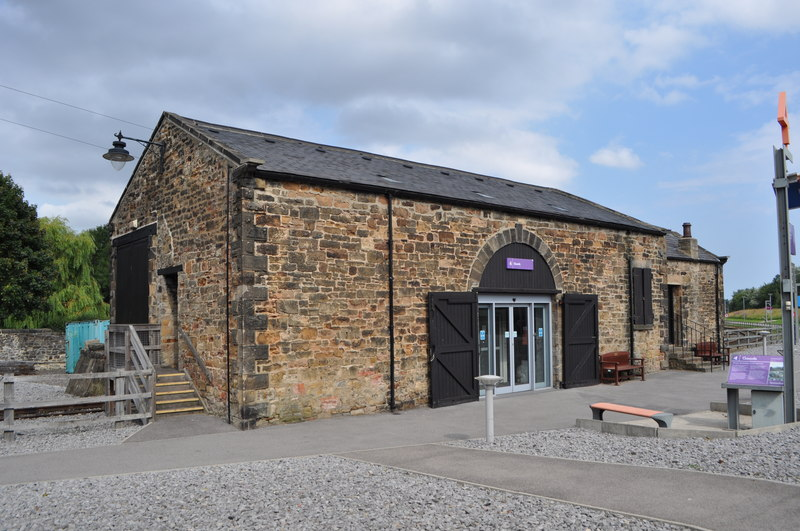
Goods shed

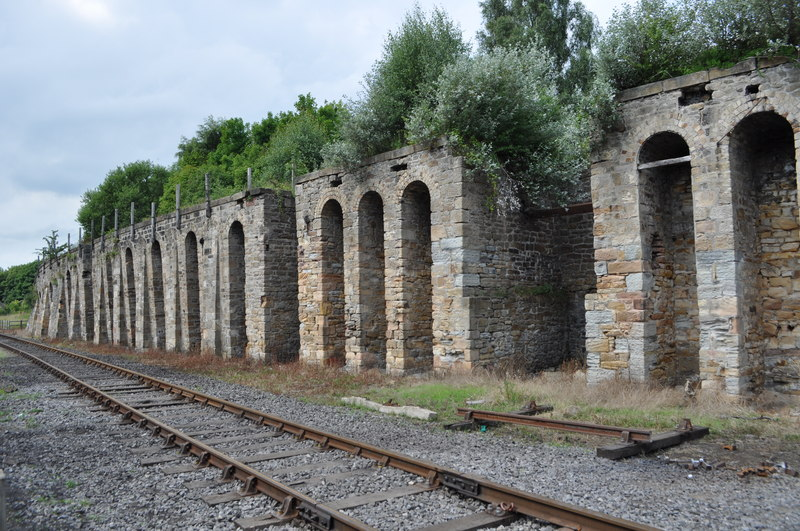
Coal drops

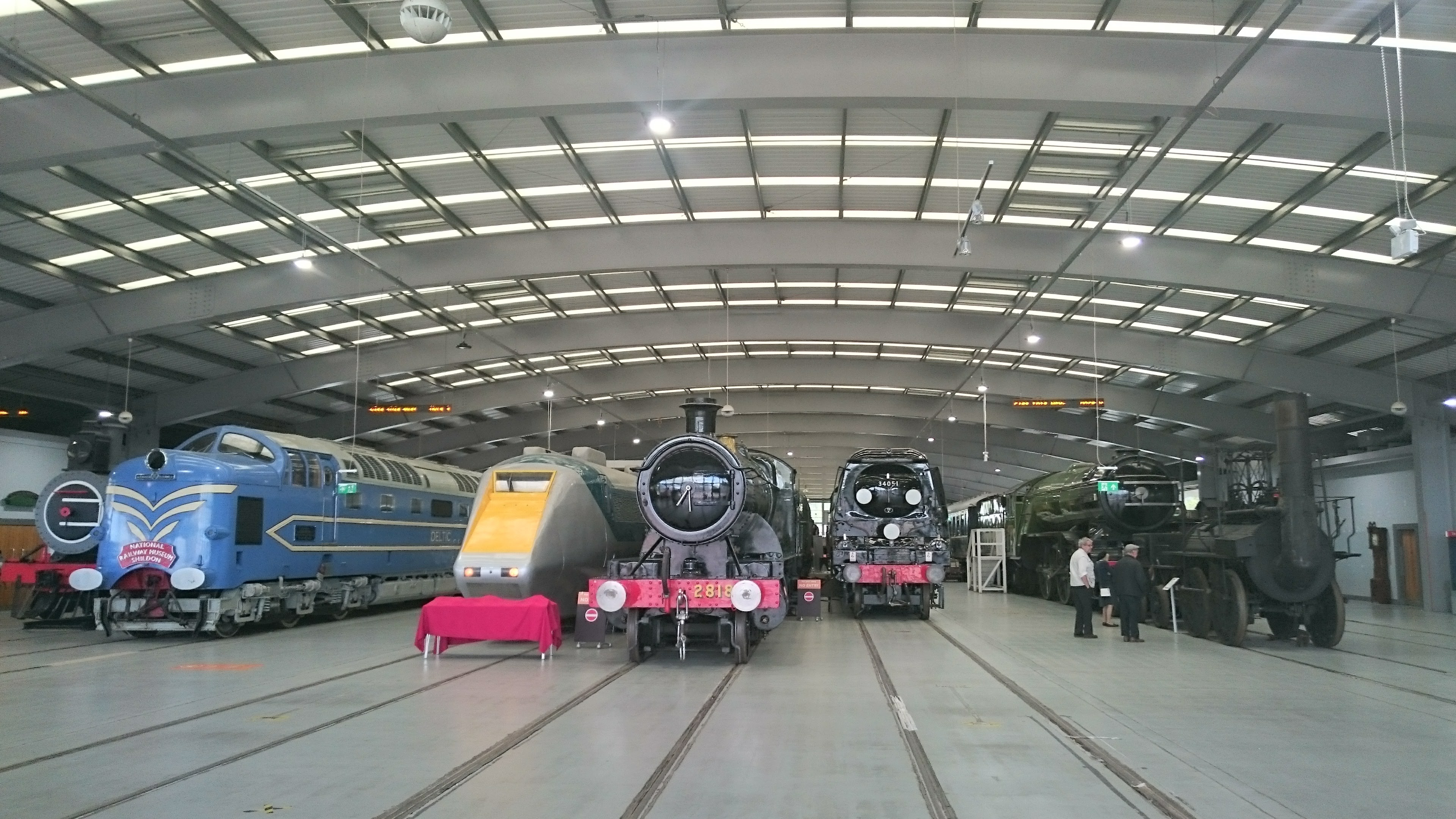
Engine Shed interior

== Exhibits ==
The museum is home to several locomotives from the National Collection, including a replica of Timothy Hackworth's Sans Pareil. The original engine, built to compete in the Rainhill Trials, is also at Shildon. The trials were to decide which engine should operate the passenger railway between Liverpool and Manchester. After a 175 years absence from the town, the locomotive was returned and is displayed in the Collection building. LNER Class A4 4468 Mallard which is usually displayed in the NRM's York museum was temporarily displayed in the museum from June 2010 to July 2011. In 2014, ahead of the 75th-anniversary celebrations for Mallard's setting the world steam speed record, 8,000 visitors turned up to welcome five sister A4 locomotives including 60008 "Dwight D Eisenhower" and 60010 "Dominion of Canada" that were repatriated from North America, the latter was given a cosmetic overhaul in Shildon's workshop.

The main exhibition building houses most of the collection and includes the sole examples of the prototype APT-E and Deltic units. The museum has a wind turbine which provides power to the National Grid and an on-site biodiesel bus for transporting visitors around the site.

Steam Locomotives
Class	Number (and name if applicable)	Livery	Image	Current Status	Additional Notes
Hunslet Austerity 0-6-0ST	3850 Juno	Green		Static	New to Stewarts & Lloyds ironstone quarries, Buckminster
SR Battle of Britain Class	34051 Winston Churchill	BR Lined Green		Static	Hauled Winston Churchill's Funeral Train
LMS Stanier Class 5 4-6-0	5000	LMS Lined Black		Static	First Black Five in class
Locomotion	S&DR 1 Locomotion	Wood lagged		Static	Original built for Stockton and Darlington Railway
Rocket	L&MR 1 Rocket	Wood lagged		Operational	Used for train rides
NER Class C1	65033	BR Black		Static (awaiting restoration)	
Sans Pareil replica	Sans Pareil	Green and Yellow painted wood		Static	
Timothy Hackworth entry for Rainhill Trials	Sans Pareil	Exposed Metal		Static	
LNWR Class G2	49395	BR Black		Static	
Hetton colliery railway locomotive	Lyon	Black		Static	
NER Class M1	1621	NER Apple Green		Static	
LNWR Improved Precedent Class	790 Hardwicke	LNWR Lined Black		Static	
Andrew Barclay fireless locomotive	Imperial No. 1	Imperial Paper Mills Green		Static	

Diesel & Electric Locomotives
Class	Number (and name if applicable)	Livery	Image	Current Status	Additional Notes	Refs
LNER Class ES1 Electric Shunter	1	NER Lined Green		Static		
British Rail Class 03 Shunter	D2090 (03090)	BR Green		Operational		
British Rail Class 08 Shunter	08911 Matey	BR Blue with NRM branding		Operational		
English Electric DP1	DP1 DELTIC	Blue with grey lining		Static	Prototype Deltic	
British Rail Class 41 (HST)	41001	Reverse BR Blue & Grey		Static (awaiting inspection)	Prototype HST power car	
British Rail Class 43 (HST)	43102	InterCity Swallow		Static	Named "The Journey Shrinker". Holds world speed record for diesel traction, arrived from East Midlands Railway	
British Rail Class 71	71001	BR Blue		Static (under restoration)		
British Rail APT-E	APT-E	Reverse BR Blue & Grey		Static	Gas Turbine One carriage has been moved elsewhere	
Sentinel Diesel-hydraulic Shunter	H001	RMS Locotec Blue		Static	New to Bass Brewery; rebuilt for CEGB, Haverton Hill	
Wickham Trolley	960209	BR Brown		Static		
Southern Railway Waterloo & City line Shunter (1898)	75S	L&SWR Salmon		Static		

Diesel & Electric Multiple Units
Class	Number (and name if applicable)	Livery	Image	Current Status	Additional Notes	Refs
British Rail Class 306	306017	BR Green with yellow warning panel		Static (awaiting restoration)		
British Rail Class 142	142001	Unbranded Northern		Operational		
British Rail Class 414	4308	Network SouthEast on one side, BR Blue and Grey the other		Static	One car inside the museum, the other out the back behind the workshop	
British Rail Class 401	2090	BR Green		Static		

Hauled Rolling Stock & Wagons
Class	Number (and name if applicable)	Livery	Image	Additional Notes	Refs
British Railways Mark 1 Brake Corridor Composite Coach	21274	BR InterCity			
BR ZZA Snow Plough	ADB 965232	Network Rail Black			
SR "Queen Mary" brake van	B56283	BR Brown		Used at museum for carrying passengers	
BR merry-go-round train HAA coal hopper wagon	350000	BR Grey		First built HAA wagon (prototype built at Darlington)	
BR merry-go-round train HAA coal hopper wagon	368459	BR Grey		Last built of 10,702 HAA wagons (built at Shildon)	
NER Snow Plough	Snow Plough No. 12	NER Brown			
Compagnie Internationale des Wagons-Lits Night Ferry Sleeping Car	3972	CIWL Blue			
High Speed Freight Vehicle	HSFV1	Grey		Basis for Class 142 chassis	
Stockton and Darlington Railway Composite Coach (1847)	59	S&DR Brown			
Stockton and Darlington Railway Composite Coach (1846)	31	S&DR Brown		Formerly displayed at Stockton station.	
'Shark' Brake Van	DB993853	Black with yellow lettering		Used at museum for carrying passengers behind Flying Scotsman	

Locomotion: visiting exhibits
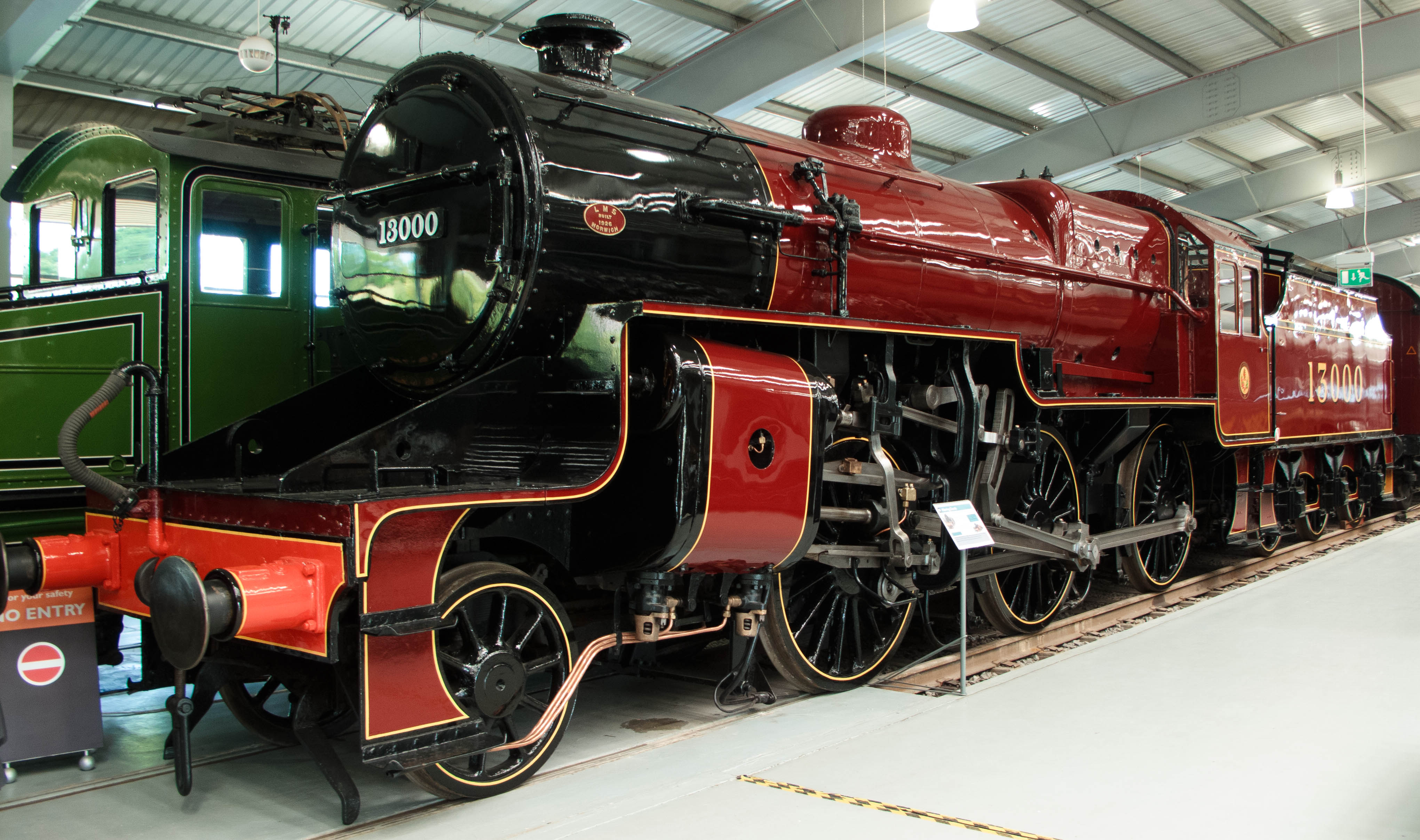
LMS Hughes Crab

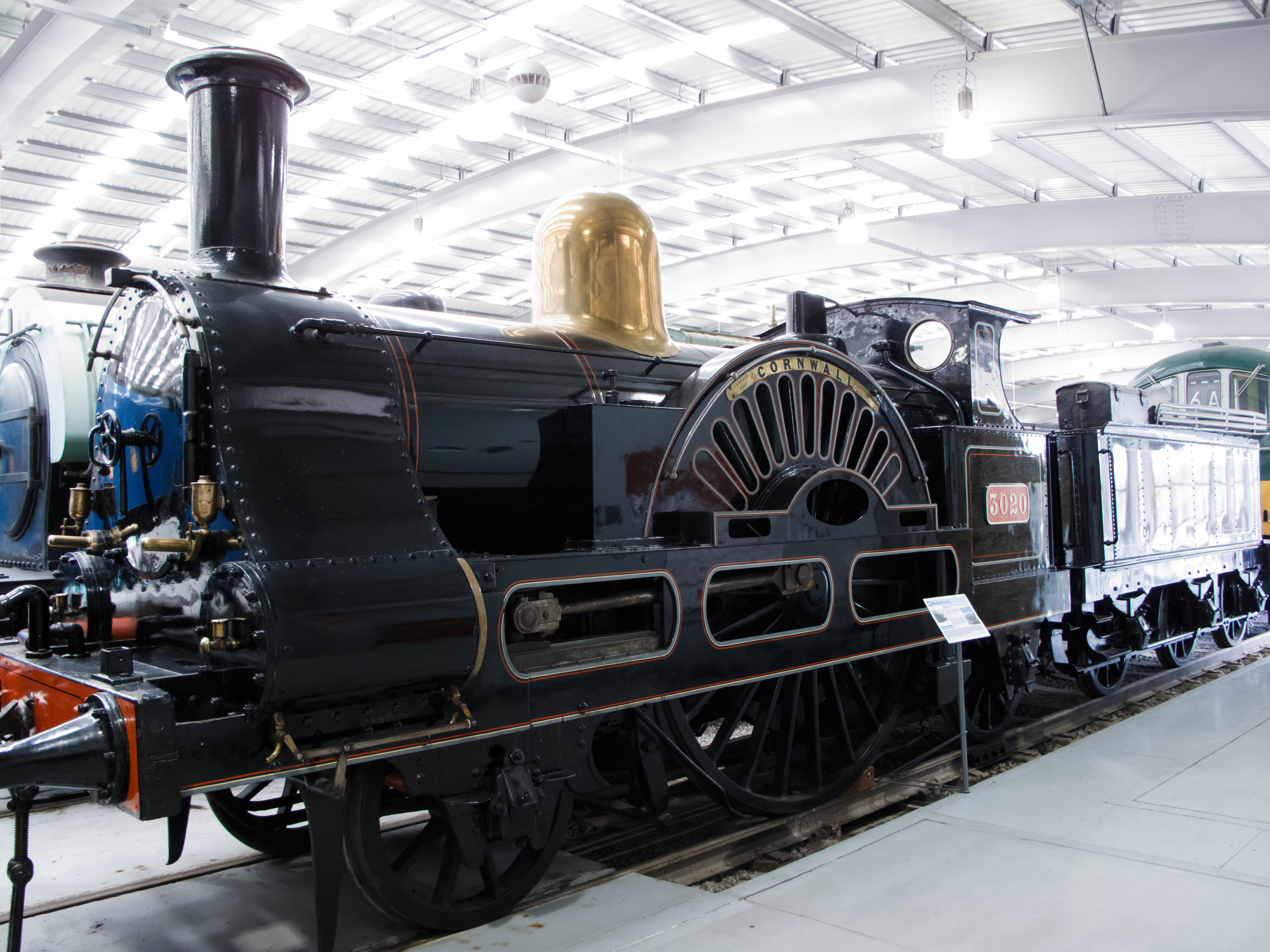
LNWR Cornwall

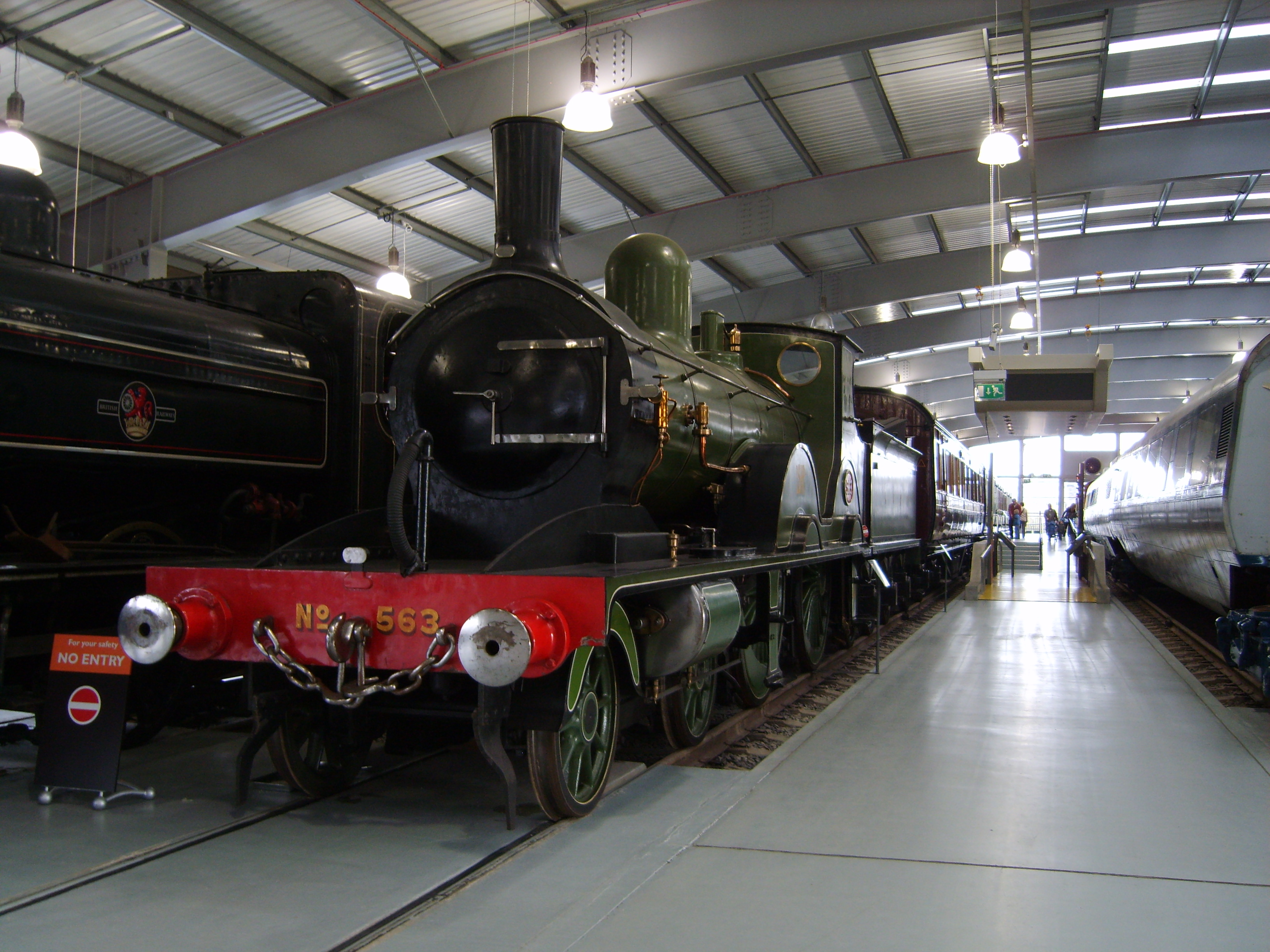
LSWR T3 class No. 563

== See also ==
- List of British railway museums
- List of transport museums
- National Museum of Railroad History & Innovation (US)
- Exporail (Canada)
- Nuremberg Transport Museum (Germany)
- Workshops Rail Museum (Australia)
