= Andrew Scott (museum director) =

British museum director

Andrew John Scott CBE, born 1949, was Director of the National Railway Museum in York, part of the National Museum of Science and Industry (NMSI) in England from 1994. His previous museum appointments (since 1984) had been with the West Yorkshire Transport Museum in Bradford, the Bradford Industrial Museum, and the London Transport Museum 1988–94. Before that he was an engineer in the public sector, having gained a BSc in Civil Engineering and an MSc in Mining Engineering, both at the University of Newcastle upon Tyne.

Scott was made a Fellow of the Museums Association (FMA). Scott was appointed a CBE in the 2006 New Year Honours List for services to museums.

In September 2009, Andrew Scott took over as acting director of the National Museum of Science and IndustryI after the dismissal of Molly Jackson over a breach of NMSI conduct. On 15 October 2010 Andrew Scott retired. The new postholder at the NMSI was Ian Blatchford. He was recruited from being the Deputy Director of the Victoria and Albert Museum. From October 2015 to 2019 Scott was the Chair of Trustees of York Civic Trust. From 2019 to 2025 he was President of York Civic Trust. He is also a Trustee of York Museums Trust. Andrew Scott is also President of the North Eastern Locomotive Preservation Group and Vice-Chair of the North Yorkshire Moors Railway.

Cultural offices
Preceded by Molly Jackson	Director of the National Museum of Science and Industry; 2009–2010	Succeeded by Ian Blatchford
