= Ian Blatchford =

British museum director (born 1965)

Sir Ian Blatchford FSA
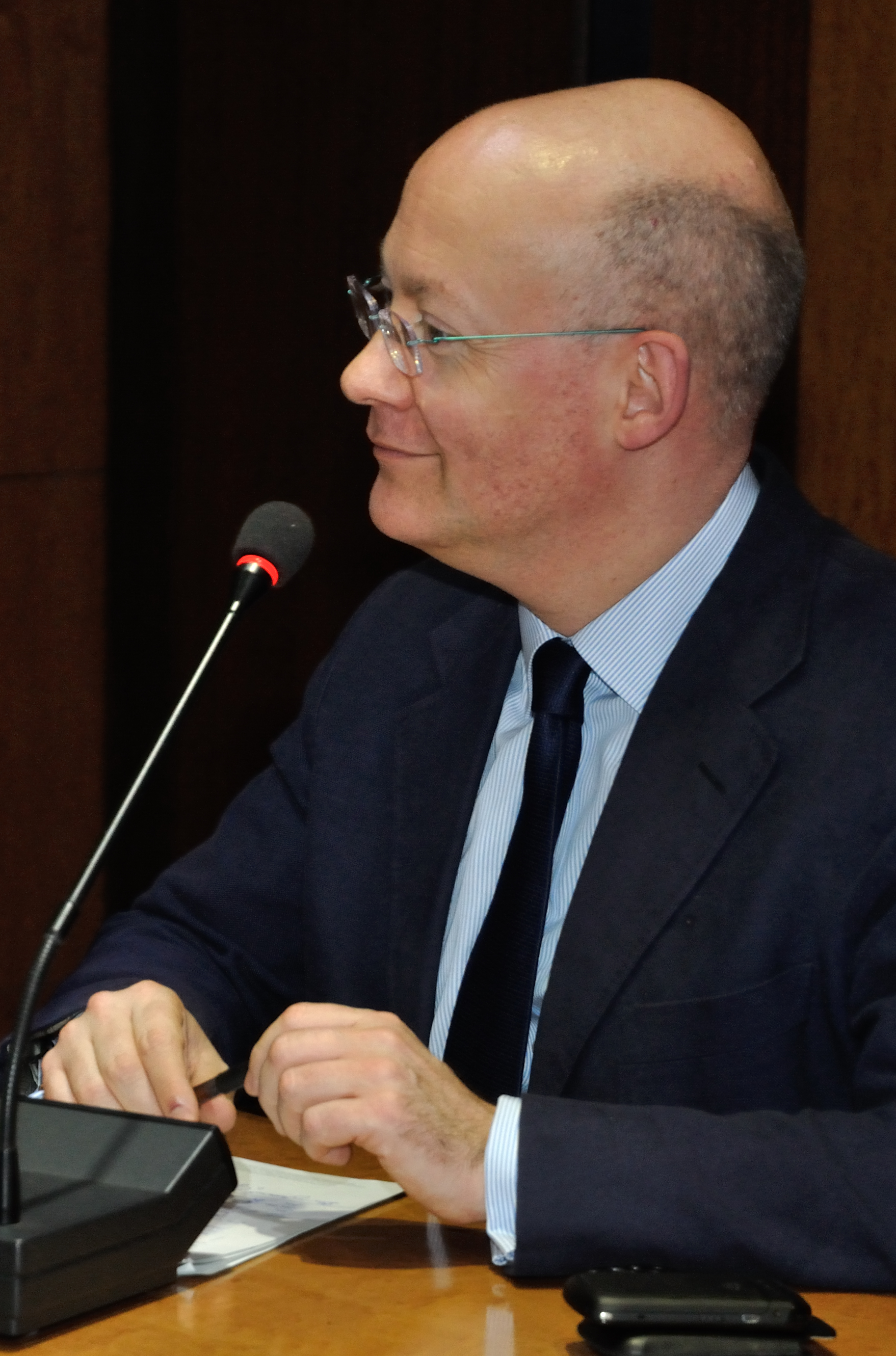
- Ian Blatchford in 2012.
- Born: Ian Craig Blatchford; 17 August 1965 (age 61)
- Education: Mansfield College, Oxford; Birkbeck, University of London
- Occupation: Museum director
- Employer(s): Bank of England; Barclays de Zoete Wedd; Royal Academy of Arts; Victoria and Albert Museum; Science Museum (London)
- Known for: Director of Science Museum Group

Sir Ian Craig Blatchford, FSA (born 17 August 1965) is the director of the Science Museum Group, which oversees the Science Museum in London, England and related museums. He was previously deputy director of the Victoria and Albert Museum.

Blatchford studied law at Mansfield College, Oxford. He also holds an MA degree in Renaissance studies at Birkbeck, University of London.

Ian Blatchford started his career working at the Bank of England and the merchant bankers Barclays de Zoete Wedd in the City of London. He then joined the Arts Council as the deputy finance director. He moved to the marketing and design agency Cricket Communications, working in the position of financial controller. In 1996. he joined the Royal Academy of Arts as the director of finance.

In April 2002, Blatchford joined the Victoria and Albert Museum as director of finance and resources. He then became deputy director in December 2004. He left to be director of the National Museum of Science and Industry in October 2010.

Blatchford is a fellow of the Chartered Institute of Management Accountants and the Society of Antiquaries (FSA). He was chairman of the governors of De Montfort University. He was appointed a Knight Bachelor in the 2019 New Year Honours for services to Cultural Education.

Blatchford was awarded a Pushkin Medal in 2015, personally presented by Vladimir Putin. He returned it in March 2022, in response to the Russian invasion of Ukraine.

Cultural offices
Preceded by Andrew Scott	Director of the Science Museum Group; 2010–present	Incumbent
