= Science Museum Group =

Group of British museums

- Abbreviation: SMG
- Named after: Science Museum
- Founded at: London
- Merger of: North Western Museum of Science; National Railway Museum; Locomotion the National Railway Museum at Shildon
- Origins: Great Exhibition
- Director: Ian Blatchford
- Chair of Board of Trustees: Timothy Laurence
- Science Director: Roger Highfield
- Main organ: Group Executive
- Publication: Science Museum Group Journal
- Website: sciencemuseumgroup.org.uk
- Formerly called: National Museum of Science and Industry

The Science Museum Group (SMG) is a consortium consisting of the Science Museum in South Kensington, London, the Science and Industry Museum (SIM) in Manchester, the National Railway Museum (NRM) in York, Locomotion in County Durham, and the National Science and Media Museum (NSMM) in Bradford. Items in the SMG's collection that are not on display are usually stored at the Science and Innovation Park (SIP) in Wroughton, Wiltshire.

== History ==
The origins of SMG lie in the internationalisation and optimism of the Great Exhibition of 1851, which enabled the foundation of the South Kensington Museum in 1857.

The term "National Museum of Science and Industry" had been in use as the Science Museum's subtitle since the early 1920s. Prior to 1 April 2012 the group was known as the National Museum of Science and Industry (NMSI).

The NSMM, formerly the National Media Museum, was established by the Science Museum in 1983. The Science Museum was run directly by HM Government until 1984, when the Board of Trustees was established and NMSI was then adopted as a corporate title for the entire organisation. At this point NMSI became a non-departmental public body under the auspices of the sponsoring government department, the Department for Culture, Media and Sport.

From January 2012 SIP became part of the SMG. From 2017 Locomotion, The National Railway Museum at Shildon, became part of the SMG.

In 2010 the Science Museum opened its climate science gallery Atmosphere which, as at April 2021, has been visited by over 5 million people. In 2021 the Science Museum also opened a temporary exhibition 'Our Future Planet' which explores the science of carbon capture. Environmental campaigners criticized the decision of SMG to appoint Shell as a major sponsor of this exhibition.

Throughout 2021 SMG hosted Climate Talks which were a series of online talks, Q&As, and events exploring problems arising from climate change. In October 2021, the SMG announced that a new climate change gallery, to be opened in 2023 at the Science Museum, would be sponsored by an arm of coal producer Adani Group.

SMG continues to work to reduce carbon emissions from operations, recruitment and supply chain, and by using resources efficiently. On 15 April 2021 SMG announced that it expects to achieve overall carbon neutrality by 2033.

== Collection ==
The SMG's collection includes:

- Alan Turing's Pilot ACE computer
- Flying Scotsman
- Charles Babbage's drawing and models
- Dorothy Hodgkin's model of penicillin
- Tim Peake's Soyuz TMA-19M spaceship
- Helen Sharman's space suit
- Winifred Penn-Gaskell's collection of stamp cards and covers
- Richard Arkwright's water frame spinning machine

Over 380,000 of the items in the SMG's collections are available to view online at its Search Our Collection web page.

== Chairman and Directors ==
The chairman of the group is Sir Timothy Laurence who was appointed by Prime Minister Rishi Sunak on 1 January 2024, succeeding Dame Mary Archer who had served from 2015.

The following have been directors of the National Museum of Science and Industry, the Science Museum and the Science Museum Group:

- Dame Margaret Weston (1973–1986)
- Sir Neil Cossons (1986–2000)
- Dr Lindsay Sharp (2000–2005)
- Prof. Martin Earwicker (2006–2007)

The following have separately been directors of the NMSI:

- Prof. Martin Earwicker (2007–2009)
- Molly Jackson (2009)
- Andrew Scott (2009–2010)
- Ian Blatchford (2010–)
