= Molly Jackson =

Molly Jackson was acting director of the National Museum of Science and Industry (NMSI) in England, from 6 April to 23 September 2009. From June 2004 she was the managing director of NMSI Trading Ltd. Prior to that (1993 to 2003) she had held a number of roles in Pearson plc, including development director of the Financial Times Group.

Jackson was the appointment panel's selection for Director on 7 April, but the appointment had not been confirmed by the time Jackson's contract was terminated following a disciplinary investigation.

She was replaced as acting director by Andrew Scott, former director of NMSI's National Railway Museum.

Cultural offices
Preceded by Martin Earwicker	Director of the National Museum of Science and Industry; 2009–2009	Succeeded by Andrew Scott
