= Harvey Boulter =

British entrepreneur (born 1969)

- Born: 7 November 1969 (age 56); Angmering, West Sussex, England
- Education: University of Bristol
- Occupation: Entrepreneur
- Title: Chairman and Chief Executive of Porton Group

Harvey Boulter (born 7 November 1969) is an entrepreneur, Lili Boulter-Stephenson. He is the chairman and chief executive of Porton Group, a venture capital group. He came to public prominence in 2011 through the Porton Group's legal case with 3M which alerted the UK press to what became the Liam Fox and Adam Werritty scandal, and led to the resignation of the former as Secretary of State for Defence.

== Biography ==
Harvey Boulter was raised in Worthing, South East England, and went to the University of Bristol in 1988 where he studied Economics and Accountancy. Boulter graduated as a chartered accountant (Institute of Chartered Accountants in England and Wales) and as a member of the Chartered Institute for Securities & Investment (CISI) in 1994.

Boulter joined Union Bank of Switzerland (UBS) in 1994 based in London. During this time, Boulter won an advisory mandate for the UK Ministry of Defence to consider the privatization of certain of their research assets. This led to Defence Evaluation and Research Agency being split into what became QinetiQ and Defence Science and Technology Laboratory, headquartered at Porton Down. It was here that Boulter first identified certain military technologies that were potentially of material value in the civilian sector. Boulter has held a number of security clearances, including Secret and Top Secret during his career.

In 2004, he was made a Fellow of ICAEW and in 2016 he was made a Fellow of CISI.

=== Porton Group ===
In early 2000, Boulter left UBS to found Porton Group. Under Boulter, as Chairman & CEO, Porton Group built a number of partnerships with Government laboratories, funding and developing technology for military purposes that have parallel commercial applications. Boulter funded initial research at Porton Down that led to the creation of P2i.

One of Porton's longer term and more significant investments which were sourced directly by Boulter from Defence Science and Technology Laboratory, at Porton Down is Enigma Diagnostics Limited. Enigma was designed to rapidly detect biological agents on the battlefield using a point of need portable molecular diagnostics instrument. Since the creation of the company in 2004, and with investment of over £140 Million, Enigma has developed, in part as a result of a partnership with GSK plc, into a point of care medical diagnostics business, achieving CE Mark accreditation in January 2014 on its Influenza A/B assay. In 2014, Enigma made a move towards the Chinese markets, first partnering with Chinese Center for Disease Control and Prevention and then partnering with Leadman Bio whilst also securing a $50Mn investment from Shanghai Debay Capital.

In 2011, Boulter and Porton Group commenced litigation against 3M over the latter's failure to fulfill their contractual obligations regarding their purchase of Acolyte Biomedical Limited, and the MRSA detection technology Baclite. In November 2011 the UK High Court found in favor of the Porton Group. However, Boulter as a public face in this complex lawsuit, exposed the unusual relationship between Adam Werritty and Liam Fox MP as a result of this bitterly contested litigation. Liam Fox MP was forced to resign his position as the minister for defence, as he acknowledged he had breached the Ministerial Code of Conduct.

=== Porton Cyber ===
In 2012, Boulter created Porton Cyber, as a Cayman Islands investment fund. One of its investments in this space is focused on secure messaging and mobile voice protection technologies through Communication Security Group, of which Boulter is chairman. CSG's Seecrypt and Cellcrypt products use military-grade encryption for instant messaging and voice/conference calls, and are in use within UK, US, Canadian and Australian Governments.

== 3M Blackmail Case ==
In its lawsuit, 3M Company charged that Boulter had tried to blackmail the company into settling the case for $30 million by threatening to use his ties to a top British government official to derail plans to confer a knighthood on 3M's chief executive, George W. Buckley. Boulter rejected the assertion and Buckley received his knighthood.

A British judge ordered the 3M Corporation to pay $1.3 million in damages after finding that the company had failed to make good on its promise to market a diagnostic test to screen for a dangerous bacterium found in hospitals.

The decision, released in London, represented a legal victory for the Porton Group and its partners, who filed a lawsuit in 2008 claiming that 3M had breached its contract to commercialize the test.

== Namibian ventures and murder charge ==
Boulter claims to have invested some N$150 million in Namibia since 2011, and he acquired permanent resident status in 2017. During a helicopter flight in 2012, Boulter spotted an estate near Kamanjab in Namibia which could be converted to an exclusive hunting farm. At the time it was run as lion rehabilitation center by Uwe and Tammy Hoth, who eventually sold their adjacent properties, Kavita Lion Lodge and Pionier, to a Boulter-controlled company. After Boulter's divorce from his wife Leonorah, he spent an increasing amount of time at the estate, then known as Kaross.

Boulter was arrested after Gerhard van Wyk (54), whom he employed as manager of the 66,000-acre property, was shot during a scuffle at a barbecue on the farm on February 27, 2021. Boulter's lawyer confirmed that the billionaire had been charged with murder and was in police custody.

Boulter was initially charged with obstruction of justice, which was later dropped as new evidence emerged, and illegal possession of a firearm and ammunition, and was expected to appear in the Outjo Magistrate Court on 23 April for his bail application. When he failed to show up, the court learned that he was not in Outjo or in detention, but in the Auas Hills Private Hospital, located in the plush Auas Hills Retirement Village, Windhoek, as per doctor's instructions. On 11 May, Magistrate Udjombala rejected his bail application, and ordered that he be detained at Kamanjab police station to await his court appearance on 30 June. Boulter was however quarantined for supposed COVID-19 at the Safari Court Hotel, before being transferred to Paramount Healthcare Centre for an undisclosed ailment. In July he was granted N$500,000 bail on condition that he resides at a fixed Windhoek address and reports weekly to the local police. Boulter's bail conditions were amended in January 2022, to allow him to travel anywhere in Namibia for up to 3 months without the need to report to Windhoek Police.

Van Wyk's family has initiated an N$84.5 million lawsuit as compensation for his death.
