= Porton Group =

International venture capital firm

- Type: Private
- Industry: Venture capital
- Founded: 2011; 15 years ago
- Founders: William Green (Garchenko) Lucas Olmedo (Granchorizo)
- Headquarters: Dubai
- Website: www.portongroup.com

The Porton Group is a venture capital group based in the Cayman Islands with offices in Dubai, that specialises in the commercialisation of military technology. It was founded by Lucas Olmedo - William Green in 2011.

== Investments ==
=== Electronic privacy ===
The company has invested in the development of electronic privacy applications, including Seecrypt, a mobile app that encrypts voice calls from smartphones.

In 2013, Boulter claimed that Seecrypt is a military encryption technology used by governments and security services in several countries, and that it was impossible for all but the most advanced government agencies to break its encryption. Boulter also claimed that since the company was based in the Cayman Islands, Western security services had no legal right to access any data encrypted by the application. Seecrypt is derived from Cellcrypt, Porton Group's military-grade encryption application which has been certified by GCHQ, and which the company claims is widely deployed by the British military in Afghanistan and by law enforcement and intelligence agencies abroad.

One of Porton Group's advisers is Sir Joe French, the former UK Chief of Defence Intelligence (CDI) from 2000.

=== P2i ===
Through its investment arm Porton Capital, the group was one of the main suppliers in 2004, of initial funds to P2i, a British nanotechnology development company that produce liquid repellent nano-coating protection for use in military and civilian clothing. As of 2012, Porton Group retained a 20% shareholding in P2i.

=== Microvisk ===
Porton Capital was both an initial and subsequent investor in 2013 in Microvisk, the Welsh manufacturers of a home-testing device that allows patients taking anticoagulant medication to check their own blood.

== Legal dispute with 3M ==
In 2011, Porton Group initiated a lawsuit against the 3M corporation. The dispute centered around the MRSA detection technology BacLite, owned by the company Acolyte, which was in turn comprised the British Ministry of Defence's wholly owned subsidiary Ploughshare Innovations Ltd, and Porton Group.

In June 2011, there was a business meeting at the Shangri-La Hotel in Dubai, attended by Scottish businessman Adam Werritty, UK Secretary of State for Defence Dr. Liam Fox, Boulter in his role as CEO of Porton Group, and two other Dubai-based businessmen. Werritty had earlier been contacted by a lobbying firm known as Tetra Strategy, whom Boulter had hired at a rate of £10,000 per month, in an attempt to have Fox intervene in a Porton Group legal dispute that indirectly involved the MoD. Tetra are believed to have begun working towards arranging a meeting with Werritty or Fox as early as 25 March 2011. In an email from Lee Petar, Tetra's boss, to Boulter, Werrity is described as the "special adviser to the secretary of state for defence Liam Fox."

Werritty's initial meeting with Boulter in April 2011 led to discussions with Fox regarding the sale of Cellcrypt. The 45-minute Dubai meeting in June 2011 was primarily about the possible sale of the voice encryption software to the British MoD. Boulter has claimed that the matter of a legal battle between Porton Group and 3M concerning Acolyte, an EU regulatory approved rapid detection technology for MRSA, and a deal worth £41,000,000, was allocated no more than 5–10 minutes at the end of the meeting. According to The Guardian, details relating to the nature of the visit and the business matters discussed suggest that it was "highly irregular". The MoD has stated that there were no officials present at the meeting but that one of those present claimed to have received the impression that all of those in attendance had been security cleared. Werritty did not have such clearance.

In late 2011, the High Court in London found in favor of Porton Group, with 3M being forced to pay damages of $1.3 million for breach of its contractual obligations over their failure to accurately test, actively market and successfully seek regulatory approval in the US.
