= Kastus =

Irish nanotechnology company

- Industry: Biotechnology
- Founded: 2014
- Founder: John Browne
- Headquarters: Dublin, Republic of Ireland
- Area served: Worldwide
- Products: Antimicrobial solutions
- Website: kastus.com

Kastus Technologies is an Irish nanotechnology company based in Dublin.

== History ==
John Browne founded Kastus in 2014 in Dublin following 10 years of collaborative research with Dublin Institute of Technology. It was developed out of an increasing demand for a reduction in the spread of antibiotic-resistant infections commonly found on indoor surfaces. In October 2017, the Department of Health published “Ireland’s National Action Plan on Antimicrobial Resistance 2017-2020”, which highlighted the threat antimicrobial resistance poses and the urgent need for new technology to combat this.

In April 2016, the Sligo Institute of Technology, which is funded by Kastus, announced the creation of a non-toxic antimicrobial nanotechnology, which Kastus plans to market globally. This research is supported by a €1.5 million funding investment from Atlantic Bridge.

In 2018, Kastus partnered with Oman-based ceramic tile producer Al Maha Ceramics, which exports to 15 countries in Asia and Africa. The deal saw Kastus use its antimicrobial technology to produce a range of new tiles called iProtect.

In 2020, Kastus developed antimicrobial and antiviral technology used on touch screens to prevent the spread of diseases such as COVID-19. Kastus was awarded EU funding to further develop and expand these technologies and their applications, and has partnered with companies such as Lenovo,

In 2021, Kastus raised €5.65 million in a Series A round to build out its global commercial team to meet growing demand for its antiviral surface protection technology.

== Awards ==
- Spin-out Company Impact Award (2017)
- Irish Times Innovation of the Year award (2017)
- Irish Times Life Sciences and Healthcare award (2017)
- KTI Impact Award Winners 2017
- Med Tech Award Finalists 2020
- EY Entrepreneur of The Year Finalists
