= Sharpies Golf House Sign =

Heritage-listed advertising sign in Sydney, Australia

Coordinates: 33.88051°S 151.20902°E

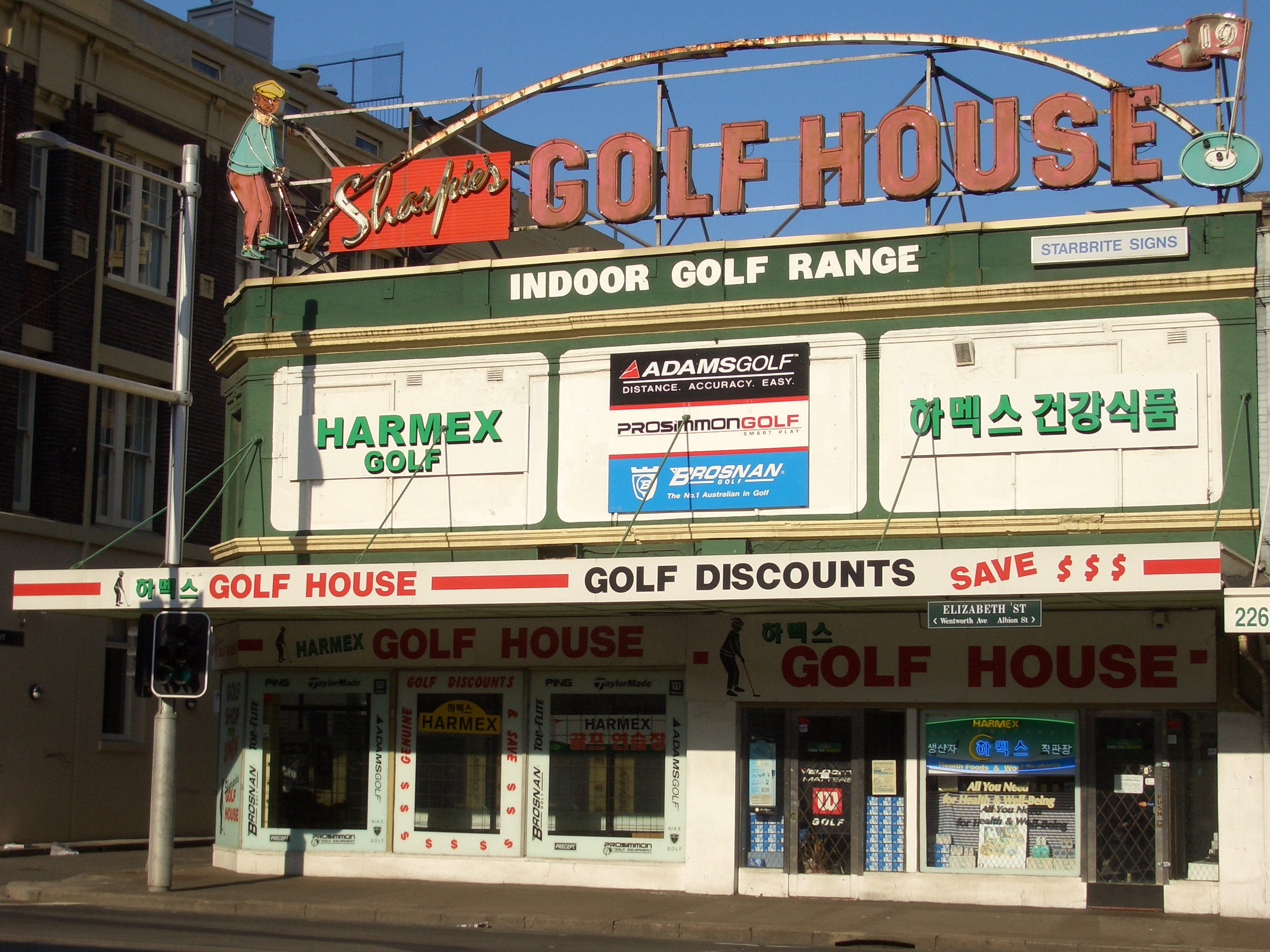
- The sign in its original location in 2006

- Location within Sydney Location within Australia
- Location: Powerhouse Museum collection

History
- Built: 1958–1964

Site notes
- Architect: Ron Ries

New South Wales Heritage Register
- Official name: Sharpies Golf House Sign (The Golf House); The Golf House
- Type: state heritage (built)
- Designated: 1 November 2002
- Reference no.: 1655
- Type: Advertising Sign
- Category: Recreation and Entertainment
- Builders: Consolidated Neon (later Claude Neon)

The Sharpies Golf House Sign is a heritage-listed neon animated advertising sign in Sydney, Australia. It was built from 1958 to 1964 by Consolidated Neon (later Claude Neon), and sat atop a golfing business at 216 – 220 Elizabeth Street, Surry Hills from 1964 to 2007. It was subsequently taken down and donated to the Powerhouse Museum. It was added to the New South Wales State Heritage Register on 1 November 2002.

== History ==
Neon gas was first discovered by William Ramsay and Morris Travers in 1898 in London. Neon signs such as the Sharpies Golf House sign are the result of French engineer and chemist, Georges Claude. In 1902 Georges and his French company Claude applied an electric discharge to a sealed tube of neon gas to create a neon lamp. By 1923, Claude Neon had introduced neon gas signs to the United States; however, neon reached its height of popularity in the 1940s and 1950s with many colourful designs that advertised a huge range of products.

The Golf House grew out of a pawn shop run by Russian immigrant, Harry Landis who arrived in Sydney via Broken Hill in 1917. In 1918, Landis purchased the Railway Loan Office at 226 Elizabeth Street, Surry Hills where he opened a pawnshop. In 1923 he moved the pawnshop into 220–222 Elizabeth Street, where two of Harry's sons entered the business, Harry Jr. and Jack. The pawn shop became divided into two main sections, musical instruments, run by Harry Jr. and sporting goods, particularly golf equipment run by Jack. After WWII military service, Jack Landis established the Golf House. Harry Landis Sr. died in 1953 and the shop was divided between the two sons.

The Golf House sign was built between 1958 & 1964 by Consolidated Neon, which became Claude Neon, who owned and maintained the sign which they leased to the Golf House. Ron Ries, an employee at Consolidated Neon for over 50 years remembers how the Golf House sign was designed and drawn out on a blackboard in fluorescent paint. It was then sized and priced and taken out for the signing of a contract. Ron Ries then took out the drawings for approval at the Council Health and Building Department and when the approval was granted, he supervised the construction of the sign. It was first laid out in full size on a brown paper pattern in the layout room. The pattern was then used to make the steel skeleton, which had a front return and a back to enclose and waterproof the electrics. The neon tubes and globes were attached to the skeleton. The sign won the Outdoor Advertising Association award for the best sign in 1964.

In 1977 Harry Landis Jnr moved his music business to Park Street, leaving The Golf House as the sole occupant. In 1978 he sold The Golf House to his son Rob, who worked in the business and had two investor partners. While the shop was the premier golf store in Sydney, it relied to a great extent on the second hand trade and new equipment was increasingly being made more cheaply in Taiwan and elsewhere. It became uneconomical to buy and refurbish old golf clubs. In 1985 Rob Landis and his partners sold the stock and the half-share in the building to professional golfer, Lindsay Sharp, while retaining the name. Lindsay was unwilling to pay the price asked for the goodwill and renamed the business Sharpies Golf House. The sign had to be changed to Sharpies Golf House by Claude Neon because Lindsay did not own the original name. Lindsay Sharp is known for his sporting efforts as he was the first professional to win the newly introduced National Ambrose competition in Australia.

In 1996 Lindsay Sharp sold the half-share in the premises and in 1999 he sold the business to Ray Drummond, who has a number of golf stores (Nevada Bob's Golf Shops). In 2002, Claude Neon, the owners of the sign, proposed to take it down on the basis that it had become unsafe. The announcement was controversial, and led to an agreement whereby ownership of the sign was transferred to Sharpies Golf House on the condition that it be donated to the City of Sydney at the conclusion of the lease. It was listed on the State Heritage Register in 2002, at which time it was noted that it was in a "perilous condition".

Sharpies Golf House closed in 2004, and the new owners of the building sought to donate it to the Powerhouse Museum, but met with opposition from the NSW Heritage Office. The City of Sydney ordered its removal in 2007 on safety grounds. It was stored in the building for several years, and was eventually transferred to the museum in 2014 after agreements were reached between the council, heritage office and the museum. The former building on which the sign had sat was demolished c. 2016–17.

== Description ==
The Sharpies Golf House sign is a skeleton sign made of steel angle with a return and a back to enclose the electrics. The sign is composed of a figure hitting a golf ball in an arc over the words "SHARPIES GOLF HOUSE". The sign has approximately 80 neon tubes bent and attached. The letters of the sign are approximately 14m long by 1.5m high. The elements consist of the golfer, the club in three positions, the ball, with a metal track and a chaser of about 48 globes, the hole and the flag. The flag on the sign shows the number 19, referring to the golfing reference of the "19th hole" as the clubhouse after a round.

In 1985, Claude Neon Pty Ltd changed the name on the sign from "The Golf House" to "Sharpies Golf House".

== Condition ==
At the time of its heritage listing in 2002, the sign continued to function, but the structure of the sign was in very poor condition. Parts of the curved upper section and the bases of the letters had already corroded to the point that pieces have broken away. The curved lightweight metal top member with external light bulbs was severely rusted along its base. Some places had already fallen from the structure. The pan letters of the sign were severely corroded along their bases. Some pieces of this section of the sign had fallen from the structure. Although the fixing bolts of the letters are in reasonable condition, there is an immediate risk that other places may fall. Some nuts and bolts on the rear support trusses are corroded to the point where they no longer exist. There is corrosion in the gussett plates and in other areas, though not severe. The rear beam is severely corroded at top and bottom flange slice plates.

Although there is some corrosion of metal elements, the sign can still demonstrate its significance. It was agreed at the time of its donation to the Powerhouse Museum that any inclusion of the sign in a new development on the original site would require a copy sign, and that the original would remain in the museum.

== Heritage listing ==
Sharpies Golf Sign was listed on the New South Wales State Heritage Register on 1 November 2002 as a unique example of 20th century advertising, being the nly original animated neon sign remaining in situ and is representative of the animated neon sign phase during the 1950s.
