= Deian Hopkin =

Welsh historian and academic administrator

Sir Deian Hopkin

Vice-Chancellor of the London South Bank University
- In office 2001–2009
- Succeeded by: Professor Martin Earwicker

Personal details
- Born: Deian Rhys Hopkin; 1 March 1944 (age 82) Llanelli, Wales
- Education: Aberystwyth University

Sir Deian Rhys Hopkin (born 1 March 1944) is an academic and historian, former vice chancellor and former President of the National Library of Wales. From 2013 to 2020, he served as Chair of Wales Remembers 1914-1918 and was expert adviser to the First Minister of Wales for the Centenary of the First World War. Hopkin was from 2001 until 2009 vice-chancellor and chief executive of London South Bank University, England. From 2011 to 2015, he was president of the National Library of Wales. He is a historian, originally from Wales and a fluent Welsh speaker.

== Early life and education ==
Born and educated in Llanelli, Deian Hopkin attended the first Welsh-medium school to be established by a local authority, followed by a scholarship to Llandovery College. He graduated in history at the University of Wales, Aberystwyth where he also completed his PhD.

== Career ==
After a brief period at Queen Mary College, London, he returned to the department of history at Aberystwyth, where he taught for 24 years and became head of department. For most of that time, he was also a tutor at the Open University and was seconded to the OU to develop new courses. In 1991, he was appointed dean of human sciences at City of London Polytechnic, which became, in 1992, London Guildhall University (now London Metropolitan University). He was promoted to vice-provost in 1996.

Hopkin has been actively involved in educational policy and, in particular, the skills agenda of the UK over a number of years. He was a council member of the City and Guilds of London Institute, and the Campaign for Learning. He was a patron of Hillcroft College for Women and was previously chairman-emeritus of the University Centre, Jersey; Highlands College. He was co-chair of the HE Progression Board for the Department for Children, Schools and Families and HE Champion for the 14–19 Diploma.

He was for twenty years, until 2023, a trustee of the Council for At-Risk Academics (formerly CARA) of which he was vice-chairman and was until 2009 Chairman of the UNIAID Foundation, the national charity supporting students in financial difficulty which has now merged with the Brightside Trust.

Hopkin has published on Labour and press history and on the use of computers in history, and was co-founder of the Association for History and Computing and founding editor of Llafur, The Journal of Welsh People's History, of which he is now a vice-president. He is a member of the Higher Education Commission.

He was a trustee of the Institute of Historical Research Development Trust, University of London, and was a member of the editorial advisory board of Times Higher Education. He is a judge of the annual Times Higher Awards. He has extensive broadcasting experience and was a member of the BBC General Advisory Council.

Hopkin is a Fellow of the Royal Historical Society and the Royal Society of Arts and is a Freeman of the City of London, a Liveryman and trustee of the Worshipful Company of Educators and a Fellow of the Learned Society of Wales Learned Society of Wales. He has been elected an honorary Fellow of the University of Wales, Aberystwyth and of the University of Wales Trinity Saint David, has an honorary D.Litt. from Glamorgan University, an honorary LL.D. from McGill University, Montreal, Canada and an honorary D.Univ. from the Open University.

In November 2017 he was awarded an honorary D.Litt. by the University of London. He is also an honorary Fellow of the Chartered Institution of Building Services Engineers and has been awarded a Fellowship of the City and Guilds of London Institute. He was knighted in the 2009 Birthday Honours for services to higher education and skills. In 2019, he was awarded the First Minister of Wales' Special Award at the annual St David Award. In 2022 he was elected President of the Honourable Society of Cymmrodorion In 2024 he was elected a Fellow of the Learned Society of Wales and elected to the Council of the Society in 2026.

In 2009, Hopkin was appointed interim vice-chancellor of the University of East London and in 2010 was appointed interim chair of the Student Loans Company. In 2017 he was a founding partner of executive search company, Anderson Quigley, and from 2020-23 a Principal Advisor at [https://wellsadvisory.co Wells Advisory of Melbourne.

== Selected publications ==
- Denley, Peter, Deian Hopkin. History and Computing. Manchester: Manchester University Press, 1987. ISBN 0719024846
- Hopkin, Deian, Tanner, Duncan and Williams, Chris. The Labour Party in Wales: 1900–2000. Cardiff: University of Wales Press, 2001. ISBN 0708317197
- Hopkin, Deian. The role of universities in the modern economy = Swyddogaeth prifysgolion yn yr economi fodern. Cardiff: Welsh Academic Press, 2002. ISBN 1860570763

Academic offices
Preceded by Gerald Bernbaum	Vice-chancellor and chief executive of London South Bank University; 2001–2009	Succeeded by Martin John Earwicker
