= Nanotechnology in warfare =

Branch of nanoscience

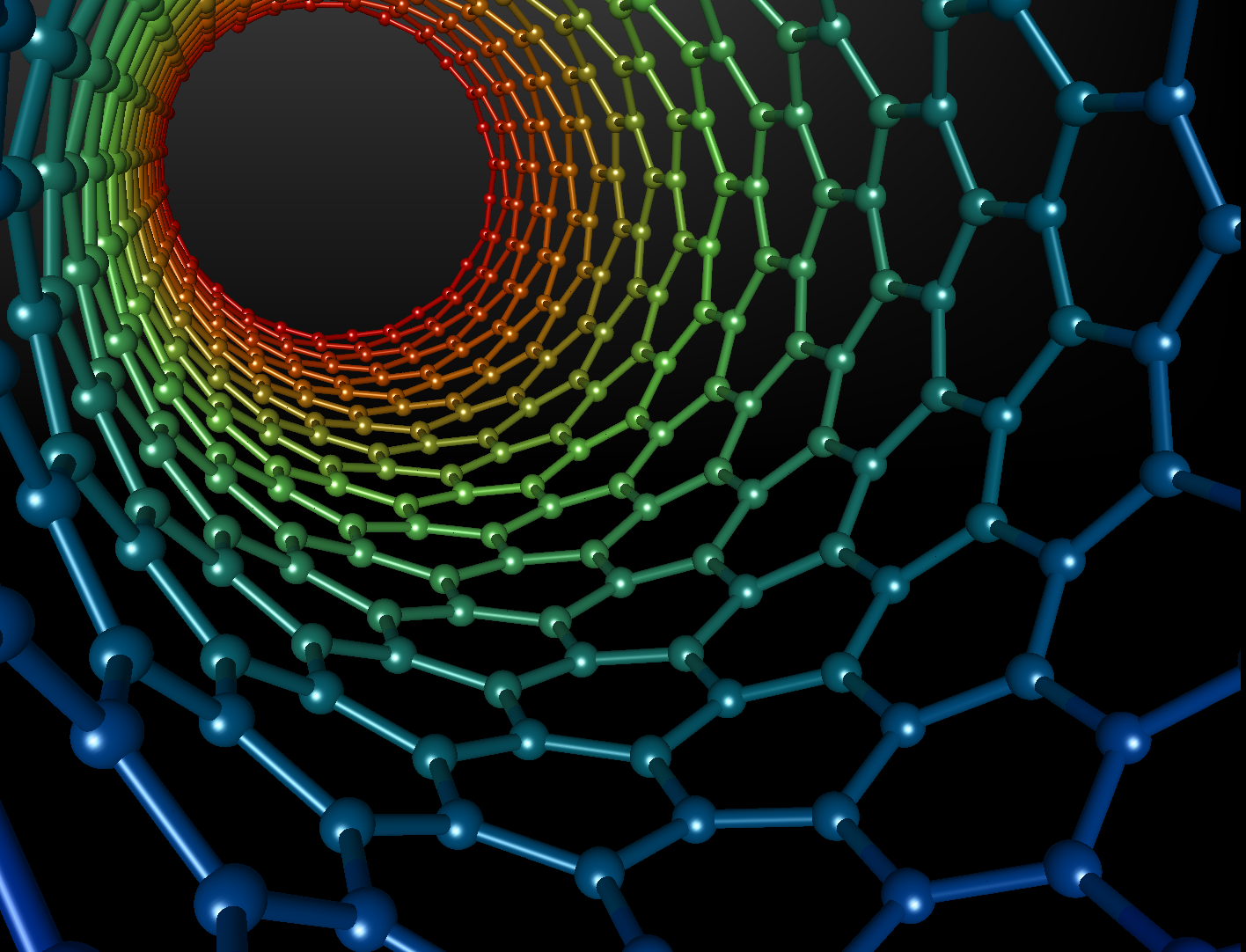
Single-walled Carbon Nanotube, consisting of a graphite sheet wrapped into a cylinder shape.

Nanotechnology in warfare is a branch of nano-science in which molecular systems are designed, produced and created to fit a nano-scale (1-100 nm). The application of such technology, specifically in the area of warfare and defense, has paved the way for future research in the context of weaponization. Nanotechnology unites a variety of scientific fields, including; Material Science, Chemistry, Physics, Biology and Engineering.

Advancements in this area, have led to categorized development of such nano-weapons with classifications varying from; small robotic machines, hyper-reactive explosives, and electromagnetic super-materials. With this technological growth, has emerged implications of associated risks and repercussions, as well as regulation to combat these effects. These impacts give rise to issues concerning global security, the safety of society, and the environment. Nanotechnology has the ability to dramatically escalate the destructive capacity of preexisting weaponry. Legislation may need to be constantly monitored to keep up with the dynamic growth and development of nano-science, due to the potential benefits or dangers of its use. Anticipation of such impacts through regulation, would 'prevent irreversible damages' of implementing defense related nanotechnology in warfare.

== Origins ==
Historical use of nanotechnology in the area of warfare and defense has been rapid and expansive. Over the past two decades, numerous countries have funded military applications of this technology including; China, United Kingdom, Russia, and most notably the United States. The US government has been considered a national leader of research and development in this area, however now rivalled by international competition as appreciation of nanotechnology's eminence increases. Therefore, the growth of this area in the use of its power has a dominant platform in the front line of military interests.

=== U.S. National Nanotechnology Initiative ===
In 2000, the United States government developed a National Nanotechnology Initiative to focus funding towards the development of nano-science and its technology, with a heavy focus on utilizing the potential of nano-weapons. This initial US proposal has now grown to coordinate application of nanotechnology in numerous defence programs, as well as all military factions including Air Force, Army and Navy. From the financial year 2001 through to 2014, the US government contributed around $19.4 billion to nano-science, moreover the development and manufacturing of nano-weapons for military defence. The 21st Century Nanotechnology Research and Development Act (2003), envisions the United States continuing its leadership in the field of nanotechnology through national collaboration, productivity and competitiveness, to maintain this dominance.

==== Developments ====
Successful transitions of nanotechnology into defence products:

- Lifetime of material coatings increased from hours to years, however further development continuing (see below).
- Nano-structured silicate manipulation reducing insulation weight by 980 lbs.
- High Power Microwave (HPM) devices with reduced weight, shape and power consumption.

The United States government has had military purposed development of nanotechnology at the forefront of its national budget and policy throughout the Clinton and Bush administrations, with the Department of Defense planning to continue with this priority throughout the 21st century. In response to America's assertive public funding of defence purposed nanotechnology, numerous global actors have since created similar programmes.

=== China ===
In the sub-category of nano materials, China secures second place behind the United States in the amount of research publications they have released. Conjecture stands over the purpose of China's quick development to rival the U.S., with 1/5 of their government budget spent on research (US$337million). In 2018, Tsinghua University, Beijing, released their findings where they have enhanced carbon nanotubes to now withstand the weight of over 800 tonnes, requiring just 1$cm^3$of material. The scientific nanotechnology team hinted at aerospace, and armour boosting applications, showing promise for defence related nano-weapons. The Chinese Academy of Science's Vice President Chunli Bai, has stated the need to focus on closing the gap between "basic research and application," in order for China to advance its global competitiveness in nanotechnology.

Between 2001 and 2004, approximately 60 countries globally implemented national nanotechnology programmes. According to R.D Shelton, an international technology assessor, research and development in this area "has now become a socio-economic target...an area of intense international collaboration and competition." As of 2017, data showed 4725 patents published in USPTO by the USA alone, maintaining their position as a leader in nanotechnology for over 20 years.

== Current research ==
Most recent research into military nanotechnological weapons includes production of defensive military apparatus, with objectives of enhancing existing designs of lightweight, flexible and durable materials. These innovative designs are equipped with features to also enhance offensive strategy through sensing devices and manipulation of electromechanical properties.

=== Soldier battlesuit ===
The Institute for Soldier Nanotechnologies (ISN), deriving from a partnership between the United States Army and MIT, provided an opportunity to focus funding and research activities purely on developing armour to increase soldier survival. Each of seven teams produces innovative enhancements for different aspects of a future U.S. soldier bodysuit. These additional characteristics include energy-absorbing material protecting from blasts or ammunition shocks, engineered sensors to detect chemicals and toxins, as well as built in nano devices to identify personal medical issues such as haemorrhages and fractures. This suit would be made possible with advanced nano-materials such as carbon nanotubes woven into fibres, allowing strengthened structural capacities and flexibility, however preparation becomes an issue due to inability to use automated manufacturing.

=== Adaptive concealment and stealth ===
With the use of nanoparticles, it is evidently possibly to procure "invisible" suits for soldiers that will act as the ultimate camouflage. This possibility is rooted from the fact that objects are only visible due to how light reflects off of them. Therefore, if the particle is smaller than the wavelength of the light, it is not visible. Visible light wavelengths fall within the range of 300-700 nanometers. In order to achieve this invisible cloak, the particles that make up the suit should be varying in size. Another approach for concealment includes cloaks that act as a chameleon. Instead of being completely invisible, this nanoparticle coated cloak adapts to any colors surrounding it in order to blend in.

=== Enhanced materials ===
Creation of sol-gel ceramic coatings has protected metals from; wear, fractures and moisture, allowing adjustability to numerous shapes and sizes, as well as aiding "materials that cannot withstand high temperature". Current research focuses on resolving durability issues, where stress cracks between the coating and material set limitations on its use and longevity. The drive for this research is finding more efficient and cost effective uses in application of nanotechnology for Airforce and Navy military groups. Integration of fibre-reinforced nano-materials in structural features, such as missile casings, can limit overheating, increase reliability, strength and ductility of the materials used for such nanotechnology.

=== Communication devices ===
Nanotechnology designed for advanced communication is expected to equip soldiers and vehicles with micro antenna rays, tags for remote identification, acoustic arrays, micro GPS receivers and wireless communication. Nanotech facilitates easier defence related communications due to lower energy consumption, light weight, efficiency of power, as well as smaller and cheaper to manufacture. Specific military uses of this technology include aerospace applications such as; solid oxide fuel cells to provide three times the energy, surveillance cameras on microchips, performance monitors, and cameras as light as 18g.

=== Mini-nukes ===
The United States, along with countries such as Russia and Germany, are sing the convenience of small nanotechnologies, adhering it to nuclear "mini-nuke" explosive devices. This weapon would weigh 5 lbs, with the force of 100 tonnes of TNT, giving it the possibility to annihilate and threaten humanity. The structural integrity would remain the same as nuclear bombs, however manufactured with nano-materials to allow production to a smaller scale.

Engineers and scientists alike, realise some of these proposed developments may not be feasible within the next two decades as more research needs to be undertaken, improving models to be quicker and more efficient. Particularly molecular nanotechnology, requires further understanding of manipulation and reaction, in order to adapt it to a military arena.

== Implications ==
Nanotechnology and its use in warfare promises economic growth however comes with the increased threat to international security and peacekeeping. The rapid emergence of new nanotechnologies have sparked discussion surrounding the impacts such developments will have on geo-politics, ethics, and the environment.

=== Geo-political ===
Difficulty in categorisation of nano-weapons, and their intended purposes (defensive or offensive) compromises the balance of stability and trust in the global environment. "A lack of transparency about an emerging technology not only negatively effects public perception but also negatively impacts the perceived balance of powers in the existing security environment." The peace and cohesion of the international structure may possibly be negatively affected with a continuing military-focused development of nanotechnology in warfare. Ambiguity and a lack of transparency in research increases difficulty of regulation in this area. Similarly, arguments put forward from a scientific standpoint, highlight the limited information known, concerning the implications of creating such powerful technology, in regards to reaction of the nano-particles themselves. "Although great scientific and technological progress has been made, many questions about the behaviour of matter at the nanoscale level remain, and considerable scientific knowledge has yet to be learned."

=== Environmental ===
The introduction of nanotechnology into everyday life enables potential benefits of use, yet carries the possibility of unknown consequences for the environment and safety. Possible positive developments include creation of nano-devices to decrease remaining radio-activity in areas, as well as sensors to detect pollutants and adjust fuel-air mixtures. Associated risks may involve; military personnel inhaling nanoparticles added to fuel, possible absorption of nanoparticles from sensors into the skin, water, air or soil, dispersion of particles from blasts through the environment (via wind), alongside disposal of nano-tech batteries potentially affecting ecosystems. Applications for materials or explosive devices, allow a greater volume of nano-powders to be packed into a smaller weapon, resulting in a stronger and possibly lethal toxic effect.

=== Social and ethical ===
It is unknown the full extent of consequences that may arise in social and ethical areas. Estimates can be made on the associated impacts as they may mirror similar progression of technological developments and affect all areas. The main ethical uncertainties entail the degree to which modern nanotechnology will threaten privacy, global equity and fairness, while giving rise to patent and property right disputes. An overarching social and humanitarian issue, branches from the creative intention of these developments. 'The power to kill or capture debate', highlights the unethical purpose and function of destruction these nanotechnological weapons supply to the user.

Controversy surrounding the innovation and application of nanotechnology in warfare highlights dangers of not pre-determining risks, or accounting for possible impacts of such technology. "The threat of nuclear weapons led to the cold war. The same trend is foreseen with nanotechnology, which may lead to the so-called nanowars, a new age of destruction", stated by the U.S. Department of Defense. Similarly a report released by Oxford University, warns of the pre-eminent extinction of the human race with a 5% risk of this occurring due to development of 'molecular nanotech weapons'.

== Regulation ==
International regulation for such concerns surrounding issues of nanotechnology and its military application, are non existent. There is currently no framework to enforce or support international cooperation to limit production or monitor research and development of nanotechnology for defensive use. "Even if a transnational regulatory framework is established, it is impossible to determine if a nation is non-compliant if one is unable to determine the entire scope of research, development, or manufacturing."

Producing legislation to keep-up with the rapid development of products and new materials in the scientific spheres, would pose as a hindrance to constructing working and relevant regulation. Productive regulation should assure public health and safety, account for environmental and international concerns, yet not restrict innovation of emerging ideas and applications for nanotechnology.

=== Proposed regulation ===
Approaches to development of legislation, possibly include progression towards classified non-disclosive information pertaining to military use of nanotechnology. A paper written by Harvard Journal of Law and Technology, discusses laws that would revolve around specific export controls and discourage civilian or private research into nano-materials. This proposal suggests mimicking the U.S. Atomic Energy Act of 1954, restricting any distribution of information regarding the properties and features of the nanotechnology at creation.

=== The Nanomaterial Registry ===
A United States National Registry for Nanotechnology has enabled a public sphere where reports are available for curated data on physico-chemical characteristics and interactions of nanomaterials. Requiring further development and more frequent voluntary additions, the register could initiate global regulation and cooperation regarding nanotechnology in warfare.

The registry was developed to assist in the standardisation, formatting, and sharing of data. With more compliance and cooperation this data sharing model may "simplify the community level of effort in assessing nanomaterial data from environmental and biological interaction studies." Analysis of such a registry would be carried out with expertise by professional nano-scientists, creating a filtering mechanism for any potentially newly developed or dangerous materials.

However, this idea of a specific nonmaterial registry is not original, as several databases have been developed previously including the caNanoLab and InterNano which are both engaging and accessible to the public, informatively curated by experts, and detail tools of nano manufacturing . The National Nanomaterial Registry, is a more updated version in which information is collated from a range of these sources and multiple additional data resources. It translates a greater range of content regarding; comparison tools with other materials, encouraging standard methods, alongside compliance rating features.
