= Porton Man =

Animatronic robot for military testing

Porton Man is an animatronic, humanoid robot, commissioned by the Defence Science and Technology Laboratory (DSTL) and designed and built by i-bodi Technology, primarily to test the capability of protective clothing used by the UK armed forces.

The animatronic contains over 100 sensors throughout the ‘body’, enabling scientists to conduct research on the effectiveness of chemical, biological and radiological protective suits used by the UK armed forces in real time. Such real-time test have varying benefits and limitations. It has the capability to walk, march, run, sit, kneel and lift its arms, therefore being able to more accurately represent an infantry soldier than a stationary mannequin.

The animatronic cost about £1.1 million and was developed using lightweight Formula 1 technology. Porton Man stands at 5 feet 10 inches (1.78 m) and weighs only 14 kilograms (31 lb), compared to previous models which weighed 80 kilograms (180 lb).

The robot was named after the home of the DSTL, Porton Down in Wiltshire.

As of 2017, Porton Man had 'run' the equivalent of 200 miles over various chemical, biological and radiological tests. The US Department of Defense has also used Porton Man since at least 2016, and it was officially endorsed by the US Army in 2018.
