= Gerald Bernbaum =

Gerald Bernbaum FRSA (born 25 March 1936, died 16 September 2017) was an educationist and university administrator. He was Vice-Chancellor and Chief Executive of South Bank University (now London South Bank University), London, England.

Bernbaum was Assistant Master at Mitcham County Grammar School for Boys (1958–62) and then Head of Department at Rutherford School (1962–64). He moved to the University of Leicester and was a lecturer in education (1964–70), senior lecturer (1970–74), Professor of Education (1974–93) and Director of the School of Education (1976–85). He moved into university administration at Leicester and became Pro-Vice-Chancellor (1985–87) followed by Executive Pro-Vice-Chancellor and Registrar (1987–93). He moved to South Bank University in London to become Vice-Chancellor and Chief Executive (1993–2001) before his retirement.

He was a consultant for the Organisation for Economic Co-operation and Development (OECD, 1970–75). He became a Fellow of the Royal Society of Arts in 1984. He was Chairman of the Governors of Morley College (2004–05).

Bernbaum was awarded an honorary degree (Doctor of Laws) by the University of Leicester in July 2000, where he formerly worked in the School of Education. Subsequently, he was also awarded an honorary degree by London South Bank University in November 2004.

Bernbaum died on 16 September 2017 after a battle against cancer.

== Books ==
Bernbaum wrote a number of books on educational matters, including:

- Bernbaum, Gerald, Social Change and the Schools: 1918–1944. Brill Academic Publishers, 1967. ISBN 0-7100-4220-5.
- Bernbaum, Gerald, Knowledge and Ideology in the Sociology of Education. London: Macmillan, 1977. ISBN 0-333-15762-1.
- Bernbaum, Gerald, editor, Schooling in Decline. London: Macmillan, 1979. ISBN 0-333-23293-3.

Academic offices
Preceded by Pauline Perry	Vice-Chancellor of South Bank University; 1993–2001	Succeeded by Deian Hopkin
