= Adam Werritty =

Scottish businessman (born 1978)

Adam Werritty (born 18 July 1978) is a Scottish businessman. Werritty is a friend of the former UK Secretary of State for Defence and ex-Secretary of State for International Trade Liam Fox. He lived for a period in 2002 and 2003 at Fox's London flat and was best man at his wedding in 2005. The two were also business associates who once held joint investments in the healthcare consultancy firm UK Health. Werritty was reportedly an adviser of Fox's and is known to have accompanied him on at least 18 foreign business trips between 2009 and 2011. In 2007, when Fox was shadow Defence Secretary, they both attended a meeting with the Gulf Research Centre. Werritty was also appointed by Fox as the chief executive of the now disbanded conservative Atlanticist think-tank "The Atlantic Bridge".

Werritty made visits to Fox at the Ministry of Defence (MoD) in Whitehall on 22 occasions in 16 months; Werrity was not security-cleared with the MoD. Additionally, over a 17-month period, ending October 2011, Werritty was present at 40 of Fox's 70 recorded engagements. The uncertain nature of Werritty's relationship with Fox led to an investigation by senior civil servants, initially the MoD's Permanent Secretary Ursula Brennan and latterly the Cabinet Secretary Sir Gus O'Donnell. Fox claimed that Werrity had never worked for him either in an official or unofficial capacity despite allegations that he was using a source of advice outside the Civil Service, paid for by private funds. Disclosure of increasing amounts of detail of their contact, funding and explanations of their relationship led to Fox's resignation on 14 October 2011 in advance of O'Donnell's report of his investigation.

== Personal life ==
Born in Kirkcaldy, Werrity was raised in St Andrews, Fife, and went to Madras College, where he played rugby in the 1st XV. He was also the 1st year boys school sports champion.

Werritty went to the University of Edinburgh to study public policy, becoming vice-president of the Scottish Conservative and Unionist Students branch. He graduated with a 2:2 in social policy.

He left Scotland to work for the healthcare company PPP and lived in several places in London and stayed rent-free between 2002 and 2003 in Fox's taxpayer-subsidised flat in Southwark, near Tower Bridge. Werritty was Fox's best man at his wedding in 2005.

Werritty lives in Pimlico near Vauxhall Bridge, close to Parliament. He is a member of the Carlton Club and the Conservative Party.

== Investigation ==
Werritty was investigated by senior civil servants led by Cabinet Secretary Sir Gus O'Donnell. The Prime Minister David Cameron first asked for an interim report of the MoD internal inquiry by 10 October 2011. The final report was initially due to be submitted on 21 October 2011 but O'Donnell's finding were released earlier than anticipated on 18 October. Amongst other findings, the report stated that the former defence secretary had blocked civil servants from attending key meetings where Adam Werritty was in attendance and had also failed to tell his permanent secretary that he had solicited funds to bankroll Werritty, he had also ignored private office requests to distance himself from the relationship.

The investigations into Werrity's close ties also revealed that he had visited Fox in the Ministry of Defence Main Building on 22 occasions during a period of 16 months. In addition, Werrity was present on 18 overseas trips undertaken by Fox in the course of his duties as Secretary of State. On 10 October 2011 the MoD published a full list of Fox's meetings, from the beginning of his term in office (20 May 2010) to 8 October 2011, and it revealed that Werrity was present at 40 of Fox's 70 engagements in that period.

== Ties to Liam Fox ==
His friendship with Liam Fox began in the late 1990s, when Fox was an Opposition Front Bench Spokesman on Scotland and Constitutional Affairs and when Werritty was studying public policy at Edinburgh University. They had a shared interest in politics and the United States.

On 10 October 2011 in a statement to the House of Commons, Liam Fox said that Werritty worked as a paid intern in Fox's parliamentary office when the Conservative Party was in opposition (1997-2010) and at this time had a Parliamentary pass. Fox said records showed Werritty received a total payment of £5,800 for research work undertaken during that time.

Werritty lived in Fox's apartment in Southwark, London, during 2002 and 2003. The property in which Werrity stayed rent free was mortgaged at £1,400 per month and covered by Fox's Additional Costs Allowance (ACA), part of his MP's expenses.

In 2011, Werritty stayed with Fox at a villa in Spain during an August holiday break at the climax of the 2011 Libyan civil war.

=== Foreign trips to Dubai, Israel, Washington, and Sri Lanka ===
Financial backers linked to Israel and a private intelligence firm helped fund Werritty's travels with Fox. In April 2007, Werritty and Fox attended an official meeting with the Gulf Research Centre, an independently run body that conducts research on issues concerning the Middle East. The two also attended an Israeli security conference centred on relations with Palestine, as well as Iranian sanctions, which took place in Herzliya in 2009. Fox is a strong supporter of Israel and is a member of Conservative Friends of Israel. Werritty is listed in conference proceedings as "Dr. Adam Werritty", an adviser to Fox in his role as Shadow Defence Secretary. In September 2010 the pair were in Washington and met at a defence industry dinner attended by some of the US's leading generals, including General James Mattis, commander of US Central Command.

In June 2011 Werritty organised a business meeting at the Shangri-La Hotel in Dubai. The meeting was attended by Werritty, Fox, the British private equity boss and CEO of the Porton Group Harvey Boulter, and two other Dubai-based businessmen. Werritty had earlier been contacted by a lobbying firm known as Tetra Strategy, whom Boulter had hired at a rate of £10,000 per month, in an attempt to have Fox intervene in a Porton Group legal dispute that indirectly involved the MoD. Tetra are believed to have begun working towards arranging a meeting with Werritty or Fox as early as 25 March 2011. In an email from Lee Petar, Tetra's boss, to Boulter, Werrity is described as the "special adviser to the secretary of state for defence Liam Fox."

Werritty's initial meeting with Boulter in April 2011 led to discussions with Fox regarding the sale of a product called Cellcrypt. The 45-minute Dubai meeting in June 2011 was primarily about the possible sale of the voice encryption software to the British MoD. Boulter has claimed that the matter of a legal battle between Porton Group and 3M concerning Acolyte, an EU regulatory approved rapid detection technology for MRSA, and a deal worth £41 million was allocated no more than 5–10 minutes at the end of the meeting. According to The Guardian, details relating to the nature of the visit and the business matters discussed suggest that it was "highly irregular". The MoD has stated that there were no officials present at the meeting but that one of those present claimed to have received the impression that all of those in attendance had been security cleared. Werritty did not have such clearance.

On 7 October 2011, The Guardian reported that Werritty met senior Sri Lankan ministers on an official visit with Fox in summer 2011. The Sri Lankan trip was originally scheduled for December 2010 but a disagreement with the foreign secretary, William Hague, saw the visit changed to July despite allegations that the Sri Lankan government supported paramilitary groups in defeating the Tamil Tigers. As a result of the trip questions were raised about the appropriateness of Werritty accompanying Fox on government trips abroad. Fox had previously claimed that Werritty had never joined him on such trips but details relating to how frequently Werritty was in his company while abroad later emerged.

==== Overview of all foreign trips with Fox ====
Between February 2009 and 2011 Werritty was in Fox's company on many trips abroad:

- Israel, February 2009.
- Singapore, 4–6 June 2010.
- Dubai, 7–8 June 2010.
- Florida, 2–3 July 2010.
- Dubai, 6–8 August 2010.
- Washington DC September 2010
- Bahrain, 2–6 December 2010.
- Dubai, 17–22 December 2010.
- Hong Kong, 16–23 January 2011.
- Israel, 6–7 February.
- Switzerland, 17–21 February.
- Dubai, April 2011.
- Abu Dhabi, 14–18 April 2011.
- Florida/Washington, 22–25 May 2011.
- Hong Kong, 31 May – 1 June 2011.
- Singapore, 2–6 June 2011.
- Sri Lanka, July 2011.
- Dubai, 17 June 2011.
- Washington DC, 30 June – 3 July 2011.
- Spain, 5–9 August 2011.

=== Reported advisory role ===
Wealthy Conservative donors including Michael Hintze indirectly provided financial support for Werrity's role as a political and strategic adviser to Fox by funding organisations such as Atlantic Bridge, a registered charity set up by Fox and run by Werrity that was used to bankroll the adviser's various international travels. Hintze, a major Tory party donor, donated £104,000 to Fox's charity. He also provided Werritty with free office space at the headquarters of his £5bn CQS hedge fund and allowed both Fox and Werritty to use his private jet. Days before the forced cessation of Atlantic Bridge's operations by the Charity Commission, Werrity founded a company called Pargav Ltd., which went on to receive a further £147,000 in donations from Tory party supporters and businessmen. Pargav's sole director was Oliver Hylton, a close senior aide of Hintze's and the manager of his charitable foundation that paid the donations to Atlantic Bridge. It emerged that Hylton, who was initially suspended by CQS following news of the Werrity affair, later ceased employment with the company.

Werritty was involved in a number of secret meetings (the first, on 8 September 2009) organised by Denis Macshane, involving himself and Matthew Gould, Britain's Ambassador to Israel, with the intention of enlisting British support for an Israeli attack on Iran.

Werritty's close ties to Conservative hardliners, it was argued, enabled him to bypass Whitehall officials and helped Fox promote strongly pro-American policies and Euroscepticism in the UK and abroad. In response to revelations about Werrity's activities becoming publicly known, Fox's political allies launched an effort to distance Werritty from the minister by describing him as an opportunist who had "taken advantage" of his personal relationship with Fox and as someone who was a fantasist "masquerading as someone he was not."

Werritty distributed business cards that declared he was an "advisor (sic) to the Rt Hon Dr Liam Fox MP" although Fox claims he requested him not to do so. Werritty also made visits to Fox at the MoD's HQ in Whitehall on 22 occasions in 16 months which led the Labour Party to request an inquiry into a possible national security breach. Werritty was able to arrange access to the minister for private sector companies on matters where they could both see commercial gains, despite denials of any role as an adviser.

Fox has claimed that Werritty was not connected with backers of companies who wanted defence contracts but was instead funded by ideological backers. According to the BBC this meant that Fox was using sources of advice outside the Civil Service and paid for by private funds. Fox has declared that: "I do accept that given Mr Werritty's defence-related business interests, my frequent contacts with him may have given an impression of wrongdoing, and may also have given third parties the misleading impression that Mr Werritty was an official adviser rather than simply a friend".

The former chairman of the Standards and Privileges Committee, Sir Alistair Graham, stated that Fox had shown serious misjudgement and the BBC's political editor Nick Robinson observed that whatever Fox claimed "many will judge that Adam Werritty acted as his adviser...his business cards stated he was an adviser, he booked hotels as an adviser, he fixed meetings with people who believed he was an adviser...he raised funds from people who thought that too...[and] the sole director of the not-for-profit company set up to fund Werritty regarded him as 'an adviser of some sort to Dr Fox'."

=== Role in the Atlantic Bridge ===
Werritty was also responsible for operating The Atlantic Bridge from Fox's office at taxpayers' expense. The conservative "charity" worked in conjunction with a US lobbying group, the American Legislative Exchange Council (ALEC), which allows cooperation between legislators and corporations such as Philip Morris, Texaco and McDonald's in addressing common interests. According to US charity records, Werritty was listed as the UK executive director with an address corresponding to Fox's former room at the House of Commons, No. 341 in the MPs' block at Portcullis House, which served as the charity's official headquarters. The Guardian reported that, between 2007 and 2010, Werritty's income as chief executive of The Atlantic Bridge was in excess of £90,000. The charity was established by Fox to help US/UK relations and serve as a reminder of the Reagan-Thatcher era and Werritty was given a lead role. The charity also functioned as a counterpart to the ALEC-founded Atlantic Bridge Group, a sister organisation in the United States. Following criticism by regulators that the charity was too politically oriented to be eligible for charitable status, the UK wing disbanded in September 2011.

=== Resignation of Liam Fox ===
On 14 October 2011, following the furore over Adam Werritty, Liam Fox resigned from his position of Defence Secretary.

== See also ==
- The Atlantic Bridge Research and Education Scheme
