= David Phoenix =

English biochemist

David Phoenix OBE DL FREng FAcSS
- Born: David Andrew Phoenix; 26 February 1966 (age 60); Davyhulme, Lancashire, England
- Education: University of Liverpool; Open University
- Known for: Peptide-lipid interaction; function of antibacterial peptides
- Awards: Order of the British Empire 2010; Deputy Lieutenant 2015; Friendship Award (China) 2016
- Scientific career
- Fields: Biochemistry/Biophysics/Molecular engineering
- Workplaces: University of Liverpool; University of Utrecht; University of Central Lancashire

David Andrew Phoenix OBE DL FREng FAcSS (born 1966) is an English biochemist and Vice-Chancellor of The Open University.

== Academic background ==
Phoenix read biochemistry at the University of Liverpool then studied part-time to obtain a degree in mathematics from the Open University before moving into the field of molecular engineering. His work remains multidisciplinary and he has published widely on the structure-function relationship of amphiphilic biomolecules, obtaining a chair in Biochemistry in 2000. He is especially known for his work on the design of antimicrobial peptides which led to the award of a Higher Doctorate by Liverpool University. He has held Visiting Chairs in Russia, China, Canada and the UK, including King's College London and Sichuan University.

In addition to research papers, edited collections and research monographs he has written widely on the development of technical education and skills. He was elected to the Academy of Social Sciences for this work.

He has been involved in STEM communication and outreach as Editor in Chief for journals such as The Biologist (Royal Society of Biology) that are aimed at a broader readership and as Vice Chair of the Science Museum Group and Chair of the Museum for Science and Industry.

== Significant awards ==
- 2009 Doctor of Science, Liverpool University.
- 2010 Officer of the Order of the British Empire (OBE).
- 2012 Academician of the Academy of Social Sciences.
- 2013 Honorary Doctorate of the University of Bolton (DUniv).
- 2013 Elected as a non-medic to Fellowship of the Royal College of Physicians of Edinburgh.
- 2015 Deputy Lieutenant, DL, Greater London.
- 2016 Appointed to Friendship Award (China)
- 2023 Fellow of the Royal Academy of Engineering

== Professional recognition ==
He was granted Chartered Chemist, Chartered Biologist and Chartered Mathematician status. Phoenix was given Fellowships by the Royal Society of Chemistry (FRSC), the Royal Society of Biology (FRSB), the Institute of Mathematics and its Applications. (FIMA), the Royal Society of Medicine (FRSM) and the Institution of Engineering and Technology (FIET). His work in support of teaching was recognised by the award of a Senior Fellowship by the Higher Education Academy and later advanced to Principal Fellow. Phoenix represented the UK on the European Committee of Biological Associations (ECBA) and was a Commissioner for Biotechnology.

== Career history ==
He was awarded a long-term fellowship by the European Molecular Biology Organisation which enabled him to investigate the importance of amphiphilicity in protein translocation at Utrecht University Centre for Biomembranes and Lipid Enzymology. He continued to work on amphiphilic helices, being one of the first to help characterise their role as membrane protein anchors and identifying key design features of bioactive peptides.

He was the Inaugural Head of Forensic and Investigative Science at the University of Central Lancashire and later as dean of science and Technology he launched new Schools of Pharmacy and of architecture. As Deputy Vice-Chancellor he setup UCLan Biomedical Technology Ltd, a research institute based in Shenzhen, China . and oversaw the development of research collaborations with key Chinese universities such as Fudan University and Sichuan University in areas of nanoscience and nanoengineering. In 2012 he became Chair of UCLan Cyprus Ltd and provided the academic lead on the de novo creation of a private university in Larnaca, obtaining a licence to operate from the Ministry of Education with approval to initially run courses in business, languages, law, computing and mathematics.

In 2013 he was selected to replace Martin Earwicker upon his retirement as Vice-Chancellor and Chief Executive of London South Bank University, later obtaining Ministerial approval to create the LSBU Group which includes London South Bank Technical College, the first comprehensive technical college for a generation and a new technical sixth form.

He served as Chair of MillionPlus, The Association for Modern Universities and has also been a Non-Executive Director on Universities UK, the National Center for Universities and Business and London Higher.

In July 2025, he was appointed as the Vice-Chancellor of The Open University.

Academic offices
Preceded by Martin Earwicker	Vice-Chancellor of London South Bank University; 2014–2025	Succeeded by Paul Kett
Preceded by Tim Blackman	Vice-Chancellor of The Open University; 2025-present	Incumbent
Professional and academic associations
Preceded by Michael Gunn	Chair of MillionPlus; 2015–2020	Succeeded by Bill Rammell
