= Michael Hintze, Baron Hintze =

British-Australian businessman, philanthropist and Conservative Party patron (born 1953)

The Right Honourable The Lord Hintze AM
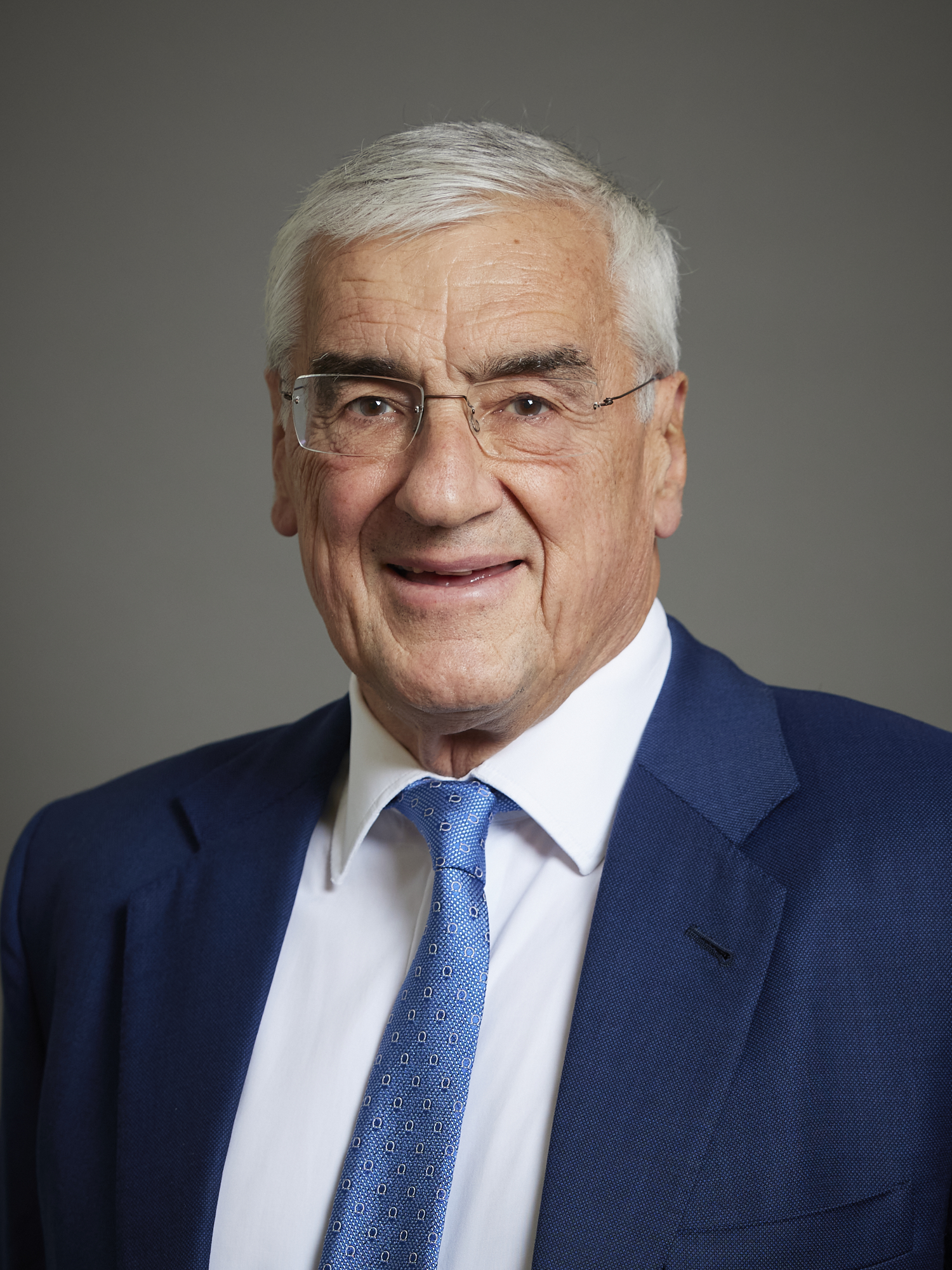
- Born: 27 July 1953 (age 73); Harbin, China
- Education: St Leo's College, Wahroonga
- Alma mater: University of Sydney; University of New South Wales; Harvard Business School
- Occupation: Asset manager
- Organization: CQS
- Spouse: Dorothy Krauklis (m. 1984)
- Children: 4
- Military career
- Allegiance: Australia
- Branch: Australian Army
- Service years: 3 years
- Rank: Captain

Member of the House of Lords
- Lord Temporal
- Life peerage 3 November 2022

Michael Hintze, Baron Hintze, AM (born 27 July 1953) is an Australian-British businessman and philanthropist, based in the United Kingdom.

== Early life ==
After his grandparents fled from Russia following the 1917 Bolshevik revolution, he was born in the Chinese city of Harbin. Then, after Mao Zedong and the Chinese Communist Party took over power of China, his refugee parents left for Australia.

Raised by his mother in Sydney, he was educated at St Leo's College, Wahroonga. He then studied at the University of Sydney where he obtained a BSc degree in physics in 1975 and a BE degree in engineering in 1977, residing at St John's College and working as a tutor at Sancta Sophia College. He also holds an MSc degree in acoustics from the University of New South Wales, an MBA degree from Harvard Business School, an Honorary Doctorate of Business from the University of New South Wales, and a DEng (honoris causa) from the University of Sydney.

On graduation, he joined the Australian Army for three years, rising to the rank of captain. Following that, he worked as an electrical design engineer for Civil and Civic Pty Ltd. in Australia.

== Career ==
Moving to New York to train in financial services, he worked for Salomon Brothers as a fixed income trader and at Credit Suisse First Boston. Relocating to London with them, he then joined Goldman Sachs, where his ultimate position was as co-head of the UK Shares Product. He left the firm in 1995.

=== CQS ===
In 1999, he launched his own asset management firm CQS. Hintze was ranked No. 5 on Financial News' FN100 Most Influential list in the hedge fund category. CQS Asset Management, which has been described as "one of the world's leading credit market players", has assets under management reported at $11 billion.

CQS Directional Opportunities Fund, which is managed by Hintze, was ranked #3 on Bloomberg's list of the 100 top-performing large hedge funds for 2012. In 2013, Hintze's CQS received awards for the "Best Hedge Fund Manager Overall," "Best Hedge Fund Manager in Credit," and "Best Multi-Hedge Fund Manager" at the Financial News Awards for Excellence in Institutional Hedge Fund Management. CQS was reported to be on the opposite side of the infamous JPMorgan trade by Bruno Iksil, nicknamed "the London Whale", in which JPMorgan lost an estimated $2 billion. The total gains by CQS are unknown. In 2018, it was reported that CQS's main fund increased by 30%. In a March 2018 article published in Barron's, Hintze stated that "every crisis is a trading opportunity".

In December 2019, Barrons reported that "the roughly $19 billion fund is taking the view that next year will bring more investment opportunities among distressed companies, meaning those that are in default, restructuring, or at risk of either event. Their calls on two specific sectors—malls and the energy sector—are especially notable because they are contrarian."

In April 2020, Bloomberg reported that "Michael Hintze's main fund was said to face at least 30% drop in quarter".

=== Professional appointments ===
Hintze has been tapped to sit on a number of boards and government panels. He was appointed by the Australian Treasury to sit on a four-person International Advisory Panel to support the Financial Systems Inquiry (FSI), which is focused on issues impacting Australia's economy such as technological change, Australia's global competitiveness and offshore regulatory frameworks.

Hintze was appointed by Pope Francis to the board of the Vatican Bank (officially known as the Institute for the Works of Religion). According to ValueWalk, "The addition of Hintze is viewed as a significant positive for the Vatican" due to the fact that he is a "no nonsense manager with deep insight into a broad range of international finance matters."

In the UK, Hintze was also appointed to serve on the Fair and Effective Markets Review, a joint review by the Treasury, the Bank of England and the Financial Conduct Authority (FCA) focused on raising standards of conduct in the financial system. He also sits on the Finance & Audit Committee of the Duchy of Cornwall.

== Farming ==
In 2007, Hintze established MH Premium Farms (MHPF), a group of agriculture companies based mainly in Australia. As of 2017, MHPF owned more than twenty properties in eastern Australia, covering a total area of more than 70,000 hectares (170,000 acres). The properties offer a broad portfolio including: fat lambs, wool and cattle; broadacre cropping of cereals and oilseeds; irrigated cotton and sugar.

Sustainable agricultural processes and environmental responsibility are core facets of MHPF's approach.

== Philanthropy ==
With his wife Dorothy, Hintze set up the Hintze Family Charitable Foundation. In the area of culture and the arts, notable donations include enabling the restoration of Michelangelo's frescoes in the Pauline Chapel at the Vatican and in 2014 donating £5 million to the Natural History Museum, London. The donation to the Natural History Museum is the biggest single donation received by the museum in 133 years (in other words, since 1881 when the Museum opened to the public for the first time). The gift will be used in part to fund programmes to study problems that threaten Earth's biodiversity such as the maintenance of delicate ecosystems and the impacts of environmental pollution, as well as the battle against diseases such as malaria. The museum's Central Hall has since been renamed Hintze Hall.

Projects in culture and the arts have also enabled the refurbishment of the V&A's Sculpture Galleries, named the Dorothy and Michael Hintze Galleries, and have included sponsorship of an iconic exhibition of Raphael's Tapestries from the Sistine Chapel at the V&A, and a £2 million donation to the National Gallery.

The donation to the National Gallery has been used in part to fund refurbishment, including the installation of new technology to reduce the gallery's running costs and carbon footprint. Support has also been provided to the British Museum and the National Portrait Gallery. The Hintze Family Charitable Foundation is also listed as a Life Benefactor Donor to the National Theatre. Through CQS and the Hintze Family Charitable Foundation he provided funding to create a 'theatre in the round' at the Old Vic in London, amongst other significant support. He also came to the aid of Wandsworth Museum, which was facing imminent closure by offering a £2 million rescue package.

Hintze has also supported a major renovation of the Australian Museum. Known as Project Discover, the redevelopment effort has created new, expanded exhibition areas and education spaces. Michael has reportedly had a strong connection to the institution since he was a child growing up in Sydney, saying that it "instilled in me an intellectual curiosity" and that it was a "vital institution, deepening everyone's understanding of the nation's history through the lens of culture and science."

In the area of health, he co-chaired Clapham's Trinity Hospice campaign for a new in-patient centre which has now been completed. Hintze gave a $1 million gift to the University of Sydney's Charles Perkins Centre, which focuses on turning medical research into viable treatments. He has also provided support to the Evelina Children's Hospital.

His support for the armed services has included donations to The Royal Navy & Royal Marines Charity. Among other initiatives, this has included providing funding to support serving personnel and their families. He has also provided support to the Black Stork Charity to help construct one of the most advanced centres for rehabilitation of injured military personnel in the world.

In education, among major donations, he has established the chair of International Security at the University of Sydney and supported the University of Oxford Centre for Astrophysical Surveys, where the Annual Hintze Lecture has been established.

Funding was provided for the construction of a residential wing at St. John's College at the University of Sydney, which was named the Hintze Building. Hintze has also donated $1 million to the University of New South Wales (UNSW) for a new lecture theatre. The donation was made in honour of his father, Michael Hintze senior, who is also a UNSW alumnus. Gifts have also been made to Harvard University ($10m) and Princeton University, where a Professorship for the Arts has been established in his wife's maiden name (Dorothy Krauklis).

The Guardian reported that Hintze is a donor to the Global Warming Policy Foundation, which casts doubt on the science and cost of tackling climate change.

=== Philanthropic positions and recognition ===
Hintze currently serves as a trustee of the Institute of Economic Affairs, the University of Sydney Trust, as a Member of the Harvard Business School Board of Dean's Advisors', and as Senior Vice Patron of the Royal Navy & Royal Marines Charity. He was formerly chairman of the Prince's Foundation for Building Community.

Hintze was a trustee of the National Portrait Gallery from 2017 to 2021, and was formerly a trustee of the National Gallery, where he assisted in securing Titian's Diana and Actaeon. He was initially appointed to the National Gallery's Board of Trustees by then Labour Party Prime Minister Gordon Brown in 2008. He was later reappointed by Conservative Party Prime Minister David Cameron.

In recognition of their charitable contributions in support of the arts, Hintze and his wife Dorothy received the Prince of Wales Medal for Arts Philanthropy in 2009.

Hintze was invited to the Chancellor's Court of Benefactors for his support of the University of Oxford.

He was named to the 2017 Debrett's 500 List, in recognition of his considerable philanthropic contributions in the UK. He was also named on the Evening Standard's "Progress 1000" list of "London's most influential people," citing his philanthropic contributions and business success.

=== Conservative Party donations ===
In 2006, at the time of the Cash for Peerages allegations concerning the Labour Party, Hintze voluntarily revealed he was one of the previously anonymous patrons who had made loans to the Conservative Party. In 2011 his known loans and donations to the party totalled around £4 million. In the five months to September 2011 he donated £31,000, enough to grant him membership of the Conservative Treasurers' Group, the second highest rung on the party's donor's ladder, which allows its members access to senior Conservative figures through a series of lunches, receptions and campaign launches.

In May 2008, David Cameron declared a donation from Hintze to the Conservative Party that was used to pay for drinks receptions for Tory MPs and their partners.

In October 2011, it was revealed that Adam Werritty, a close friend and business associate of then Secretary of State for Defence Liam Fox, was provided with a free desk by Hintze at CQS's London base as part of his £29,000 donation to Fox's charity The Atlantic Bridge. Hintze also supplied a private jet for Fox and Werritty to fly from the United States to London in May 2011. These disclosures led to the resignation of Liam Fox (who was then Secretary of State for Defence) and the dismissal of Hintze's then-charity adviser, Oliver Hylton.

During the 2019 United Kingdom general election campaign Hintze donated £341,225 to the Conservative Party.

== Honours ==
In 2005 Hintze was appointed a Knight Commander of the Papal Order of St. Gregory (KCSG) by Pope Benedict XVI and was later elevated as a Knight Grand Cross of the same Order (GCSG).

In January 2013, Hintze was appointed Member of the Order of Australia (AM) for his "significant service to the community through philanthropic contributions to organisations supporting the arts, health and education."

He was knighted in the United Kingdom's 2013 Birthday Honours for services to the arts. He received his accolade on 23 October 2013 by The Prince of Wales at Buckingham Palace.

It was announced on 14 October 2022, that as part of the 2022 Special Honours, Hintze would be appointed a life peer. On 3 November 2022, he was created Baron Hintze, of Dunster in the County of Somerset.

== Personal life ==
In July 1984, Hintze married Dorothy Krauklis, a United States citizen whom he met at Harvard; they have four children. Hintze is a Roman Catholic.

=== Net worth ===
According to the Sunday Times 2019 Rich List, Hintze's net worth was £1.5 billion, an increase of £120 million from 2018. In the 2016 Forbes magazine list of the world's billionaires, he was the world's 1,011th richest person, with a net worth of approximately US$1.8 billion. As of May 2025, Hintze's net worth, according to the Australian Financial Review 2025 Rich List was A$2.12 billion.

Year	Financial Review Rich List		Forbes Australia's 50 Richest		Sunday Times Rich List	
Year	Rank	Net worth (A$)	Rank	Net worth (US$)	Rank	Net worth (£)
2011		$0.614 billion ▲	15 ▼	$1.40 billion ▲		
2012	40	$0.81 billion ▲	16 ▼	$1.40 billion		
2013	43 ▼	$0.86 billion ▲	16	$1.55 billion ▲		
2014	23 ▲	$1.37 billion ▲	15 ▲	$1.70 billion ▲		
2015	21 ▲	$1.75 billion ▲	15	$1.90 billion ▲		
2016	37 ▼	$1.32 billion ▼	13 ▲	$1.80 billion ▼		
2017	24 ▲	$1.98 billion ▲	17 ▼	$2.30 billion ▲		
2018	22 ▲	$2.56 billion ▲				£1.38 billion
2019	26 ▼	$2.72 billion ▲	13 ▲	$2.55 billion ▲		£1.50 billion ▲
2020	30 ▼	$2.60 billion ▼				
2021	52 ▼	$2.21 billion ▼				
2022	53 ▼	$2.20 billion ▼				
2023	60 ▼	$2.10 billion ▼				
2024		$2.20 billion ▲				
2025	78 ▼	$2.12 billion ▼				

Legend
Icon	Description
Steady	Has not changed from the previous year
▲	Has increased from the previous year
▼	Has decreased from the previous year

Orders of precedence in the United Kingdom
Preceded by The Lord Sahota	Gentlemen; Baron Hintze	Followed by The Lord Evans of Rainow
