= Martin Earwicker =

Martin John Earwicker FREng CCMI (born 11 May 1948) was Director of the National Museum of Science and Industry group of British museums (including the Science Museum, the National Railway Museum, and the National Media Museum) from 2006 until 2009. Prior to taking on this role, he was Chief Executive of the Defence Science and Technology Laboratory (Dstl).

Earwicker graduated with a degree in physics from the University of Surrey. He previously worked as Managing Director of the Defence Evaluation and Research Agency and head of Science and Engineering at the Office of Science and Technology‚ part of the Department of Trade and Industry. He was elected a Fellow of the Royal Academy of Engineering in 2000.

From April 2009 until 2013, Earwicker was Vice-Chancellor of London South Bank University, replacing Deian Hopkin on his retirement.

Academic offices
Preceded by Deian Hopkin	Vice-Chancellor of London South Bank University; 2009–2014	Succeeded by David Phoenix
Cultural offices
Preceded by Lindsay Sharp	Director of the National Museum of Science and Industry; 2006–2009	Succeeded by Molly Jackson
Business positions
New office	Chief Executive of Dstl; 2001–2006	Succeeded by Frances Saunders
