= G3 (company) =

Consulting organization

- Industry: Corporate Investigation; Risk Consulting; Cyber Security
- Founded: 2004
- Headquarters: London, United Kingdom
- Website: www.g3.co

G3, or the Good Governance Group, is a strategic advisory consultancy which specialises in Strategic Intelligence, Investigations and Cyber Security Advice. Its clients are private markets investors and multinational corporations.

== History ==
The company was set up in 2004 by two former senior executives from Kroll Inc. For a period of time it was owned by Kinnevik and it was then subject to a management buyout.

In 2022, G3 received investment from All Seas Capital and in 2025 Oakley Capital acquired a majority stake in the company. At this time, the company was reported to be valued at £250 million.

In 2023, Sir John Sawers, former Chief of Mi6, was appointed Chair of G3’s Senior Advisory Board.

In 2012, it was reported that the Group had received £1.5 million from the government of Bahrain for "a media campaign to support the Kingdom of Bahrain's stance before the international community", during the Bahraini uprising.

In June 2012, Proven acquired Palmer Legal Technologies, a provider of e-discovery and digital forensics services to litigation and dispute resolution teams involved in commercial litigation, internal compliance reviews and regulatory investigations.

In 2011, it was reported that the company was linked to an incident involving Adam Werritty, that led to the resignation of former UK Secretary of State for Defence Liam Fox.

== Background ==
The firm has offices in London and New York City, San Francisco, Tokyo, Singapore and Sydney. G3 works with multinational corporations and financial investors on strategic intelligence, commercial diligence, dispute resolution, regulation and compliance, cyber security, reputation management, and integrity due diligence.

The company also provides intelligence for businesses, such as competitor analysis and cyber security, including for the defence contractor BAE Systems.

== Services ==
- Strategic advice - Advice on commercial, geographic or political considerations in M&A transactions or expansion into new business sectors or territories
- Integrity due diligence – Pre-transactional due diligence on public or private entities or individuals to assess suitability of potential business partners
- Political and business risk management – Advice on challenging emerging or developed markets focused on anticipating and interpreting political, legal or regulatory events, trends or decisions that could affect business interests
- Dispute resolution – support to businesses engaged in complex, high value cases in multiple global jurisdictions, involving fraud, corruption, internal and regulatory investigations, asset profiling, and anti-bribery/corruption compliance
- E-disclosure and digital forensics – specialist e-disclosure, regulatory investigation and digital forensic services that include data mapping and collection
- Information and cyber security – advice on the optimisation of information security strategies and systems to enhance business opportunities and protect critical information infrastructure, including cyber security, digital investigations and online reputation
- Reputational intelligence – advice on the management and safeguarding of reputations
