= The Atlantic Bridge =

British educational charity (1997–2011)

The Atlantic Bridge Research and Education Scheme was an educational charity founded in 1997 with Margaret Thatcher as its president to promote Atlanticism, an ideology of cooperation between the United Kingdom and the United States regarding political, economic, and defence issues. It was set up by Liam Fox, former Secretary of State for Defence of the United Kingdom. Cabinet ministers Michael Gove, George Osborne and William Hague, and Chris Grayling have previously sat on its advisory panel, as have American senators Jon Kyl, Lindsey Graham and Joe Lieberman. The organisation's principal staff included Catherine Bray (US Executive Director), Adam Werritty (UK Executive Director) and Kara Watt (Operations Director).

It was dissolved in September 2011, following a critical report from the Charity Commission the previous year.

== Activities ==
In discussion with the Pittsburgh Tribune-Review, Fox claimed that the think tank was intended to "bring people together who have common interests and recognise that...[they] will all be called upon to defend those... interests". Its work largely consisted of uniting British and American Conservatives and foreign policy hawks. This included meetings with John Ashcroft and Karl Rove and the presentation of awards to Rudy Giuliani and Henry Kissinger.

In 2003, when Fox was Shadow Secretary for Health, he also chaired a conference on "scientific research and medical provision". Speakers included Grace-Marie Turner of the Galen Institute, Timothy Morris of GlaxoSmithKline and Peter Farrow of Pfizer.

== Funding and partnerships ==
The Atlantic Bridge was briefly a partnership program of the American Legislative Exchange Council (ALEC), a free-market organisation with extensive links to American State Legislators and corporate and industrial groups. It has hosted events with the Center for Security Policy, the Heritage Foundation and representatives from Lehman Brothers.

Patrons of the Atlantic Bridge have included UK Conservative Party donor Michael Hintze, a key funder of Atlantic Bridge who provided 58% of the charity's voluntary income, Pfizer, and Michael Lewis of the Britain Israel Communications and Research Centre.

== Charity Commission report ==
The Atlantic Bridge gained charitable status in 2003 as an "education and research scheme". In September 2009, the Charity Commission started a regulatory compliance case after receiving a complaint about the charity. A 2010 report by the Charity Commission ruled that it was "not evident that [it] had advanced education" and "may lead members of the public to call into question its independence from party politics". It was ordered to enact a 12-month review to bring it into line with its charitable objectives.

On 30 September 2011, The Atlantic Bridge was dissolved by its trustees.

== Controversy ==
In October 2011, The Guardian newspaper published details of an alleged improper relationship and interactions between Adam Werritty and Secretary of State for Defence Liam Fox, culminating in Fox's resignation on 14 October and a continuing official investigation. The controversy surrounded Werritty attending official defence meetings with Fox (notably in Pakistan) despite not being employed in any official capacity by the British government, Werritty's running of Pargav Ltd, and his ties with powerful Tory figures, supporters, and lobbyists through The Atlantic Bridge. Considering the rejected charitable status of The Atlantic Bridge, the question of Fox's independence and the distinction between the government, think-tanks, charities, and private business and corporate interests has been raised.

Werritty was investigated by senior civil servants led by Cabinet Secretary Sir Gus O'Donnell. The published report implicated a company named IRG Ltd, "But the report, which named the six companies and individuals that funded Werritty's Pargav "slush fund", has raised more unanswered questions. Among the Pargav donors, including the mining tycoon Mick Davis, private investigations firm G3 and billionaire property mogul Poju Zabludowicz, is a company referred to as simply "IRG Ltd". More than 30 companies and organisations use the same initials, including an Iraq-focused charity, an executive recruitment agency linked to the former Tory minister Virginia Bottomley and a pizza restaurant in Basildon."

== See also ==
- Anglosphere
