= Frances Saunders (scientist) =

British scientist

Dame Frances Saunders DBE CB FREng HonFInstP
- Born: 28 June 1954 (age 72)
- Other name: Frances Carolyn Saunders
- Education: University of Nottingham
- Known for: Chief Executive of Dstl; President of Institute of Physics
- Board member of: Engineering Development Trust - Trustee; Cranfield University - Council Member

Dame Frances Carolyn Saunders (born 28 June 1954) is a British scientist and former civil servant. She was the chief executive of Dstl between August 2007 and March 2012. Prior to this Saunders was a policy officer at the Office of Science and Technology and research scientist into liquid crystal devices at the Royal Signals and Radar Establishment. Saunders was the president of the Institute of Physics from 2013 to 2015.

Saunders attended the girls-only Portsmouth High School, before attending the University of Nottingham to study physics. She became Leyland's first female graduate engineer, on an electronic engineering apprenticeship, eventually leaving due to frustration that the electronic systems she worked on were not used on mass-production scales. This was when she joined the RSRE and started a part-time PhD in liquid crystal devices.

After retiring from Dstl in 2012, Saunders took on a number of activities promoting science, engineering and leadership, especially for young people. She was appointed as a member of the UK Space Agency Steering Board in 2015, was president of the IOP from 2013 to 2015, and is a trustee of the Engineering Development Trust. She was elected a fellow of the Royal Academy of Engineering in 2011, and was made a Companion of the Order of the Bath the same year.

In 2018, Saunders was named a Dame Commander of the Order of the British Empire (DBE) for "services to Science and Engineering", announced as part of the 2018 Queen's Birthday Honours List.

In December 2024, Saunders was awarded an Honorary Doctorate by Lancaster University.

Business positions
Preceded by Martin Earwicker	Chief Executive of Dstl; 2007–2012	Succeeded by Jonathan Lyle
