= International Journal of Humanities and Arts Computing =

- Discipline: History
- Language: English

Publication details
- Former names: History and Computing
- History: 1989–present
- Publisher: Edinburgh University Press (United Kingdom)
- Frequency: Biannual

Standard abbreviations
- ISO 4: Int. J. Humanit. Arts Comput.

Indexing
- International Journal of Humanities and Arts Computing
- ISSN: 1753-8548 (print); 1755-1706 (web)
- History & Computing
- ISSN: 0957-0144
- OCLC no.: 22659624

Links
- Journal homepage

International Journal of Humanities and Arts Computing is a biannual academic journal published in April and October by Edinburgh University Press. It was created in 2007 from the journal History and Computing, which had ceased publication in 2002. It is supported by three institutions: the International Association for History and Computing, the Electronic Cultural Atlas Initiative, and Digital Resources in the Humanities and Arts. The journal explores conceptual and theoretical approaches, along with case studies and essays that illustrate how advanced information technologies enhance scholarly research in traditional arts and humanities disciplines.
