= Jonathan Lyle =

Jonathan Lyle CB CEng FIET
- Born: February 1959; Salisbury, Wiltshire
- Citizenship: United Kingdom
- Board member of: Head of the Royal Corps of Naval Constructors, 2007-2011

Jonathan Henry Lyle CB (born February 1959) is a British engineer and former senior civil servant. He was chief executive of the Defence Science and Technology Laboratory (Dstl) between March 2012 and September 2017.

== Biography ==
After an initial post with the Ministry of Defence in Portsdown he worked in the maritime sector in Bath. In 1989 Lyle moved to London and undertook a number of cost and investment studies for future aircraft systems. He moved to the Office of Science and Technology at the Cabinet Office in 1991 and returned to defence procurement in 1996.

Lyle was promoted to the senior civil service in 2000 and appointed leader of the Future Offensive Air System Integrated Project Team (IPT). He was then promoted in 2004 to lead the Defence Procurement Agency's aircraft, helicopter and weapons projects. When the DPA was merged into the Defence Equipment and Support agency in 2007 Lyle was appointed Director General - Helicopters.

Lyle was also Director of the College of Management and Technology at the Defence Academy, Shrivenham during 2008 and 2009 and Head of the Royal Corps of Naval Constructors between 2007 and 2011. His final post in Civil Service was as Chief Executive (DG), Dstl, between 2012-17.

Lyle was appointed Companion of the Order of the Bath (CB) in the 2017 Birthday Honours.

Business positions
Preceded by Frances Saunders	Chief Executive of Dstl; 2012–2017	Succeeded by Gary Aitkenhead
