= CQS (Asset Manager) =

London-based global multi-strategy credit-focused asset management firm

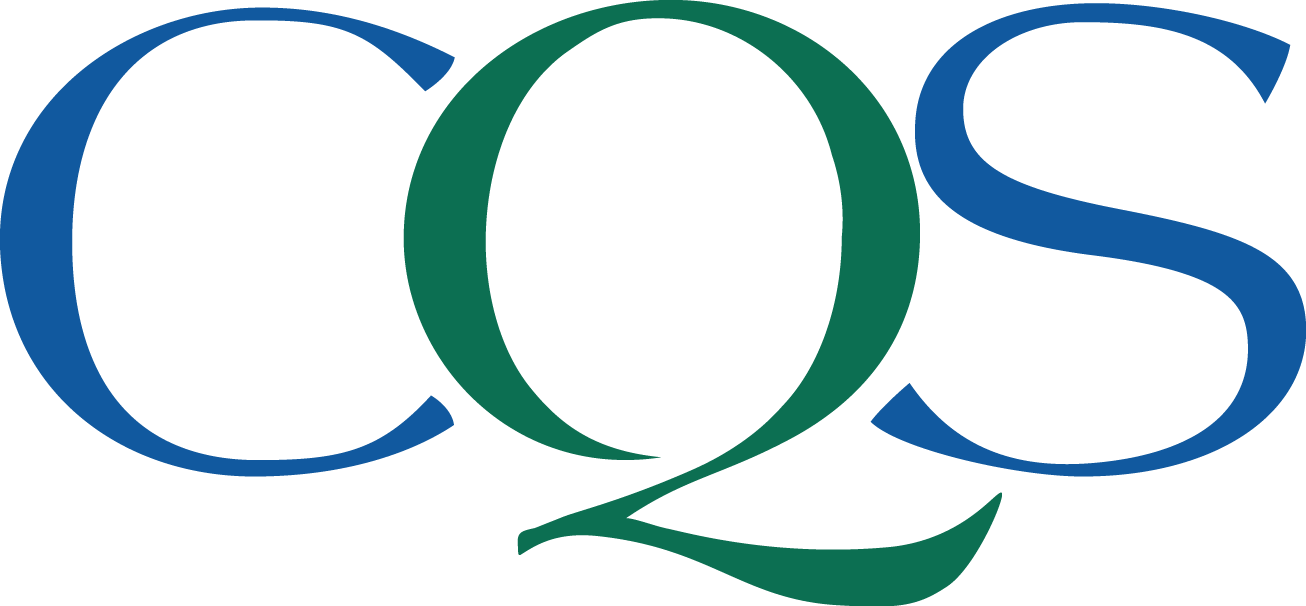
- Industry: Hedge fund
- Founded: 1999; 26 years ago
- Founder: Michael Hintze; Baron Hintze
- AUM: US$ 15.5 billion (as of Dec 15, 2023)
- Owner: Manulife (2024–present)
- Website: cqs.com

CQS is a London-based global multi-strategy credit-focused asset management firm. It launched its first credit strategy in 2000 and now manages a range of investment mandates. Specific investment capabilities include convertibles, asset backed securities, credit, loans, structured credit, and equities.

Their investors include pension funds, insurance companies, sovereign wealth funds, funds of funds, endowments and foundations, and private banks. CQS had successful bets on the US subprime mortgage market.

== History ==
CQS was founded in 1999 by Michael Hintze, who serves as the Group Executive Chairman and Senior Investment Officer. Prior to establishing CQS, Hintze was European Head of Convertible Bonds at Credit Suisse First Boston (CSFB) and Head of UK Equity Trading and European Convertible Bond Trading at Goldman Sachs.

In May 2012, it was reported to be on the opposite side of the infamous JPMorgan trade by Bruno Iskil, in which JPMorgan lost more than $2billion because of its massive position in U.S. credit derivatives.

As of December 2018, CQS had $18.1 billion in assets under management. According to Bloomberg, CQS's main fund gained 30.4% in 2016, posting its best annual returns since 2012.

In April 2020, it was reported CQS's Directional Opportunities Fund posted its biggest ever 30% decline in March.

In November 2023, it was announced that Manulife would acquire CQS. The transaction closed on April 3, 2024.

== Office locations ==
CQS has offices in London, Hong Kong, New York, and Sydney. Affiliates within the group are regulated by the Financial Conduct Authority (FCA) in London, the Securities and Futures Commission (SFC) in Hong Kong and the Australian Securities and Investments Commission (ASIC) in Sydney, and registered with the Securities and Exchange Commission (SEC) in New York.

CQS opened its Sydney, Australia office in 2010 and expanded its presence in the country in 2011.
