= Rutherford School =

Special needs school in Croydon, UK

Coordinates: 51.3600°N 0.0802°W

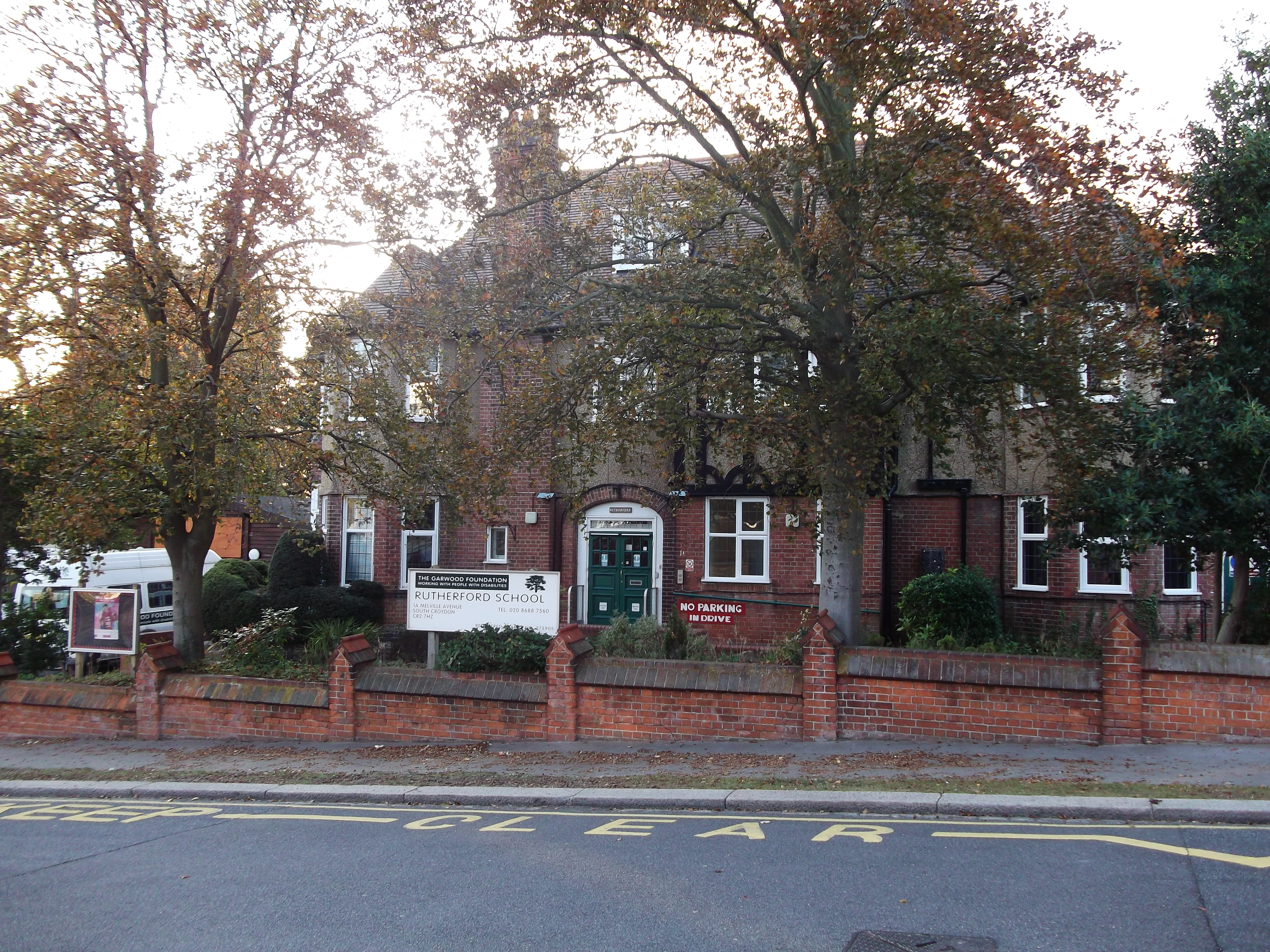
- Rutherford School
- London Borough of Croydon, United Kingdom

Information
- Type: Special school

Rutherford School is an independent special school for pupils with profound and multiple learning difficulties (PMLD) aged 3–19 that aims to provide inclusive education to learners whose very special needs are compounded by a high degree of dependency.

Rutherford School is part of The Garwood Foundation, a charity based in Croydon. The school is located on Melville Avenue, South Croydon, Greater London. The school facilitates learning that is supported and managed by a specialist range of therapies which address physical disabilities, sensory impairments and complex medical needs. The school has on-site medical and therapy provisions including nurses, physiotherapists and creative arts therapists.

== Sources ==
- Rutherford School official website
- The Garwood Foundation official website
