= Association for History and Computing =

Historical research organization

The Association for History and Computing (AHC) was an organization dedicated to the use of computers in historical research.

The AHC was an international organization with the aim of promoting the use of computers in all types of historical study, both for teaching and research. It was originally proposed at a conference at Westfield College, University of London, in March 1986. It was founded during a second conference at the same location a year later in March 1987.

The Association oversaw a journal, History and Computing (now International Journal of Humanities and Arts Computing, published by Edinburgh University Press.
