= Microvisk =

British medical device manufacturer

Microvisk Ltd
- Company type: Private company
- Industry: Point-of-care testing
- Founded: 2006; 20 years ago
- Founder: John Curtis
- Headquarters: Worminghall, United Kingdom
- Products: MEMS and coagulation devices
- Number of employees: 40 (2011)
- Website: www.microvisk.com

Microvisk is British a medical device company based in Oxfordshire that produces coagulant monitoring devices. Its main product is a microviscometer to perform the prothrombin time test, which measures how long it takes blood to clot.

It was a member of the Welsh Optoelectronics Forum – a group of companies specialising in optoelectronics which developed out of Pilkington’s glass manufacturing operations.

== History ==
The company was spun out of the UK’s Science and Technology Facilities Council in 2004, with initial backing from public Rainbow Seed Fund. It was funded through a mixture of private and venture capital investors, and established collaboration with the Royal Liverpool and Broadgreen University Hospitals NHS Trust. The UK clinical trials were facilitated by Trustech - part of the NHS Institute for Innovation and Improvement’s network of hubs across England.

Initially the site at St Asaph, North Wales handled sales and shipping, overall project management, clinical chemistry, data analysis, component production and administration. Research into sensors and micro-electromechanical technology was conducted at the site at Chipping Warden, Oxfordshire, along with sensor and electronics development. It developed a MEMs based microviscometer for the prothrombin time test.

In 2006 the company expanded its premises and undertook a clinical trial with the Royal London Hospital, which gave excellent results in comparison with a universally recognised laboratory-based industry standard. Initial research was carried out at the Rutherford Appleton Laboratory in Oxfordshire.

In 2008 the company increased staff levels and moved to a new facility with custom-built laboratories and additional office space, allowing future expansion. The company changed management in 2016 and moved to a new facility in Oxford in 2018 and moved its administration to Worminghall.

== Products ==
The company's main product is the CoagMax, a point of care INR monitor for home and professional use.
