= Lindsay Sharp =

Lindsay Gerard Sharp is a museologist who lives near Wollongong/Gerringong in the coastal hinterland of New South Wales in Australia. He works as a museum consultant and writer.

Born in Britain and raised in Australia, Sharp earned his doctorate in the history of ideas (science/natural philosophy) in 1976, receiving the Clifford Norton Research Fellowship in the History of Science from Queen's College, Oxford. He started his museological career at the Science Museum in London the same year he received his PhD, and for the next three decades worked all over the world.

In Australia, Sharp led the team responsible for creating Sydney's Powerhouse Museum and was its founding director Sharp also served as Director, Entertainment and Leisure, for Merlin International Properties in Australia and the UK. He was CEO/executive consultant to the Earth Exchange – a regenerated tourist, environmental and educational facility at the Rocks in Sydney, and deputy director/senior museum consultant to the Milken Family Foundation in Santa Monica, California. He was president and CEO of the Royal Ontario Museum in Toronto, Canada from 1997 to 2000 – Canada's equivalent of America's Smithsonian.

In 2000 Sharp was appointed as director of London's National Museum of Science and Industry – now known as the Science Museum Group – a family of museums that include the National Railway Museum, the Science Museum, and the National Museum of Photography, Film and Television (now National Science and Media Museum), the Dana Research Centre and Library, the National Railway Museum Shildon, and the National Collections Centre in Wiltshire, UK. He was founding director of the Dana Centre, and helped to re-plan the entire Science Museum Group, in all aspects, developing new strategic plans for the large and complex sites at each museum and enhancing the SMG's global electronic and educational engagement and reach. In June 2005 he was awarded the 2005 Public Promotion of Engineering Medal by the Royal Academy of Engineering.

Sharp's concern to draw more of the Science Museum's collection to the attention the public was sustained.

Since 2006 Sharp has consulted in Asia, Australasia, and the US, assisting cultural organisations in developing and engaging with broader audiences and becoming more sustainable.

Cultural offices
Preceded by Sir Neil Cossons	Director of the Science Museum; 2000–2005	Succeeded by Prof Martin Earwicker
