= P2i =

P2i Ltd
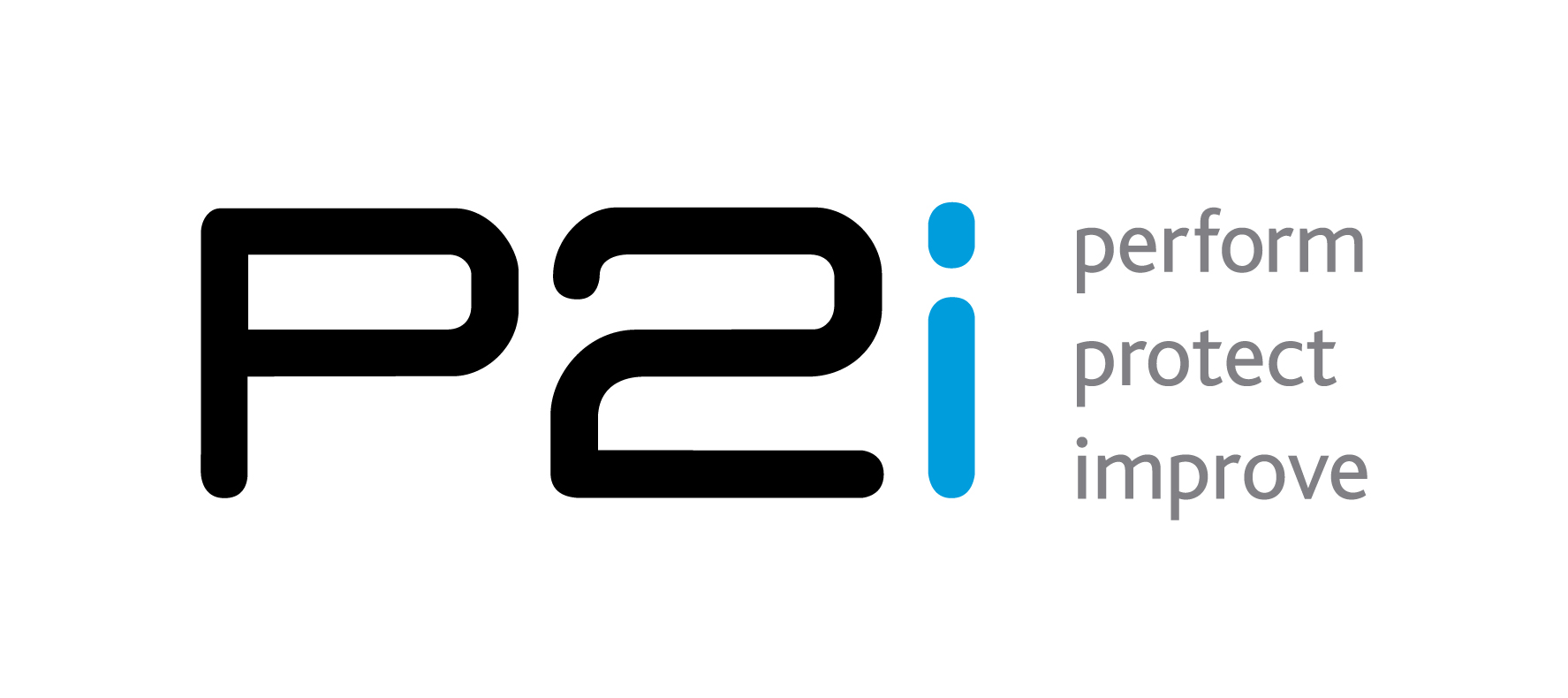
- Type: Private
- Genre: Nanotechnology
- Founded: 2004
- Headquarters: Abingdon, Oxfordshire, UK
- Area served: Global
- Key people: Ady Moores (Group Chief Executive); Stephen Coulson (Founder and President Information Security); Simon Vogt (Chief Commercial Officer); Martin Tolliday (Chief Product Officer); Ahilan Rabindran (Group Finance Director)

P2i is a nanotechnology development company that works with manufacturers to produce liquid repellent nano-coating protection to products for the electronics, lifestyle, life sciences, filtration and Energy, and military and institutional sectors.

The company was established in 2004 to commercialize technologies developed by the UK MoD's Defense Science and Technology Laboratory. In 2010 the company acquired Surface Innovations Limited, adding new technologies such as antimicrobial, super hydrophilic and protein resistance coatings.

In addition to headquarters in the United Kingdom, P2i has a processing facility in the United States, offices in Shenzhen, China and Taipei City, Taiwan, and representation in Korea. As of February 2016 P2i had deployed hundreds of its nano-coating systems globally, including factories in Brazil, Argentina, USA, China, India, Japan, Switzerland, Germany and the UK.

== Technology ==

The treatment decreases the surface energy of objects by adding a perfluorinated carbon polymer coating onto exposed surfaces. The coating reduces the disruption of intermolecular bonds within a liquid. Liquids thus tend to bead up instead of penetrating or absorbing into the object.

The treatment process coats objects using a pulsed plasma-enhanced chemical vapor deposition apparatus at room temperature. The coating is introduced as a vapor and ionized. This deposits a polymerized layer of the plasma monomers, which binds covalently and durably to the object's surface. The mild temperature and pressure conditions of this process permit a broad variety of items and materials to be treated. Occurring at low pressure, the coating penetrates complex three-dimensional objects, protecting it internally and externally in the same process. The coating, being very thin, does not alter the look or feel of solid objects or the vapor porosity of fabrics.

== History ==

P2i's process is based on the research and development work of Stephen Coulson and Jas Pal Badyal at Durham University. Coulson's work was funded by the United Kingdom's Defence Science and Technology Laboratory (DSTL) which aimed to protect clothing from water and other liquids while maximizing comfort. P2i Ltd was established as a stand-alone company in 2004, as the first DSTL technology spin-out managed by Ploughshare Innovations (the DSTL's technology transfer company).

On 13 July 2010, P2i announced the acquisition of Surface Innovations Ltd, a UK-based technology company with several functional nano-coating patent families in areas such as anti-bacterial resistance and liquid attracting (super wettable).

== Applications and brands ==
P2i's technology is currently applied in the fields of electronics, lifestyle, life sciences, filtration and energy, and military and institutional sectors. For consumer-facing products, the company has developed sector-specific trademarked brands. The ion-mask brand was used for lifestyle products such as footwear, outdoor clothing, and accessories like gloves and headwear. ion-mask products products were available from several international footwear companies, including Timberland, Nike, Adidas Golf, Hi-Tec, Magnum Boots, Van Dal, Teva, and K-Swiss.

P2i's nano-coating technology is utilized in the consumer electronics sector, with significant application in the hearing aid industry, where the company claims its coating is applied to 70% of the world's hearing devices. In 2013, P2i rebranded its traditional hydrophobic layer technology, previously known as Aridion, to "Splash-proof."

P2i has established partnerships with smartphone manufacturers such as Motorola and Huawei, as well as other top brands in the industry, including prominent Chinese manufacturers. In 2019, P2i had the capacity to treat over half a billion phones with its technology.
