= Defence Science and Technology Laboratory =

UK Government executive agency

Agency overview
- Formed: 2 July 2001
- Preceding agency: Defence Evaluation and Research Agency
- Jurisdiction: United Kingdom
- Headquarters: Porton Down, Wiltshire
- Employees: 5,063 (Note: As of 31 March 2025)
- Agency executive: Paul Hollinshead
- Parent agency: Ministry of Defence
- Website: www.gov.uk/government/organisations/defence-science-and-technology-laboratory

The Defence Science and Technology Laboratory (Dstl) is an executive agency of the Ministry of Defence of the United Kingdom. Its stated purpose is "to maximise the impact of science and technology for the defence and security of the UK". The agency is headed by Paul Hollinshead as its chief executive, with the board being chaired by Adrian Belton. Ministerial responsibility lies with the Minister of State for Defence Procurement and Industry.

== History ==
Dstl was formed from the July 2001 split of the Defence Evaluation and Research Agency (DERA). Dstl was established to carry out and retain the science and technology work that is best done within government, while work that could be done by industry (forming the majority of DERA's activities) was transferred to Qinetiq, a government-owned company that was later floated on the stock exchange.

Dstl absorbed the Home Office's Centre for Applied Science and Technology (CAST) in April 2018, taking on CAST's role to apply science and technology to support the Home Office's operations and frontline delivery, provide evidence to support policy, and perform certain regulatory functions.

== Organisation ==
Most of Dstl's funding comes from the MOD, while a small portion comes from other government departments and commercial sources. In 2016/17, 91% of Dstl's £587 million income came from the MOD.

In April 2015, Dstl completed a major reorganisation, merging twelve operating departments into five divisions. The motivation behind this change was to enable more coherent and productive delivery to customers and simplify access routes for suppliers.

=== Leadership ===
- Martin Earwicker (2001–06): chief executive from its creation in 2001, until he left in 2006 for the Science Museum.
- Frances Saunders (2006–11): took over as acting chief executive in May 2006 and was appointed as chief executive in August 2007. On 29 June 2011, Saunders announced to staff that her post had been advertised and that she would not be applying.
- Jonathan Lyle (2012–17): formerly Director of the Programme Office at Dstl, placed into an acting role and was appointed in March 2012.
- David Marsh: acting chief executive from September 2017 to January 2018.
- Gary Aitkenhead (2018–2021).
- Doug Umbers: interim chief executive from April 2021 to February 2022.
- Paul Hollinshead (2022–)

== Operations ==
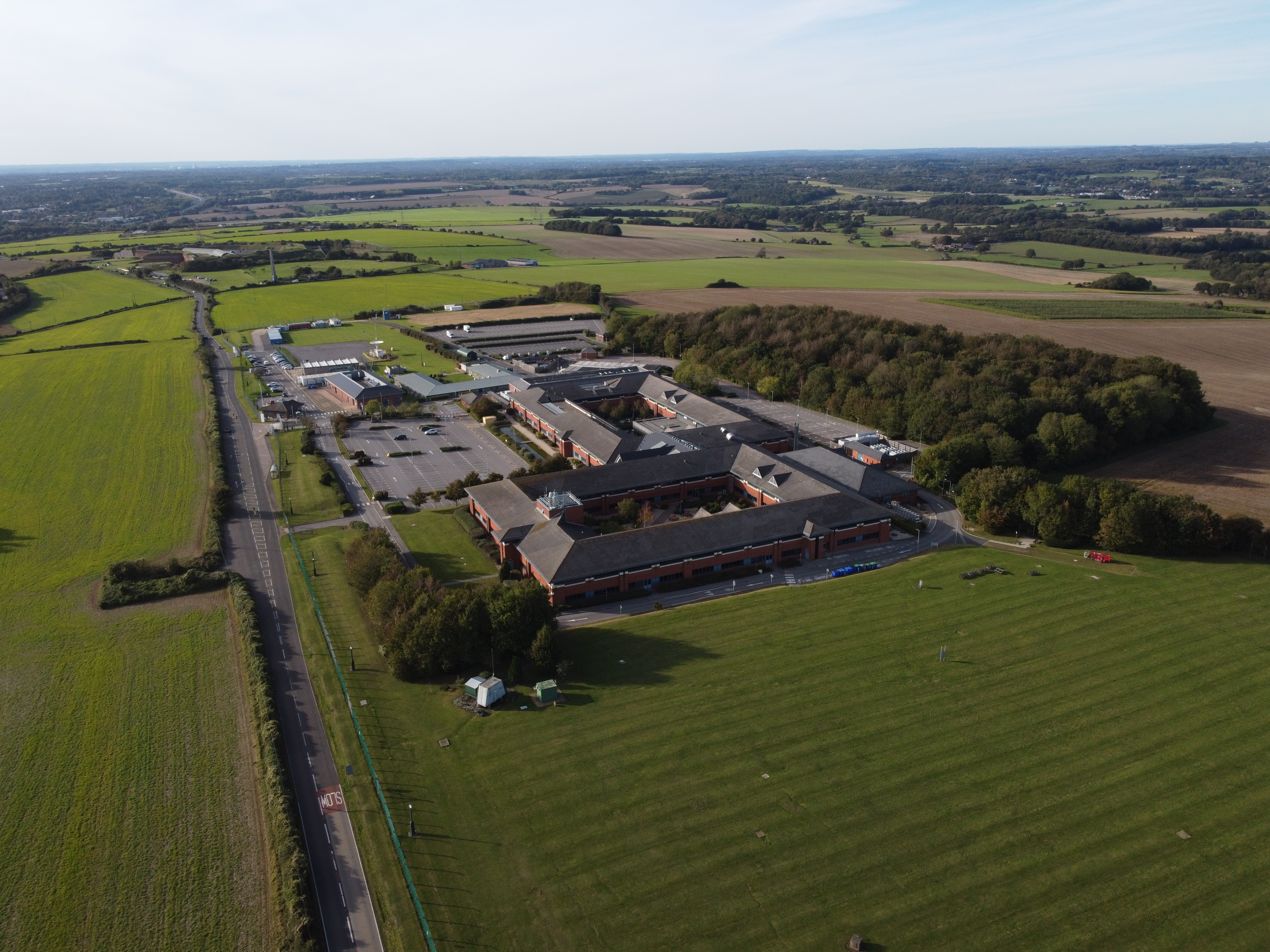
Portsdown West

Dstl carries out a broad range of work from high-level analysis to support Ministry of Defence policy and procurement decisions, to technical research in defence areas such as biomedical science and electronics, alongside operational work such as forensic analysis of explosives and providing paid volunteer scientists to Iraq and Afghanistan to provide rapid scientific advice to British forces. It has done work for around 40 government departments and agencies including the Home Office and Department for Transport. It undertakes research with both industry and academia to achieve its role.

Following a review and consultation process initiated by MOD's Chief Scientific Advisor (CSA), it became responsible for the formulation and commission of MOD's non-nuclear research programme from 1 April 2010, under the responsibility of the Dstl Programme Office. Within the Programme Office were 16 domains with some established as Science and Technology Centres, including Armour and Protection, Cyber and Influence, Counter Terrorism, and CBR (Chemical, Biological and Radiological). These centres fund research via the Centre for Defence Enterprise, also part of the Programme Office.

A subsequent MOD CSA-led review in 2015 into MOD's science and technology capability recommended that the commissioning of science and technology should be independent of the delivery.

Within the Strategic Defence and Security Review 2015 was a proposal to create "a government-backed service designed to help small and medium-sized businesses bring new ideas to market more quickly". In 2016, it was announced by Defence Secretary Michael Fallon that this 'Defence and Security Accelerator' would have access to an £800m innovation fund and build on the 'Centre for Defence Enterprise' model, operating within Dstl.

In 2017, Dstl began a five-year programme of innovation in space science. In 2019, Dstl opened a new satellite ground control station at Portsdown West to support future space research.

In March 2020, scientists from Dstl began supporting Public Health England to better understand COVID-19 during the COVID-19 pandemic in the United Kingdom. By January 2021, around 300 scientists were said to be involved with COVID-19 support.

=== R-Cloud ===
Research Cloud (or R-Cloud) is the Dstl's supply chain marketplace for science and technology research. Version 4 went live on 1 December 2020. R-Cloud frameworks cover eight "capability areas":

- Command, Control, Communication and Computers, Intelligence, Surveillance and Reconnaissance (C4ISR);
- Chemical, Biological, Radiological and Nuclear (CBRN);
- Counter Terrorism and Security (CT&S);
- Cyber;
- Human Capability (HC);
- Integrated Survivability (IS);
- Platform Systems (PS);
- Weapons.

== Locations ==
Current sites include:

- Headquarters – Porton Down, Wiltshire
- Defence Science and Technology Laboratory Portsdown West – Portsdown West, Hampshire
- Defence Science and Technology Laboratory Alverstoke –Alverstoke, Hampshire (as a tenant of the Institute of Naval Medicine, Gosport)
- Defence Science and Technology Laboratory Newcastle – National Innovation Centre for Data (NICD), Newcastle

The former CAST sites at Langhurst, West Sussex and Sandridge, Hertfordshire were closed around 2020 after the 2018 merger of CAST into Dstl.

Sections of 150 mm-thick (5.9-inch) pre-atomic steel plate uncontaminated with radionuclides, recovered from HMS Vanguard, were used for the shielding of the whole body monitor at the Radiobiological Research Laboratory (now Dstl) at Alverstoke, Gosport, Hampshire.

== Spin-offs ==
=== Ploughshare Innovations ===
In April 2005 the technology transfer company Ploughshare Innovations Ltd was formed to manage and exploit intellectual property within Dstl. Dstl and Ploughshare Innovations have successfully spun-out several new companies including Alaska Food Diagnostics and P2i Ltd.

== See also ==
- The Technical Cooperation Program (TTCP) – an international defence science and technology collaboration between Australia, Canada, New Zealand, the United Kingdom and the United States.
- DARPA – US Defence Agency responsible for the development of new technology for the US military.
- Defence Science and Technology Organisation – a branch of the Australian Department of Defence that researches and develops technologies for the Australian defence industry.
- Qinetiq – the part of Defence Evaluation and Research Agency (DERA) privatised in June 2001, with the remainder of DERA renamed Dstl.
